= NSW (disambiguation) =

NSW is the postal code for New South Wales, a state in Australia.

NSW may also refer to:

- King of Egypt
- National Herbarium of New South Wales, by Index Herbariorum code
- Naval Strike Wing of the UK's Royal Navy Fleet Air Arm
- Navut language of Vanuatu
- Newman–Shanks–Williams prime, a class of number in mathematics
- Nintendo Switch, a hybrid (home and handheld) video gaming console
- United States Naval Special Warfare Command, a military commando force
- National Socialist World, defunct neo-Nazi magazine

== See also ==
- NSFW (disambiguation) (entries with for)
- NSV (disambiguation) (by transliteration)
- NWS (disambiguation)
