= C. K. Hansen =

Danish wholesale company and freight forwarder

House flag used by C. K. Hansen

C. K. Hansen was a Danish wholesale company and non-vessel operating common carrier established in 1856 at Esplanaden 15 in Copenhagen, Denmark. The subsidiary Dampskibsselskabet Dannebrog was established in 1893. The company's former headquarters at Esplanaden 15—a Late Neoclassical building from 1856 designed by Gustav Friedrich Hetsch—was listed on the Danish registry of protected buildings and places.

== History ==
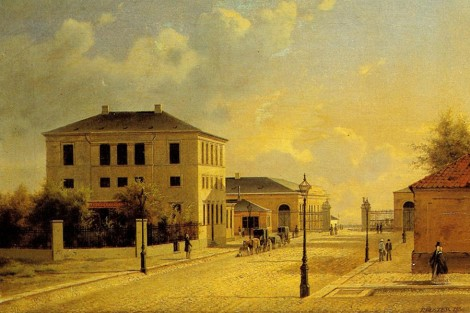
C. K. Hansen's building at Toldbodvej 15

C. K. Hansen was founded on 13 July 1856 by Christian Kjellerup Hansen (1813-1868). Hansen had previously worked for J. B. Suhr & Co. Hansen's son Johan Hansen was in 1857 made a partner in the company. Johan Hansen was after his father's death in 1868 joined by Oluf Hansen. Johan Hansen's sons, Johan and Robert Hansen, were made partners in the company following Oluf Hansen's death in 1897.

C. K. Hansen was in 1950 owned by C. J. C. Harhoff (born 1886), Knud Hansen (born 1892), Bennet C. K. Hansen (born 1914) and Preben Harhoff.

=== Subsidiaries ===
The shipping company Dampskibsselskabet Dannebrog was established as a subsidiary in 1883. It was in 1915 merged with Dampskibsselskabet af 1896 (founded 1896) and Dampskibsselskabet Neptun (founded 1901). The company's coal business was in 1912 separated from the parent company under the name A/S Københavns Bunkerkul Depot. Another subsidiary, Københavns Stevedore Comp, was in 1943 created from the company's stevedore business.

== Building ==
C. K. Hansen was based at Toldbodvej 15 (now Esplanaden 15). The building was constructed in 1856 to a Late Neoclassical design by Gustav Friedrich Hetsch. It was part of Hetsch's masterplan which was to give the entire Nordre Toldbod and Toldbodvej area a face lift. The project was never completed but Lumskebugten and the Lion's Gate were also designed by Hetsch as part of the masterplan. The building was listed on the Danish registry of protected buildings and places in 1970.

== See also ==
- Dannebrog Rederi
