= Lumskebugten =

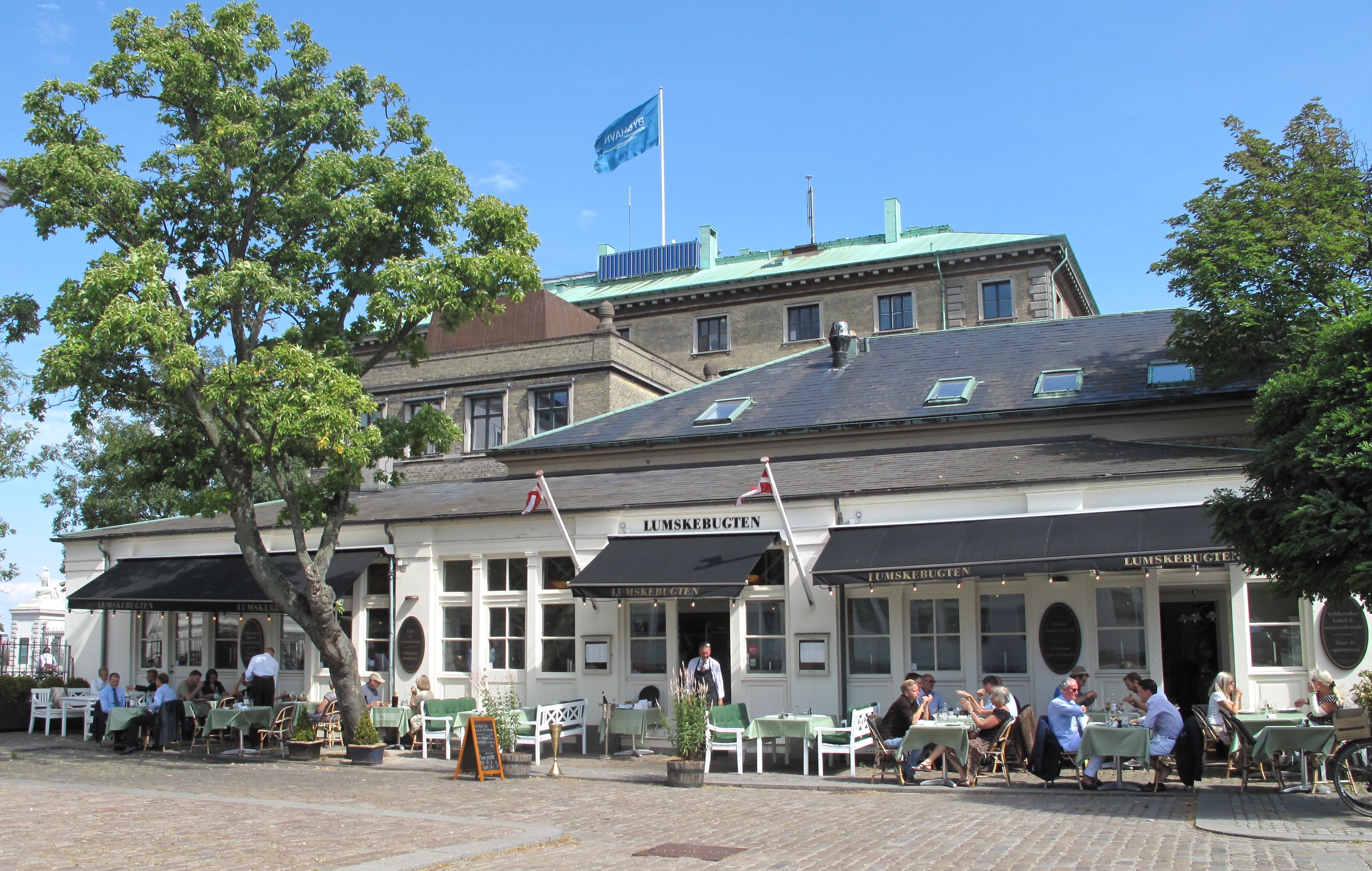
- Interactive map of Lumskebugten

Restaurant information
- Established: 1954 (72 years ago)
- Owner: Erwin Lauterbach
- Head chef: Erwin Lauterbach
- Dress code: None
- Location: Esplanaden 93; 1263 København, Copenhagen, Denmark
- Coordinates: 55°41′18″N 12°35′53″E
- Website: lumskebugten.dk

Lumskebugten is a restaurant located in a listed building at Esplanaden 21 in Copenhagen, Denmark. It has been owned by Erwin Lauterbach since 2011.

With a history that goes back to 1854, it is one of the oldest restaurants in the city. Built as part of a new entrance complex for the Northern Customs House area, it originally attracted a clientele of sailors, dockers and personnel from the naval base Nyholm. A locality on the south coast of Germania Land in northeast Greenland was named after the restaurant in 1907.

== History ==
=== Brokkens Bod ===
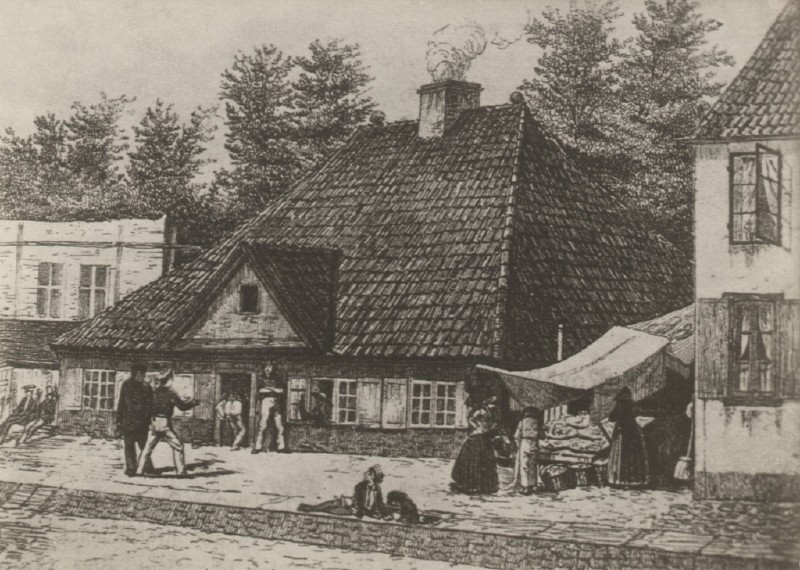
Brokkens Bod

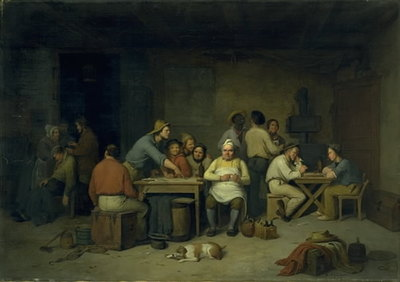
Interior from Brokkens Bod painted by Christian Andreas Schleisner in 1847

A tavern known as Brokkens Bod was from the late 17th century located at the site and would for more than a hundred years be run by the Brock family. It was one of several such establishments located at the entrance to the Customs House area. "Jens Brock's House at the Customs House" is first mentioned in tax records from 1689. The name refers to Jens Sørensen Brock who was customs officer and searcher at the customs house. On 18 March 1699, he was granted a royal license to serve beer and Danish akvavit to the public from the building. In 1708, it is referred to as "Niels Bock's widow's house" and then as "Jockum Brock's house on the road to the Customs House" in 1723. The name Brokkens Bod is first seen in records from the 1775 census. The clientele were mainly sailors and dockers from the Customs House quay and nearby Larsens Plads as well as personnel from Holmen who were ferried across the harbor on their way home to Nyboder. The building was 20 alen long and 13 alen deep and the door was so low that people had to bend over to enter Brokkens Bod competed with nearby Paradiset (Paradise), another tavern, when it came to serving the largest akvavits in town. To "have taken the height off Brokkens Bod" was once locally used as a euphemism for being heavily inebriated. Opposite Brokkens Bod was Toldbods Vinstue (The ToldbodWine House), a place frequented mainly by skippers and mates with a reputation for offering good and cheap food and accommodation.

=== Current buildings ===
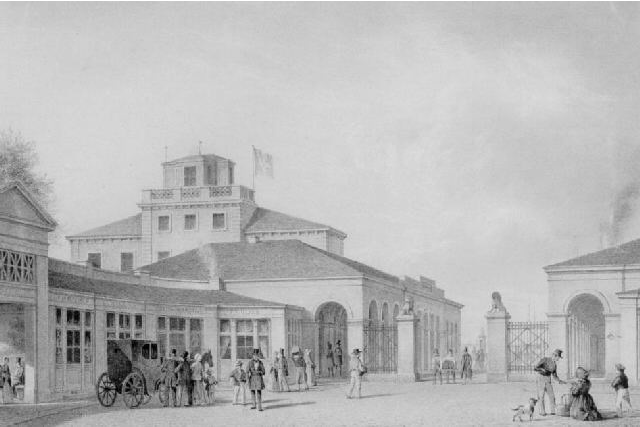
Lumskebugten seen on a drawing by Andreas Juuel from the 1850s

Brokkens Bod was demolished in the 1850s to make way for a new complex of buildings constructed in associated with the customs area. Like its predecessor, it was a tavern for sailors and dockers, located at one of the busiest places on Copenhagen's harbourfront.

The origins of the name is unclear. It has traditionally been explained as an intentionally ambiguous reference to a term used on nautical maps meaning "a bay with treacherous sand, moving sand bars", prone to make ships ground, an effect that the tavern was also known to have on many of its customers. The validity of this explanation has, however, been questioned and it may in fact be the other way round. It has thus been impossible to find the term used on old maps while a locality on the southern shores of Germania Land in North-East Greenland was named after the restaurant in 1907. The name was proposed by Christian Bendix Thostrup, a member of the Denmark Expedition.

The area gradually changed character after the old Toldbodvej (Customs House Road) was refurbished and its name changed to Esplanaden (The Esplanade). Lumskebugten then developed into a popular lunch restaurant.

The prominent Danish chef Erwin Lauterbach acquired the restaurant in 2011. It reopened after a renovation in August 2012.

== Buildings ==
Lumskebugten is located on the east side of a small courtyard off the north side of Esplanaden. The building on the opposite side of the courtyard was also a tavern. The two buildings were both designed by Gustav Friedrich Hetsch. He also designed the new entrance to the customs area, Lion's Gate (Løveport"), named for the two lions seated on the gate pillars. Just inside the gate are two guard houses with arcades flanking the street. The Lumskebugten building is attached to one of them.

The larger building at the north side of the courtyard was built for the Royal Nautical Charts Archives and was also the first home of the Danish Meteorological Institute. It was built to design by Wilhelm Petersem in 1878 and is thus a little younger than the other buildings. The building now serves as head office for Mærsk Oil, a subsidiary of Mærsk which has its global headquarters on the other side of the street.

== Today ==
The restaurant serves traditional Danish cuisine with influence from seasonal, modern French cuisine. The menu includes smørrebrød. The restaurant is known for attracting businesspeople from Mærsk's nearby headquarters and other offices in the area for lunch.
