= NWS =

NWS may refer to:

== Organisations and businesses ==
- National Weather Service, a U.S. government agency charged with issuing weather forecasts, advisories, watches, and warnings on a daily basis
- National Woolsorters' Society, a former British trade union
- Netherlands Worldwide Students, a worldwide network of Dutch students enrolled in foreign universities
- Nintendo World Store, Nintendo's showcase store in New York City
- NWS Holdings, a listed company in Hong Kong

== Other uses ==
- Cochliomyia hominivorax or New World screwworm, a parasitic blowfly with flesh-eating maggots
- North Warning System, a series of radar stations across Arctic North America
- North West Shelf Project, an Australian resource development project for extracting and processing natural gas
- North Wilkesboro Speedway, a car racing track
- Northwest Semitic languages, a branch of the Afro-Asiatic language family
- Nuclear Weapons State, a term relating to the U.S., Russia, China, United Kingdom and France in the Nuclear Non-Proliferation Treaty
- NWS, News Corp's Nasdaq ticker symbol for Class B stock
  - News Corporation, News Corp's predecessor under the same ticker symbol
- NWS (TV station), a television station in Adelaide, South Australia, owned by the Nine Network

== See also ==
- North West Shelf (disambiguation)
