= Esplanaden, Copenhagen =

Street in Copenhagen

Esplanaden
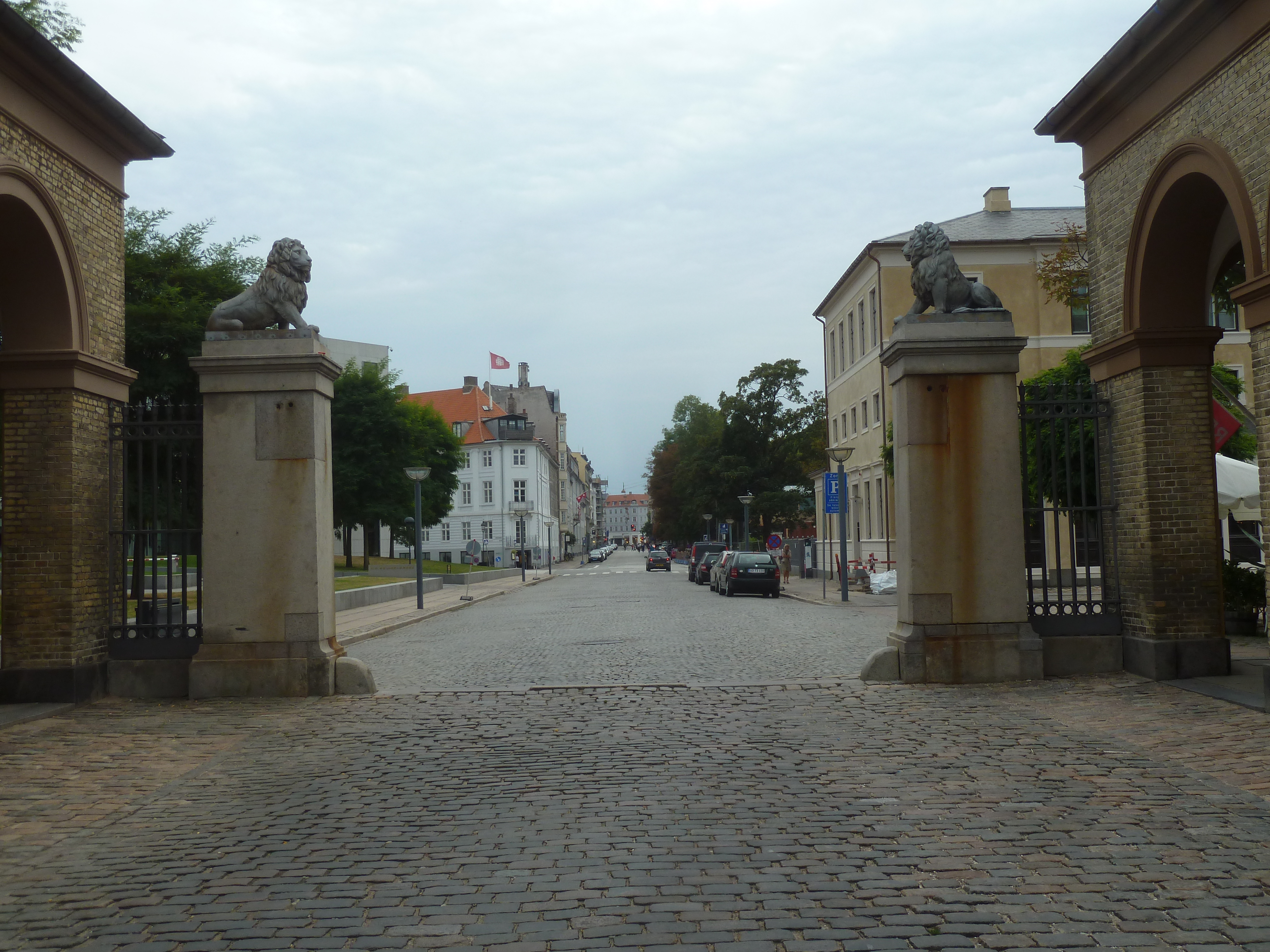
- Esplanaden seen from Nordre Toldbod
- Interactive map of Esplanaden
- Former name: Toldbodvej
- Length: 390 m (1,280 ft)
- Location: Indre By, Copenhagen, Denmark
- Postal code: 1263
- Coordinates: 55°41′16″N 12°35′41″E

Esplanaden (Danish pronunciation: [espʰlæˈnɛːðn̩, e̝s-]; "The Esplanade") is a street in Copenhagen, Denmark. It extends eastwards from Store Kongensgade and runs along the south side of the city's 17th-century fortress Kastellet and Churchillparken until it reaches the waterfront at Nordre Toldbod, just south of Langelinie, passing Amaliegade, Bredgade and Grønningen on the way. It marks the northern border of the Frederiksstaden district.

It is best known as the address of the headquarters of A.P. Moller-Maersk, the largest shipping company in the world. In Danish media and daily usage, the street name is often used as a metonym for company's top management.

== History ==
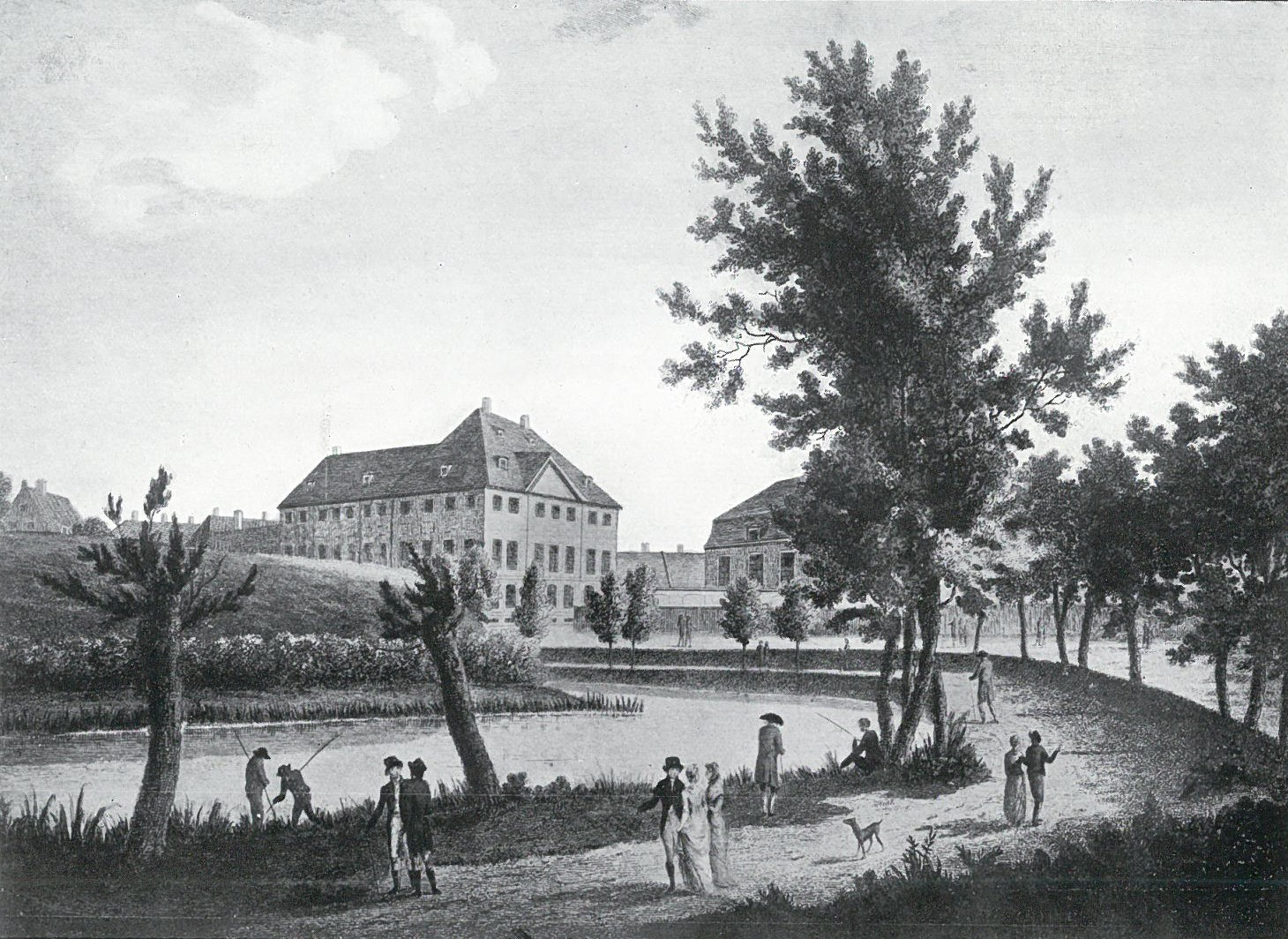
Esplanaden in 1790

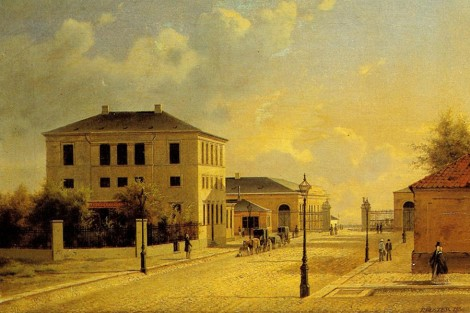
Toldbodvej in 1872

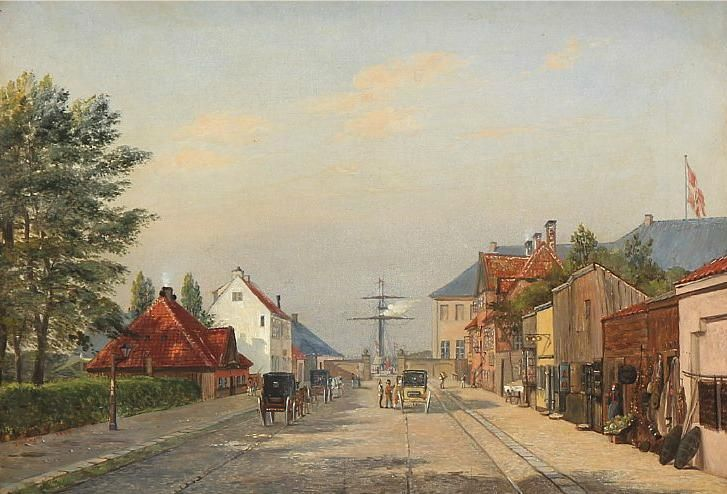
C O Zeuthen: Toldbodvej

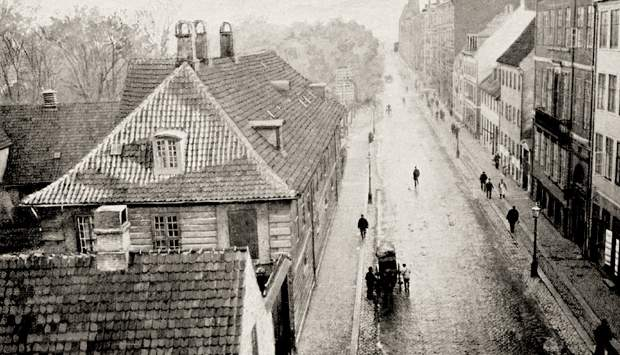
Toldbodvej seen from Store Kongensgade in 1894: The Old Guard Hussars Barracks is the building to the left and the New Guard Hussars is the second building on the right.

The street is located on Kastellet's former esplanade. Then known as Toldbodvej, literally "Custom House Road", was created as an access road to the Custom House, complementing Toldbodgade ("Custom House Street"), which came from the south along the water.

In the 1780s, a tree-lined avenue, which quickly became a popular venue for promenades, was established between the end of Bredgade and the harbourfront a little to the north of Toldbodvej. A total of 3,000 trees from Jægersborg Dyrehave were planted in the grounds. It was around the same time that the first town houses began to appear on the south side of Toldbodvej. The tree-lined promenade largely disappeared with the construction of the Port Authority Building (1868), the Royal Nautical Charts Archive (1873), and later the Resistance Museum.

On 21 October 1885, council president Jacob Brønnum Scavenius Estrup was the target of an attempted assassination outside No. 34. The unsuccessful assassin was Julius Rasmussen.

In the 19th century, the Guard Hussars barracks were located at the western end of the street, first on its north side and later also in a building on its south side. It was demolished about 1900 and the site was built over in connection with the establishment of Grønningen. The masterplan for the area was adopted on 29 June 1903. The smaller streets in the area have names associated with the island of Bornholm.

Toldbodvej was renamed Esplanaden in 1953.

== Notable buildings and residents ==
Several of the buildings on the streets were designed by Andreas Hallander, including the two buildings on the corner of Amaliegade, No. 46 (1791) and No. 48 (1789), which are both listed. No. 6 is from 1785 and was designed by Andreas Kirkerup.

No. 15 was completed in 1850 to a Neoclassical design by Gustav Friedrich Hetsch. It now houses the A.P. Møller and wife Chastine Mc-Kinney Møller Foundation. Bertelsen & Scheving completed a major renovation of the building in 2013. No. 19 originally housed the Royal Nautical Charts Archive as well as the Meteorological Institute. The building was designed by Vilhelm Petersen and built in 1872–1873. The restaurant Lumskebugten has existed since 1854 and is located in a listed building. Babette Hotel (No. 22 ) is a boutique hotel operated by Guldsmeden Hotels.

== See also ==
- C. K. Hansen
