= SFW =

SFW may refer to:

- S.F.W., a 1994 film directed by Jefery Levy
- Safe for work, Internet slang for material appropriate for workplaces or schools
- Safi Airways, an airline based in Afghanistan, ICAO designator SFW
- Science Fiction World (科幻世界), a monthly science fiction magazine in China
- Screen-Free Week, annual event where people shall turn off screens (formerly TV Turnoff Week and Digital Detox Week)
- Sensor Fuzed Weapon, a type of cluster bomb system
- Shoppers Food Warehouse, a supermarket chain based in the Washington, D.C., region

== See also ==
- NSFW (disambiguation)
