= Danish Students Abroad =

Danish Students Abroad (DSA) is a non-profit and membership based interest organization. DSA works to advise and represent its Danish students before, during and after their educational stay abroad.

== Organization ==
DSA was founded in 2012 and counts members of all ages and at all stages of education. The daily operation is led by a board of Danish students who is currently studying or has already studied abroad. Their work revolves around four pillars: advisory, political representation, community building and career bridging.

DSA's funding stems from membership fees and grants. DSA has received grants from a number of Danish foundations, amongst others “Hedorfs Fond”.

== Activities and events ==
DSA hosts a wide range of events in Denmark and abroad. In 2013, DSA hosted its first career conference in an attempt to strengthen the ties between Danish students who have studied abroad and the Danish private sector. In 2013, the event was opened by then minister from the Social Liberal Party, Morten Østergaard. In addition, DSA hosts “Open House” events in England for Danish students wishing to attend a British university. The events are made up of guided tours of university campuses at prominent institutions in London as well as visits to Cambridge or Oxford.

== Political engagements ==
DSA regularly attends meeting with government agencies and political spokespeople for education and research .

The organization drew attention in 2013 when it proclaimed itself in favour of an EU court ruling that meant that Danish students are entitled to “student grants” (SU), even if they have not lived in Denmark for the past 10 years. Furthermore, DSA has advocated for balancing the conversion of the International Baccalaureate to the Danish 12-point grading scale. As of the last improvement to the scale, made over the summer of 2017, demands for further balancing has been put on hold.

Following the Brexit referendum in June 2016, DSA worked to ensure that the political decision would not affect Danish students chances of going abroad to British universities. Since then, DSA has collaborated with the non-profit student consultancy 180 Degrees Consulting at King's College London and has initiated a collaboration with Netherlands Worldwide Students, Association of Norwegian Students Abroad and Sweden International Students and Alumni to collaborate on the potential consequences of Brexit.

In 2017, DSA achieved a political victory as cuts to the foreign stipend for Danish master's degree students were withheld.

Finally, DSA remains critical of “retskravet”, a mechanism that ensures Danish bachelor's degree students guaranteed access to the same master's degree within a year, but at the expense of students with a foreign degree and high merits.
