= Esplanaden 6 =

Historic building in Copenhagen, Denmark

Esplanaden
- Tre Hjorter
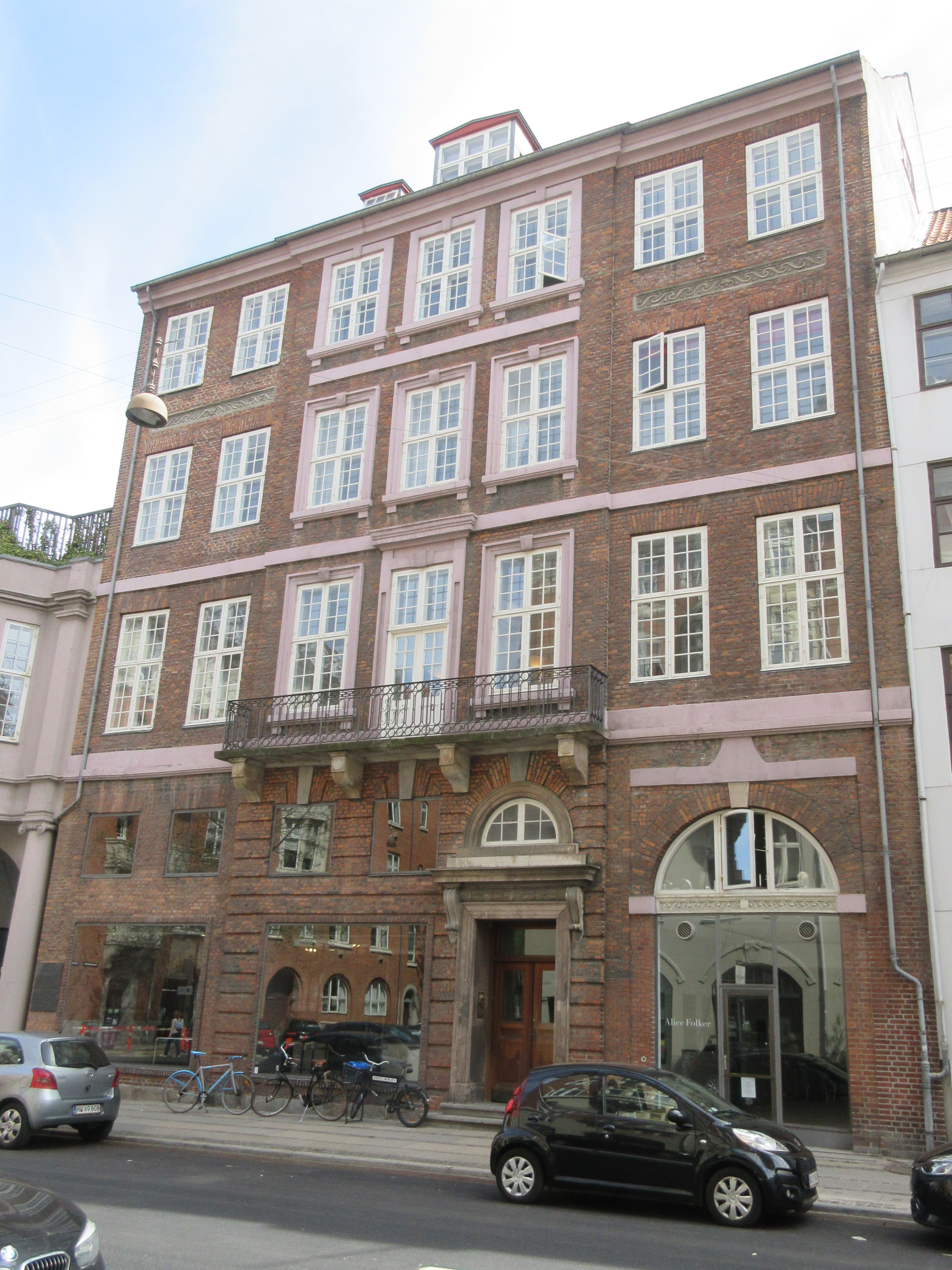
- Interactive map of the Esplanaden area

General information
- Location: Copenhagen, Denmark
- Coordinates: 55°41′14.21″N 12°35′27.38″E
- Completed: 1787

Esplanaden 6 is a late 18th-century, Neoclassical property on Esplanaden, located close to Kastellet in central Copenhagen, Denmark. It was listed on the Danish registry of protected buildings and places in 1918.

== History ==
Esplanaden No. 4 and No. 6 originally formed a single lot. The house, which had a large garden, was one of the first houses on Toldbodvej (later Rsplanaden). From 1750 to 1779, it was owned by Oluf Bang (1710–1783), the bell-ringer at the Church of Holmen. The house, a two-storey, timber-framed building, sight bays wide and with a central gateway, was a little pulled back from the road. To the rear of it was another building, also is two storeys and with timber framing. The courtyard featured a small wooden shed and a water pump. The large garden featured to open pavilions and an espalier.

Oluf Bang moved to the corner of Reverensgade and Vingårdsstræde and his house at Toldbodvej was ub i 1779 acquired by sea captain and destiller Christian Rasmussen Lihme (1731–1784) and goldsmith and brewer Jens Sander Schouw (1724–1798), Schouw, who lived in Laksegade from 1763 to 1796, was from 1778 to 1794 also the owner of another house at Toldbodvej. Lihme drowned at New Guinea in 1784.

Johannes Caspersen, who had recently married Anna Dorothea Weilbach (1763-1841), purchased the property at Toldbodvej in 1783. Johannes Caspersen's father, Hans Caspersem, who was anchor smith at Asiatisk Plads, had constructed several houses in Christianshavn. Johannes Caspersen lived with his family in the house at Toldbodvej for a few years but then moved to one of his father's houses at Overgaden neden Vandet 33 and sold the property at Toldbodvej to his father in 1785.

Hans Caspersen demolished the house at Toldbodvej and divided the property into two lots. The house at No. 4 had been completed by June 1787. Caspersen sold it to destiller Jens Jørgen Fæster (1747-1825) in 1789 but reacquired it in 1792 only to sell it to master tailor Johannes Simonsen Schiøtz (1755-1823) and his brother, miller in Korsør, Niels Simonsen Schiøtz (1760-1820).

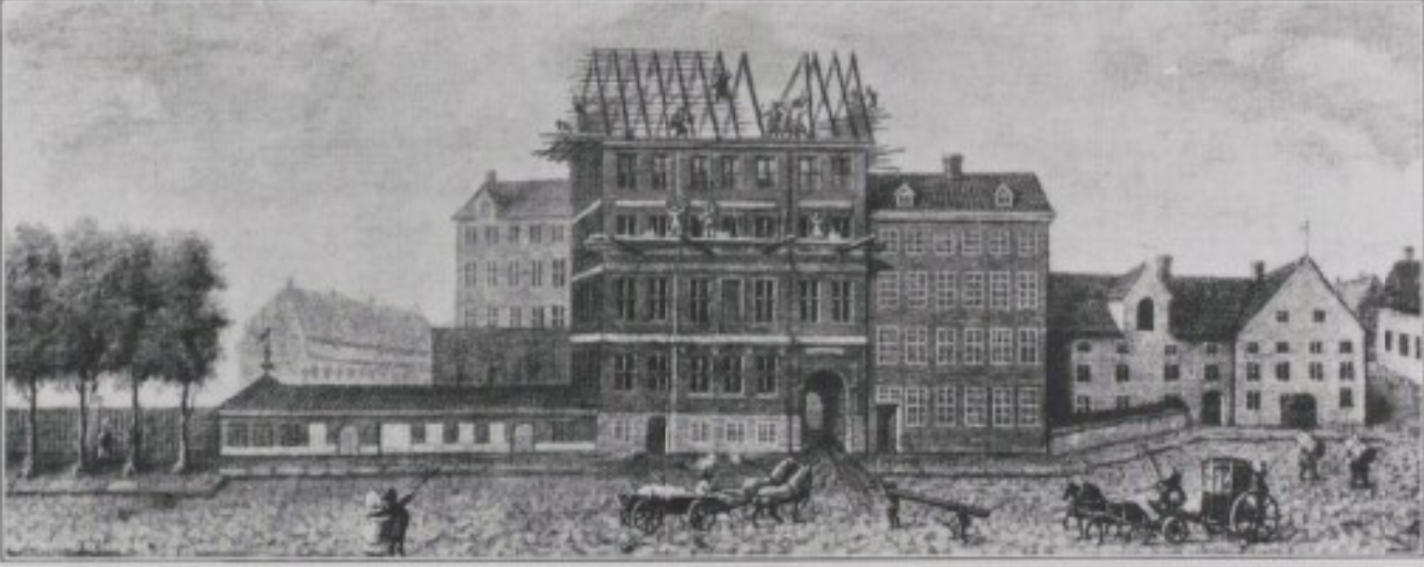
Esplanaden 6 under construction

The building at No. 6 was also completed in 1787. In the courtyard was an 11-bay wooden shed with tile roof, a washhouse and a smithy.

Johannes Caspersen and his family were most likely originally meant to move back to the building on its completion but this never happened. Hans Caspersen purchased an old house in Kongensgade (now Wildersgade 38) in 1791, demolished it and constructed a new one for the son. Johannes Caspersen bought it from his father in 1796 and lived there until 1811.

The property on Toldbodvej was on 30 June 1791 sold to commander captain Peter Ramshart (1741-1813). A total of nine families lived in the building at the 1801 census. The owner, now with rank of counter admiral, lived there with his second wife Fredericia Christine Schmidt (1752-1810), their four children, the wife's younger sister, servants and a service-runner.

A new owner, Christian Michael Rottbøll (1805-1894), an assessor (law), lived in the building with his wife Gunhild Marie (1815-1902) and five children at the time of the 1834 census. The 36-year-odl art historian Niels Lauritz Høyen, was a resident in the rear wing.

The property changed hands several times over the next decade. In 1844, it was taken over by the Guard Hussar Barracks on the other side of the street. The barracks closed in 1896. The buildings were demolished when Grønningen was created.

== Architecture ==
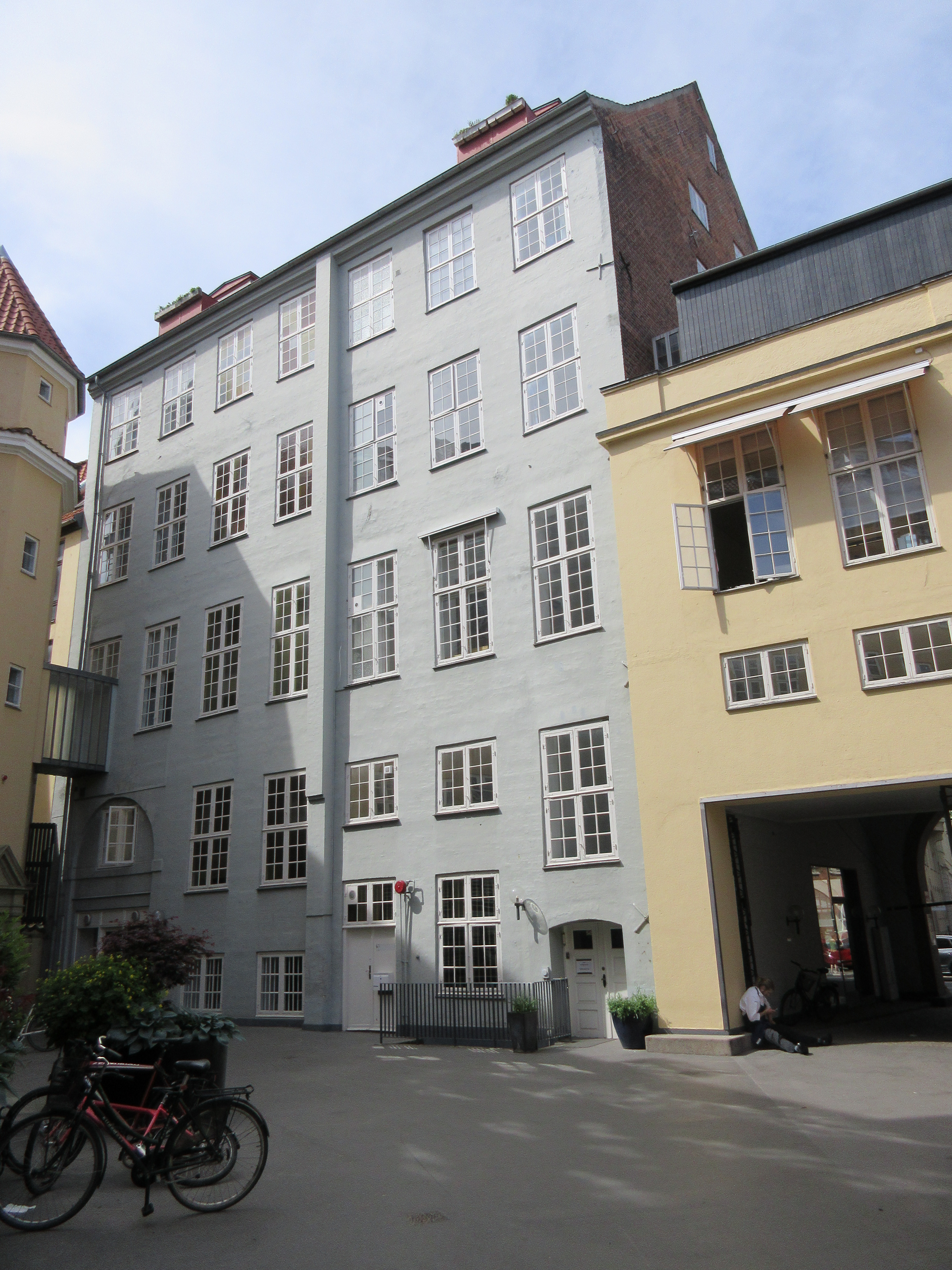
The rear side of the building

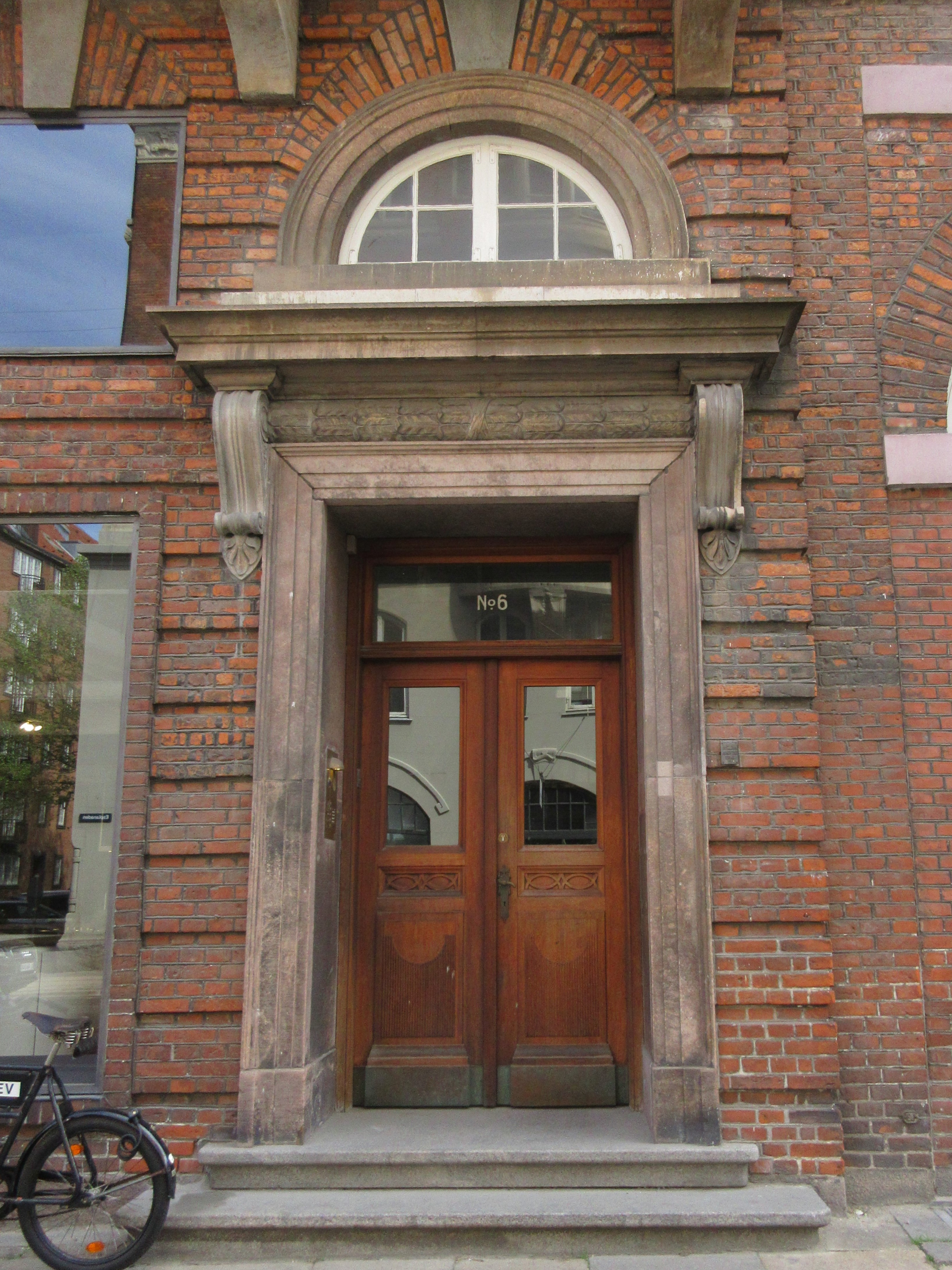
The main entrance

The buildings was probably designed by Andreas Kirkerup. It is constructed in red brick with plinth, cornices and window frames in Bornholmian granite. The building is seven bays wide and has a median risalit. The first floor features three-bay balcony supported by corbels. One of the corbels features a relief of an anchor. The reliefs on the three other corbels are slurred. The lowest floor and high cellar was merged into a new ground floor with mezzanine.
