= North West Shelf (disambiguation) =

The North West Shelf is a continental shelf region of Western Australia.

North West Shelf or Northwest Shelf can also refer to:

- North West Shelf Operational Oceanographic System, a system that monitors variables in the European North West Shelf in the North Sea area
- North West Shelf Project, a resource development project, extracting natural gas from under the ocean from the North West Shelf in Western Australia
- Northwest Shelf Province, a biogeographic region of Australia's continental shelf
- Northwest Shelf Transition, a biogeographic region of Australia's continental shelf
