= Danish Maritime Safety Administration =

- Farvandsvæsenet
- Danish Maritime Safety Administration logo

Organisation overview
- Formed: March 28, 1973
- Preceding agencies: Danish Lighthouse Service; Danish Pilotage Service; Danish Rescue Service; Royal Danish Nautical Charts Archive
- Dissolved: October 3, 2011
- Jurisdiction: Kingdom of Denmark
- Headquarters: Christianshavn, Copenhagen, Denmark
- Employees: 850
- Annual budget: 255,8 Million DKK (2007)
- Organisation executive: Svend Eskildsen, Director
- Parent Organisation: Ministry of Defence

The Danish Maritime Safety Administration (DaMSA) (Danish: Farvandsvæsenet) was a department of the Danish Ministry of Defence with administration located in Christianshavn, Copenhagen. DaMSA operated throughout Denmark as part of the Danish Search and Rescue (SAR) organization that runs 21 rescue stations located along the coasts of Denmark.

Responsibilities of DaMSA included authorizing navigation systems and buoyage, resolving issues concerning wrecks and their salvage in Danish waters, and running the Danish Pilotage Service (Lodsvæsenet). DaMSA was the Centre for Operational Oceanography, which collects hydrographical and oceanographic data from all national waters, and makes charts and maps for use by the Military of Denmark and civilians. DaMSA was a full member of the North West Shelf Operational Oceanographic System.

== History ==
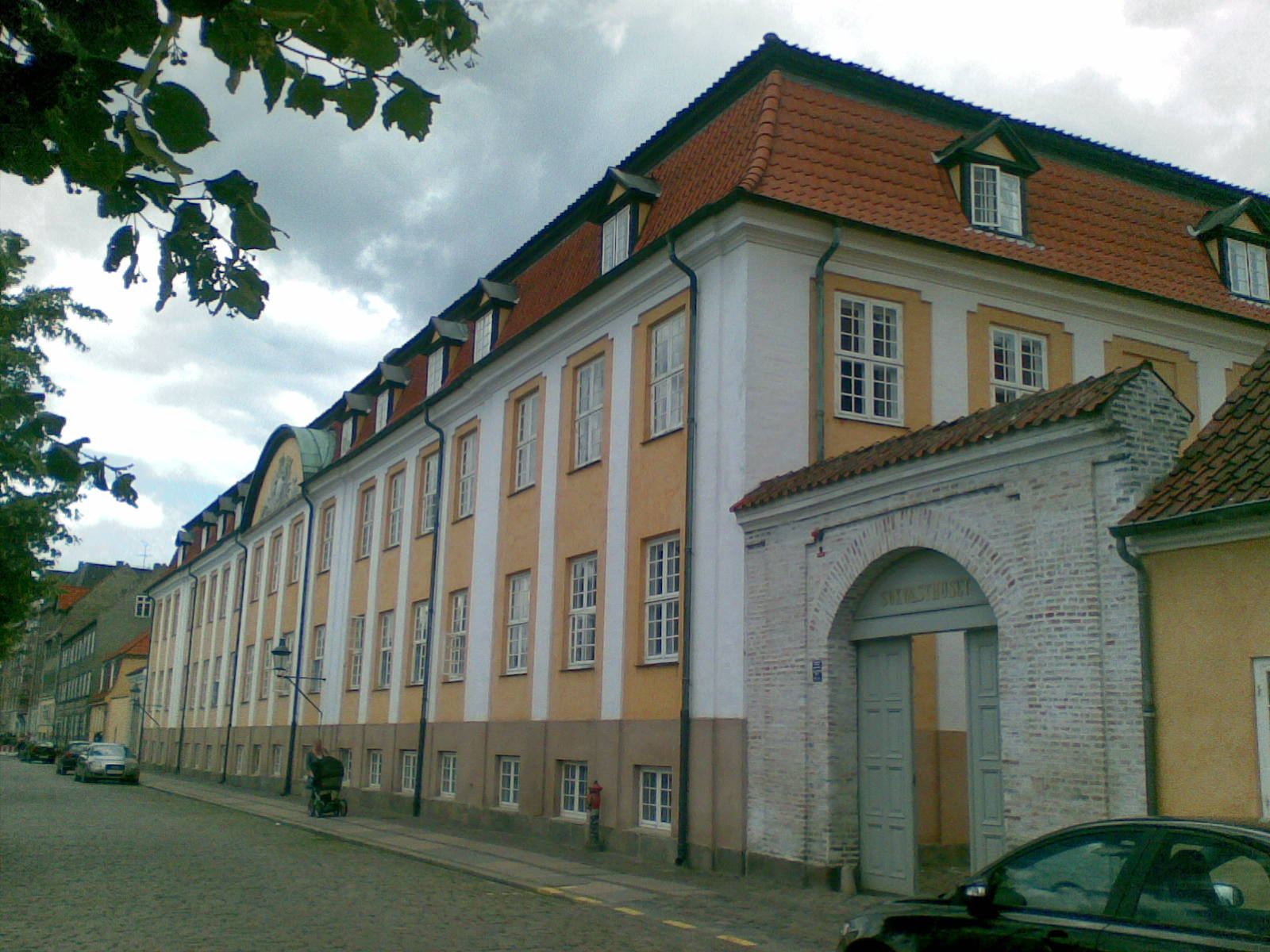
Farvandsvæsenet is headquartered in Søkvæsthuset.

On 1 April 1973 Farvandsdirektoratet was established by merging the following organizations: Danish Lighthouse Service (Fyrvæsenet), Danish Pilotage Service (Lodsvæsenet), Danish Rescue Service (Redningsvæsenet) and the Royal Danish Nautical charts archive (Det Kongelige danske Søkortarkiv).

During the late 1970s and 1980s, the name Farvandsdirektoratet was changed to Farvandsvæsenet. Farvandsdirektoratet remained a used and accepted name.

In 1987 the Royal Danish Nautical charts archive was detached for merger with the National Survey and Cadastre of Denmark. All of these services have a long history on their own, reaching back to 1560.

On 1 April 2008 Farvandsvæsenet changed its English name from Royal Danish Administration of Navigation and Hydrography (RDANH) to Danish Maritime Safety Administration (DaMSA).

== Buildings ==
Farvandsvaesenet occupied the buildings named Søkvæsthuset and Bakkehuset. Bakkehuset is known for housing the Danish poet Johan Ludvig Heiberg.

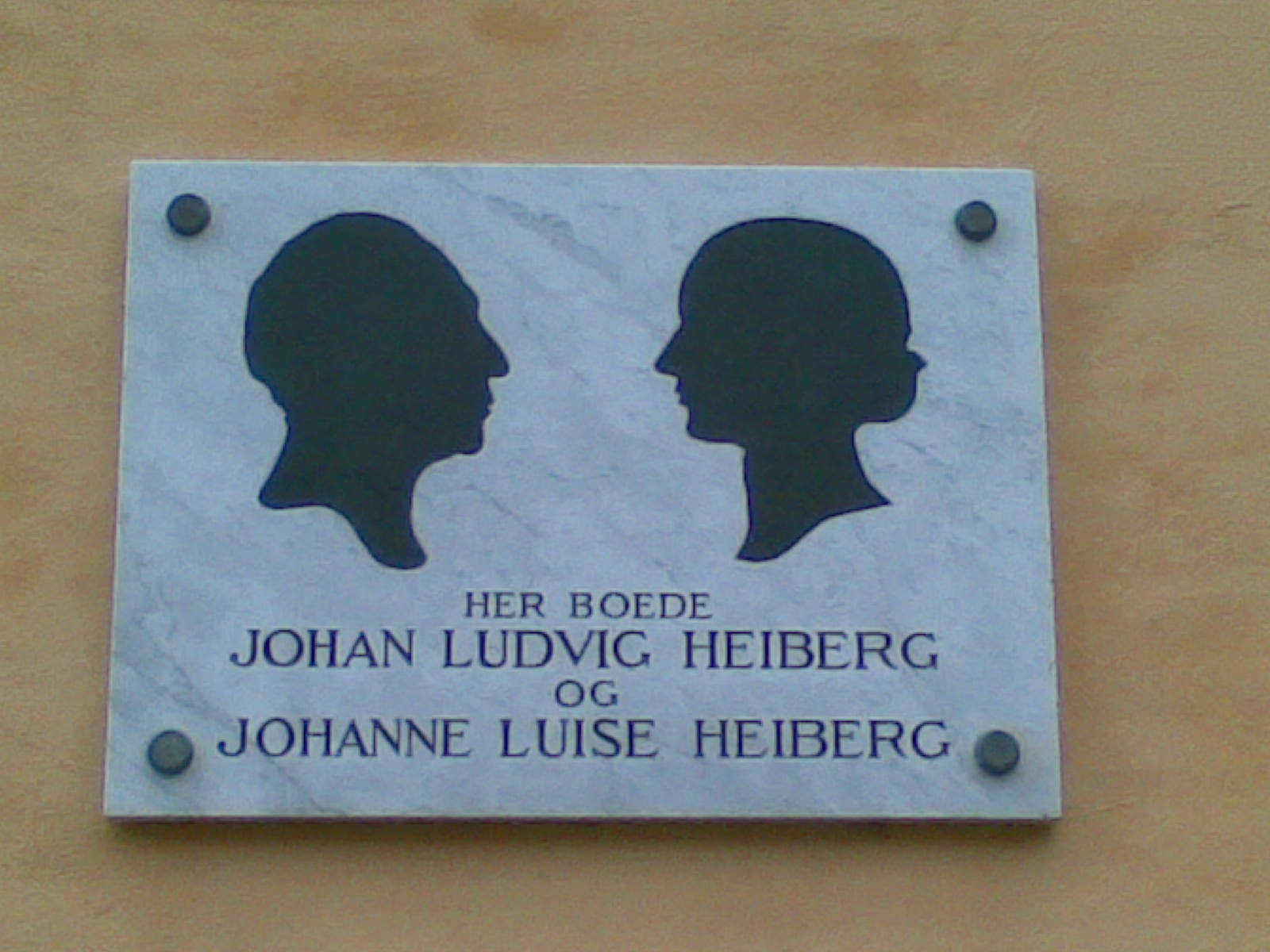
Plaque on Bakkehuset

== Mission and tasks ==
The mission of the Danish Maritime Safety Administration was to assure the safety of navigation at sea in Danish, Faroese and Greenlandic waters. DaMSA achieved this mission through execution of the following tasks: Exercise jurisdiction and issue nautical publications; Provide aids to navigation; Provide coastal rescue; Provide pilotage; Conduct hydrographical surveys and provide oceanographic information.

DaMSA was a member of the SeaDataNet European Directory of Marine Organizations, providing bathymetric measurements in Danish and Greenlandic waters. Five surveying ships are present working in Danish waters, all equipped with a shallow water multibeam system. Two surveying ships (one with multibeam) are stationed in Greenland with working area on the west coast.

== Abolition ==
The Maritime Safety Administration was abolished by royal decree of 3 October 2011. Its tasks were redistributed: pilotage service and maritime buoyage were transferred to the Ministry of Economic and Business Affairs, oceanography was transferred to the Ministry of Climate and Energy and hydrographic surveying was transferred to the Ministry of Environment.
