= Guldsmeden Hotels =

Hotel chain based in Denmark

GuldsmedenHotels
- Company type: Private
- Industry: Hotel
- Founded: 1999
- Headquarters: Copenhagen, Denmark
- Number of locations: 11 hotels
- Key people: Sandra and Marc Plesner Weinert (CEOs)

Guldsmeden Hotels is a family-owned, Green Globe-certified chain of upscale boutique hotels based out of Copenhagen, Denmark. It consists of six hotels in Denmark (five in Copenhagen and one in Aarhus) and one hotel in Oslo (Norway), Reykjavík (Iceland), Berlin (Germany), Menton (France) and Bali (Indonesia).

The chain is owned by Sandra and Marc Plesner Weinert and takes its name after the street Guldsmedegade in Aarhus where they opened their first hotel in 1999.

== Sustainability ==
All hotels in the Guldsmeden Hotels chain have been awarded both the Green Globe, the Green Key award, and Golden Ø eco labels. All of their hotels are showcased on the EcoHotels.com website.

== Hotels in Denmark ==
=== Hotel 66 Guldsmeden ===
Hotel 66 Guldsmeden /formerly Hotel Carlton) has 74 rooms and is located at Vesterbrogade 66 in Vesterbro, Copenhagen. It was Guldsmeden Hotels' first hotel in Copenhagen when it opened in 2002 and has been through several renovations and expansions since then.

=== Hotel Axel Guldsmeden ===
Hotel Axel has 202 rooms (including four penthouse suites with their own private rooftop terrace) and is located at Colbjørnsensgade 14 in Vesterbro, Copenhagen. The hotel was located in Helgolandsgade on the other side of the block when it opened in 2007 but it was expanded with the former Hotel du Nord in Colbjørnsensgade in 2017. Facilities include a spa area and a courtyard garden.

=== Hotel Babette Guldsmeden ===
Hotel Babette Guldsmeden has 98 rooms and is located at the corner of Bredgade (No. 78) and Esplanaden in the Frederiksstaden district of central Copenhagen. Facilities include restaurant & bar Bar’bette and an orangery which connects the two parts of the hotel.

The hotel was formerly operated by Girst Hotels as Hotel Esplanaden. It was taken over by Guldsmeden Hotels in 2014 and reopened after a major renovation on 20 February 2015. The building is from 1883 and was designed by Emil Blichfeldt.

=== Hotel Manon les Suites ===
Hotel Manon les Suites has 87 rooms and suites and is located at Gyldenløvesgade 10 in central Copenhagen. The hotel was formerly operated by Girst Hotels but taken over by Guldsmeden Hotels on 1 October 2016 and reopened after a major renovation in April 2017. Facilities include an indoor swimming pool.

=== Hotel Bryggen Guldsmeden ===
Bryggen Guldsmeden opened in 2020 and has 211 rooms and suites located at Gullfossgade 4 in Islands Brygge. Facilities include and outdoor heated swimming pool, sauna, and steam shower. The hotel is also the first in Denmark to offer Orbital Shower Systems in all the rooms, as part of the CSR policies.

== Hotels outside Denmark ==
=== Hotel Oslo Guldsmeden ===
Hotel Guldsmeden oslo is located at Parkveien 78 in Oslo, Norway. It joined Guldsmeden Hotels in 2010.

=== Hotel Eyja Guldsmeden (Reykjavík) ===
Hotel Eyja Guldsmeden in Reykiavik opened in 2015 and has 65 rooms.

=== Lulu Guldsmeden Hotel (Berlin) ===
Lulu Guldsmeden Hotel, opened in September 2016, is located on Potsdamer Strasse in Berlin, Germany. It has 81 rooms, six suites, and facilities include a meeting room for 12 people.

=== Chapung Se Bali Resort & Spa (Ubud, Bali Indonesia) ===
Chapung Se Bali Resort & Spa opened in 2010. It has 14 Suites and 8 Villas.

=== John & Will Silohotel by Guldsmeden ===
In 2024 Guldsmeden Hotels opened its second hotel in Germany in the northern port city of Bremen, approximately 125 kilometers southwest of Hamburg. The hotel in Bremen has 116 rooms and a suite. It is located in the silo buildings by the harbour and close to the center, which used to house the breakfast company Kellogg's factory. The hotel is named "John & Will" after the brothers John and Will Kellogg, who were behind, among other things, Kellogg's cornflakes.

== Awards ==
Guldsmeden Hotels won the award for Best Hotel Chain at the Danish Travel Awards in 2017 and was runner-up in 2016.
