= Churchillparken =

Park in Copenhagen Municipality, Denmark

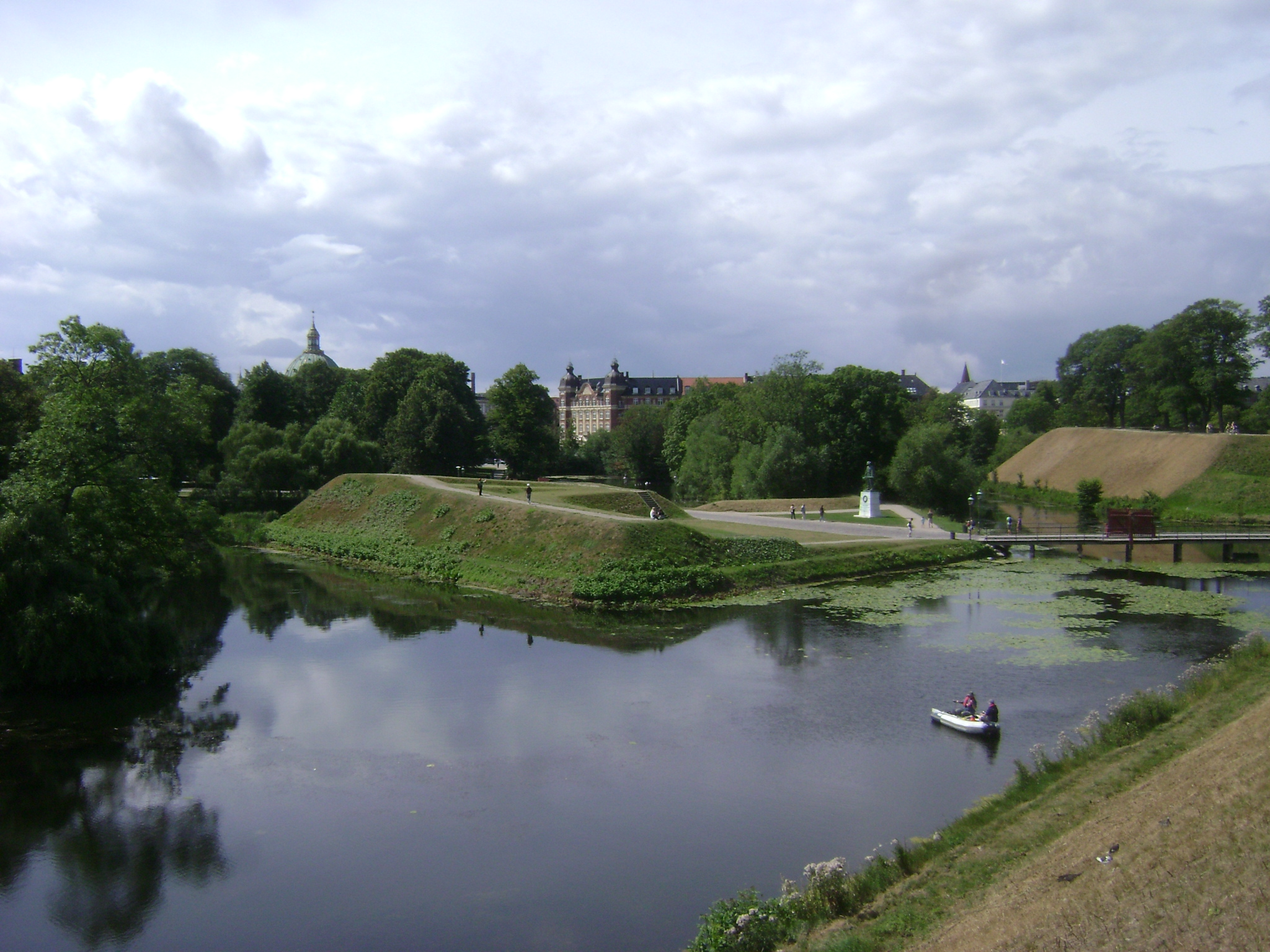
- Churchill Park seen from Kastellet
- Interactive map of Churchillparken
- Type: Public
- Location: Copenhagen, Denmark
- Coordinates: 55°41′18″N 12°35′45″E
- Area: 2 hectares (4.9 acres)
- Created: 1965

Churchillparken (English: Churchill Park) is a public park in Copenhagen, Denmark, occupying a tract of land between Kastellet, a 17th-century fortress, and the street Esplanaden. Located on the former esplanade which used to surround Kastellet, the area has a long history as a greenspace but received its current name in 1965 to commemorate Winston Churchill and the British assistance in the liberation of Denmark during World War II.

St. Alban's Church, the Anglican church in Copenhagen, and the Museum of Danish Resistance are located within the boundaries of the park. Access to Kastellet through its main entrance, The King's Gate, is also reached through the park.

== History ==
The grounds were originally part of the esplanade which surrounded Kastellet. In 1761 it became part of a tree-lined promenade, known simply as Esplanaden (English: The Esplanade), which was established between the Northern Custom House and the Eastern City Gate along the southern and western margin of Kastellet.

In the 1880s, after Kastellet had lost its strategic role in the defence of the city, St. Alban's English Church was built in the grounds. After World War II the site was also chosen as the home of the Museum of Danish Resistance which was completed in 1957. Over the next few years, several war memorials were erected in the area which finally, in 1965, received its current name.

== Monuments ==
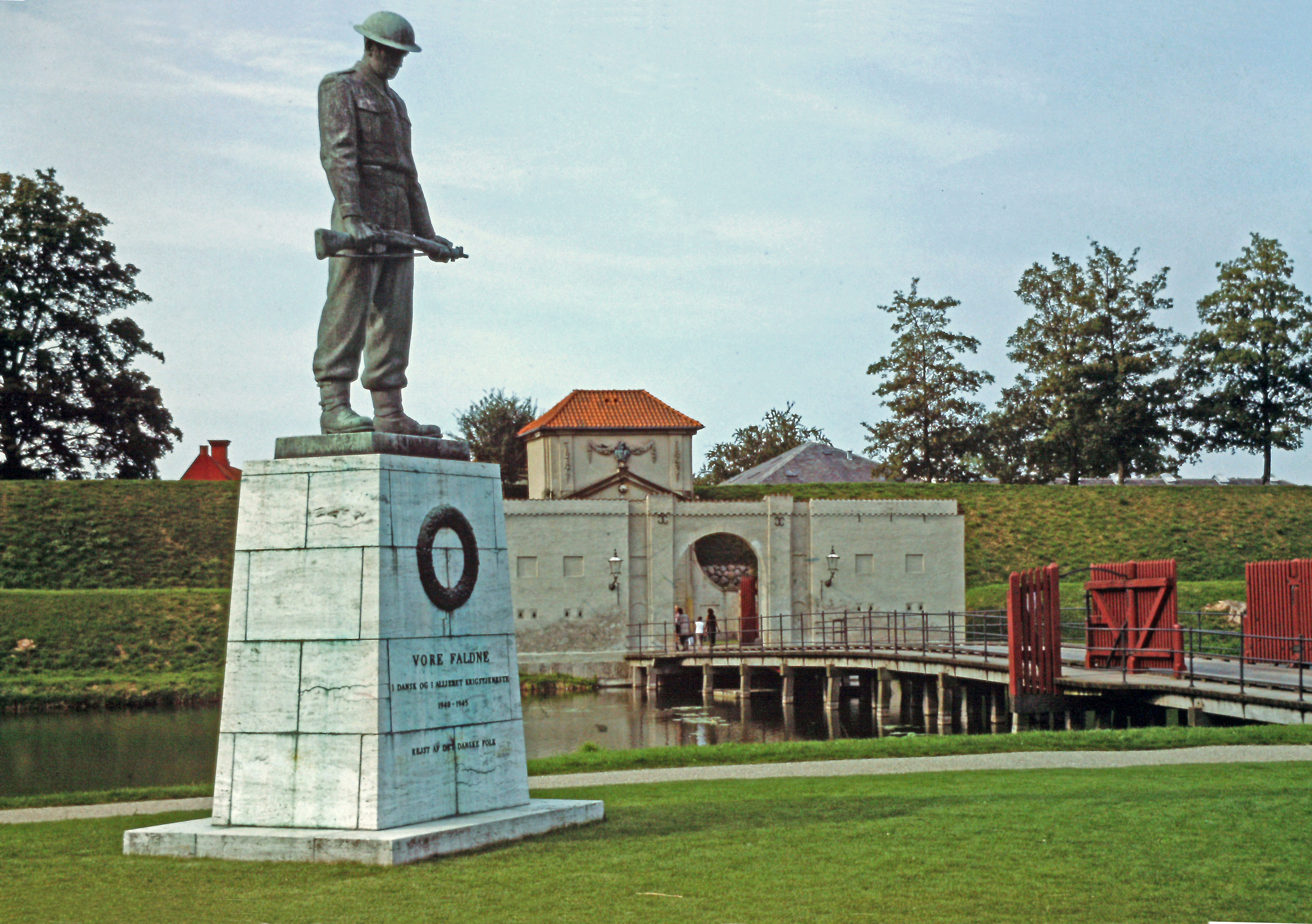
Our Fallen by Sven Lindhard

=== War memorials ===
The namesake of the park, Winston Churchill, is commemorated with a bust designed by Oscar Nemon from 1955. Another bust, designed by Svend Lindhard and placed outside the Resistance Museum, commemorates Major Anders Lassen, the only Dane to have received the Victoria Cross for his efforts in World War II. Lindhard is also the artist behind a Memorial to fallen Danish soldiers in the Allied Forces, which stands on Sjællands Ravelin, the ravelin in front of the main entrance to Kastellet. It depicts a soldier in English uniform.

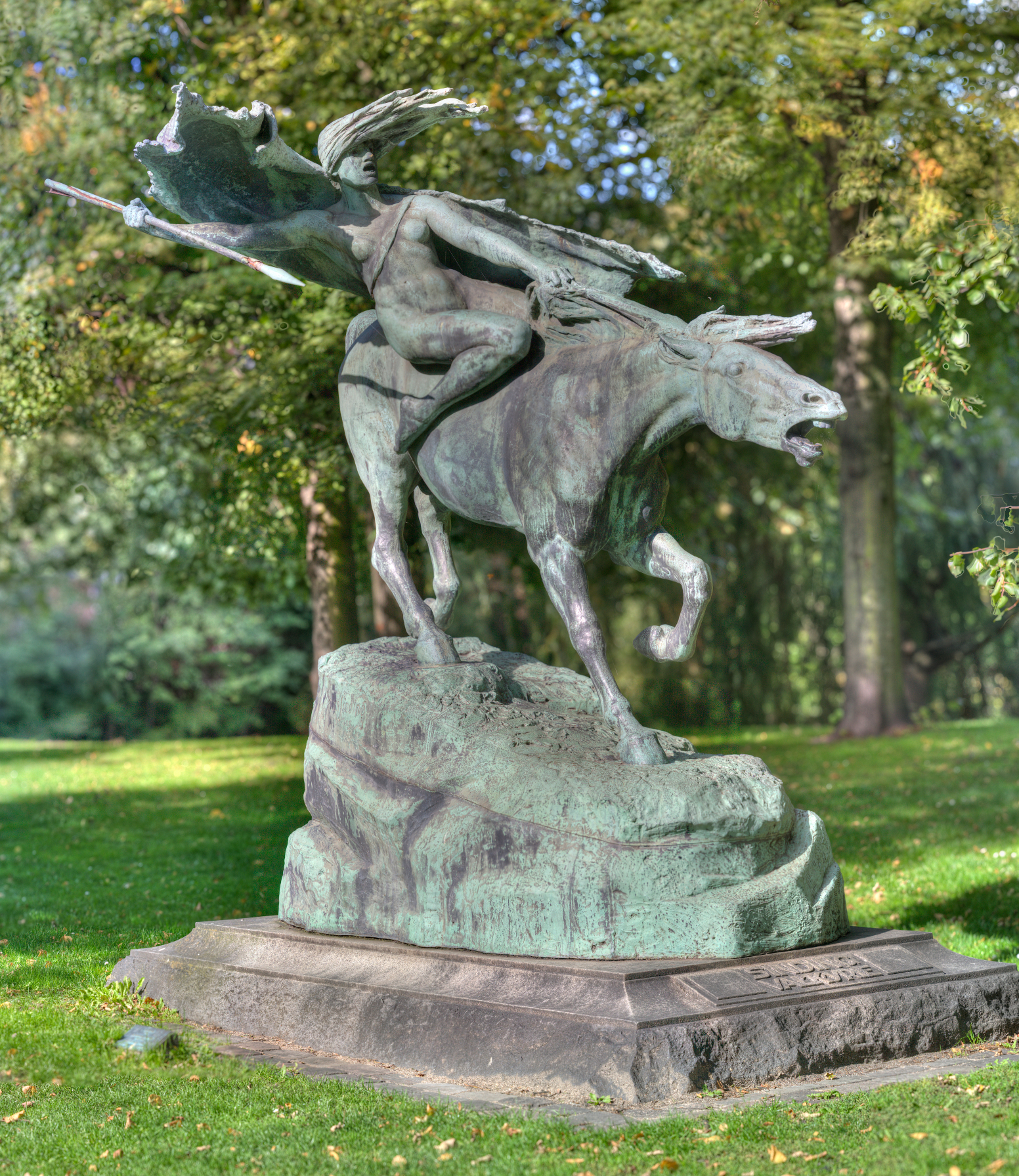
Valkyrie (1908) by Stephan Sinding

=== The Valkyrie ===
The park also features a bronze statue of a valkyrie, a female figure in Norse mythology who chooses who will die and battle and brings her chosen to Valhalla, an afterlife hall of the slain. It was designed by Stephan Sinding and executed in Paris in 1908 but is based on a sketch from 1872. A smaller version in painted wood, metal and coloured stone was exhibited in 1901 and another version from 1910, in bronze and ivory, is in the collections of the Ny Carlsberg Glyptotek. A gift from Carl Jacobsen's Albertine Trust which was created to provide statues and monuments for the parks and squares of Copenhagen, the present statue was originally placed at Langelinie close to the waterfront but was moved to its current park setting when the Kastellet was reconstructed in the 1990s.

== Cultural references ==
Benny (Morten Grunwald) and Kjeld (Poul Bundgaard) are seen being chased through the park at 0:48:36 in the 1972 Olsen-banden film The Olsen Gang's Big Score.

== Image gallery ==
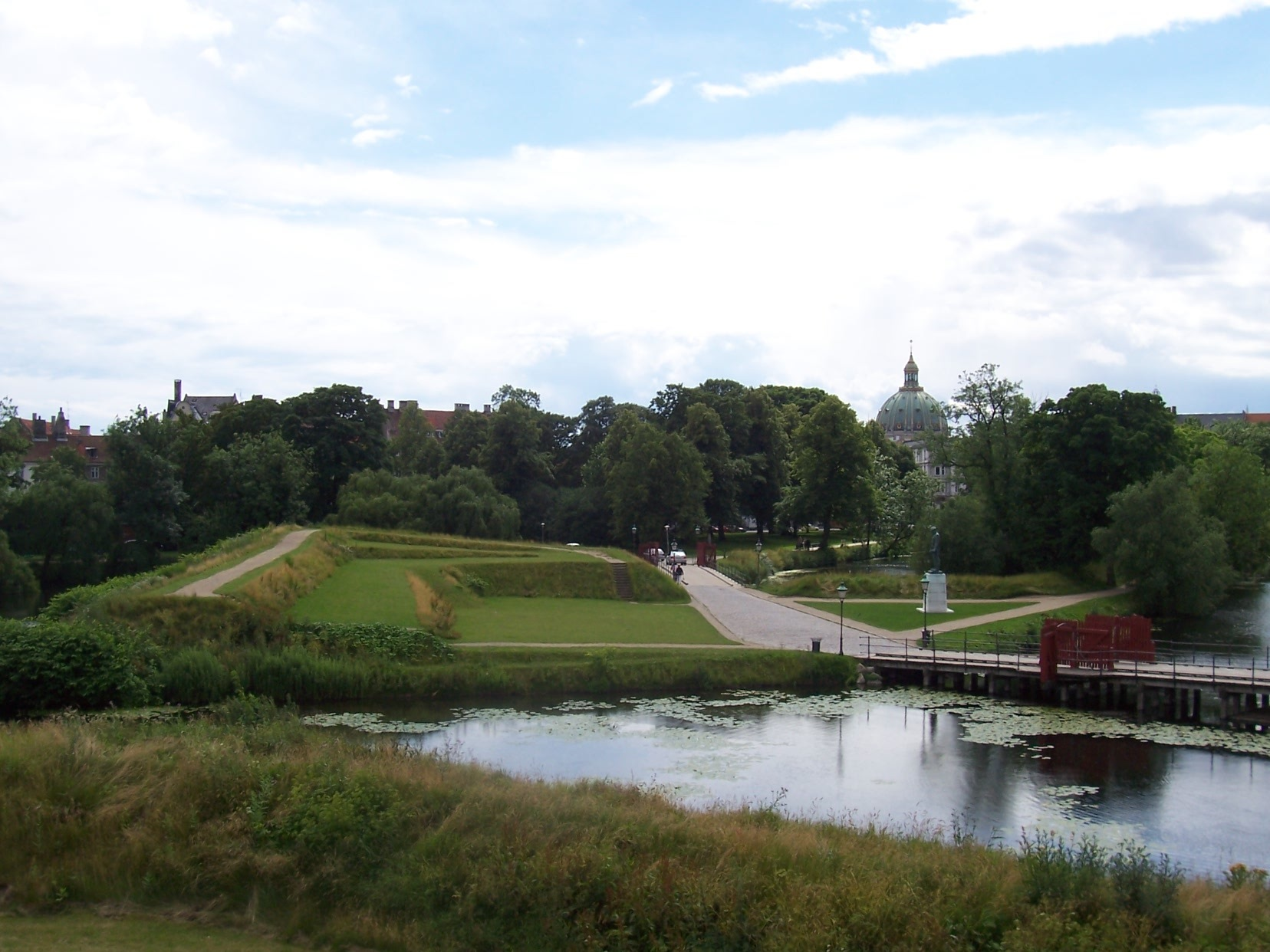

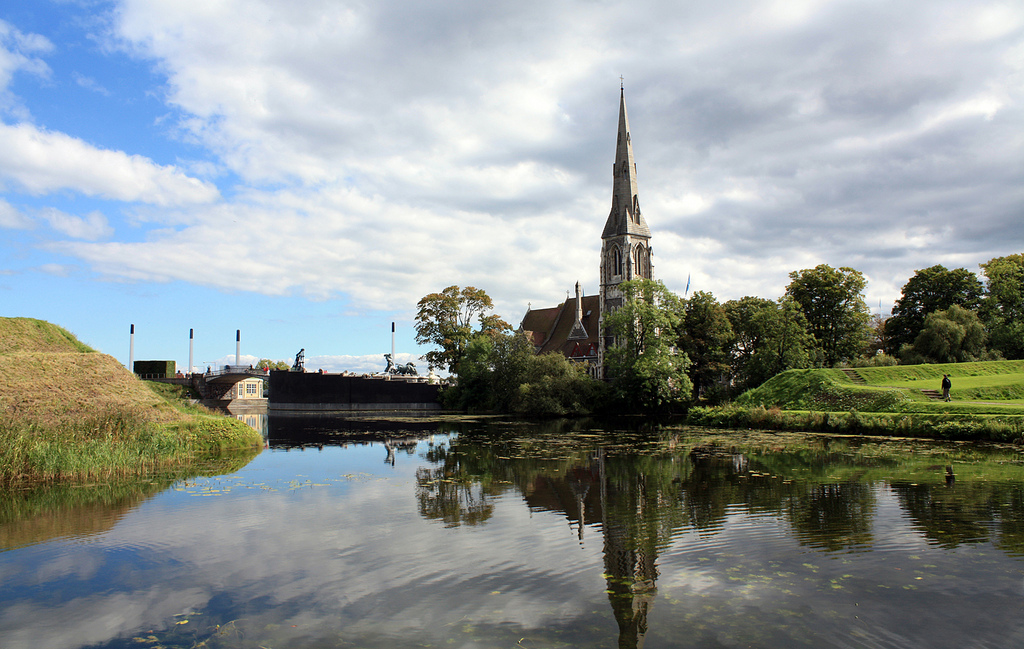

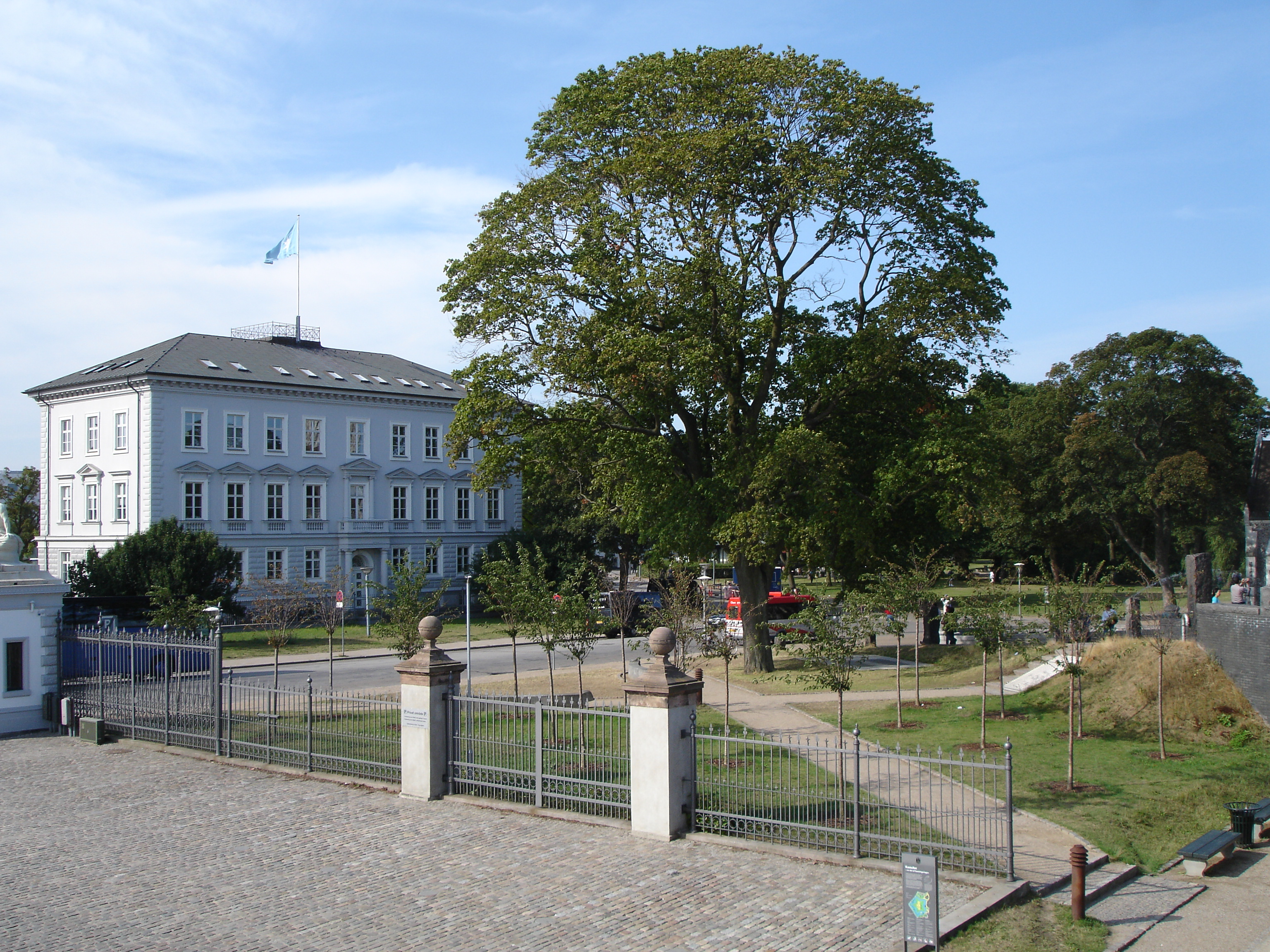

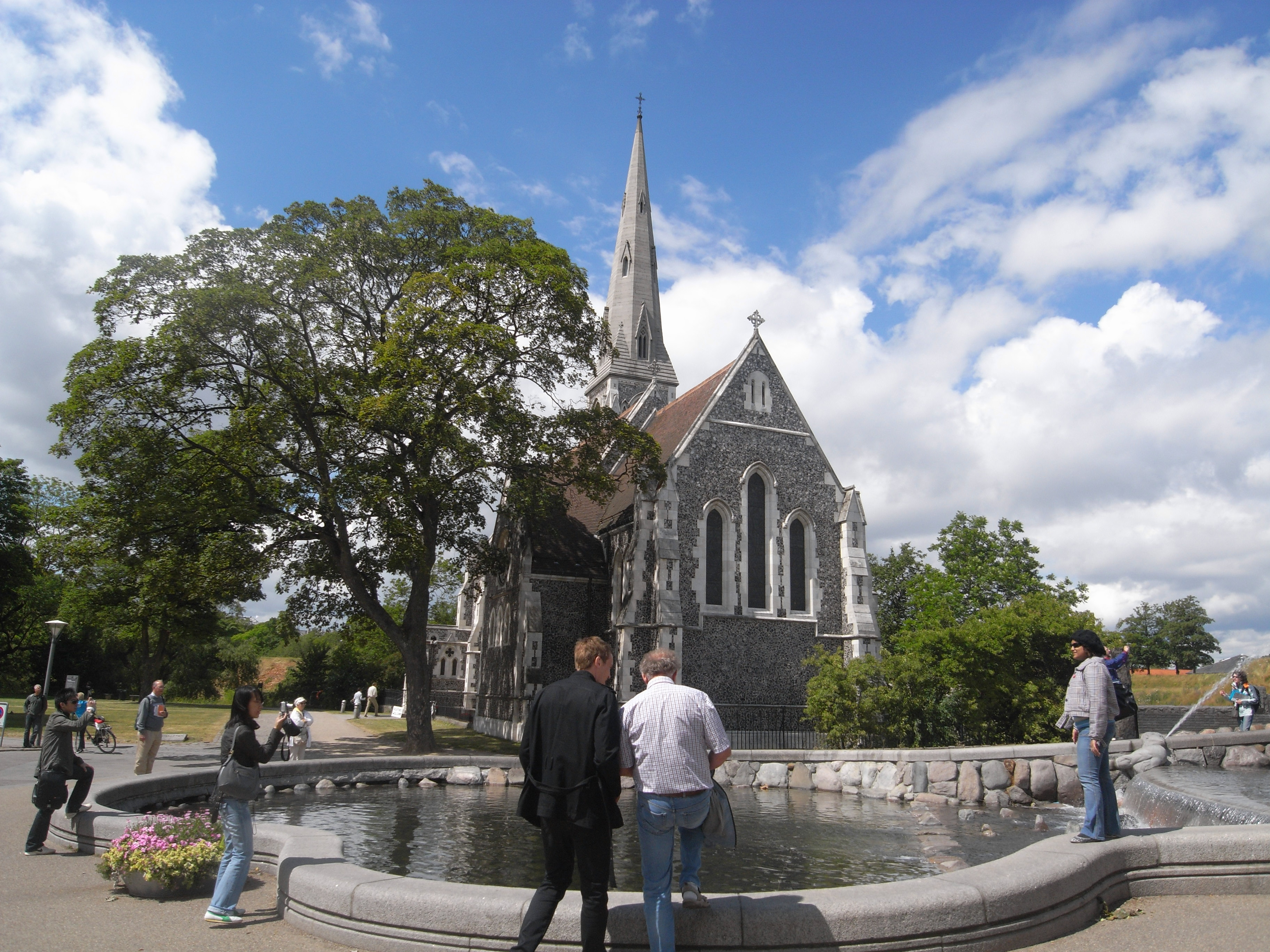

== See also ==
- Parks and open spaces in Copenhagen
