= Nordre Toldbod =

Waterfront area of Copenhagen, Denmark

Coordinates: 55.689°N 12.599°E

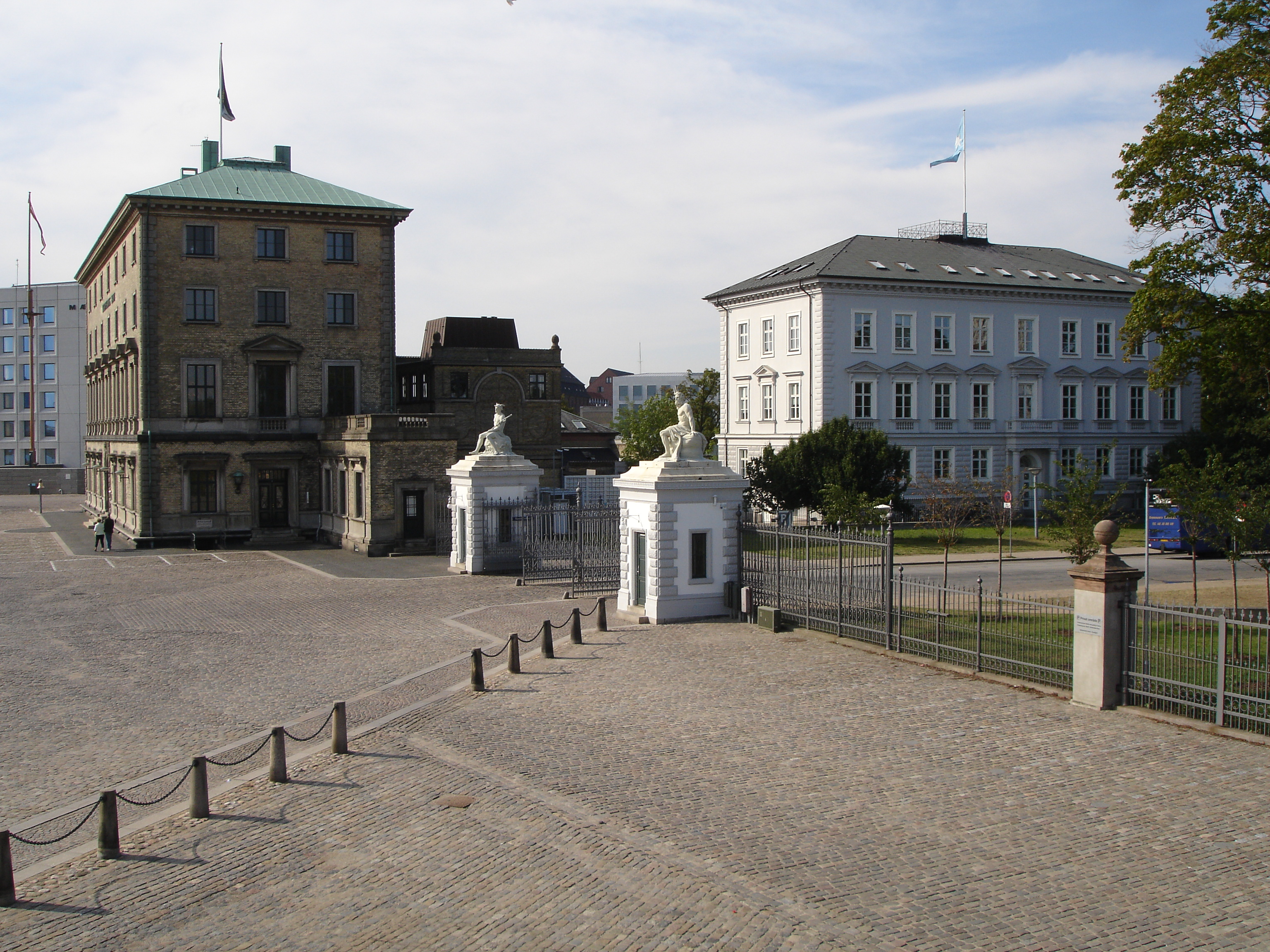
The gate toward Esplanaden

Nordre Toldbod is a waterfront area in Copenhagen, Denmark, located at the north end of Larsens Plads and just south of Kastellet. It takes its name after the custom house or toldbod which used to be located in the area. Most of the historic buildings in the area were torn down in 1973 when the site was redeveloped but its central waterfront space has remained intact and features a number of structures which bear testament to its former use. Among the modern buildings in the area are the headquarters of Mærsk and the Danish Energy Agency. The area is adjacent to Churchill and Langelinie Parks.

== History ==
=== The Custom House ===
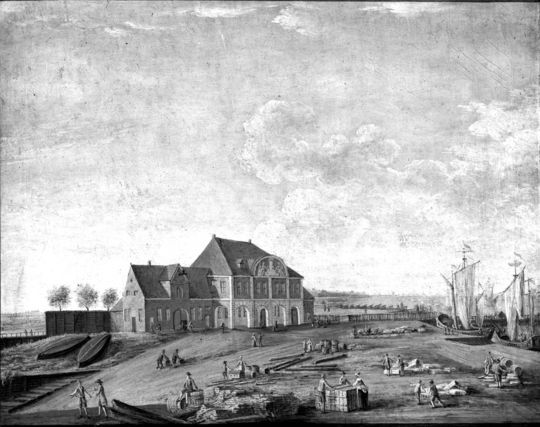
King Christian VI's Custom House in 1754

In Copenhagen, customs duties have been collected from ships since the 13th century. In 1617, the Royal Anchor Forge came into use as a custom house but when the king's grand plans for St. Ann's Rotunda, a monumental naval development, were abandoned and it was decided to convert the Anchor Forge to a naval church in its place, now the Church of Holmen, the custom house was moved to the other side of the harbour where it found a temporary home in a 10-bay building at Christianshavn. In 1628, it was moved back across the harbour where a new custom house had been constructed on a filled site north of the city. The entrance to the harbour was blocked with a barrier at night which marked the boundary between the northern and southern custom house areas.

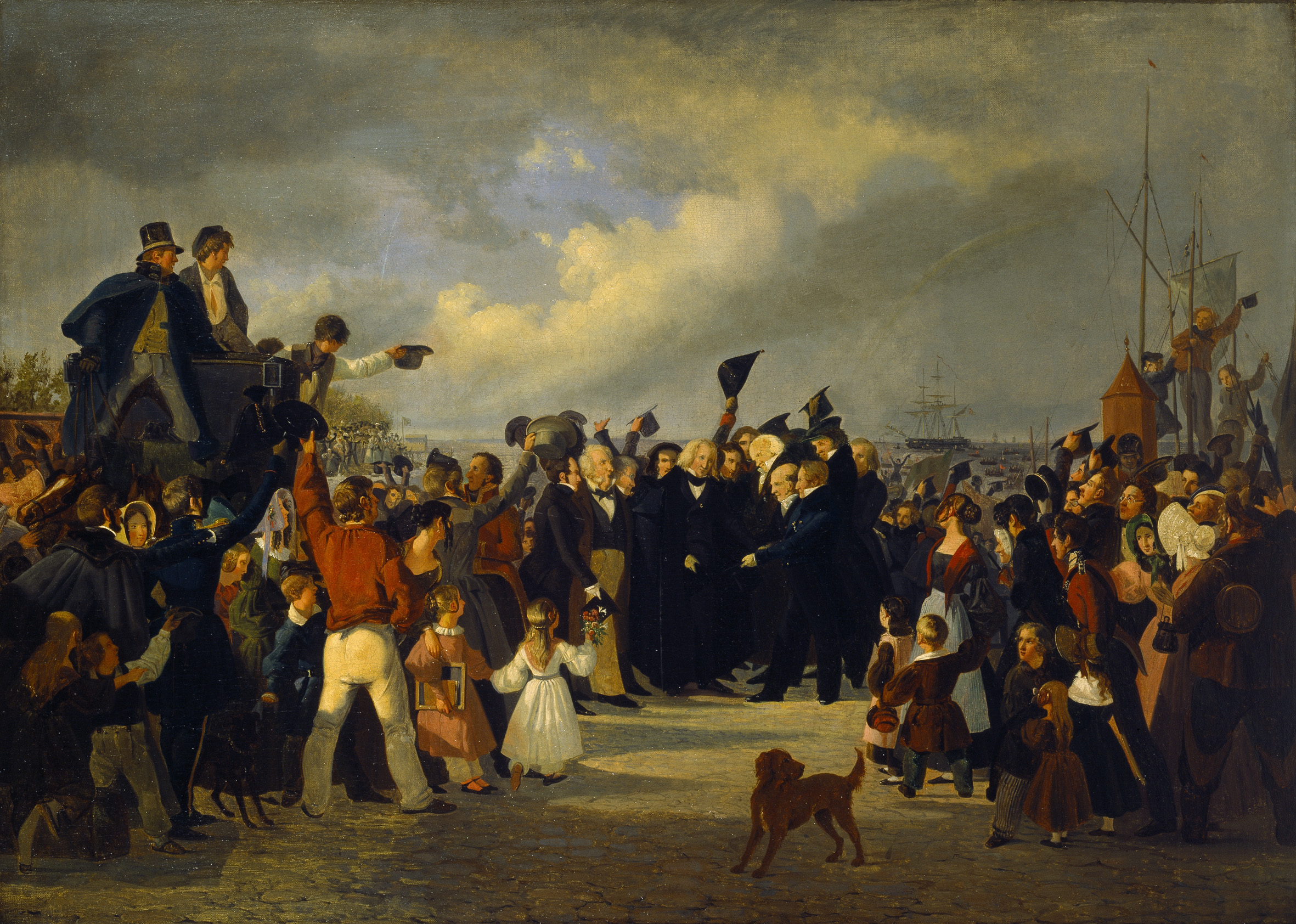
Thorvaldsen's arrival at the Custom House quay

King Christian VI ordered the construction of a new custom house which was completed on the same site in 1734 to a Baroque design by Johan Cornelius Krieger.

=== Royal Reception Quay ===
The quay at Nordre Toldbod also served as the place where foreign monarchs and other peers were received when they arrived at Copenhagen by ship. It was also the place where the sculptor Bertel Thorvaldsen was received, with great festivity, on 17 September 1838, when he returned home after four decades in Rome.

=== Late 19th-century change ===
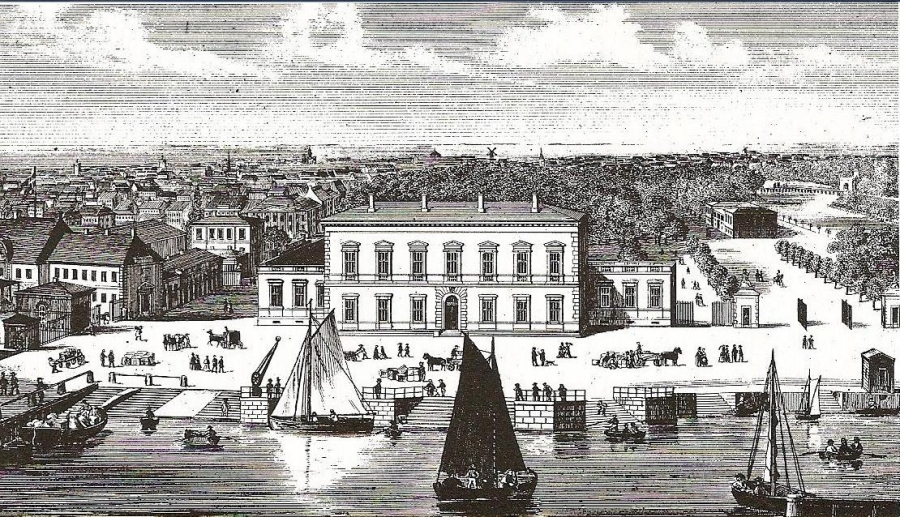
Dahlerup's building for the Port Authority (1868) seen before Christian VI's custom house (left) was demolished

The last decades of the 19th century brought change to the area. A new building for the Port Authority was built in 1868 to a design by Vilhelm Dahlerup and Frederik Bøttger, and a new custom house designed by Vilhelm Petersen was built a little further south between 1872 and 1875. The new Free Port was inaugurated just north of Kastellet in 1884. Christian VI's custom house at the boundary between Søndre and Nordre Toldbod was torn down in 1891 to make way for a new warehouse for goods in transit, the Frilagerbygningen building.

=== Recent history ===
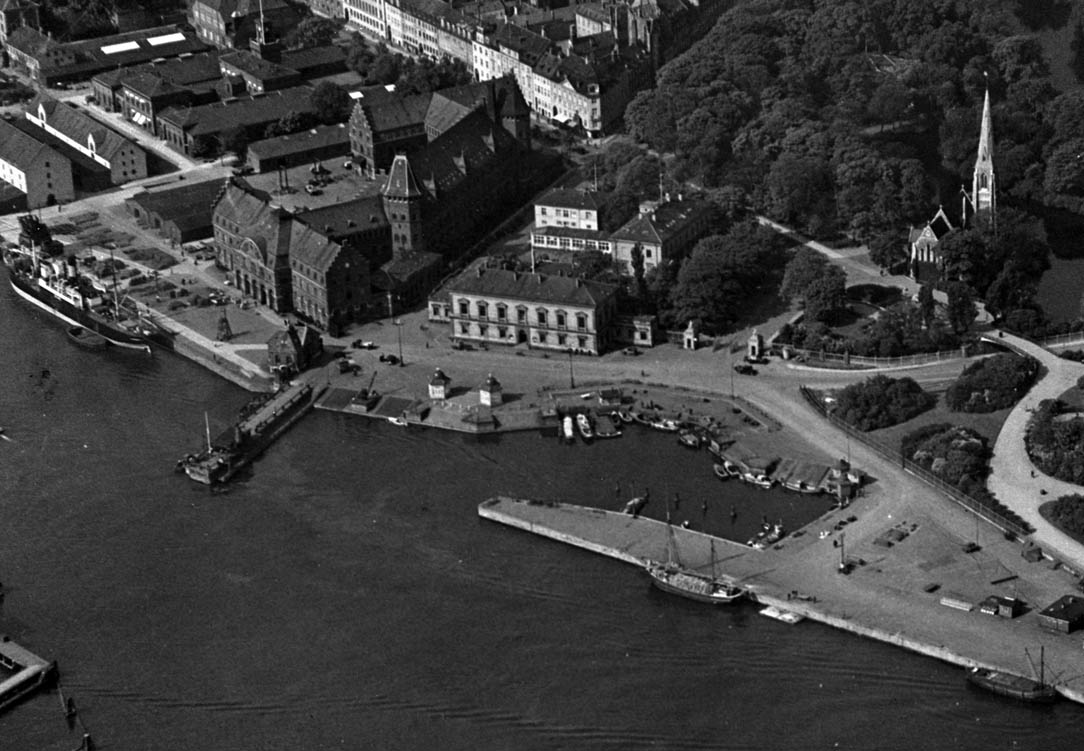
Nordre Toldbod

In 1973 the majority of the buildings in the area were torn down. Most of the land was sold to A. P. Møller-Mærsk which built a new head office designed by Ole Hagen on the corner of Nordre Toldbod and Esplanaden between 1974 and 1979. To the south of that, a new building for the Customs Department (Danish: Toldvæsenet) was constructed to a design by Niels and Eva Koppel. The latter has later been taken over by the Danish Energy Agency.

== Buildings and features ==
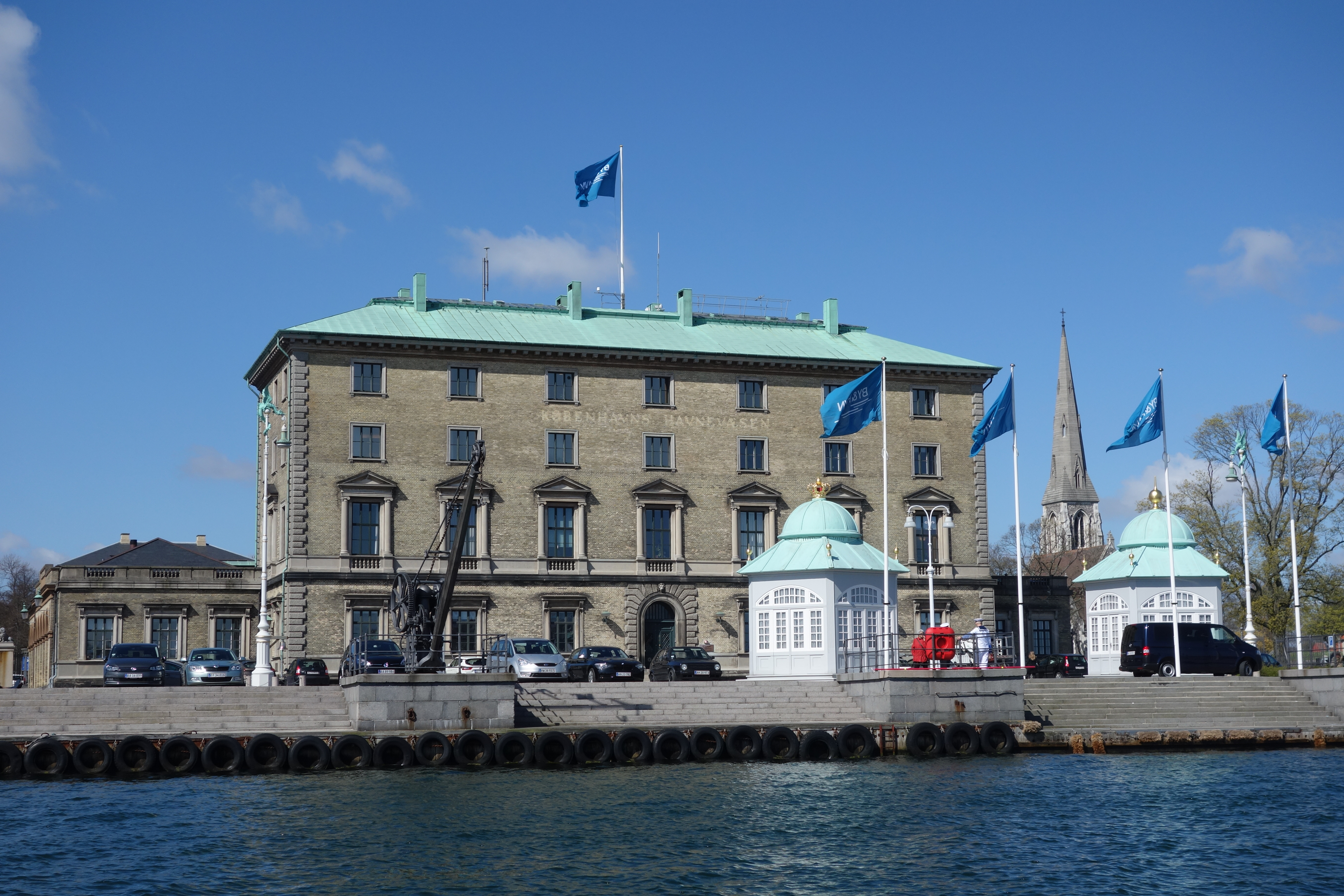
Dahlerup's Port Authority Building with the two Royal Pavilions

=== Port Authority Building ===
Vilhelm Dahlerup's building from 1868 for the Port Authority marks the western boundary of the quayside space at Nordre Toldbod. The design was inspired by Italian Renaissance architecture and the building originally consisted of two stories with a small one-story appendix topped by a balustrade on each side. The original building was extended with an extra floor by Einar Madvig and now consists of a three-story main building with two low lateral wings in 1939, and a rear wing was added in 1901. The building is now the head office of By & Havn.

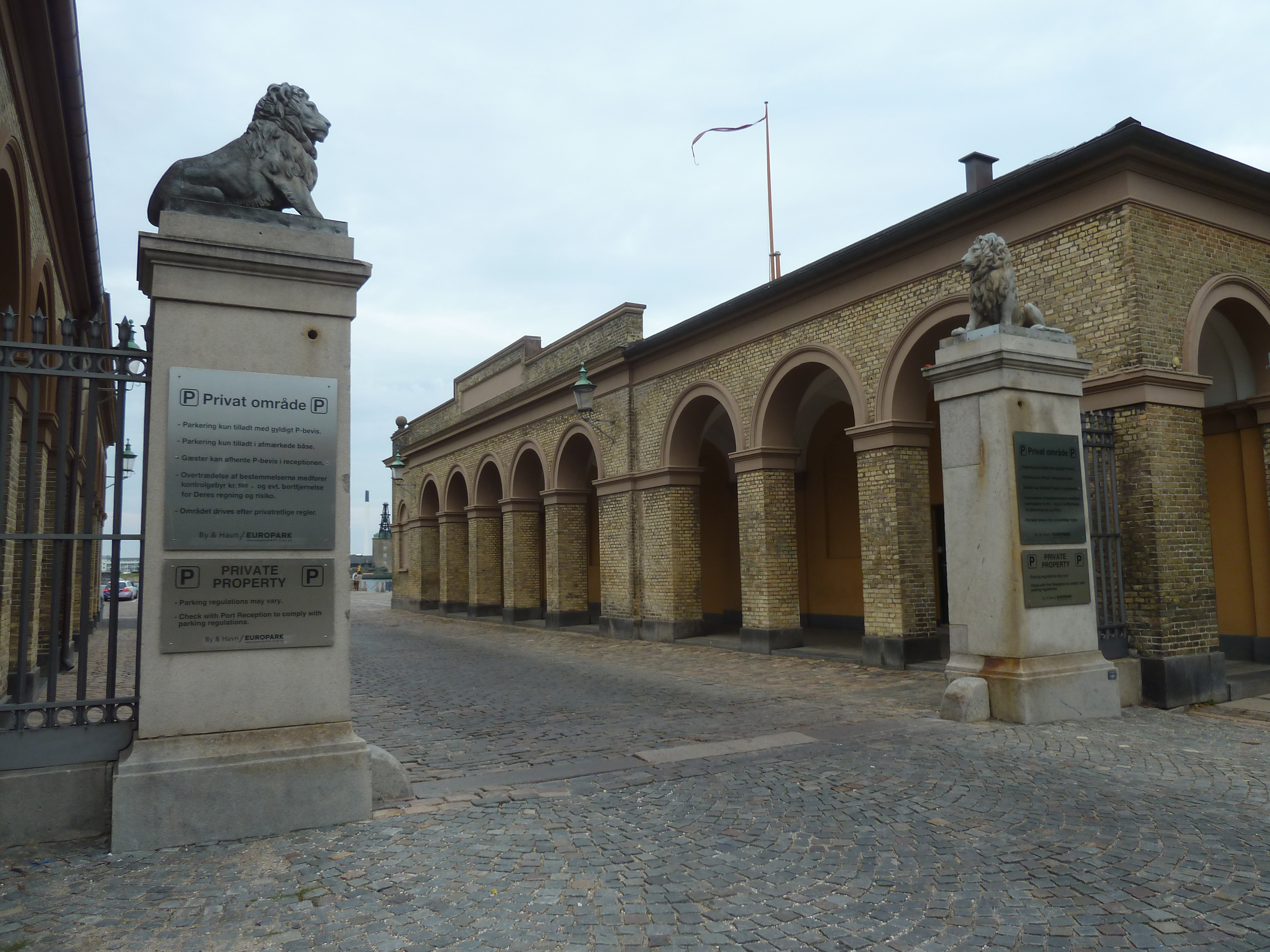
The old main entrance with the guardhouses

=== Main entrance ===
Located just south of the Port Authority Building, the former main entrance to the Nordre Toldbod area is a gate with gate pillars topped by lions. Just inside the gate, the access road passes between two long one-story buildings with 8-arch arcades facing the traffic. They were designed by Gustav Friedrich Hetsch and built in 1856.

=== Langelinie Gate and rough iron grill ===
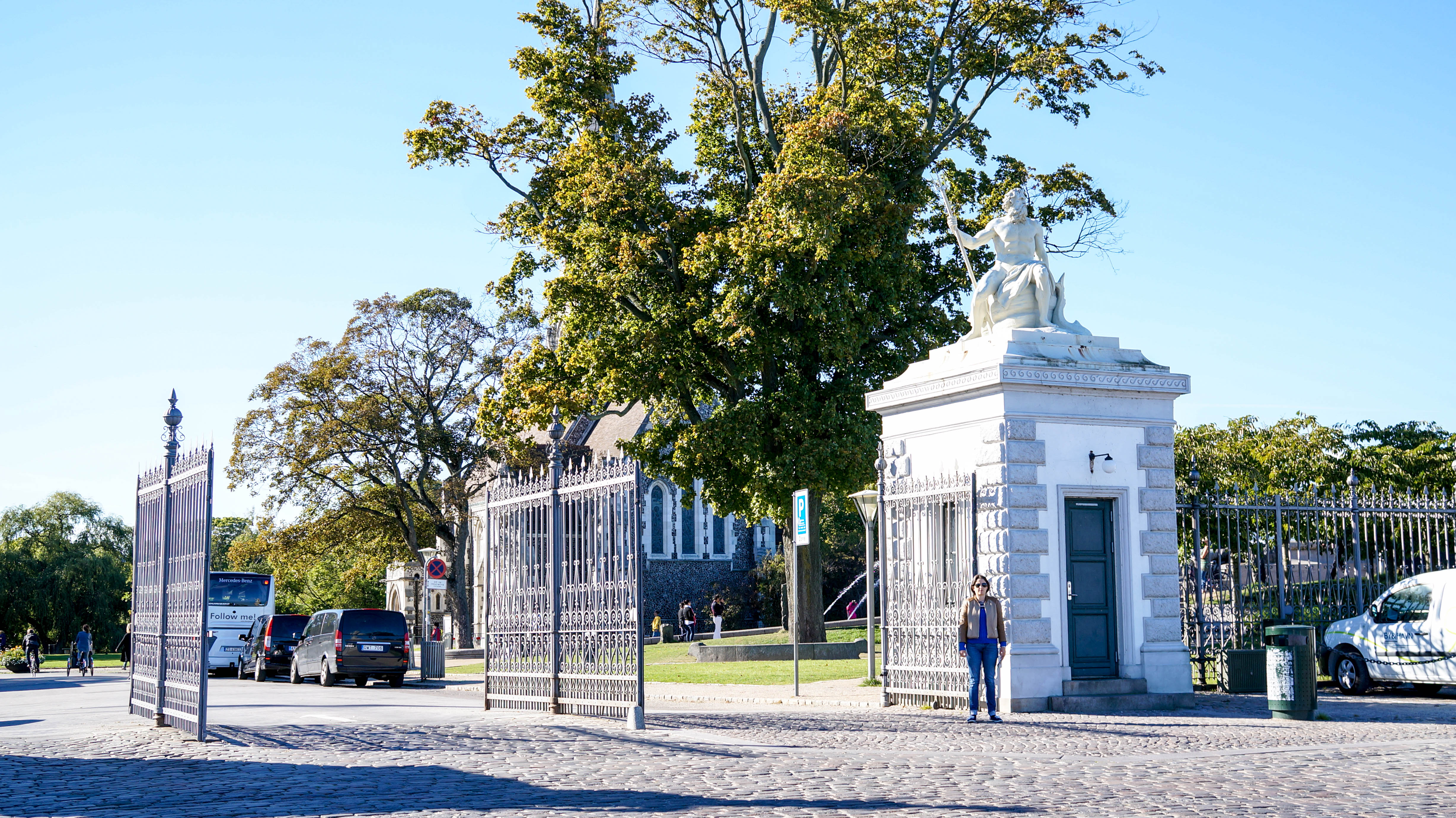
The old Freeport gate

The north side of the Port Authority's building connects to a rough iron fence which defines the northern boundary of the space. It is the only surviving section of the fence that used to surround the Freeport. The fence opens through a gate toward Langelinie. The gate pillars double as guardhouses and they are topped by two zinc statues depicting Neptune and Mercury.

=== Royal pavilions ===
The two small pavilions on the quay in front of the Port Authority Building were built in 1905. It remains unclear who designed them but they are attributed to Osvald Rosendahl Langballe. They are today used when the Royal Family crosses the harbour to board HDMY Dannebrog, the Royal Yacht, which is docked at Holmen.

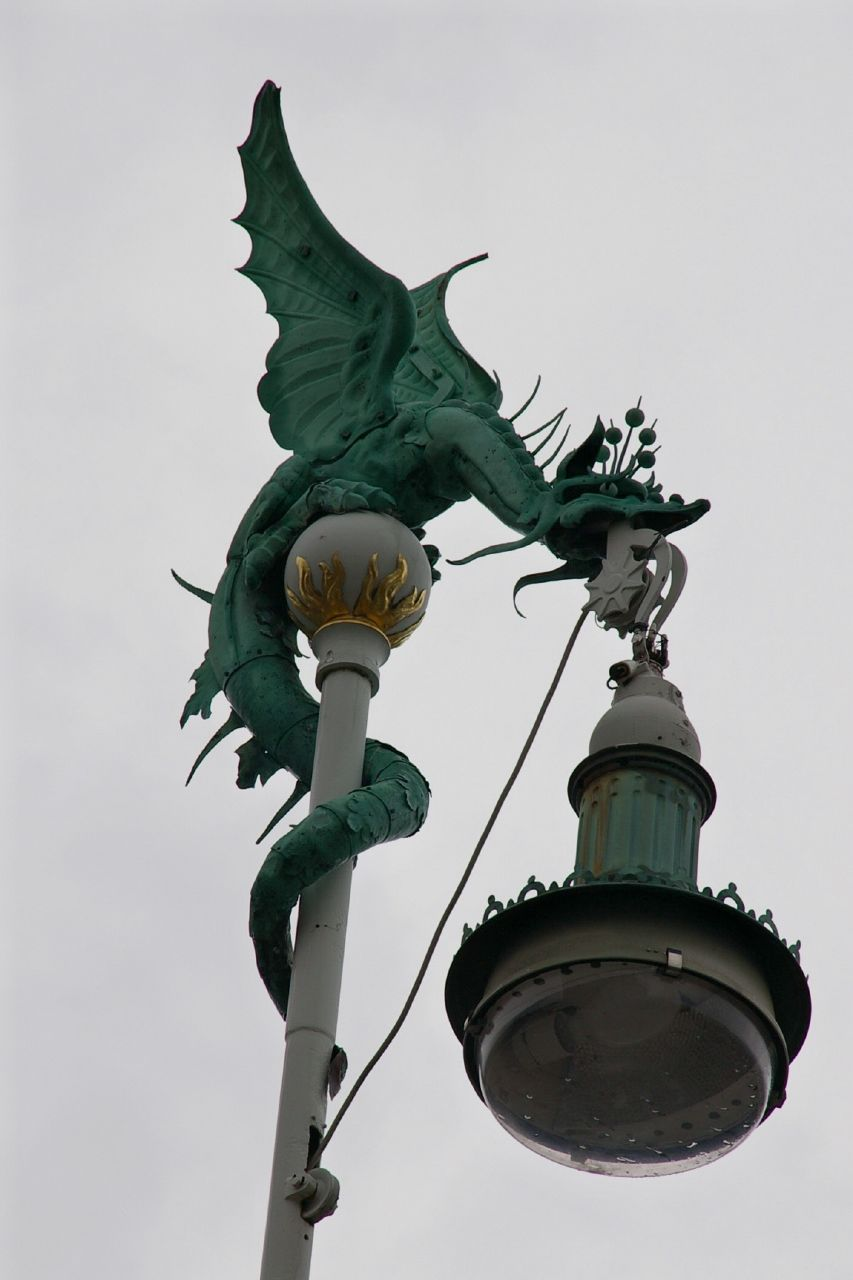
One of Dahlerup's Dragon street lights

=== Dragon street lights ===
The place where the royal challup lands is also flanked by two street lights topped by dragon figures which hold the fixtures. One of the dragons has red eyes. They were designed by Vilhelm Dahlerup and installed in 1892.

In connection with their design of a master plan for the nearby Amerika Plads area, the architectural practice West 8 created a special street light for the new neighbourhood which is a Cubist reinterpretation of Dahlerup's dragon lights at Nordre Toldbod.

=== Gefion Fountain ===
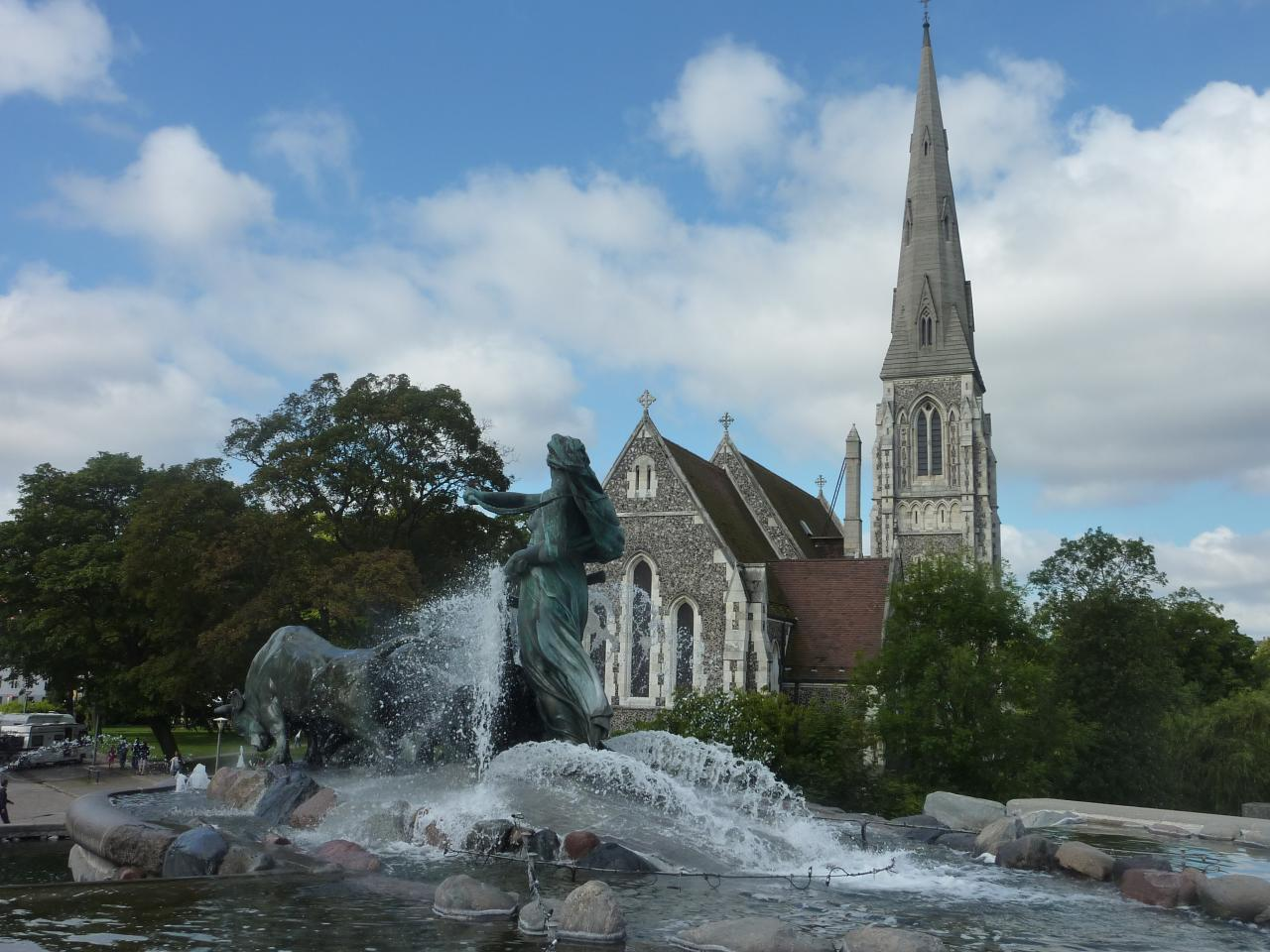
The Gefion fountain with St. Alban's English Church in neighbouring Churchill Park as a backdrop

The Gefion Fountain is located immediately outside the Langelinie Gate and portrays the legendary Norse goddess Gefjun driving a group of oxen, a reference to a legend about the creation of Zealand.

=== Gefion Bridge ===
The Gefion Fountain is situated next to the Gefion Bridge, a foot bridge which provides access to Langelinie along an elevated promenade. Designed by Asger Ostenfeld and completed in 1894, it originally spanned the Free Port rail line which connected the Free Port to the custom house, but now appears in a new context after the restoration of Kastellet.

== Transport ==
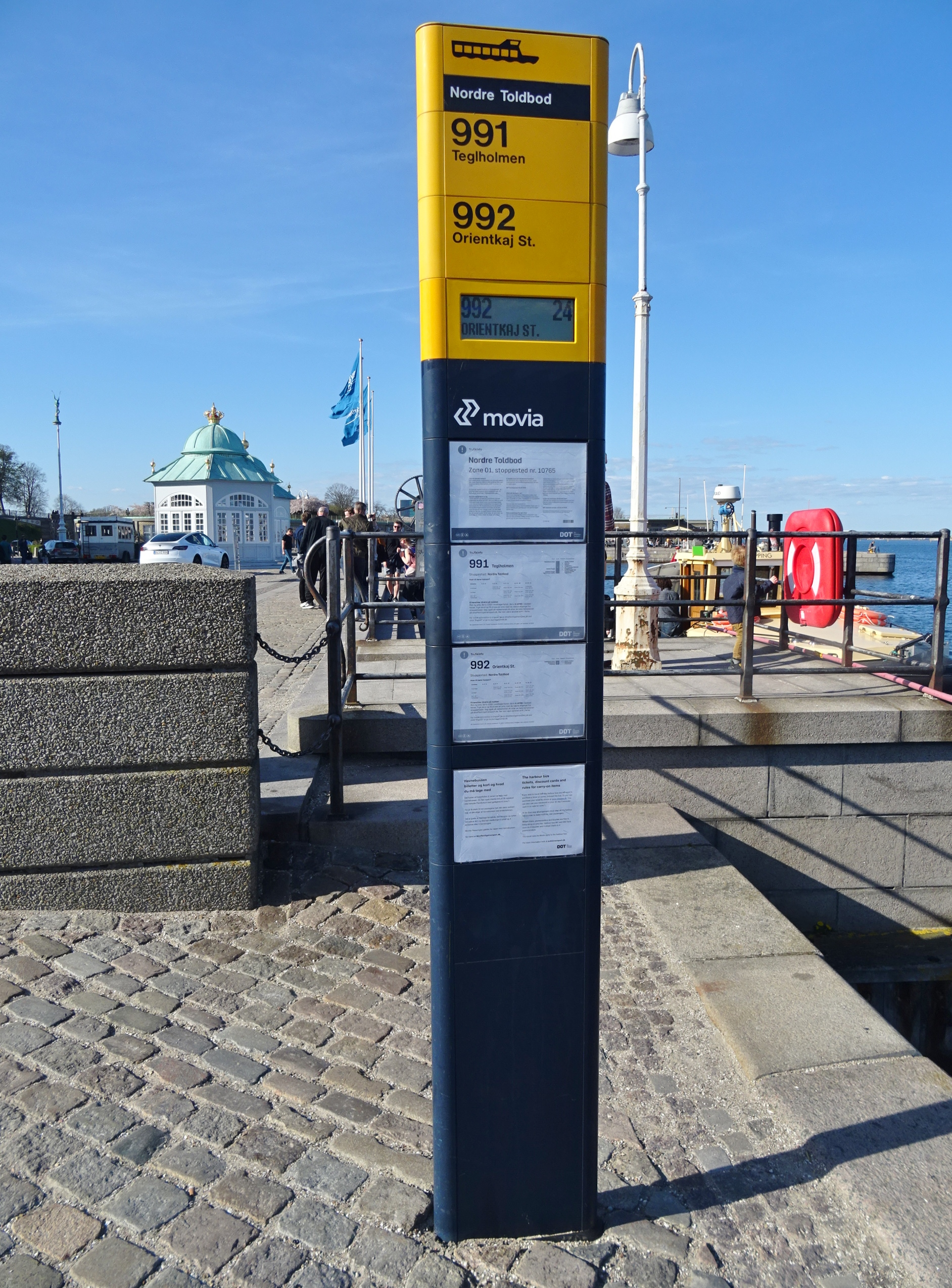

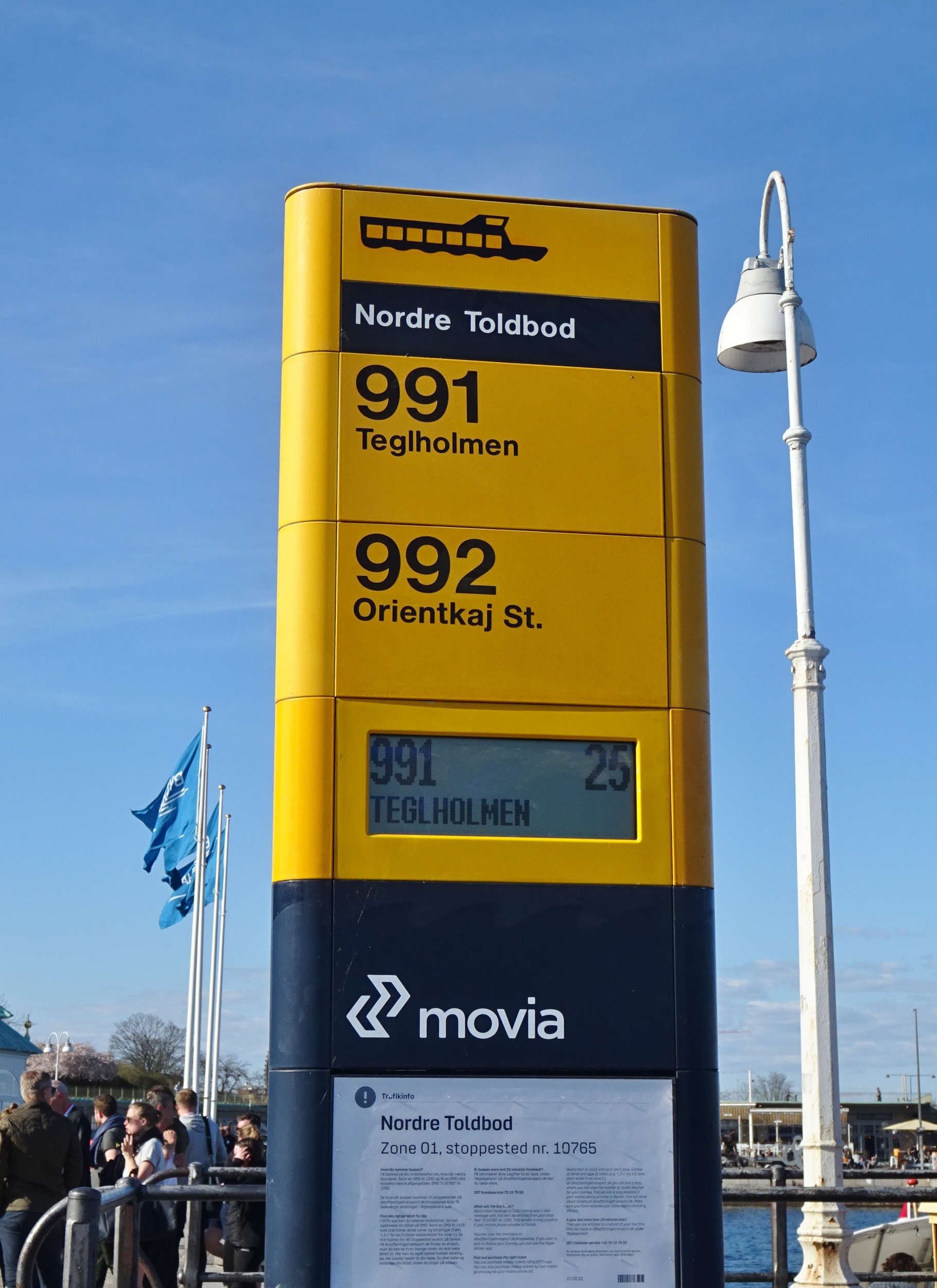

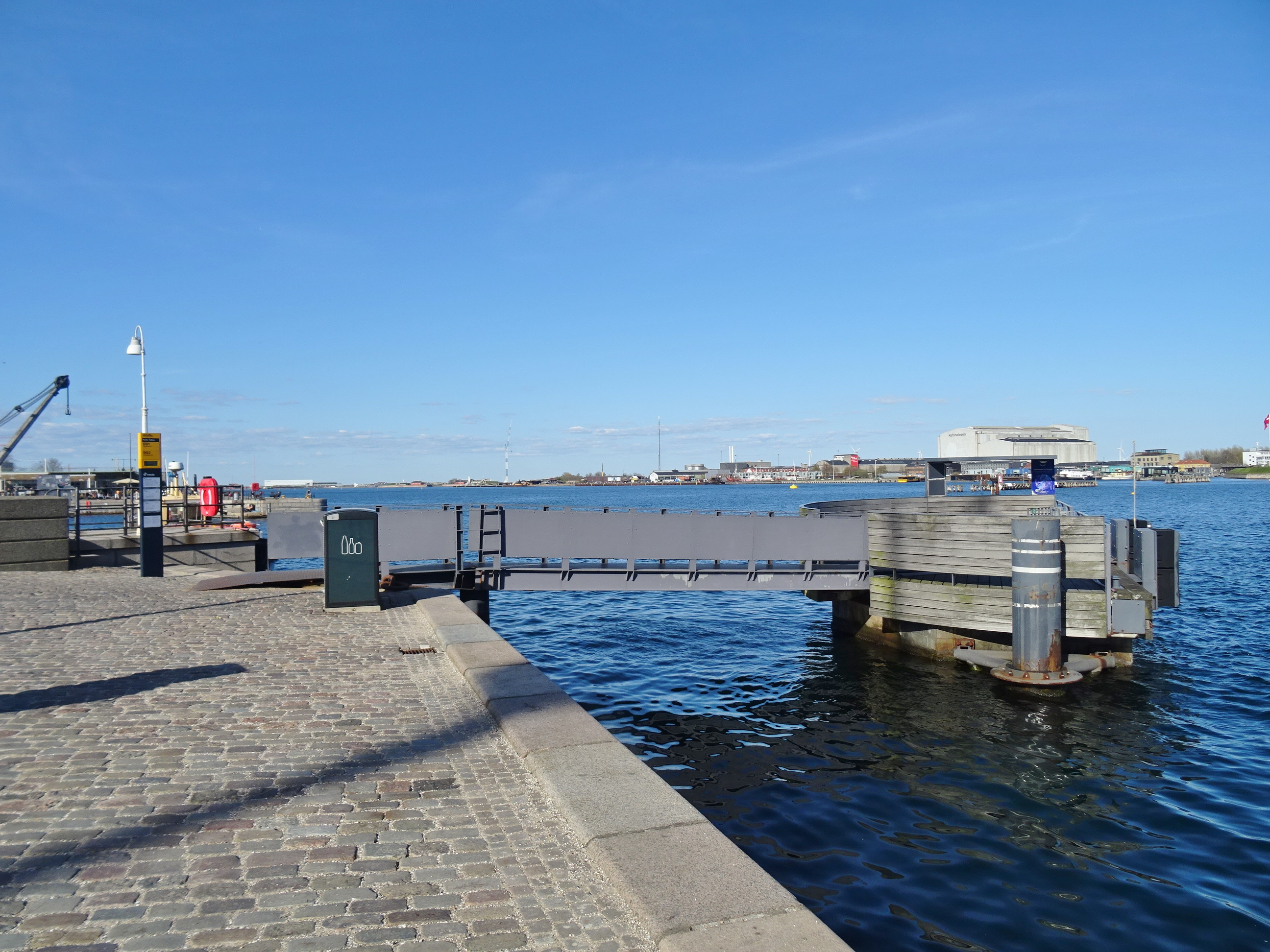

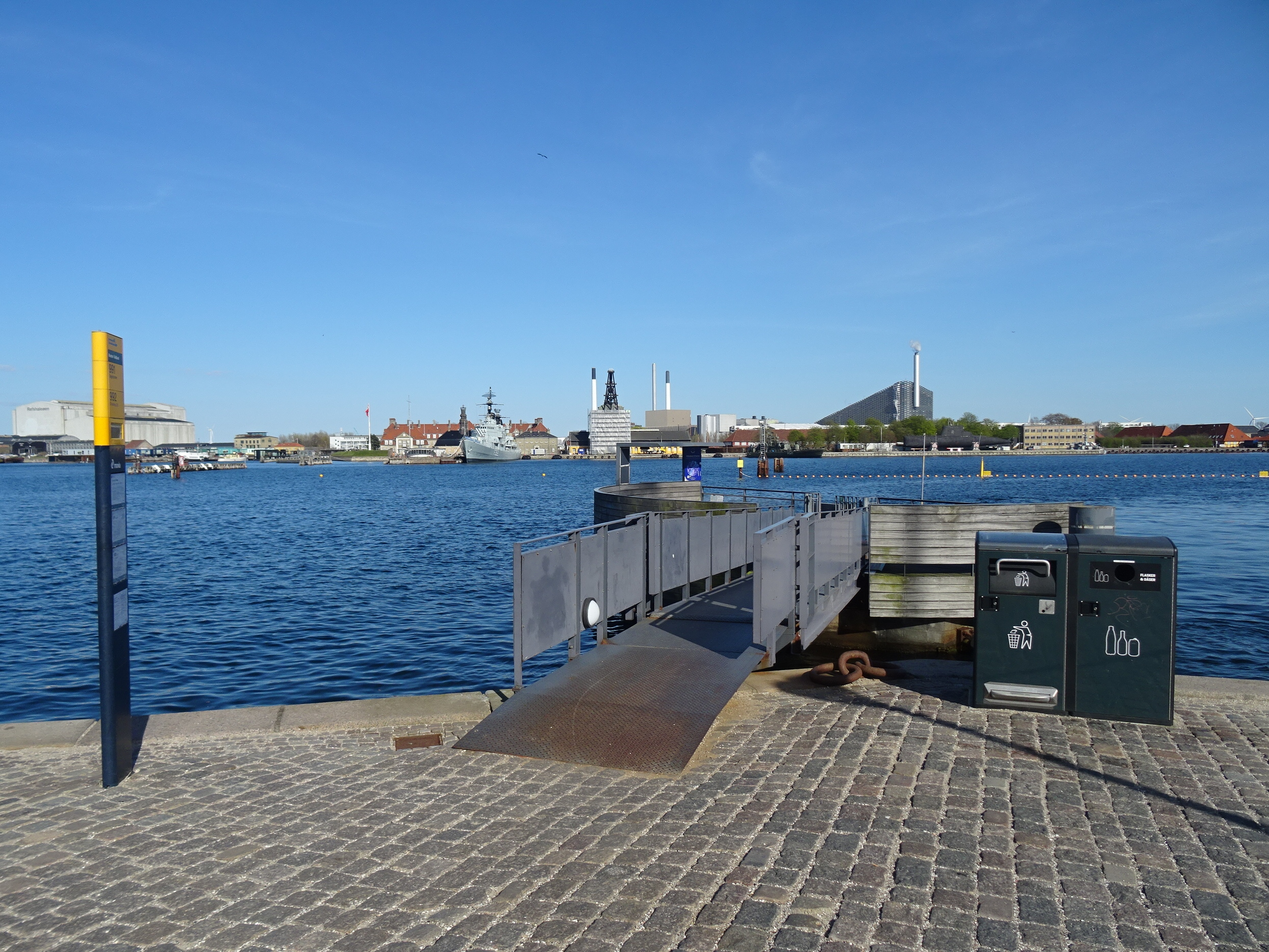
