= Danish Energy Agency =

Coordinates: 55.6868°N 12.5958°E

The Danish Energy Agency (Danish: Energistyrelsen) was established in 1976 as an agency of the Danish Ministry of Transport. It was part of the Ministry of Environment and Energy from 1994 to 2001. In 2007 it came under the newly created Danish Ministry of Climate and Energy The agency is headquartered at Carsten Niebuhrs Gade 43.

The agency is responsible for handling national and international agreements, tasks linked to production, supply and consumption of energy, and efforts to reduce greenhouse gas emissions. It oversees the legal and political frameworks for reliable, affordable and clean supply of energy in Denmark.
