= Royal Danish Nautical Charts Archive =

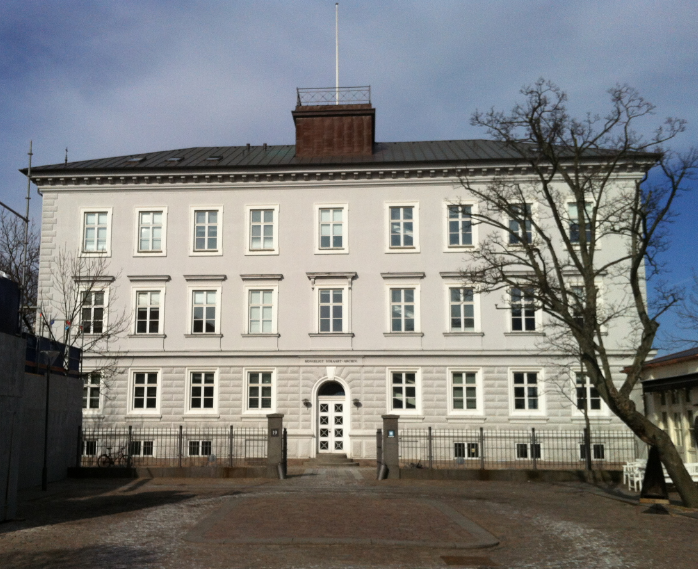
The Royal Nautical Charts Archives' former building at Esplanaden

The Royal Danish Nautical Charts Archive (Danish: Det Kongelige danske Søkortarkiv) was a Danish Navy department, responsible for making accurate nautical charts for the Danish government, primary the Navy, for nearly 200 years. Its former building at Toldbodvej, now Esplanaden, was also the first home of the Danish Meteorological Institute. The building was used as an extension office for Maersk Group services, but is being renovated and will soon house the Maersk Foundation offices.

== History ==
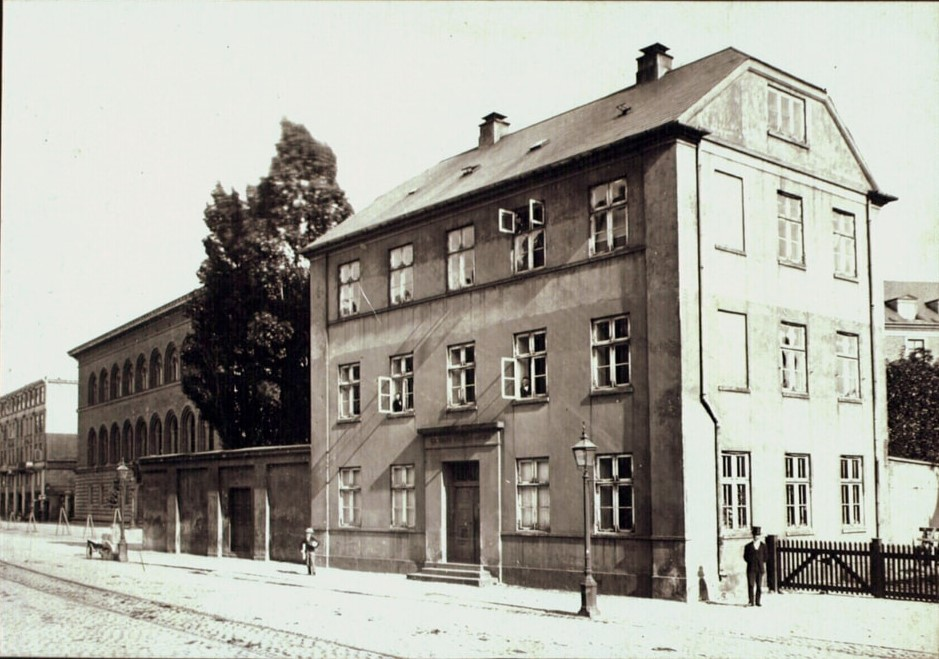
The Royalm Naval Charts Archives' old building in Holmens Kanal

The Royal Danish Nautical Charts Archive was initiated by royal resolution of 25 October 1784, at the initiative of a naval captain, Poul Løvenørn, who would also become the first director of the department. It was originally located on Holmens Kanal, next to Holmen Church.

On 1 April 1973 the department, together with Lodsvæsenet (the pilot service), Fyrvæsenet (the lighthouse service) and Redningsvæsenet (the rescue service), was merged into Farvandsdirektoratet, in that process changing its name to Nautisk Afdeling and gaining a few more responsibilities. By royal resolution of 9 October 1987, the nautical chart production part was detached and combined with Geodætisk Institut and Matrikeldirektoratet to form Kort & Matrikelstyrelsen, where it today is a department called Søkortområdet.

According to resolution of 1816, nautical charts produced by Søkortarkivet have no copyright expiration date. They are permanently copyright protected by the Danish government. This order is still valid, according to the Danish copyright law § 92.

== Directors ==
- 1784–1826 Poul de Løvenørn
- 1826–1853 Christian Christopher Zahrtmann
- 1853–1888 Hans Peter Rothe
- 1889–1898 Carl Frederick Wandel
- 1899–1909 Gustav Frederik Holm
- 1909–1919 Christian Bloch
- 1919–1933 H. O. Ravn
