= North West Shelf Operational Oceanographic System =

Oceanography facility

The North West Shelf Operational Oceanographic System (NOOS) monitors physical, sedimentological and ecological variables for the North Sea area. NOOS is operated by partners from the nine countries bordering the extended North Sea and European North West Shelf; Belgium, Denmark, France, Germany, Ireland, Netherlands, Norway, Sweden, and United Kingdom. Working collaboratively to develop and implement ocean observing systems in the area. Near real time and recent history sea levels are available to on their web site in map, graph or table format.

== Membership ==
As of January 2008 NOOS had sixteen full members and four associate members.

- Full Members:
  - Bundesamt für Seeschifffahrt und Hydrographie (BSH), Germany
  - Centre for Environment, Fisheries and Aquaculture Science (CEFAS), UK
  - Danish Maritime Safety Administration (DaMSA), Denmark
  - Danish Meteorological Institute (DMI), Denmark
  - Flemish Authorities - MD&K Coastal Division, Belgium
  - French Research Institute for Exploitation of the Sea (IFREMER), France
  - Institute of Marine Research (IMR), Norway
  - Koninklijk Nederlands Meteorologisch Instituut (KNMI), Netherlands
  - Management Unit of the North Sea Mathematical Models (MUMM), Belgium
  - Marine Institute, Ireland
  - Met Office, UK
  - National Institute for Coastal and Marine Management, Rijkswaterstaat (RIKZ), Netherlands
  - Norwegian Meteorological Institute (MET Norway), Norway
  - Proudman Oceanographic Laboratory (POL), UK
  - Service Hydrographique et Oceanographique de la Marine (SHOM), France
  - Swedish Meteorological and Hydrological Institute (SMHI), Sweden
- Associate Members
  - GKSS Forschungszentrum (GKSS), Germany
  - Nansen Environmental and Remote Sensing Center (NERSC), Norway
  - Norwegian Institute for Water Research (NIVA), Norway
  - University of Oldenburg (Uni-Oldenburg), Germany
