= NSFW (disambiguation) =

NSFW is Internet slang/shorthand for subject matter that is not safe/suitable for work.

NSFW may also refer to:

- NSFW (Ninja Sex Party album), a 2011 studio album by Ninja Sex Party
- NSFW (Tyga album), a 2025 studio album by Tyga
- NSFW (Shameless), an episode of the American TV series Shameless
- NSFW magazine, a photography magazine
- "NSFW Show", a podcast series produced by TWiT.tv
- "NSFW", a song from the album IV: Revenge of the Vengeance by comedy band Psychostick
- "NSFW", an EP by The Paradox
