= Netherlands Worldwide Students =

Dutch student organization

Netherlands Worldwide Students (Dutch: Nederlandse Wereldwijde Studenten), NWS for short, is a Dutch student organisation

NWS forms a worldwide network of Dutch students currently, formerly and prospectively enrolled at foreign universities or professional schools. It offers a platform for joint activities and bridges the gap to the government, private sector, academic sector and society of the Netherlands. Most importantly, NWS tries to maintain a strong connection between Dutch students abroad and the Netherlands, and vice versa. Integral to this mission is making sure that the voices of Dutch students abroad are being heard in policy debates and that the value of studying abroad is appreciated from an individual, economic and societal perspective.

NWS Clubs form an integral part of the NWS network, offering local activities, seminars, borrels and Dutch gezelligheid at universities outside of the Netherlands. NWS Clubs are active at Harvard, Cornell, Oxford, Cambridge, LSE, Paris and Bruges, amongst others.

In addition, NWS maintains an online database of Dutch students currently or formerly enrolled at foreign universities. This network provides its participants access to local contacts, knowledge and advice in any sector or country to facilitate studying abroad or returning to the Netherlands. NWS also has its own Wiki-based site, for user-generated information on studying abroad, foreign universities, financial aid and such.

NWS was founded in 2007 by and for students and is completely run by volunteers. It is registered as a charity and receives support from Nuffic, the IB-Group, as well as several Dutch multinationals through sponsorship for events.

As part of their activities, NWS conducts research on studying abroad through surveys among its members. The findings are presented in the "NWS-onderzoek" research report, which is published every other year. After publicatiosen, the report is presented to a representative of the Dutch government. Previous representatives to receive the report include Sybrand Haersma Buma and former State Secretary of Education Halbe Zijlstra. In past years, the research report has focused on obstacles for Dutch students in going abroad and returning to the Netherlands.

Over the past few years, NWS has increasingly become involved in informing Dutch secondary school and university students about the opportunities for studying abroad.
