= Albertina Foundation (Denmark) =

The Albertina Foundation (Danish: Legatet Albertina) was a philanthropic foundation created by Carl Jacobsen in 1879 with the aim of installing sculpture in the public realm, particularly in the parks, of Copenhagen, Denmark. The artworks include casts of classical Roman and Greek statues and works by contemporary artists. The foundation is named after Bertel Thorvaldsen, who in Italy went by the name of Alberto.

== History ==
The foundation was established on 19 October 1879. It was administrated by a board consisting of the founder and two other members appointed by the City Council and the Art Academy respectively. From the beginning, there were disagreements on the board as to what artworks to acquire. Jacobsen wanted contemporary French art while Ferdinand Meldahl, who represented the City Council, leaned towards Danish artists. As a compromise, 14 of the 15 sculptures which the foundation acquired during the first ten years of its existence were castings of classical works.

When Carl Jacobsen died in 1914, his oldest son, Holger Jacobsen, took over his seat on the board. Gradually, due to inflation, acquisitions dwindled. The foundation was finally dissolved on 19 November 2002, after 123 years of operations. The last funds were spent on Jørn Larsen's water feature on Bertel Thorvaldsens Plads in front of Thorvaldsens Museum.

== List of statues ==
Year	Image	Title	Location	Sculptor	Date	Source
1889		Dying Gaul	Ørsted Park	Unknown		Source
1880		Silenus with the Infant Bacchus	Ørsted Park	Efter Lysippos	4th century BC	Source
1882		Jeanne d'Arc at Domrémy Listening to the Heavenly Voice'	Ørsted Park	Henri-Michel-Antoine Chapu	1870	Source
1886		Satyr with the Infant Bacchus	Ørsted Park	Unknown	4th century BC	Source
1886		Satyr with Crotales	Ørsted Park	Unknown	C. 300 BC	Source
1886		The Grinder	Ørsted Park	Unknown	C. 250-200 BC	Source
1886		Apollo Belvedere	Ørsted Park	Efter Leochares	4th century BC / 1st or 2nd century AD	Source
1886		Hermes Resting	Ørsted Park	Unknown		Source
1886		Discus Thrower	Valby Idtrætspark	Unknown	5th century BC	Source
1887		Apollo Sauroctonos ("The Lizard Killer"	Ørstedsparken	Unknown	C. 350 BC	Source
1887		Resting Satyr	Ørsted Park	Unknown	C. 350 BC	Source
1887		Boy Satyr Playing the Flute	Ørsted Park	Unknown	4th century BC	Source
1887		The Wrestlers	Ørsted Park	Unknown	3rd century BC	Source
1887		Neapolitan Fisher Boy	Grønningen	Theobald Stein	1858-59	Sporce
1889		Boy Satyr Imbibing Wine	Ørsted Park	Louis Hasselriis	1888	Source
1889		Lion and Lioness	Jarmers Plads	Auguste Cain	1878	Source
1891		A Neapolitan Fisherman Teaches His Son to Play the Flute	Store Strandstræde	Otto Evens	1859	Source
1892		Tubalcain	Sølvgade	Vilhelm Bissen	1881	Source
1897		The Nile	Søtorvet, Copenhagen	Unknown	1st century AD	Source
1901		The Tiber	Søtorvet, Copenhagen	Unknown		Source
1901		A Drunken Faun	The Lakes	Anders J. Kolberg	1857	Source
1902		Death and the Mother	St. Peter's Church	Niels Hansen Jacobsen	1892	Source
1902		Absalon	Højbro Plads	Vilhelm Bissen	1902	Source
1903		Twilight Approaching	Østre Anlæg	Aron Jerndahl	1902	Source
1910		Valkyria	Churchillparken	Stephan Sinding	1908	Source
1912		The Descendents of Cain	Lyshøj Allé towardsToftegårds Allé	Paul Landowski	1906	Source
1926		City Boundary Post	Strandvejen and Tuborgvej	Jens Lund	1925	Source
1934		Autumn	Poul Henningsens Plads	Jens Lund	1932?	Source
1945		Lying girl	Grønningen	Gerhard Henning:	1932?	[
1949		Death and Resurrection	Vestre Cemetery	Henrik Starcke	1949	Source
1951		Youth	Enghave Park	Einar Utzon-Frank	1833	Source
1956		Cow about to get up	Enghave Park	Mogens Bøggild	1840	Source
1960		Den tingene iboende	Not displayed (originally Thorvaldsen Museum)	Axel Salto	1856	[
1971		Sea Devil	Valby Park Acidophile Garden	Henry Heerup	1970	Source
1979		Cupulate Fruit	Fiolstræde/Dyrkøb	Jean Arp	1960	Source
1988		Bird with Young	Kildevældsparken	Sonja Ferlov Mancoba	1935	Source
1992		Three shapes	Nikolaj Plads	Bent Sørensen	1980s	Source
2002		Pond	Bertel Thorvaldsens Plads	Jørn Larsen	2002	Source

== See also ==
- Ny Carlsberg Glyptotek
