= Nørre Voldgade =

Street in Copenhagen, Denmark

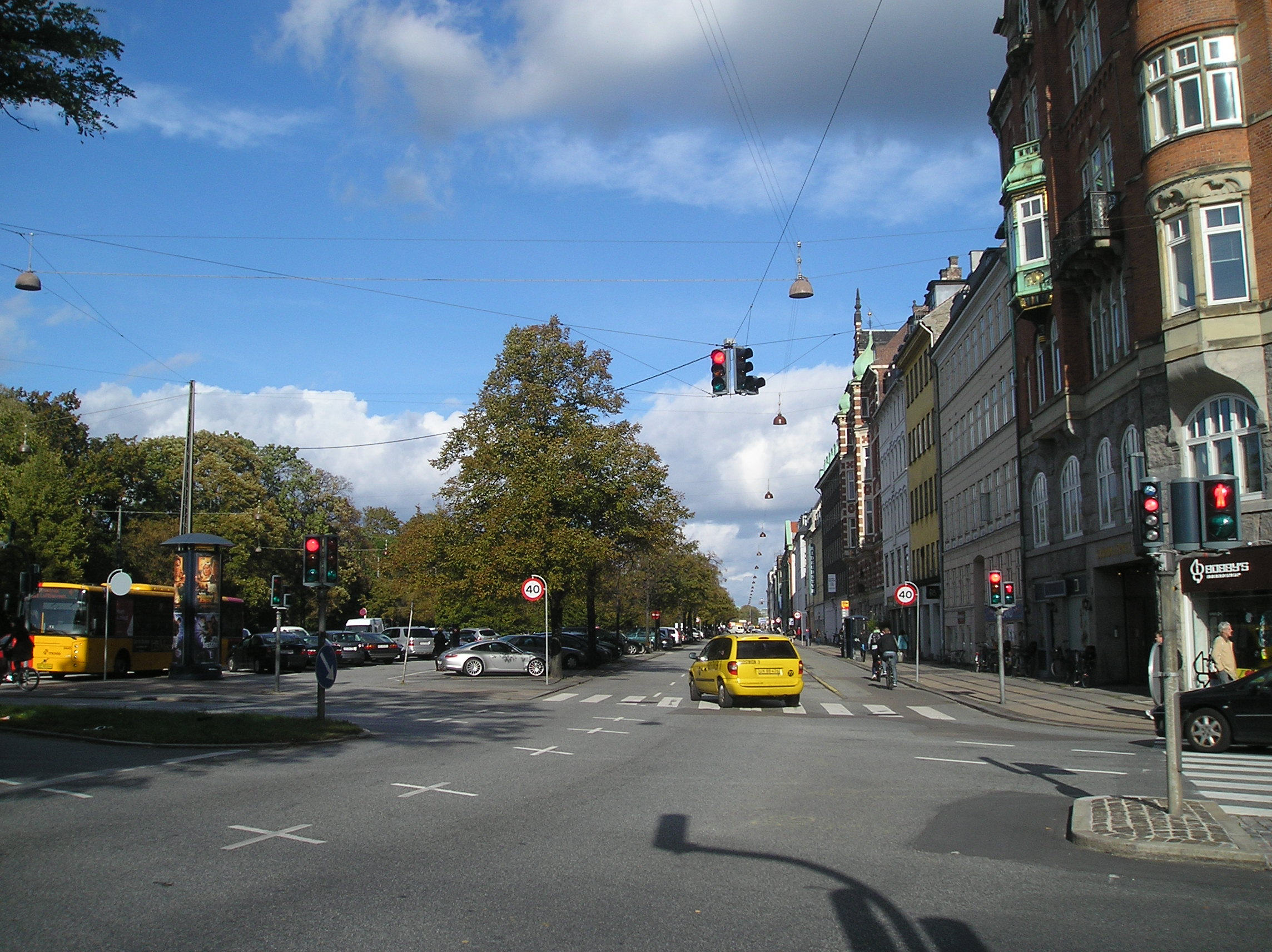
- Nørre Voldgade seen from Jarmers Plads
- Length: 780 m (2,560 ft)
- Location: Copenhagen, Denmark
- Quarter: City centre
- Nearest metro station: Nørreport
- Coordinates: 55°40′55″N 12°34′13″E
- Southwest end: Jarmers Plads
- Northeast end: Gothersgade

Nørre Voldgade (lit. "North Rampart Street") is a street in central Copenhagen, Denmark. It runs north-east from Jarmers Plads for approximately 600 metres to Gothersgade where it turns into Øster Voldgade. The succession of Nørre Voldgade, Øster Voldgade and Vester Voldgade together forms a traffic artery which arches around the Zealand side of the central and oldest part of Copenhagen. Nørreport Station, Denmark's busiest railway station, is located in the street.

== History ==
=== Inside the North Rampart ===
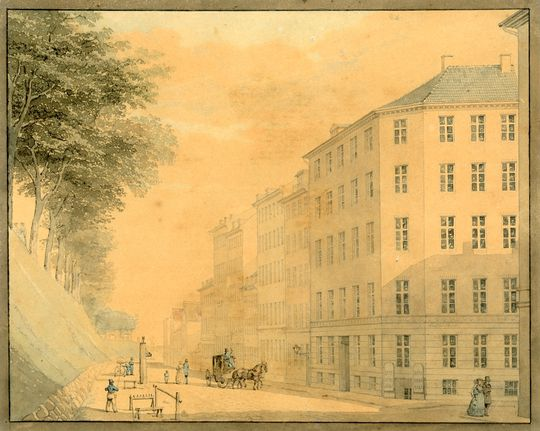
Nørre Voldgade in 1845, painting by H. G. F. Holm

Nørre Voldgade was originally a narrow alley which ran along the city-side margin of the North Rampart in Copenhagen's Bastioned Fortification Ring. The Northn City Gate was first located at Nørregade but moved to Frederiksborggade in 1671. A ropewalk ran along the rampart.

=== North Boulevard ===
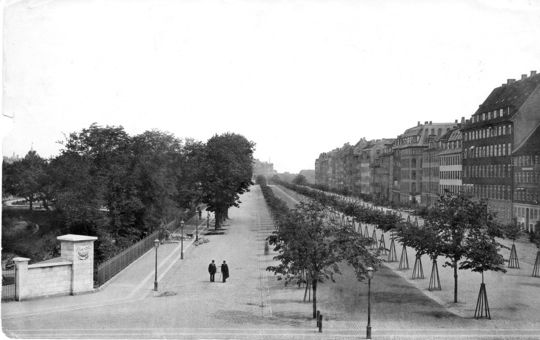
Nørre Voldgade viewed from Jarmers Plads in 1890

The fortifications were decommissioned in 1867. Between 1878 and 1882, the street was expanded and renamed Nørre Boulevard.

=== Later history ===
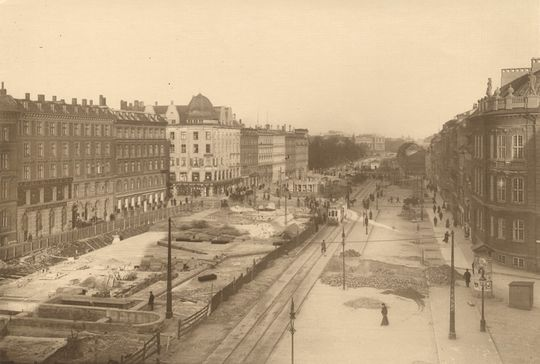
Nørre Voldgade under reconstruction after construction of the Boulevard Line

In 1913, the street was dug up when the excavations for the Boulevard Line began. The line opened in 1917. The original Nørreport station consisted of a round building designed by DSB's head architect Heinrich Wenck on each side of Frederiksborggade. They were demolished in 1932 and replaced by new buildings designed by K.T. Seest.

== Current reconstruction ==
The street is currently undergoing redevelopment in connection with a renovation of Nørreport Station. When the redevelopment is completed in 2014, car traffic will use two lanes on the northern side of the station while the area closest to the city centre will be used for other purposes.

== Notable buildings and residents ==
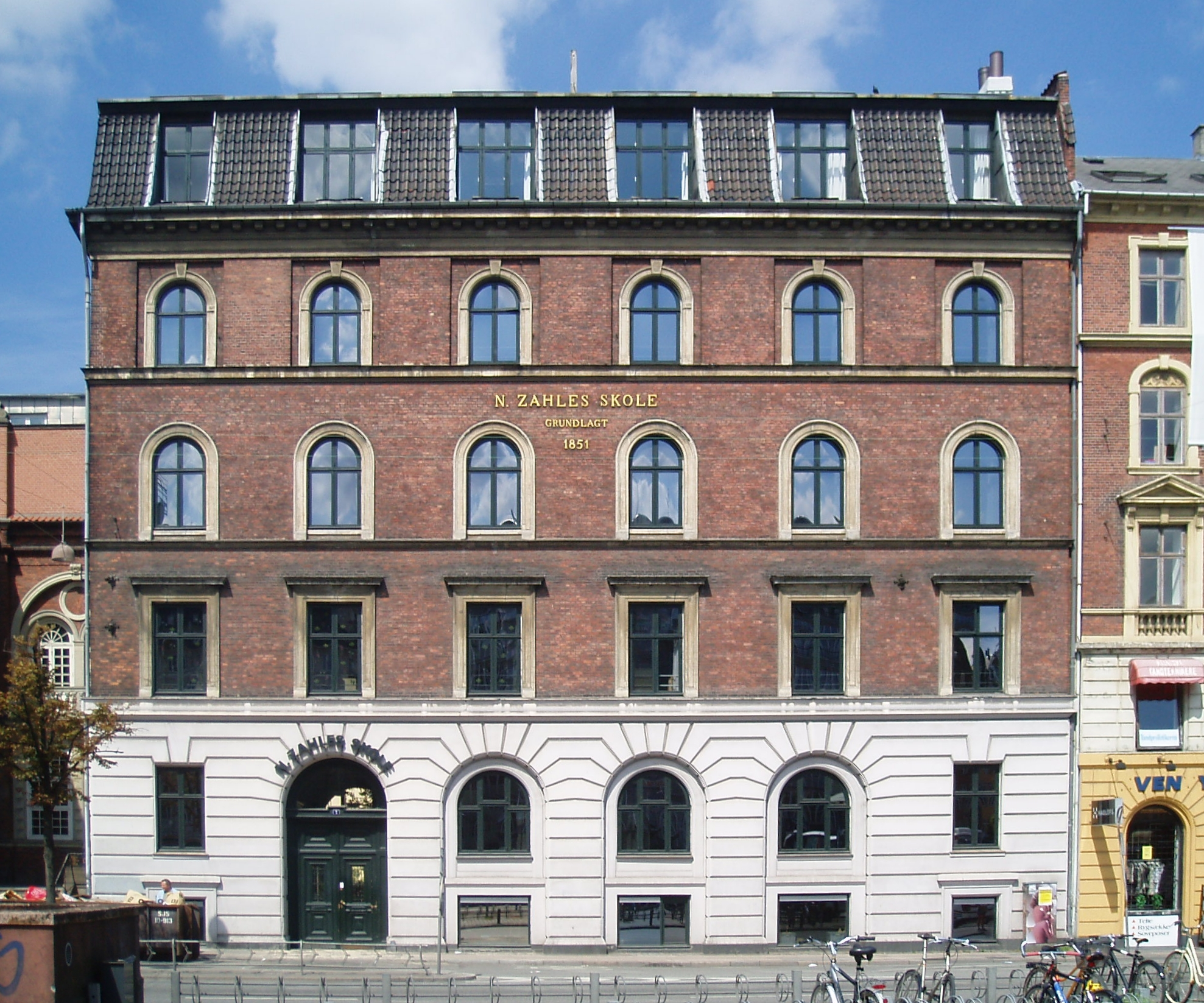
N. Zahle's School

N. Zahle's School was founded by Natalie Zahle in 1851. The primary school (No. 7) was designed by Frederik Bøttger and built in 1877. The neighbouring N. Zahle's Gymnasium (No. 5) was originally an insurance company. It was built in 1875 to a design by Valdemar Ingemann and expanded with an extra floor by Rørbæk & Møller Arkitekter in 2012.

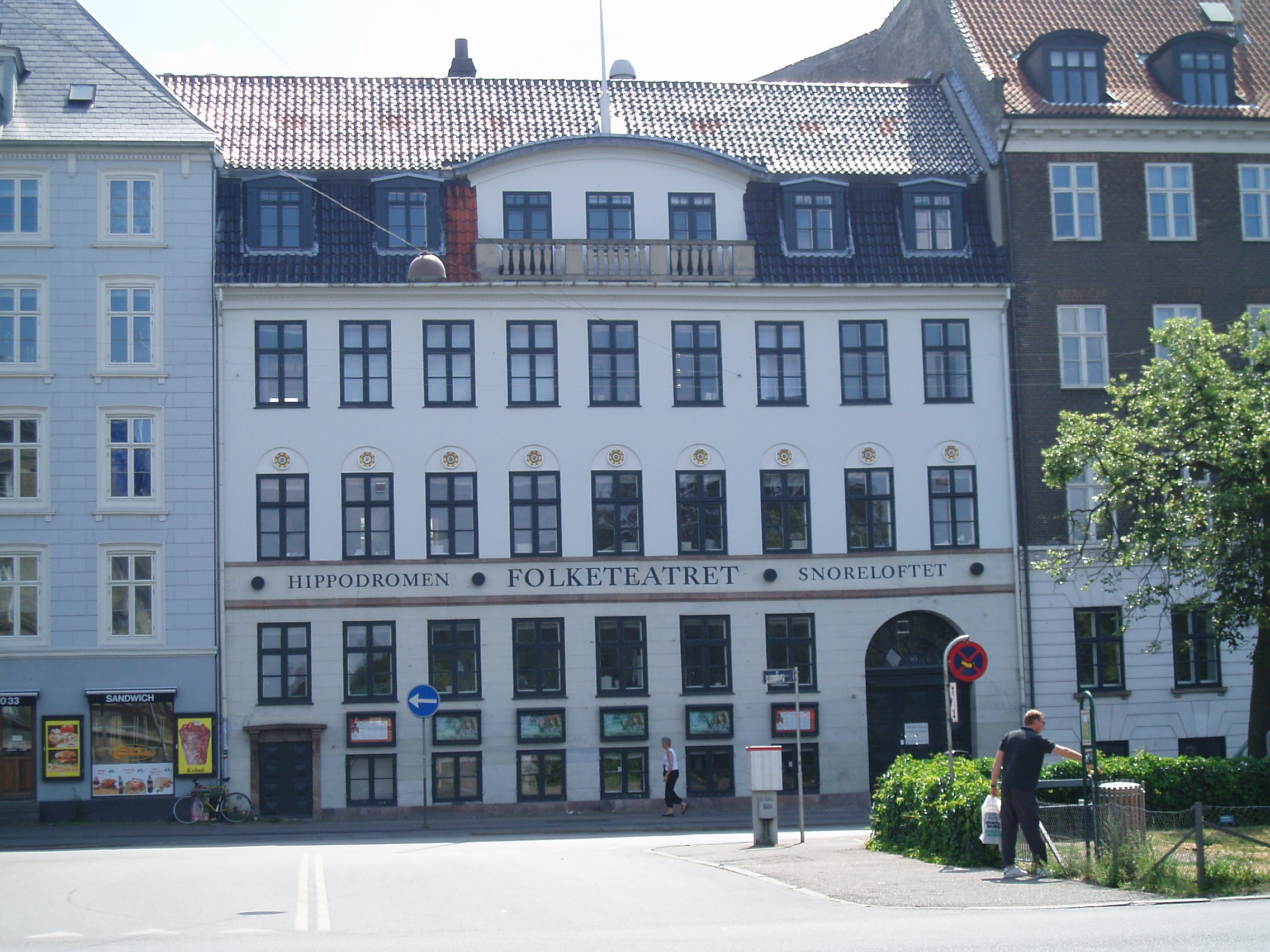
Folketeatret

No. 12 is home to the Danish Union of Professional Technicians (TL). The building is the former headquarters of the glass manufacturer Kastrup Glassworks. It was designed by Phillip Smidth and built between 1892 and 1895. The Iron Manufacturers' House at No. 30 from 1904 was designed by Gotfred Tvede. The building with the rounded corner at No. 32–34 is from 1939 and was designed by Povl Baumann. No. 50 is from 1828 and has since 1900 been part of the theatre Folketeatret whose main entrance is on Nørregade. The headquarters of the DaneAge Association is located at the corner of Nørre Voldgade and Nørregade. The building on the corner of Nørre Voldgade (No. 76) and Fiolstræde is the former Merchants' Academy, now Niels Brock Copenhagen Business College. It was designed by Valdemar and Bernhard Ingemann and opened in 1902.
