= Gyldenløvesgade =

Street in Copenhagen, Denmark

Coordinates: 55.6805°N 12.5619°E

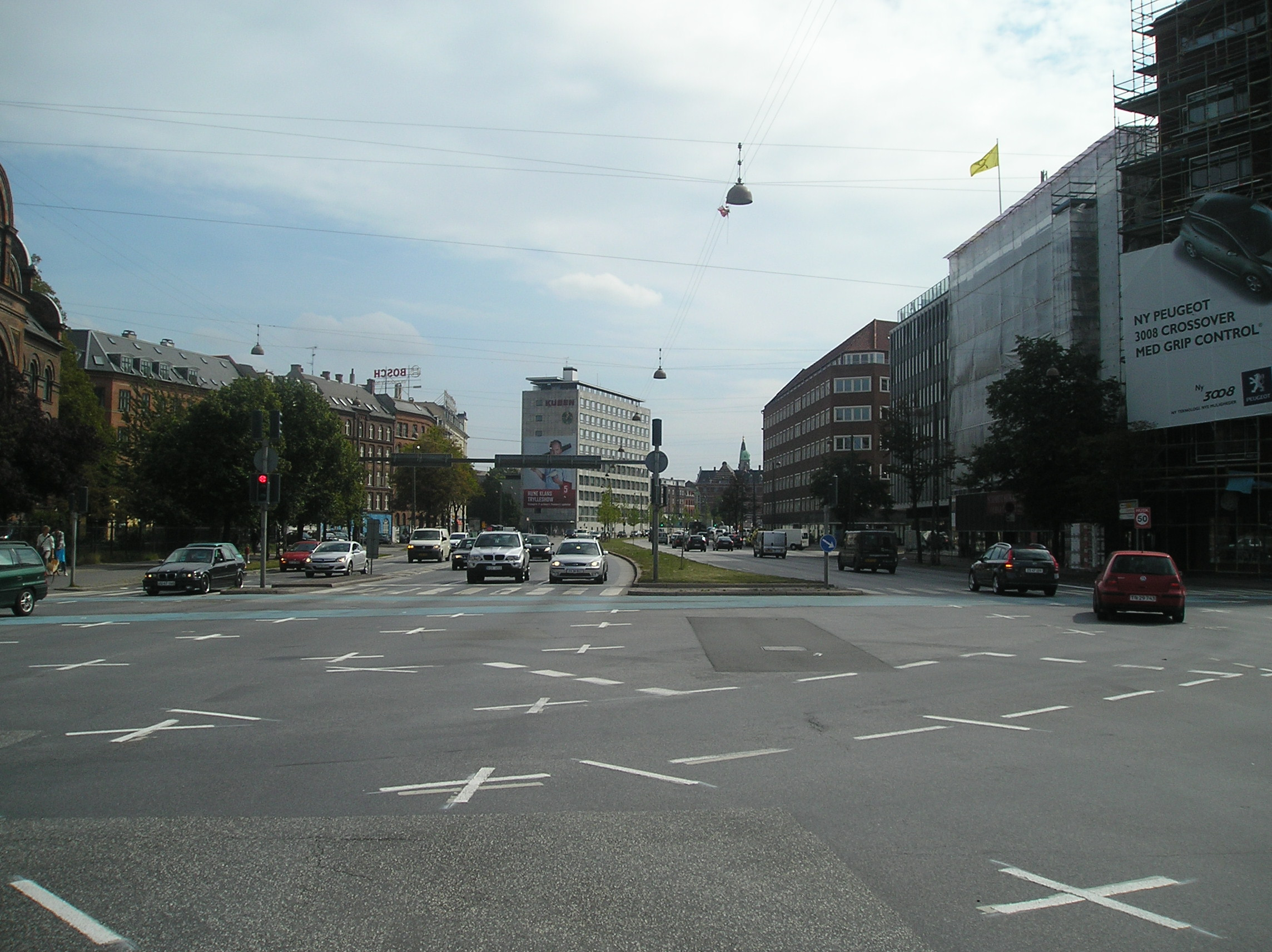
A photo of a street Gyldenløvesgade in Copenhagen.

Gyldenløvesgade is a street in central Copenhagen, Denmark. It runs from Jarmers Plads in the south east to a Y junction at the western side of The Lakes, linking H. C. Andersens Boulevard with Aaboulevarden and Rosenørns Allé. The last section of the street runs on an embankment which separates Peblinge Lake to the north from Sankt Jørgen's Lake to the south. The Lake Pavilion overlooks Peblinge Lake on the north side of the street.

== History ==
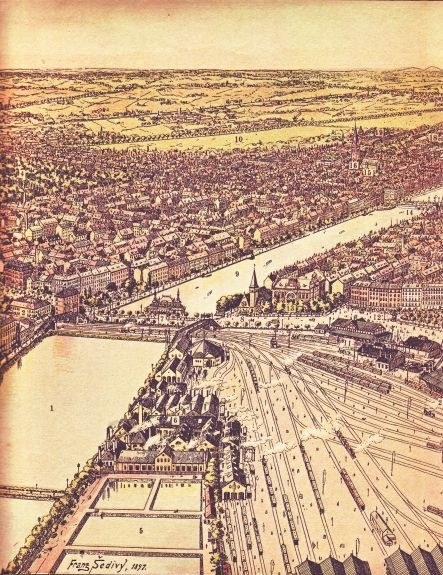
The railway terrain in 1897

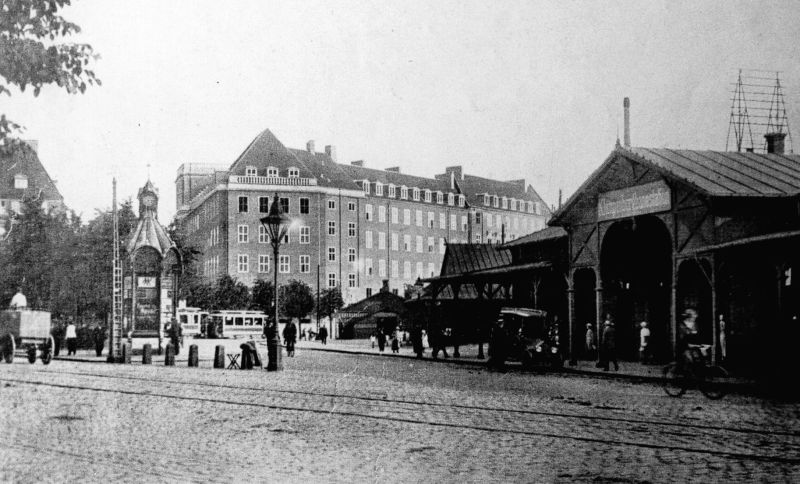
The Klampenborg Station with one of A/S Københavns Telefonkiosker's telephone kiosks

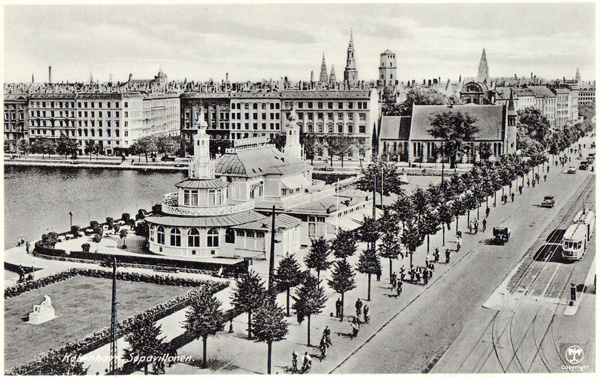
Gyldenløvesgade in c. 1930

Gyldenløvesgade replaced the old Ladegårdsvej to Ladegården. It was proposed in the 1872 Development Plan for the Fortification Ring. It provided a new link between the city centre and the fast-growing Frederiksberg and Nørrebro districts. It received its name after Ulrik Christian Gyldenløve. The railway tracks of the new railway line to Klampenborg opened at the street in 1863. A new Central Station opened next to it in 1864. The railway continued across the embankment between Peblinge Lake and St. Jørgen's Lake. The current Gyldenløvesgade was created when the stations were replaced by the current Copenhagen Central Station in 1911.

Jørn Utzon created a proposal for an indoor swimming venue at the Peblinge Lake in 1979 but it was never realized.

== Notable buildings ==
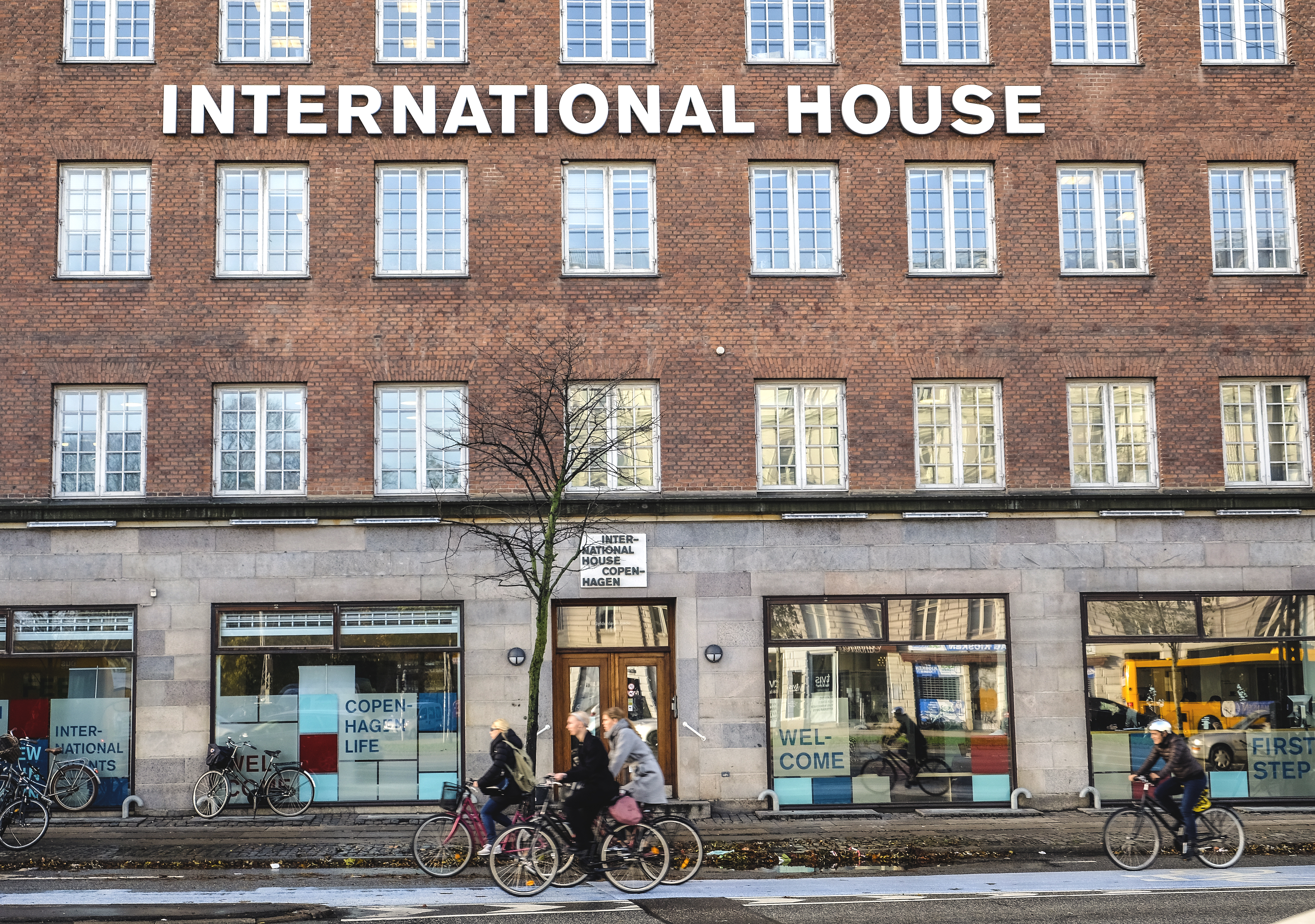
International House

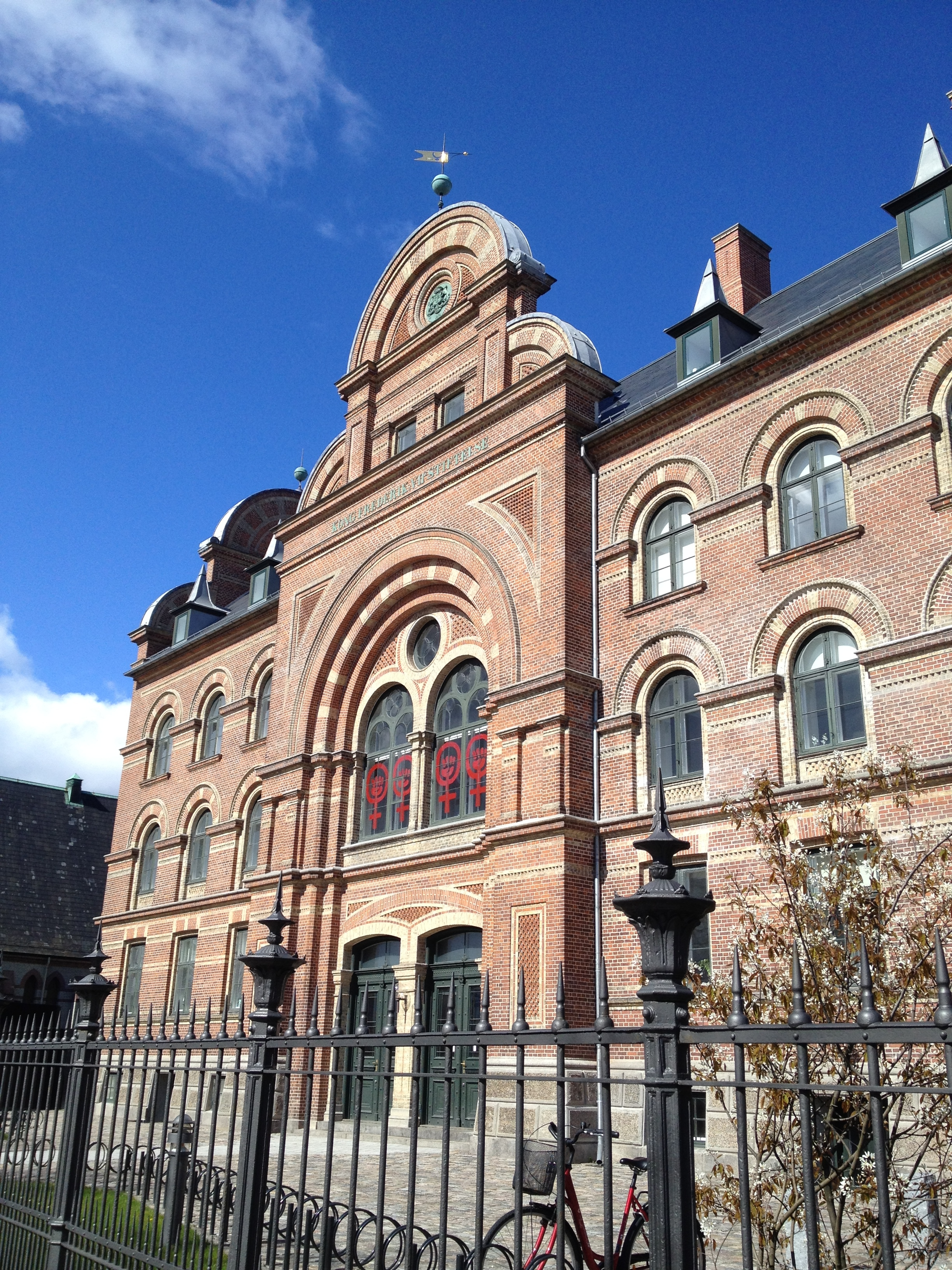
The Danner House

International House (No. 11) is an organisation that assists foreign professionals who settle in Copenhagen. The building was built by Einar Madvig for Den danske Købstadsforenings bygning (later Kommunernes dsforening, now KL) in 1930–31.

The Danner House at the corner with Nansensgade (Nansensgade 1), formerly Frederik VII's Stiftelse, was built in .

It was designed by Ejnar Madvig. The former Catholic Apostolic church at the corner with Nørre Søgade was inaugurated in 1871.

== Public art ==
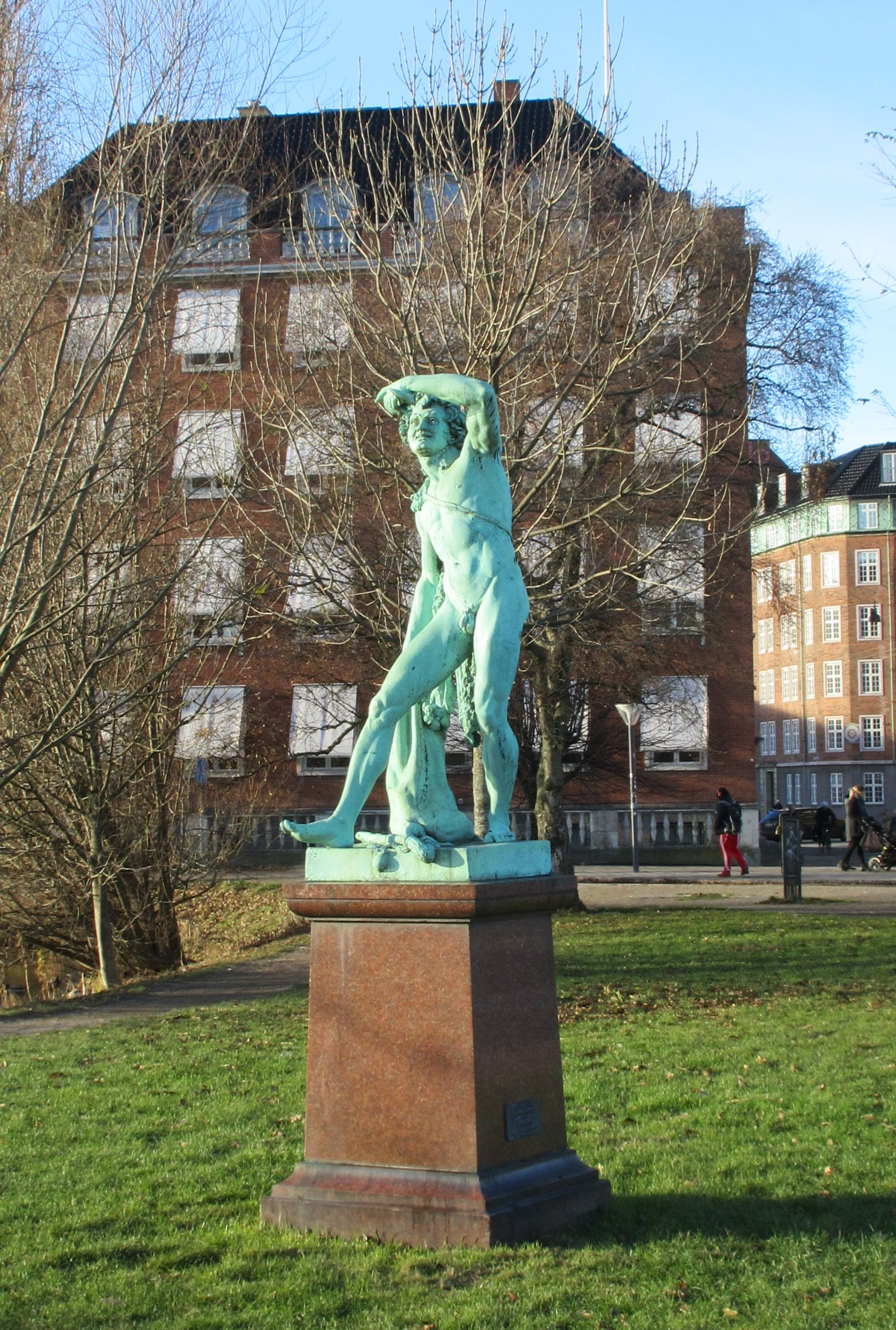
A Drunken Faun

Andreas Kolberg's statue Drunken Faun was installed at the northwestern corner of St. Jørgen's Lake. It was a gift from the Albertina Foundation.

In the garden complex next to the Lake Pavilion are two small fountains which were originally located in Nikolaj Plads but moved to their current location in 1918. It was designed by Martin Nyrop.

A nonfigurative sculpture by the Napolitan sculptor Lydia Cottone, Indagine No. 70, stands at the northeastern corner of St. Jørgen's Lake. It was installed in 2000 to mark the 65-years' anniversary of Zonta International's foundation of the first Zonta Club in Denmark. The sculpture was a gift from Zonta Club Napoli in appreciation of a collection among Copenhagen-based Zonta Clubs for Napolitan women in the 1970s.
