= Nansensgade =

Street in Copenhagen Municipality, Denmark

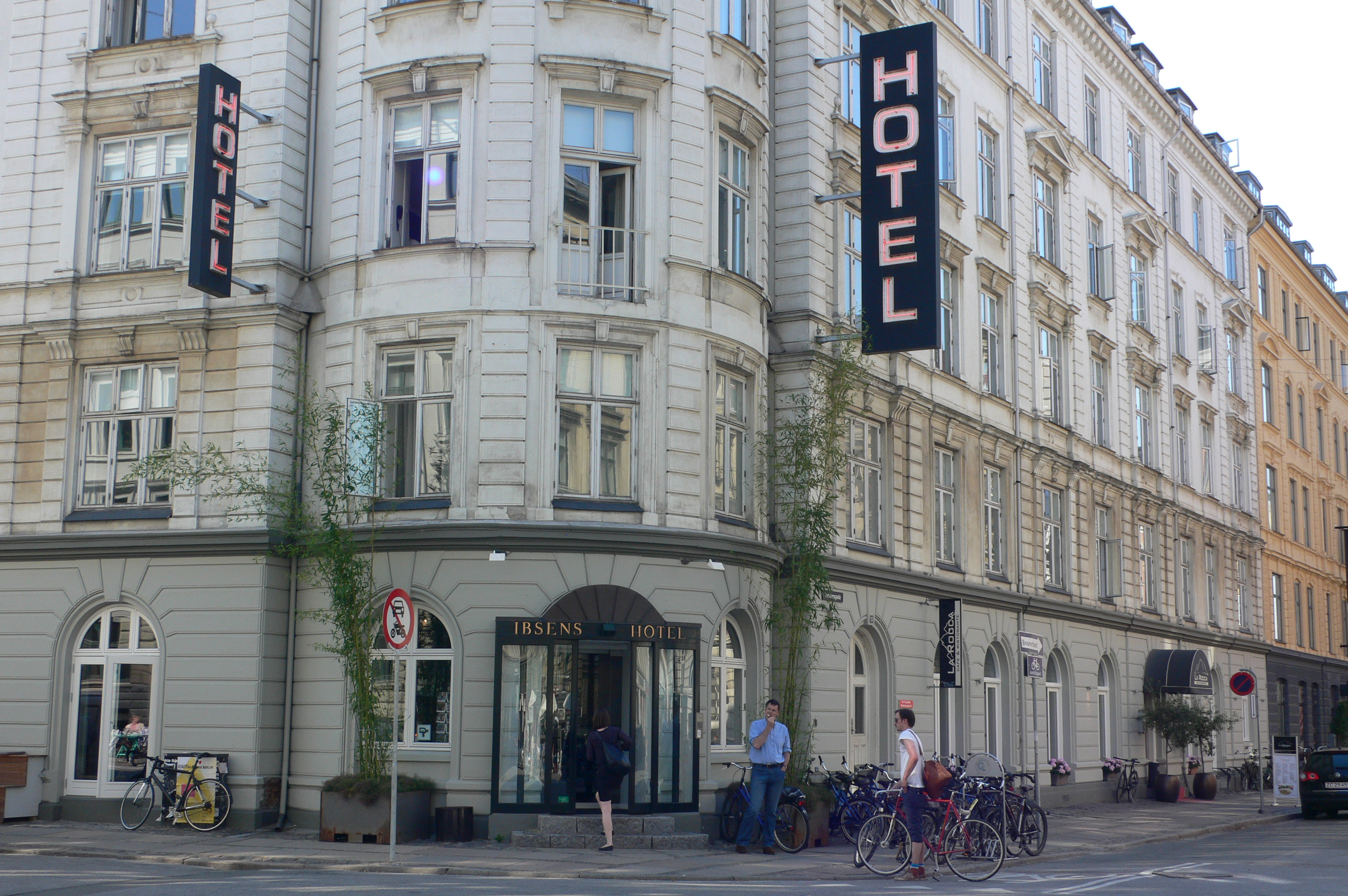
- Ibsens Hotel on the corner of Nansensgade and Vendersgade
- Length: 800 m (2,600 ft)
- Location: Copenhagen, Denmark
- Quarter: City centre
- Nearest metro station: Nørreport
- Coordinates: 55°41′3.12″N 12°33′57.96″E
- Southwest end: Gyldenløvesgade
- Northeast end: Gothersgade

Nansensgade is a street in central Copenhagen, Denmark, linking Gyldenløvesgade in the southwest with Gothersgade in the northeast. The street is known for its abundance of cafés and trendy shops, and plays host to an annual street festival. Charlotte Ammundsens Plads, located in front of the local community centre, is an urban space which connects Nansensgade to Nørre Søgade

== History ==
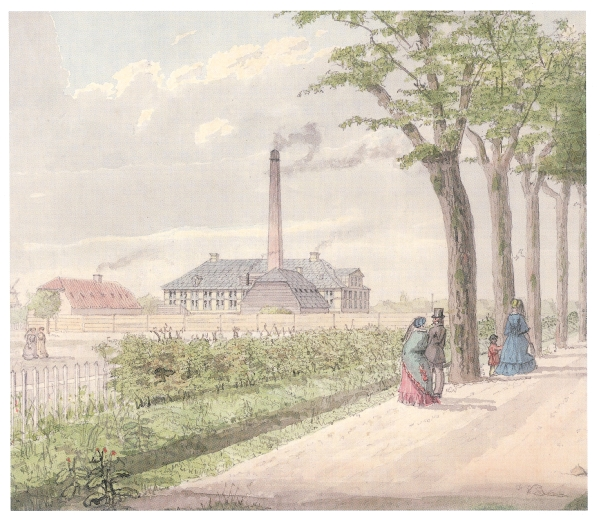
The Elisabethsminde chocolate factory depicted by Heinrich Gustav Ferdinand Holm in 1845

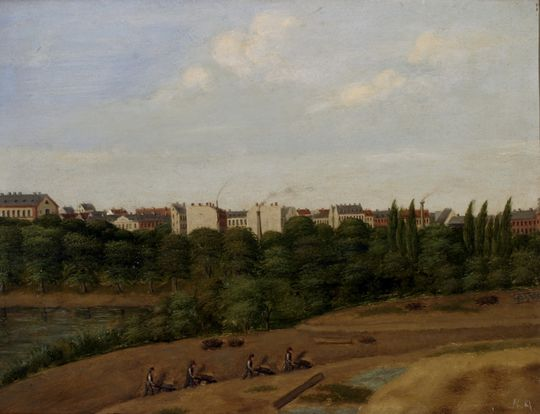
Ørsted Park under establishment with Nansensgade well under way in the background, 1876

Nansensgade is one of several new streets that were created on the former glacis outside the North Rampart after Copenhagen's Bastioned Fortifications were decommissioned. The area was released by the military and purchased by the government in 1864. The new streets in the area was named after people who played a role during the Swedish siege of Copenhagen in the 1650s. The street is named after Hans Nansen, mayor of Copenhagen and a close of king Frederick III.

Nansensgade was completed along with Nørre Søgade, Nørre Farimagsgade in August 1873.

A couple of industrial buildings were older than the street. The Elisabethsminde chocolate factory was situated in the area between Nansensgade and the Peblinge Lake. It later relocated to Heimdalsgade in Nørrebro in 1914.

== Notable buildings and residents ==
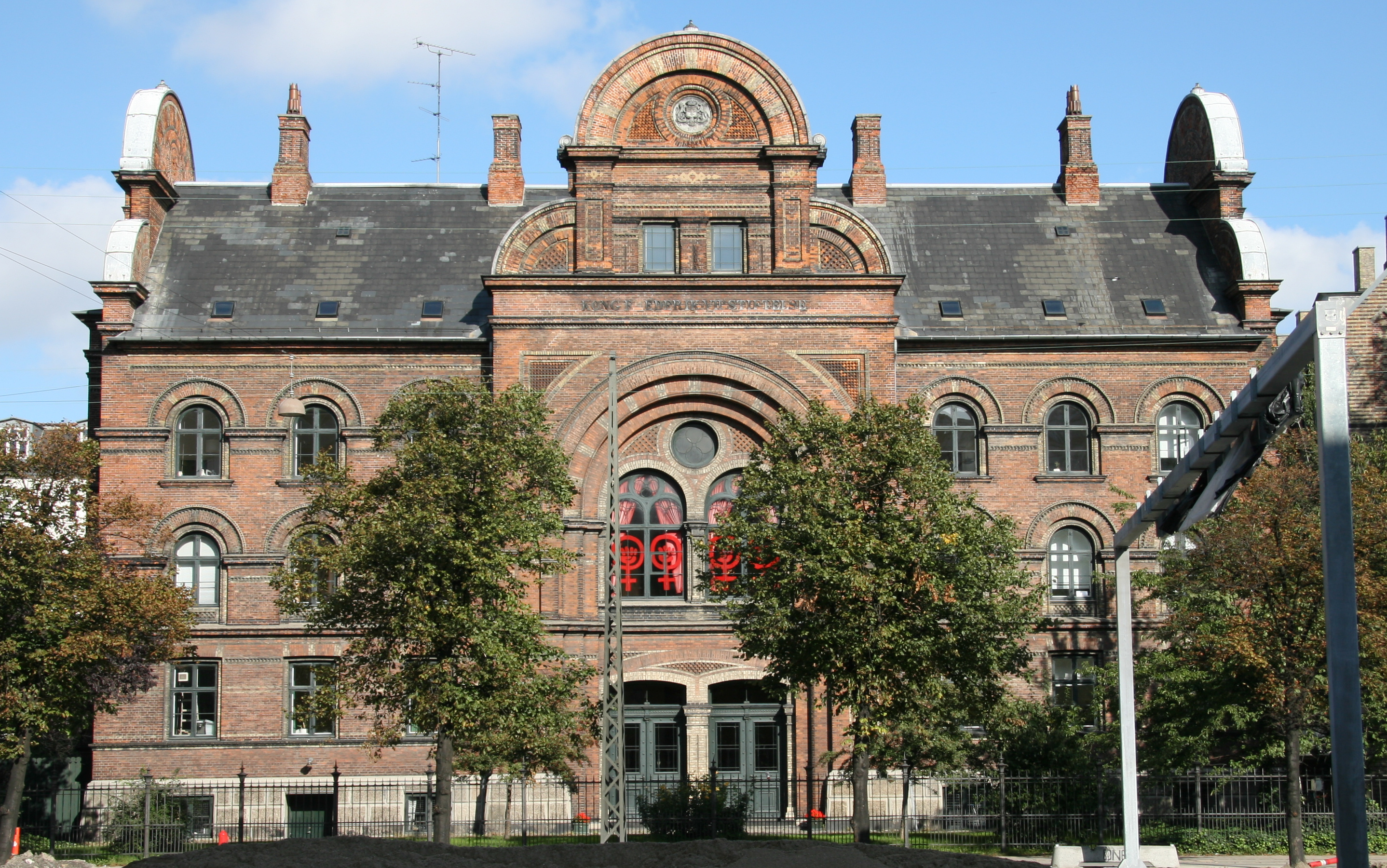
Danner House

Nansensgade School (No. 44–46) was designed by Niels Sigfred Nebelong and opened in 1870. The Danner House was founded by Countess Danner and is now a support centre for women. The building was designed by Theodor Zeltner and completed in 1875.

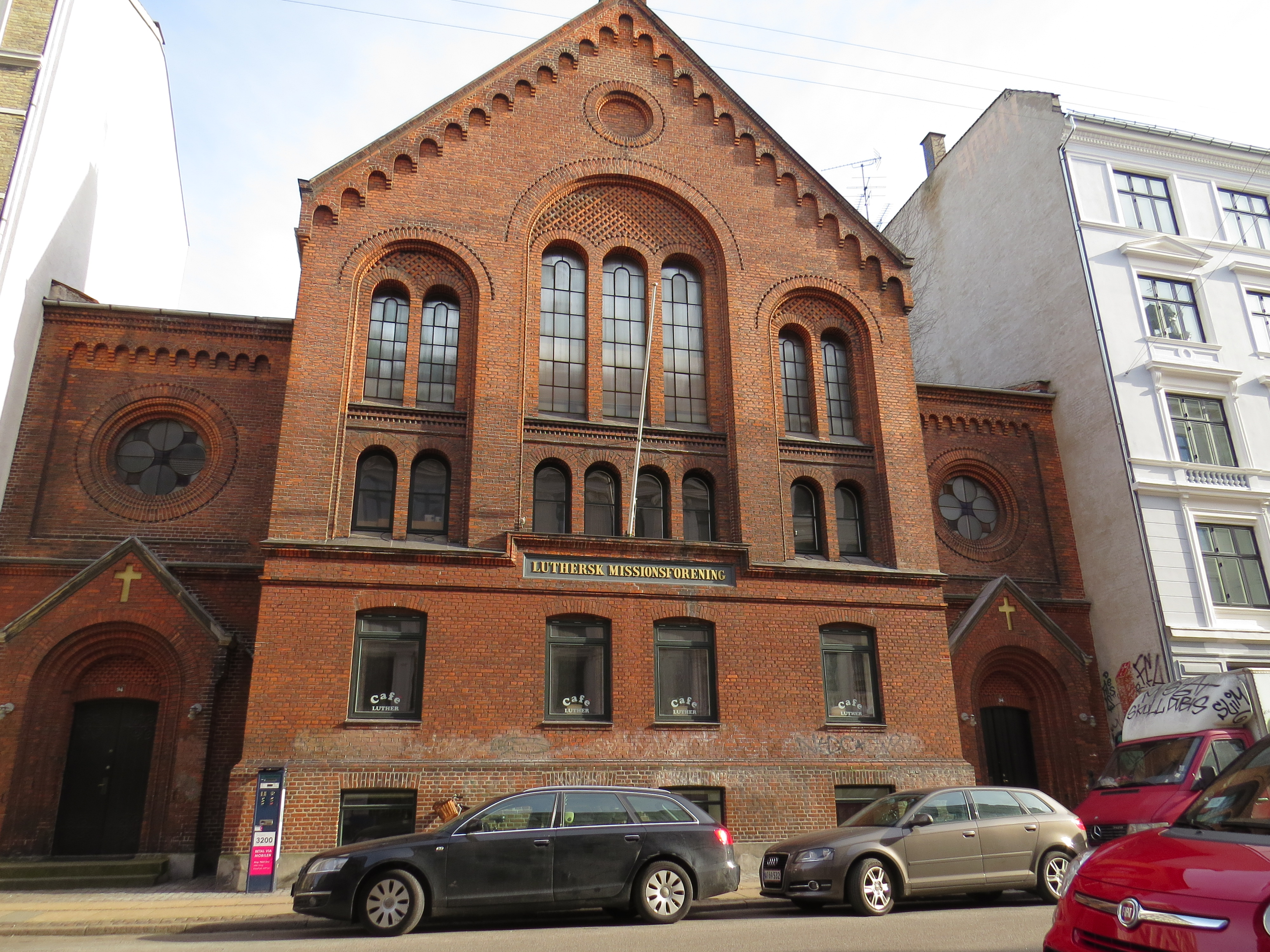
No. 23: Danish Lutheran Mission

Ibsens Hotel is located at No. 23. The Lutheran Mission House (No. 94) was built for Danish Lutheran Mission in 1895 to a design by Valdemar Ingemann.

== Public art ==
Mogens Heide's sculpture Chicken Feet and Bjørn Nørgaard's sculpture Borne were installed in the street in 1983.
