= The Story of a Mother =

- Short story by Hans Christian Andersen
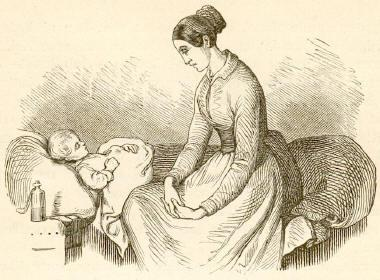
- Vilhelm Pedersen illustration.
- Original title: Historien om en moder
- Country: Denmark
- Language: Danish
- Genre: Fairy tale

Publication
- Publication date: December 1847

The Story of a Mother (Danish: Historien om en moder) is a tale by the Danish poet, travel writer, fairy tale writer, and novelist Hans Christian Andersen (1805-1875). The tale was first published in December 1847, and has been adapted for the stage and screen multiple times.

== Summary ==
During winter, a mother is tending to her sick child when Death comes to her house as an old man begging for food and shelter which the woman provides. For three days and three nights, the mother doesn't sleep as she looks after her child whose cradle Death gently rocks. When the exhausted mother sleeps, Death takes her child away.

The mother wakes up and begins searching for her child. She meets Night in the form a black-dressed woman who reveals the old man's identity to her. In exchange for directions, the mothers sings lullabies to Night who tells her to go into the woods.

At a crossroad in the woods, a blackthorn bush requests to be warmed by the mother's heart. After the mother lets her skin be pricked and pierced by the thorns, the blackthorn bush blossoms and tells her which path to take.

The mother arrives at a lake, but there are no boats for her to ride and the ice is too thin for her to cross. In exchange for the mother's eyeballs, the lake brings her to Death's greenhouse.

The now blind mother is greeted by the old white-haired woman who tends to Death's greenhouse. The old woman reveals that every plant inside Death's greenhouse is a person's soul which he transplants when they die; the old woman also instructs the mother to listen carefully for her child's heartbeat in exchange for her long black hair. Given the old woman's white hair in return, the blind mother finds her child's soul in the form a small blue crocus.

When Death shows up, the mother threatens to uproot other flowers, but backs down when Death warns her she will break other parents' hearts. Death gives the mother her eyes back and commands her to look into a well. In the water, she sees the futures of two children: one is happy and loved while the other is miserable and in despair. Death explains that both futures are the will of his master, God, and one of the two destinies is her own child's.

Rather than allow her child to suffer longer, the mother prays to God as she lets Death bring her child's soul to the afterlife.

== In popular culture ==
=== Films ===
- Historien om en moder (1949), a Danish film directed by Max Louw.
- Historien om en moder (1963), a Danish film directed by Erik Kirchner, Erik Mortensen and Jørgen Thoms.
- "Ganbare mama (Don't Give Up, Mother)" (1971), an episode of the Japanese anime series Andersen Monogatari, directed by Masami Hata.
- Historien om en moder (1977), a Danish stop-motion animation film directed by Jørgen Vestergaard.
- The Story of a Mother (1979), a Danish film directed by Claus Weeke.
- Death and the Mother (1997), an English silent animated short film adaptation directed by Ruth Lingford.
- Historia de una madre (2003), a Mexican film directed by Erik Mariñelarena.
- Historien om en mor (2005), a Danish TV movie directed by Svend Ploug Johansen.
- The Story of a Mother (2010). an Italian short film produced and directed by Alessandro De Vivo and Ivano di Natale.

=== Comics ===
- The Story of a Mother (2004), a Danish graphic novel by Peter Madsen.

=== Music ===
- "Die Geschichte einer Mutter" (1992), a song by Norwegian band Bel Canto from their 1992 album Shimmering, Warm and Bright.
- American metal band Revocation made a song, "Cradle Robber", from their 2011 album Chaos of Forms, which is inspired by the story.
- "Mater Dolorosa" (1934), an opera in four tableaux by Daniel Sternefeld.
- "The Mother" (1961), an opera in one act by Stanley Hollingsworth.

=== Art ===
- Death and the Mother

== See also ==
- The Garden of Death, Finnish artist Hugo Simberg's 1896 painting which depicts Death as three skeletal gardeners tending to flowers that symbolise mortal souls.
