= Death and the Mother =

Sculpture by Niels Hansen Jacobsen

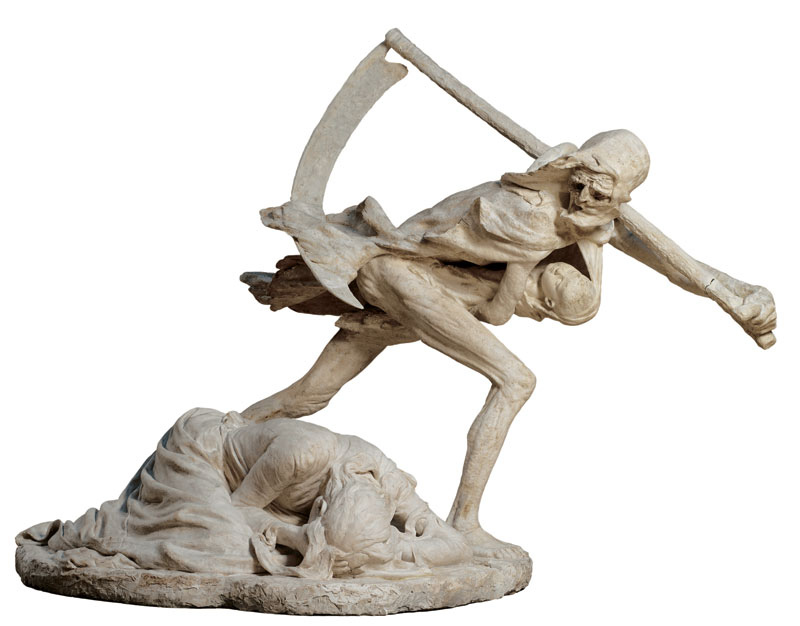
- Artist: Niels Hansen Jacobsen
- Year: 1892
- Type: plaster
- Dimensions: 152 cm × 134 cm × 199 cm (60 in × 53 in × 78 in)
- Location: Danish National Gallery

Death and the Mother (Danish: Døden og moderen) is a sculpture created by the Danish sculptor Niels Hansen Jacobsen. Inspired by Hans Christian Andersen's tale The Story of a Mother, it depicts a Grim Reaper figure, in a dynamic pose, carrying a scythe and a dead child, striding over a mother crouching on the ground. The original plaster model is in the holdings of the Danish National Gallery while two bronze castings are located outside St. Peter's Church in Copenhagen and Vejen Art Museum.

== History ==
Hansen Jacobsen created the original plaster model in 1892, shortly after he had settled in Paris where he lived until 1901. His newly wedded wife Gabriela served as model for the mother crouching on the ground. The literary inspiration for the work was Hans Christian Andersen's tale The Story of a Mother. When the sculpture was exhibited at Charlottenborg in 1894, the catalogue contained a slightly modified version of the last sentence of the tale: "And she lowered her head into her lap. And Death took her child into the Unknown Lands".

The model was first exhibited at the Société Nationale des Beaux-Arts in Paris where it was well received. The next year it was exhibited at Charlottenborg and in 1899 Hansen Jacobsen gave the model to the Danish National Gallery.

== Casts ==
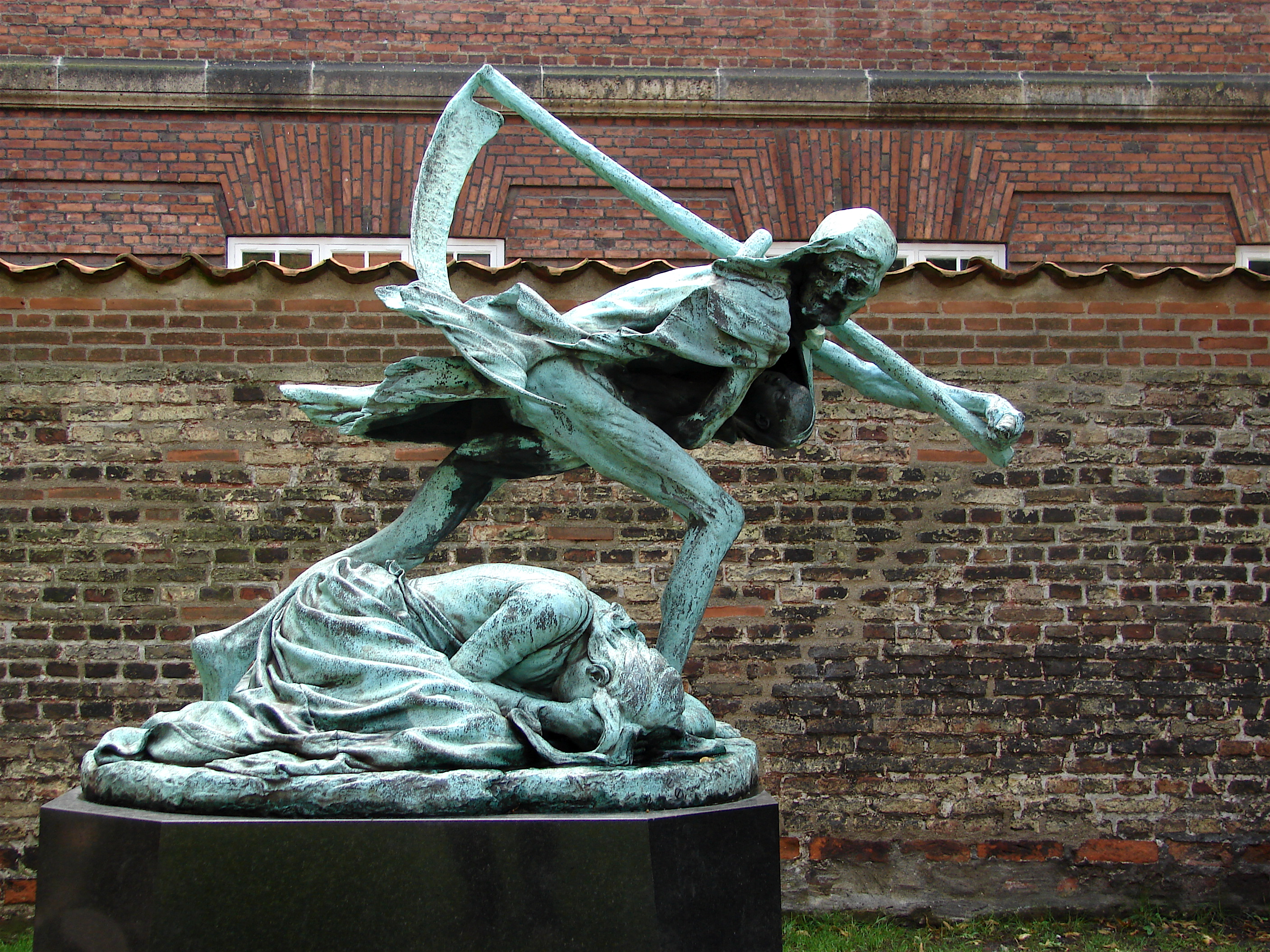
The cast at St. Peter's graveyard

After his return to Denmark in 1901, Hansen Jacobsen received a commission from Carl Jacobsen's Albertina Foundation for a bronze cast which was installed in front of Church of the Holy Ghost in Copenhagen. In 1966 it had to be moved because the ward found it "profoundly depressing" and it was instead placed outside St. Peter's Church.

Another cast was later placed outside Vejen Art Museum which had been opened to house his oeuvre.

== Description ==
The portrayal of Death as the Grim Reaper was frequently seen in other artworks of the time, such as in paintings by Jean-François Millet and the Danish painter L. A. Ring.

Death and the Mother is also the same title of English director Ruth Lingford's 1997 animated short film adaptation of Andersen's tale.

== See also ==
- Mermaid (Carl-Nielsen)
