= The Story of a Mother (2010 film) =

- Theatrical release poster
- Directed by: Alessandro De Vivo; Ivano di Natale
- Screenplay by: Alessandro De Vivo; Ivano di Natale
- Story by: Hans Christian Andersen
- Produced by: Alessandro De Vivo; Ivano di Natale
- Starring: Nino Colella; Angela de Matteo Renato De Rienzo
- Cinematography: Antonio De Rosa
- Edited by: Alessandro De Vivo; Ivano di Natale
- Music by: Federico Truzzi
- Distributed by: Fablemakers
- Release date: May 5, 2010 (United States)
- Running time: 18 minutes
- Country: Italy
- Language: Italian
- Budget: $15,000

The Story of a Mother (2010) is an Italian short film produced and directed by Alessandro De Vivo and Ivano di Natale. The drama features Nino Colella, Angela de Matteo and Renato De Rienzo. It is an adaptation of the Hans Christian Andersen short story of the same name.

== Plot ==
One night, Death (voice of Renato de Rienzo) swoops in and takes the life of a child. His mother (Angela de Matteo) will do anything to recover him, even lose all she has.

== Cast ==
- Nino Colella as Guardian of the Forest
- Angela de Matteo as Mother
- Renato De Rienzo as Death and voice f. c.
- Valeria Frallicciardi as Woman
- Nunzia Schiano as Greenhouse Keeper

== Exhibition ==
The film opened at the New York City Horror Film Festival on May 5, 2010.

== Film Festivals ==
- New York City Horror Film Festival - 2010
- Hollywood Reel Independent Film Festival - 2010
- Newport Beach Film Festival - 2011
- Minghella Film Festival - 2011
- Boston International Film Festival - 2011
- Fantasy Horror Award - 2011
- Dances With Films - 2011
- I've Seen Films International Film Festival - 2011
- Napoli Film Festival - 2011
- 41° Parallelo - New York City - 2011
- Riverside International Film Festival 2012

== Awards ==
Wins

- Roma Fantafestival, Best Short, 2012
- California Film Awards, Silver Award, 2012

== See also ==
- Hans Christian Andersen
- The Story of a Mother
