= DaneAge Association =

Danish nonprofit membership organization

- Formation: 1986
- Headquarters: Copenhagen, Denmark
- Chief Executive: Bjarne Hastrup
- Website: Official website

The DaneAge Association (Danish: Ældre Sagen) is a Danish nonprofit membership organization that works for the protection of senior citizens' interests in the society. It was founded in 1986 and has about 650,000 members (2013).

== Organisation ==
DaneAge has 217 local chapters across Denmark. Some 14,000 volunteers do voluntary social work, arrange local membership activities, local advocacy, etc.

== Headquarters ==
The association's headquarters is located on the corner of Nørre Voldgade and Nørregade in central Copenhagen. It maintains a staff of about 100. The artist Bjørn Nørgaard has decorated the interior of the building. He has also designed a proposed glass dome which will create a new public space with views of the city centre. The plans were announced in 2013.

== Magazine ==
Dane Age publishes the magazine Ældre Sagen Nu six times a year. It claims to be read by one third of all Danes aged 50+, placing it in the top three of all Danish magazines.
