= Kildevældsparken =

Small park in Copenhagen, Denmark

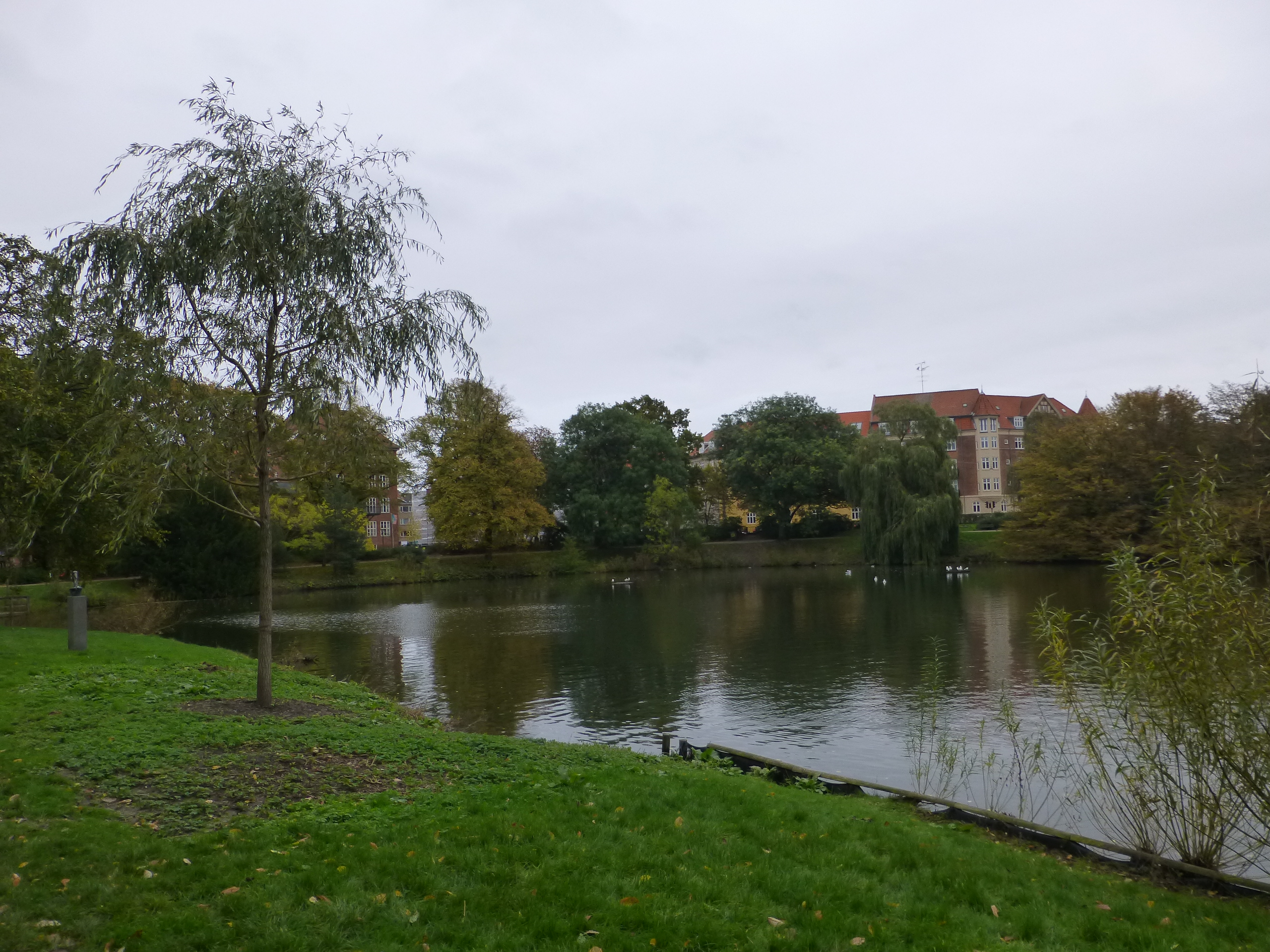
- Kildevæld Park with its lake
- Interactive map of Kildevældsparken
- Type: Urban park
- Location: Copenhagen, Denmark
- Coordinates: 55°42′52″N 12°34′01″E
- Area: 0.77 hectares (1.9 acres)
- Created: 1927

Kildevældsparken is a small park in the outer Østerbro district of Copenhagen, Denmark. It is bounded by Vognmandsmarken/Bellmansgade and Borgervænget. It has an area of 0.77 hectares and contains a lake.

== History ==
The lake was created as a result of extraction of gravel and clay for the construction of the Freeport in the 1880s. The park was established in 1926–27. It takes its name after a former country house and restaurant which was located at the corner of Østerbrogade Kildevældsgade. The park was protected in 1977.

== See also ==
- Kildevæld Church
