= Auguste Cain =

French sculptor

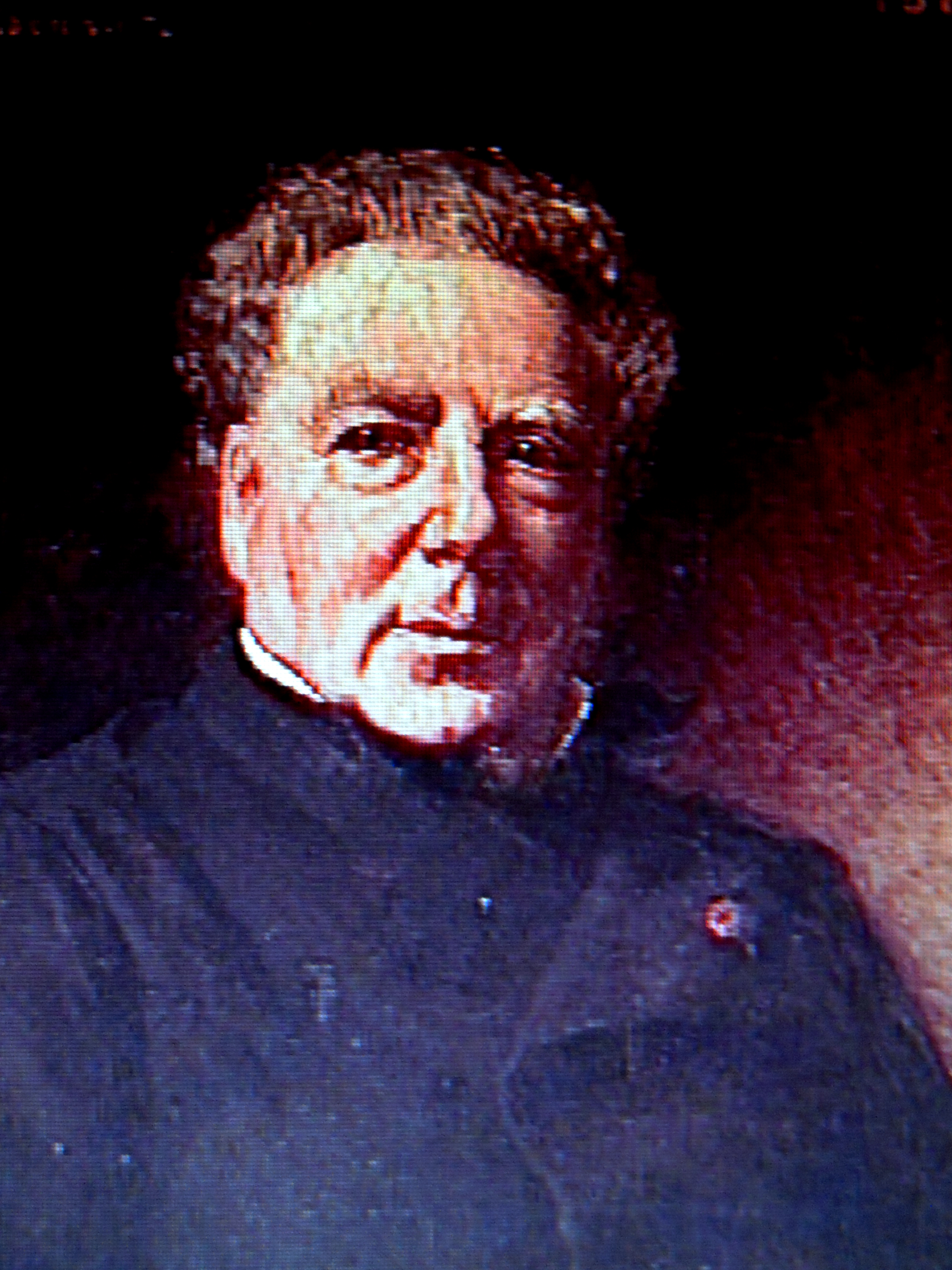
Portrait of Auguste Cain by Léon Bonnat (detail)

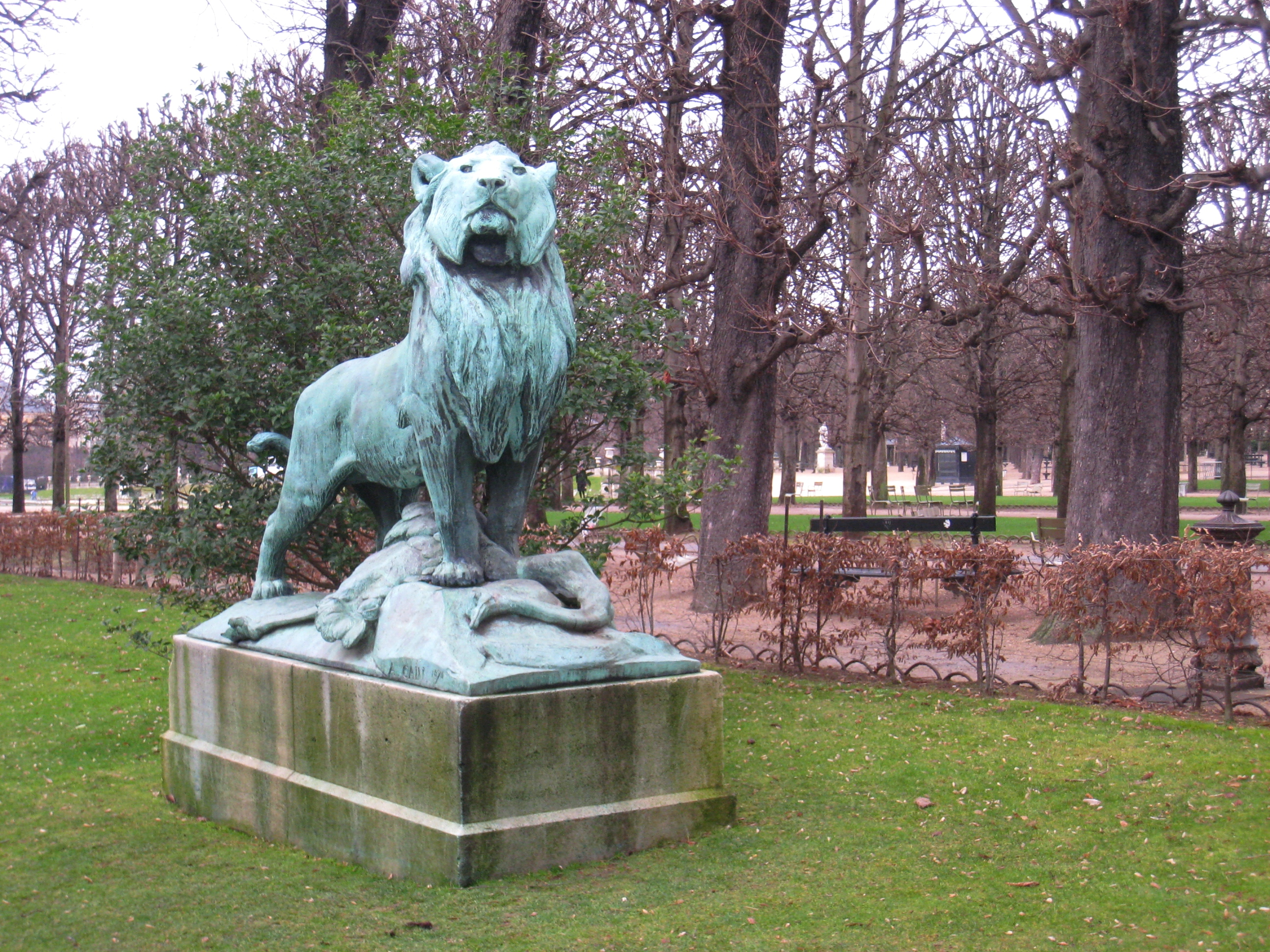
Le Lion de Nubie et sa Proie, by Auguste Cain (Jardin du Luxembourg)

Auguste Nicolas Caïn (10 November 1821 – 6 August 1894) was a French sculptor in the Animaliers school, known for his portrayals of wild and domesticated animals.

== Life ==
Caïn was born in Paris, and studied under Rude, Guionnet, and Pierre-Jules Mêne (whose daughter he married in 1852). His first exhibit in the Salon of 1846 was a wax model of a linnet defending her nest from a rat, later cast in bronze and shown at the 1855 Salon. Between 1846 and 1888, Caïn exhibited 38 models at the Salon.

From 1868 onwards he concentrated on monuments, including the Chiens de meute at the Château de Chantilly, Le Lion de Nubie et sa proie in the Jardin du Luxembourg, and Tigress and Peacock in the Gardens of the Tuileries. In 1879 he assumed management of his father-in-law's foundry upon Mêne's death.

Henri Caïn, a well known librettist, and Georges Cain, the painter, were his sons.

== Selected works ==
- Tigre terrassant un crocodile, bronze (1873), jardin des Tuileries.
- Lion et lionne se disputant un sanglier, bronze, jardin des Tuileries. Another copy was installed at Jarmers Plads in Copenhagen in 1889.
- Deux lionnes attaquant un taureau, bronze, 1882, jardin des Tuileries
- Tigresse apportant un paon à ses petits, bronze (1873), jardin des Tuileries (Copy, perhaps original in Central Park, New York City, with donor's copy in Kelvingrove Park, Glasgow).
- Lionnes du Sahara, bronze (1867), deux exemplaires qui ornent la Porte des lions coté Nord de l'aile de Flore, le coté Sud arbore lui les Lions assis de Barye.
- La Tigresse Furieuse, bronze (1863) cadeau au Préfet de Tlemcen ... Algerie (1866)
- Le Lion de Nubie et sa proie, bronze (1870), jardin du Luxembourg.

== Photos ==
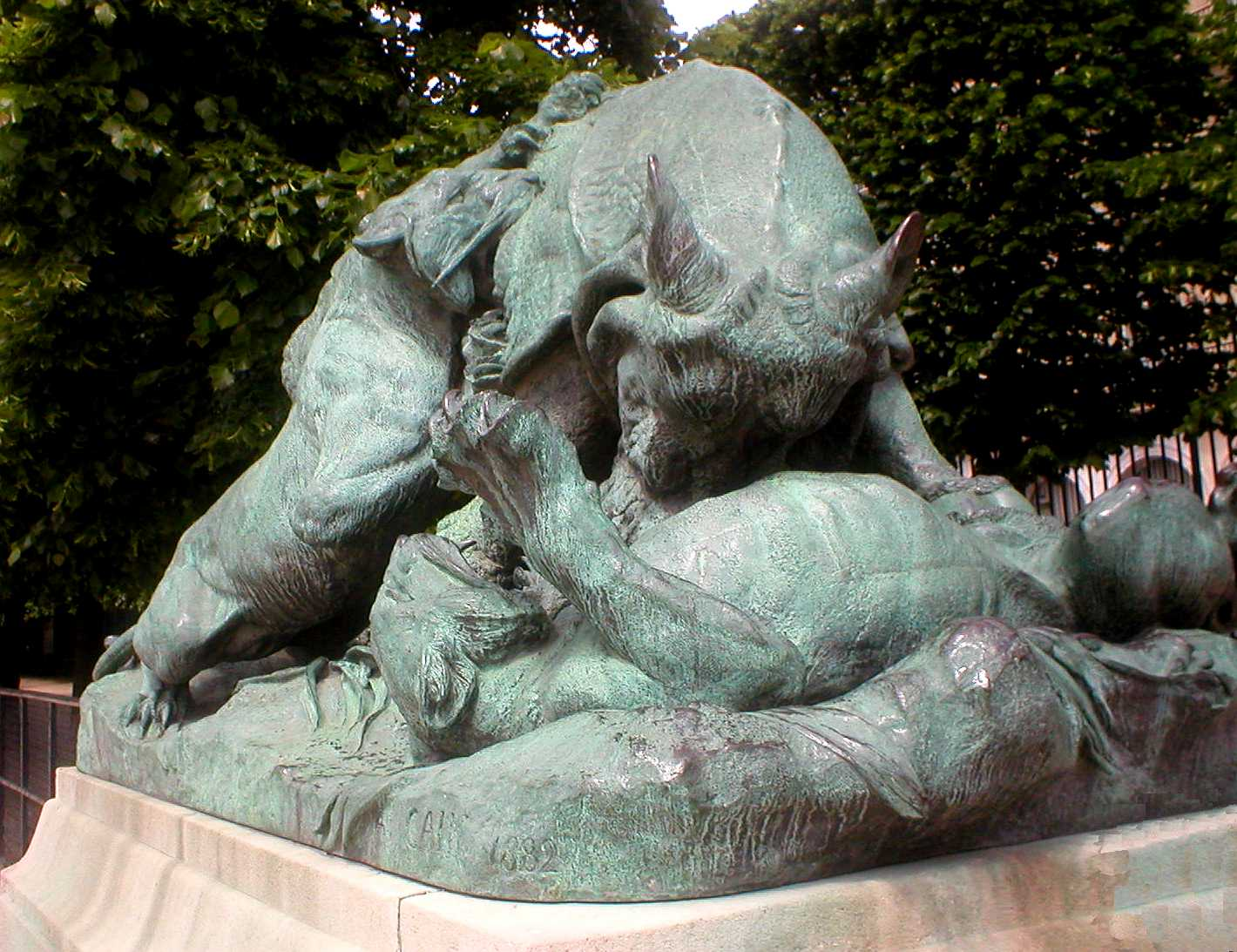
Deux lionnes attaquant un Taureau

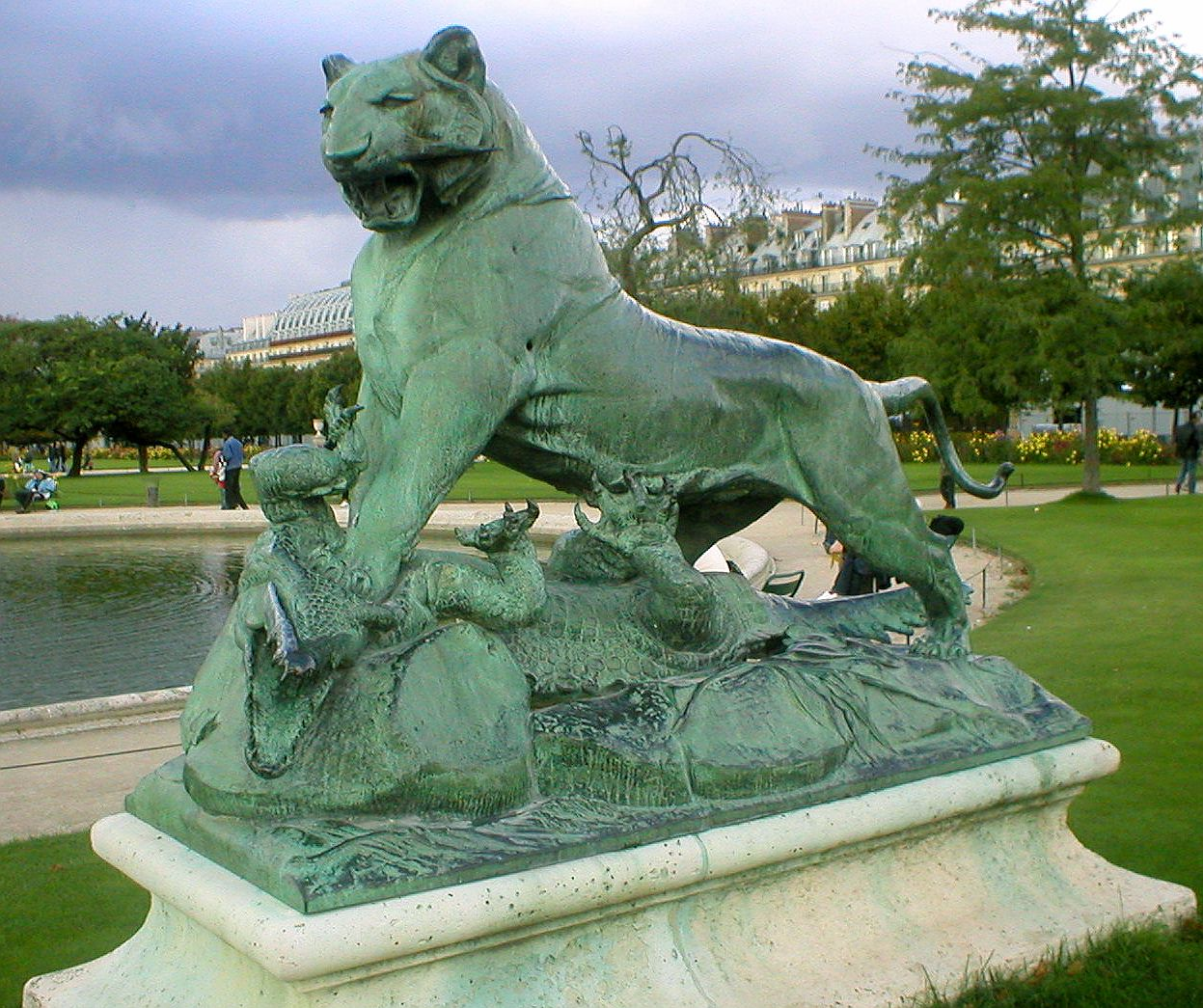
Tigre terrassant un crocodile

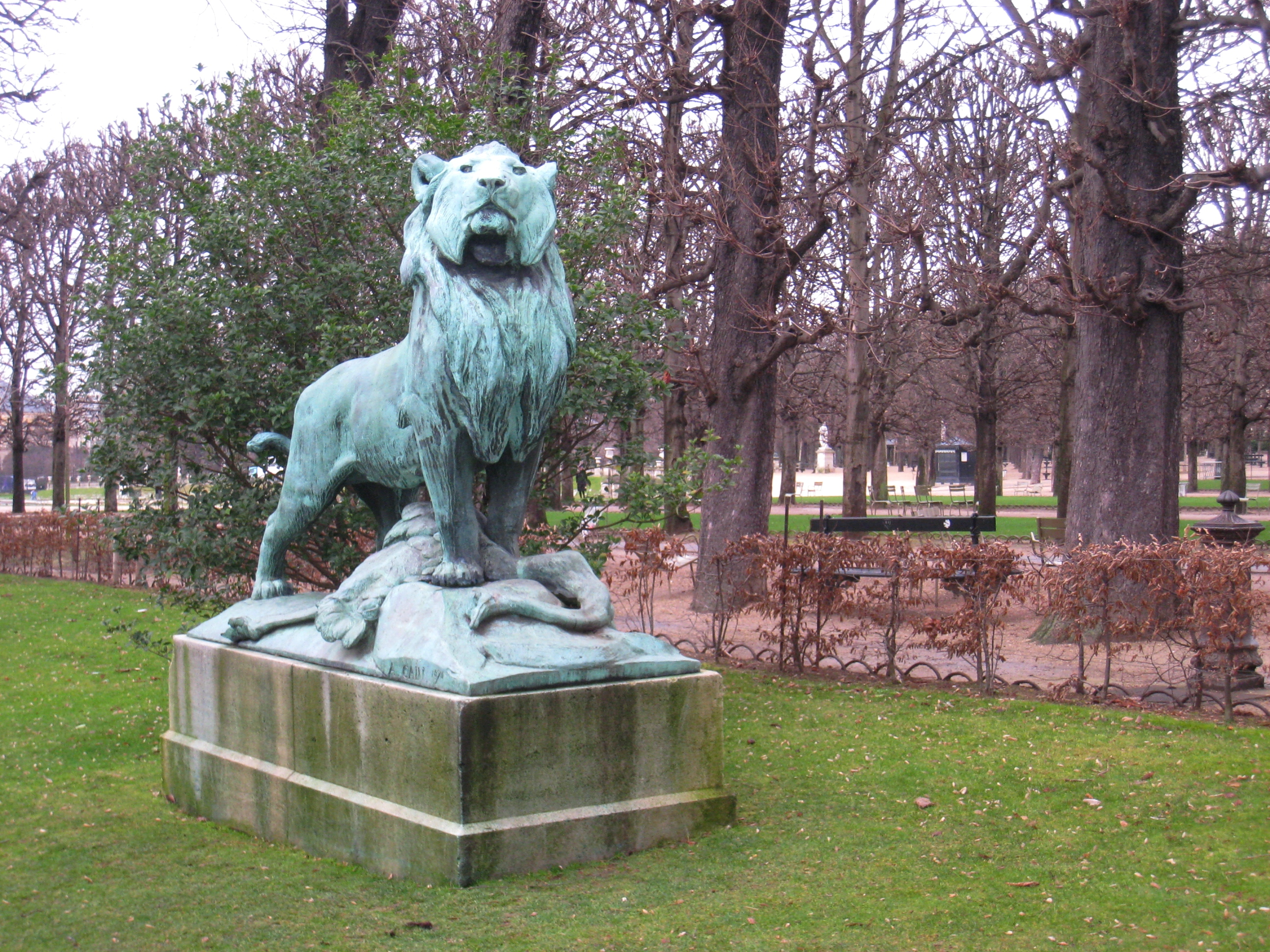
Le Lion de Nubie et sa Proie

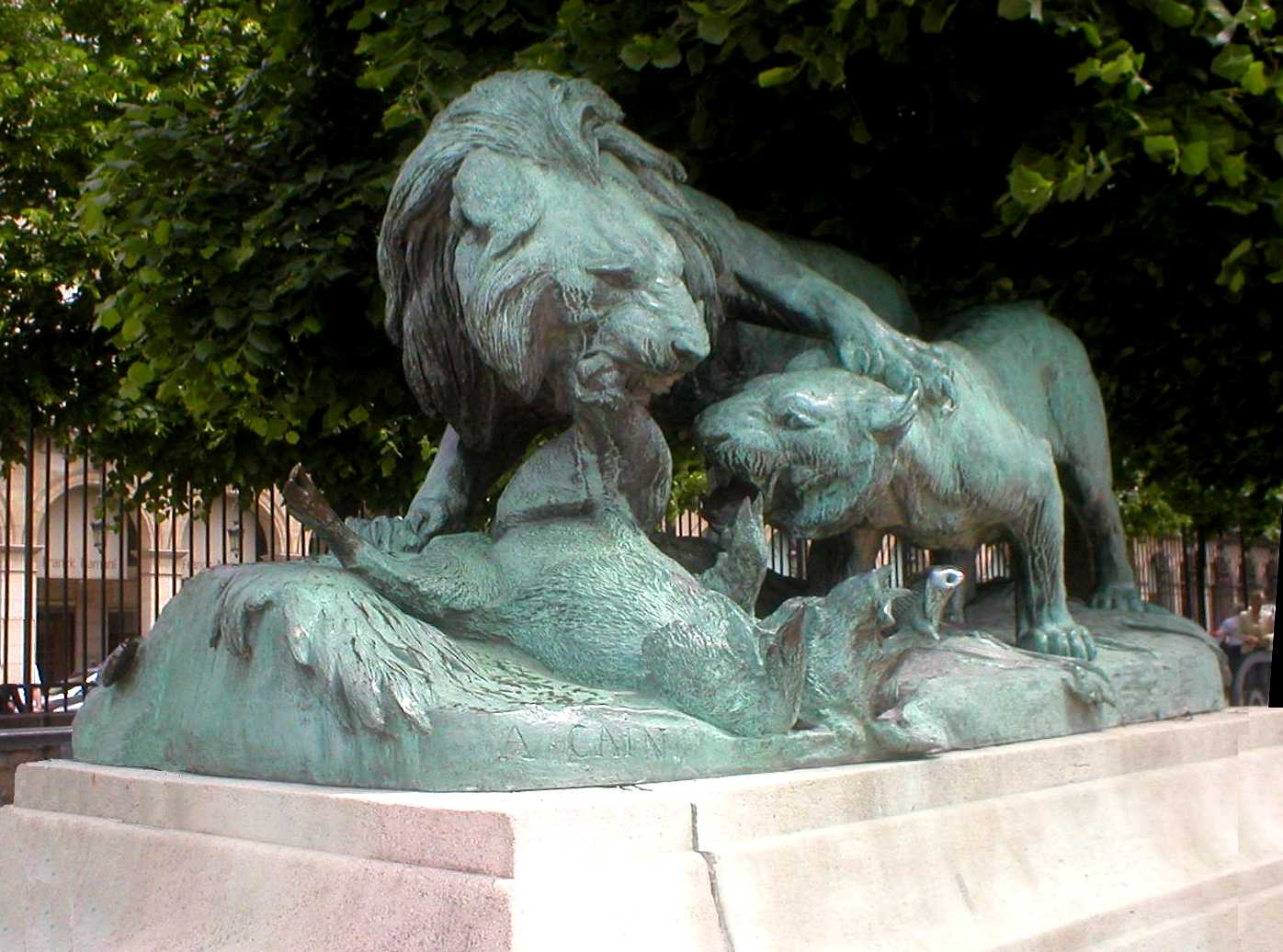
Lion et Sanglier

== Literature ==
- Les Animaliers, Jane Horsell, 1971.
- The Animaliers, James Mackay, 1973.
- Animals in Bronze, Christopher Payne, 1986.
- Bronzes of the 19th Century, Pierre Kjellberg, 1994.
- A Concise History of Bronzes, George Savage, 1968.
- Dictionnaire des Peintres et Sculpteurs, E. Benezit, 1966.)
- Dictionnaire de Sculpteurs de l'ecole Francaise, Stanaslas Lami, 1914.
