= Jørn Larsen =

Danish painter and sculptor (1926–2004)

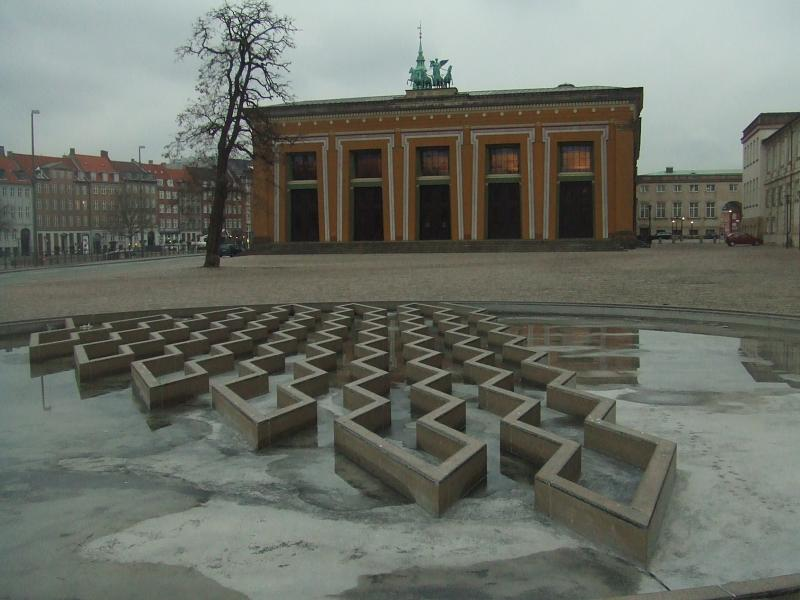
Jørn Larsen's water feature outside Thorvaldsens Museum

Jørn Larsen (15 December 1926 – 13 June 2004) was a Danish painter and sculptor. He was a member of Grønningen from 1970 and received the Eckersberg Medal in 1978 and the Thorvaldsen Medal in 1989. He represented Denmark at the Venice Biennale in 1993.

== Biography ==
Jørn Larsen was born in Næstved in 1926. He first apprenticed as a house painter in his home town but in 1948 moved to Copenhagen where he attended drawing classes. He was admitted to the Royal Danish Academy of Fine Arts in 1951 but left after completing just one semester to go to Italy. Over the next couple of years he travelled abundantly in Europe, spending his time mainly in France, Spain, Greece and Turkey.

In 1955 he made his first non-figurative pictures and had his debut with them at the Kunstnernes Efterårsudstilling (autumn exhibition) in Copenhagen. A stay in eastern Greenland during 1959 and 1960 inspired him to paint a series of pictures known as the Kutdleq Suite after his return home.

From 1962 he developed a black-and-white geometrical style and created both objects and sculptures in various materials, including marble, granite and steel. In 1970 he became a member of the artists group Grønningen.

== Works ==
Jørn Larsen's works include a steel sculpture for Odense University (1974–76) and floor decorations for the Royal Danish Theatre (1992). He also designed the water feature at Bertel Thorvaldsens Plads in Copenhagen.

Other decorative works are found at Roskilde Hospital (1988), Udlejre Church (1996), Silkeborg Bad (1994) and Jelling Church (1999).

== Awards ==
- 1977 La Mention Speciale du Jury, 9me Festival International de la Peinture, Cagnes-sur-Mer, France
- 1978 Eckersberg Medal
- 1989 Thorvaldsen Medal
