= Bertel Thorvaldsens Plads =

Square in Copenhagen, Denmark

Coordinates: 55.6763°N 12.5773°E

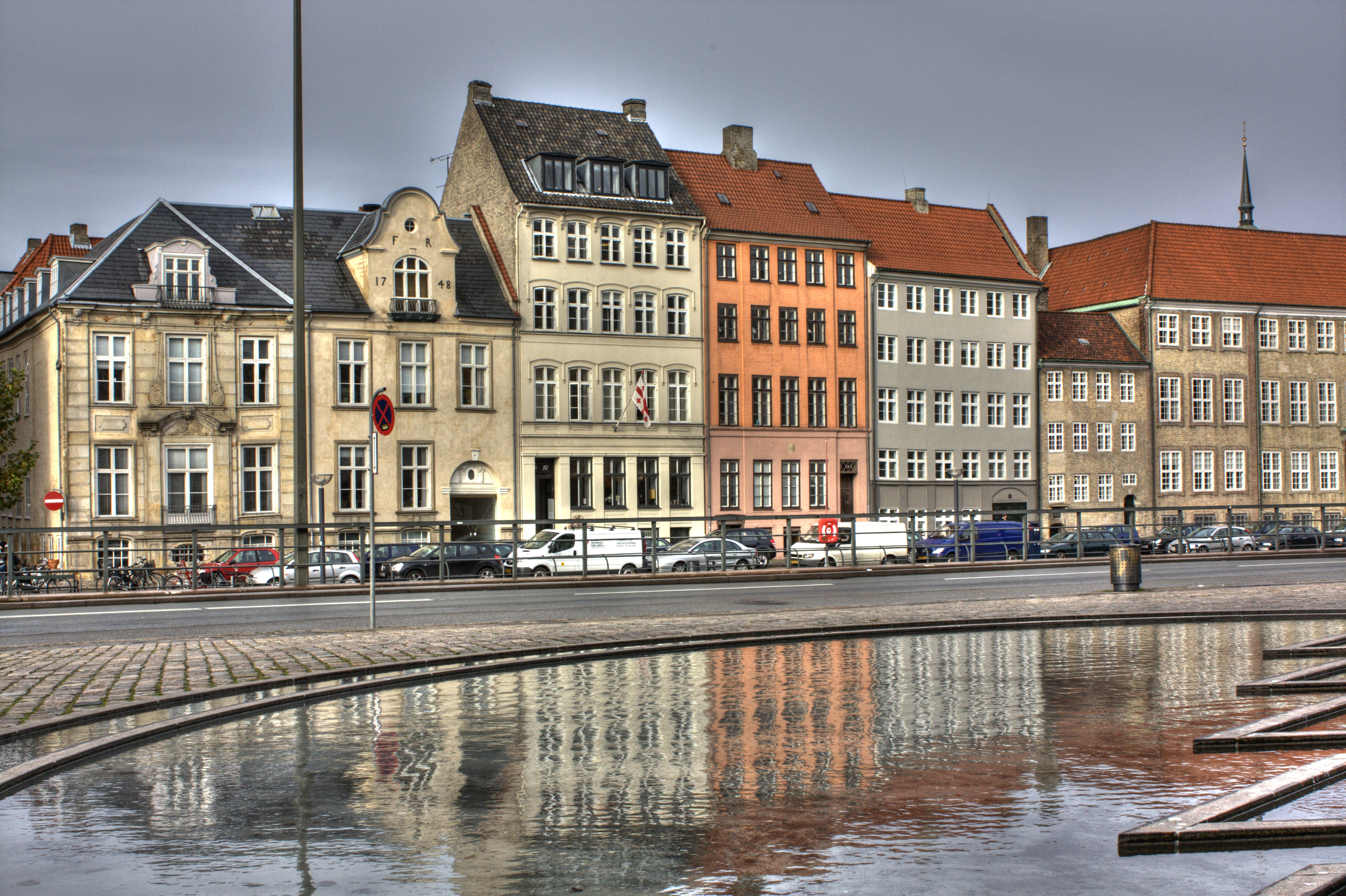
The square with the house row at Gammel Strand on the other side of Slotsholmen canal as a backdrop

Bertel Thorvaldsens Plads (English: Bertel Thorvaldsen's Square) is a public square located in front of Thorvaldsens Museum on Slotsholmen in central Copenhagen, Denmark. The two other sides of the triangular space are defined by the rear of Christiansborg Riding Grounds and Vindebrovej, the street along the Slotsholmen Canal which separates Slotsholmen from Gammel Strand.

== History ==
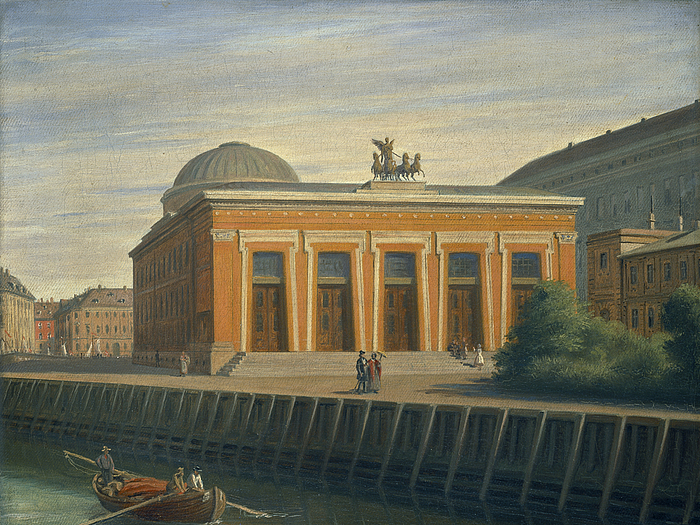
The square seen in a painting by Constantin Hansen from 1858 with the previous Christiansborg Palace seen to the right

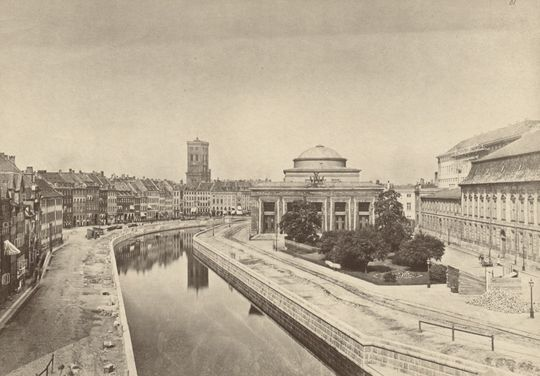
Photograph from the late 19th 19th century

When Thorvaldsens Museum was first built in 1848, its architect, Michael Gottlieb Bindesbøll, also sketched a project for a square in front of it. Inspired by the at that time newly built Alte Museum which he had seen on his visit to Berlin in 1824, he proposed a round stone basin filled with water in front of the museum. Another inspiration was the antique basins he had seen in Rome, which were used as fountains in the city. Bindesbøll's plans also included a replica of Bertel Thorvaldsen's self-portrait statue and some benches. The rest of the square was to be left empty. Bindesbøll's project was never realised and instead the square was laid out with a lawn and beech trees.

In 2001 the square was remodelled by landscape architect Torben Schønherr.

== Bertel Thorvaldsens Plads today ==
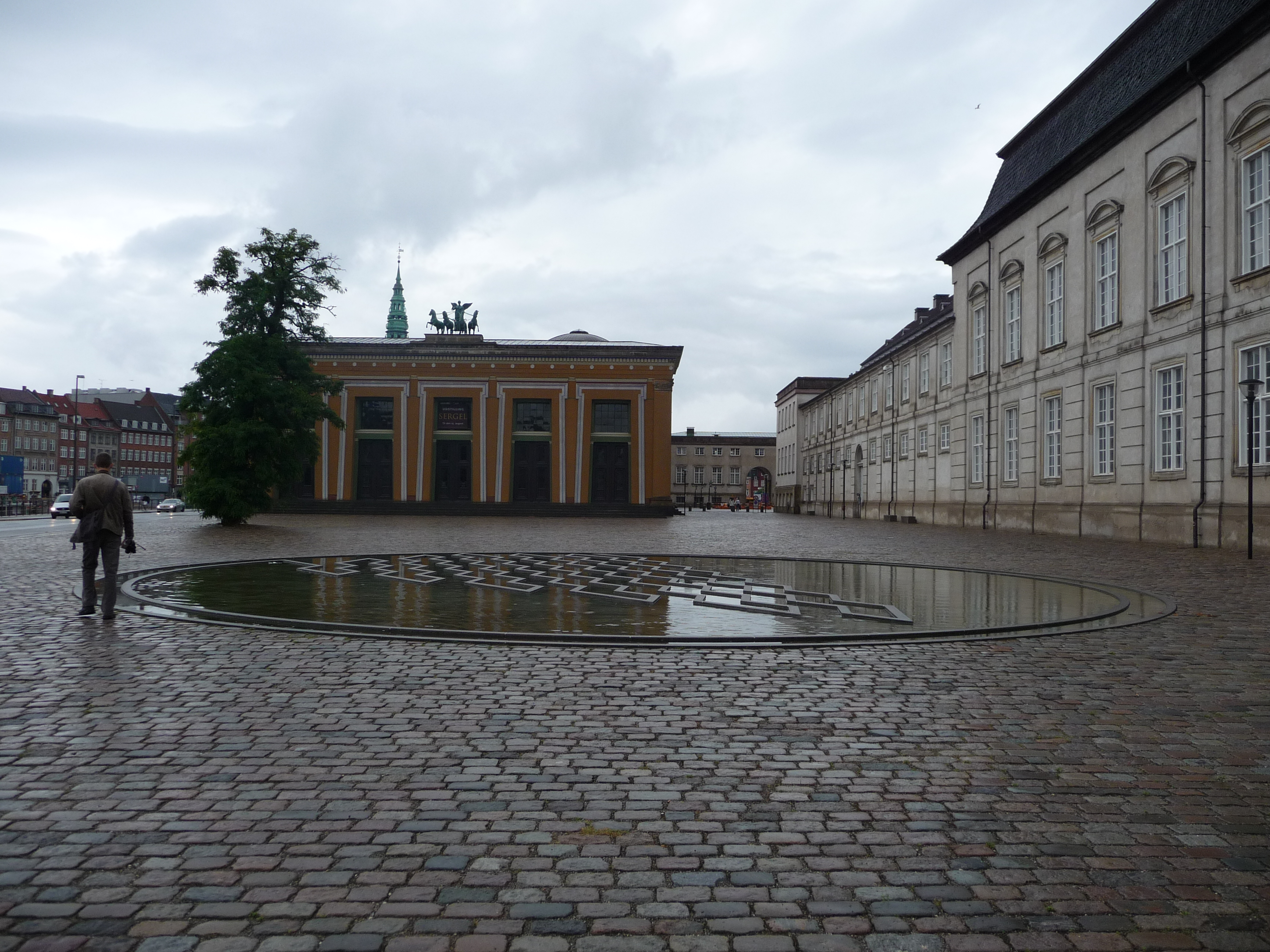
The square with Jørn Larsen's water feature and Thorvaldsens Museum

The square is paved with large cobblestones and a single tree and a reflecting pool are the only ornamental features. The pool is designed by Jørn Larsen and has a diameter of 16 metres and a geometrical pattern characteristic of his style.

The square is sometimes used for markets.

== See also ==
- Parks and open spaces in Copenhagen
