= Jarmers Plads =

Public square in Copenhagen, Denmark

Coordinates: 55.6788°N 12.5656°E

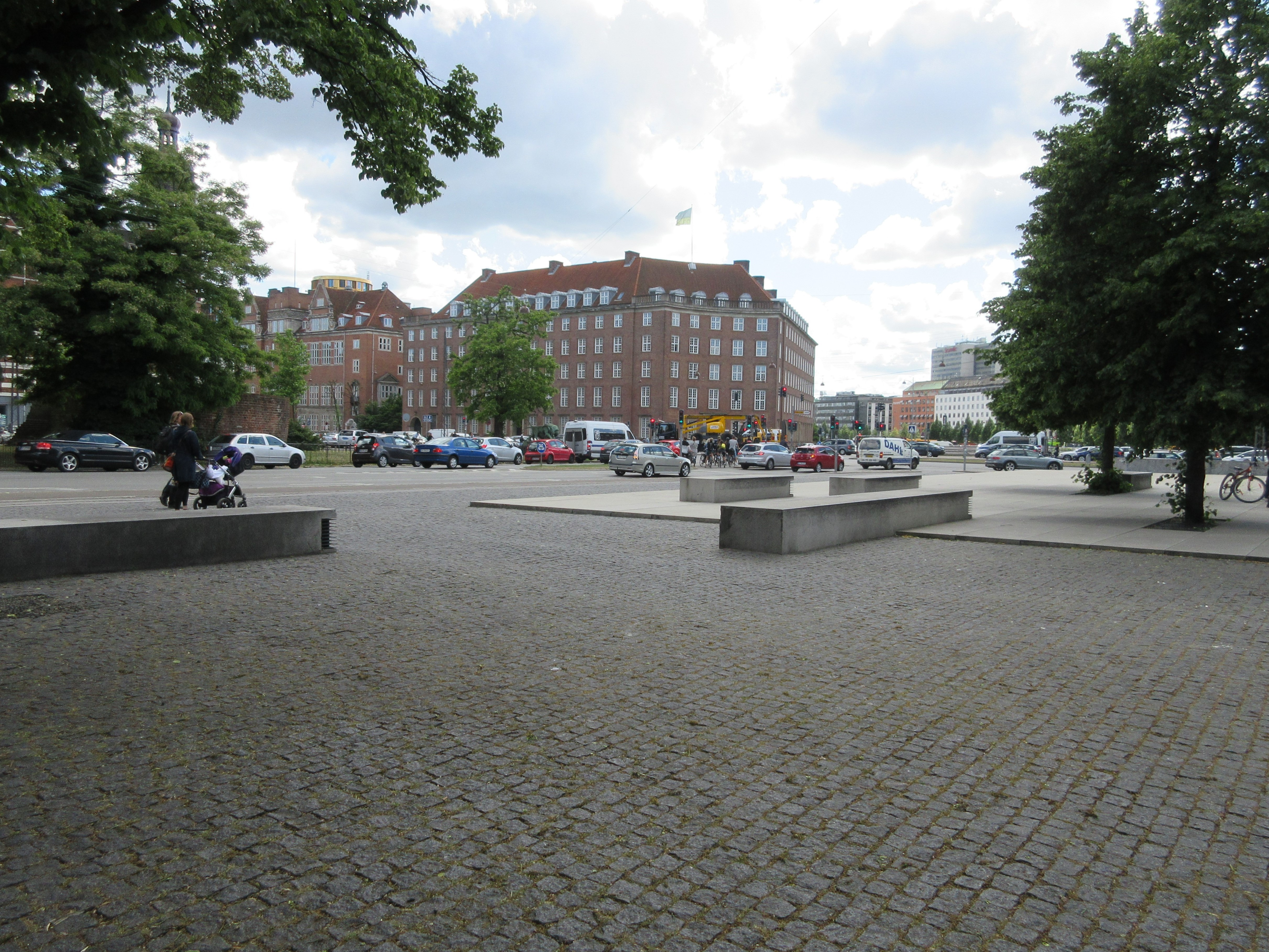
Jarmer Plads

Jarmers Plads is a road junction and public space in central Copenhagen, Denmark. It takes its name after Jarmers Tower, the ruin of a medieval tower which used to be part of the Fortification Ring which surrounded the city until the mid-19th century.

== History ==
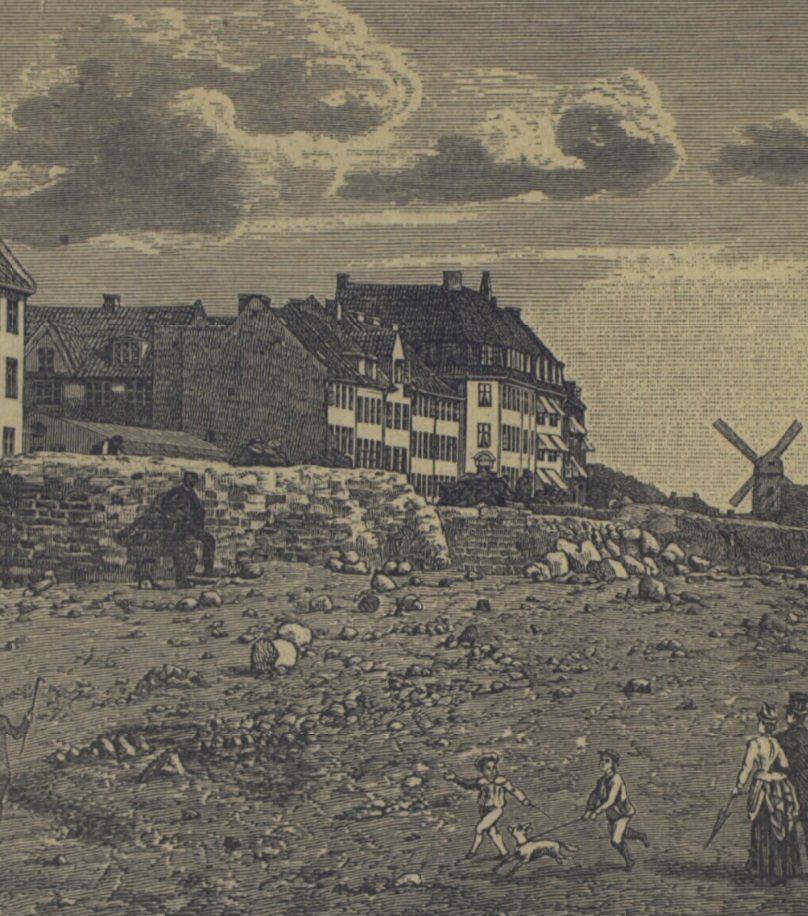
The ruins of Jarmer's Tower in 1885

When Copenhagen's fortifications were decommissioned in the second half of the 19th century, the ramparts were leveled and the moat filled in. Jarmer's Tower was long gone but the site was excavated in connection with the Nordic Exhibition of 1888 and the remains of the tower were afterwards restored as a ruin to commemorate the city's past as a fortified city.

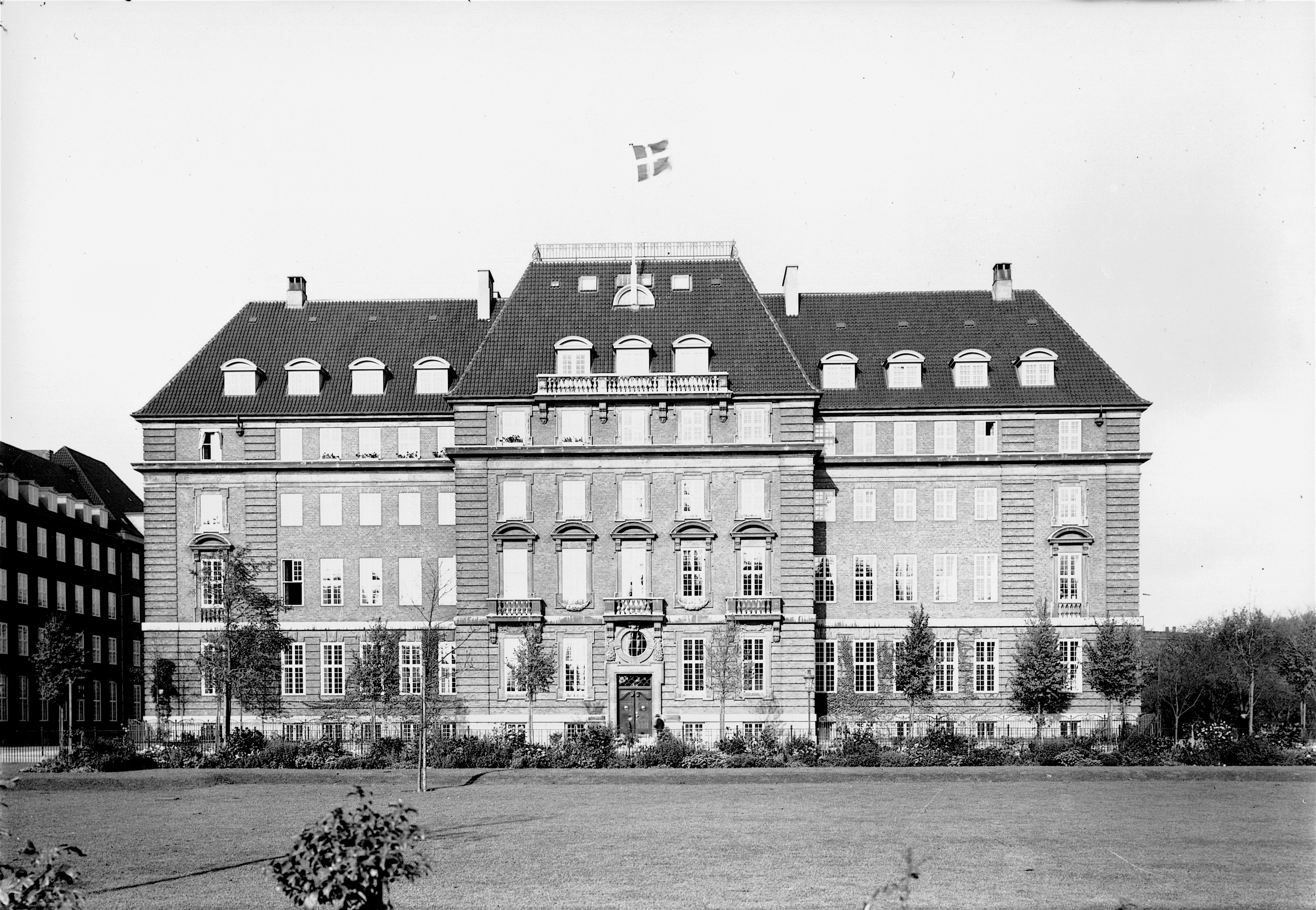
Østifternes Kreditforening

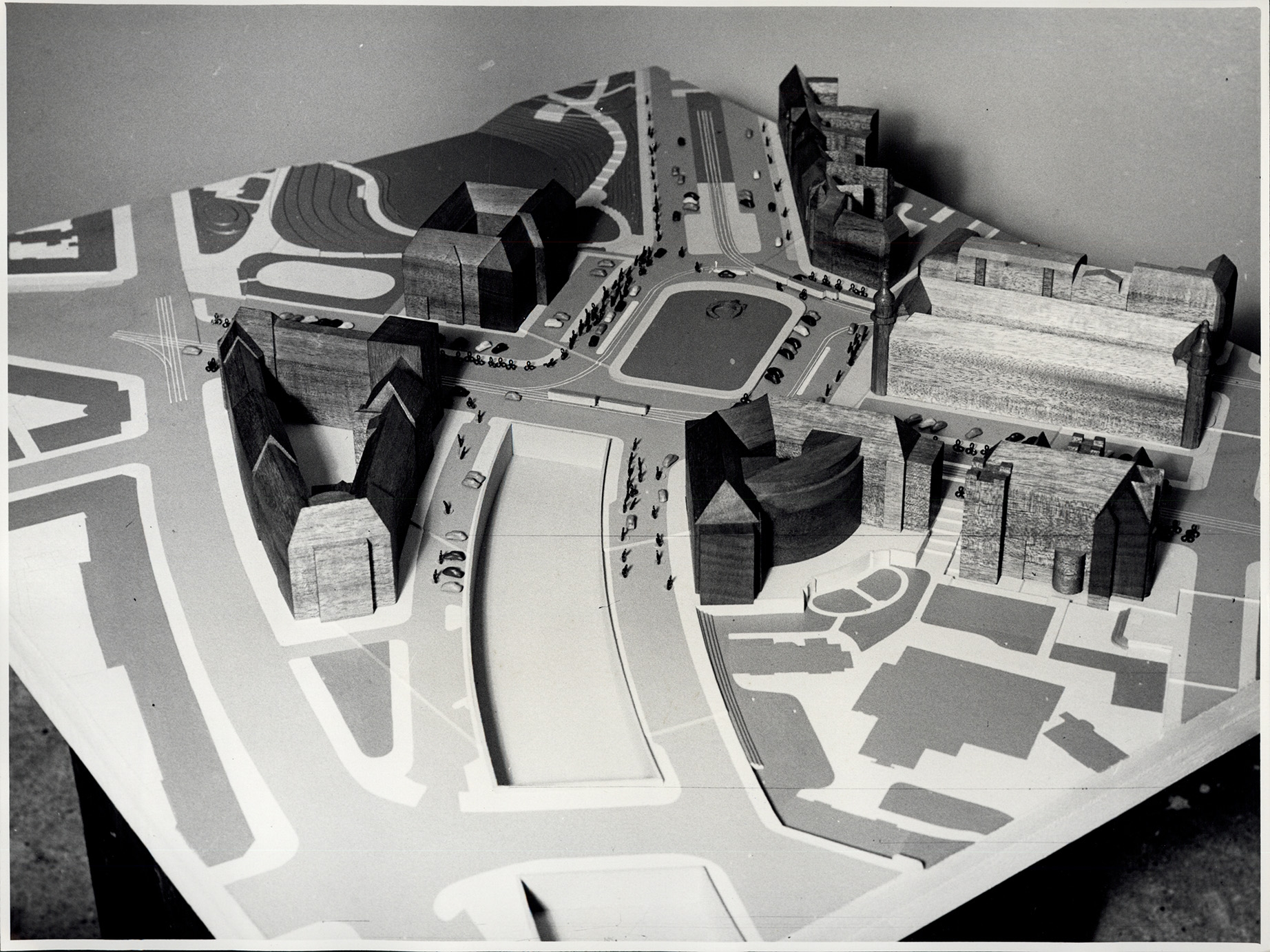
Model of the new square from 1953.

In 1913, it was decided to build a new head office for Østifternes Kreditforening at the site. An architectural competition for the design of the building was won by Ulrik Plesner and Valdemar Dan and the building was completed in 1916. Ot was demolished in 1954 when H. C. Andersens Boulevard was connected to Gyldenløvesgade. The only connection between the two streets had until then been the relatively narrow street Jarmersgade.

The area outside Realkredit Danmark's building at 2 Jarmers Plads was redesigned by Hansted Holscher Arkitekter in 1996–97.

== Today ==
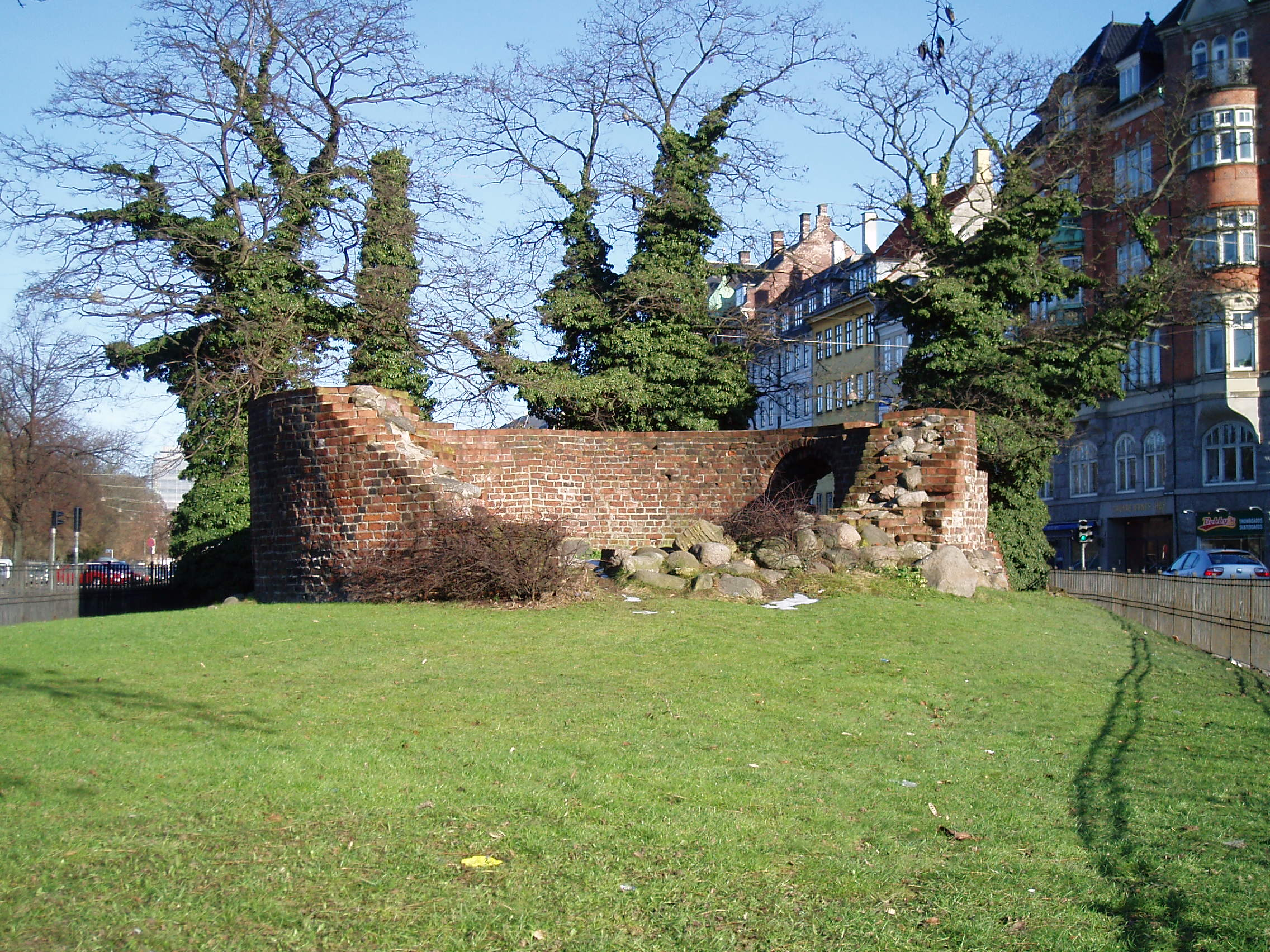
Jarmer's Tower

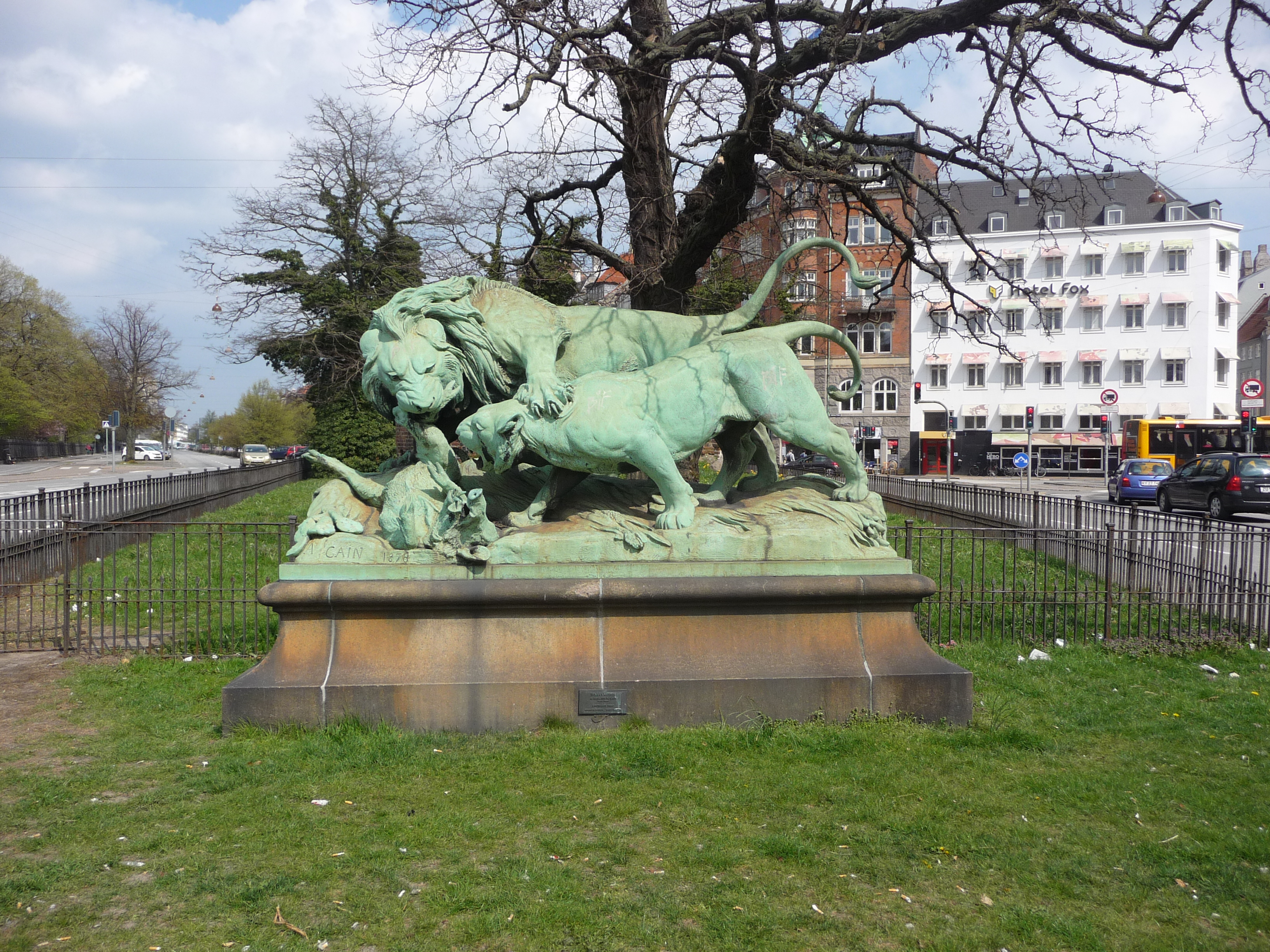
Cain's lions at Jarmers Plads

Jarmers Plads is divided in two by road lanes. The largest area is located adjacent to Ørsted Park.

A grassy area with the ruin of Jarmer's Tower is located at the corner of H. C. Andersens Boulevard and Nørregade. A copy of Auguste Cain sculpture Lion and Lioness (French: Lion et lionne se disputant un sanglier) stands next to the ruin. As indicated by the name, it shows a lion and a lioness fighting over a wild boar. The sculpture was created in 1879 and the copy was installed at the site in 1889 as a gift from Carl Jacobsen's Albertina Foundation.
