= Elisabethsminde =

Chocolate factory in Copenhagen, Denmark

- Founded: 1825; 200 years ago in Copenhagen, Denmark
- Founder: Peter Christian Deichmann
- Defunct: 1950
- Parent: Hintz & Co. (from 1872)

Elisabethsminde was a chocolate factory established in 1825 in Copenhagen, Denmark. It was taken over by the confectionery company Hintz & Co. in 1872 but the company once again operated under the name Elisabethsminde from 1880. It closed in the 1950s. Its former chocolate factory at Heimdalsgade 14–16 in the Nørrebro district of Copenhagen was converted into apartments in 2009.

== History ==
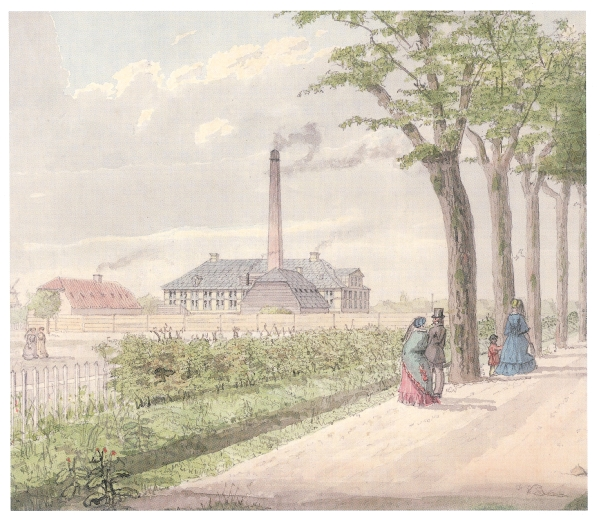
The Elisabethsminde chocolate factory depicted by Heinrich Gustav Ferdinand Holm in 1845

=== Elisabethsminde ===
The Elisabethsminde chocolate factory was established by Peter Christian Deichmann (1795-1848) in 1825. It was located at Peblinge Lake, between present day Nørre Søgade and Nansensgade. It changed hands several times. It installed one of the first steam engines in Copenhagen.

=== Hintz & Co. ===
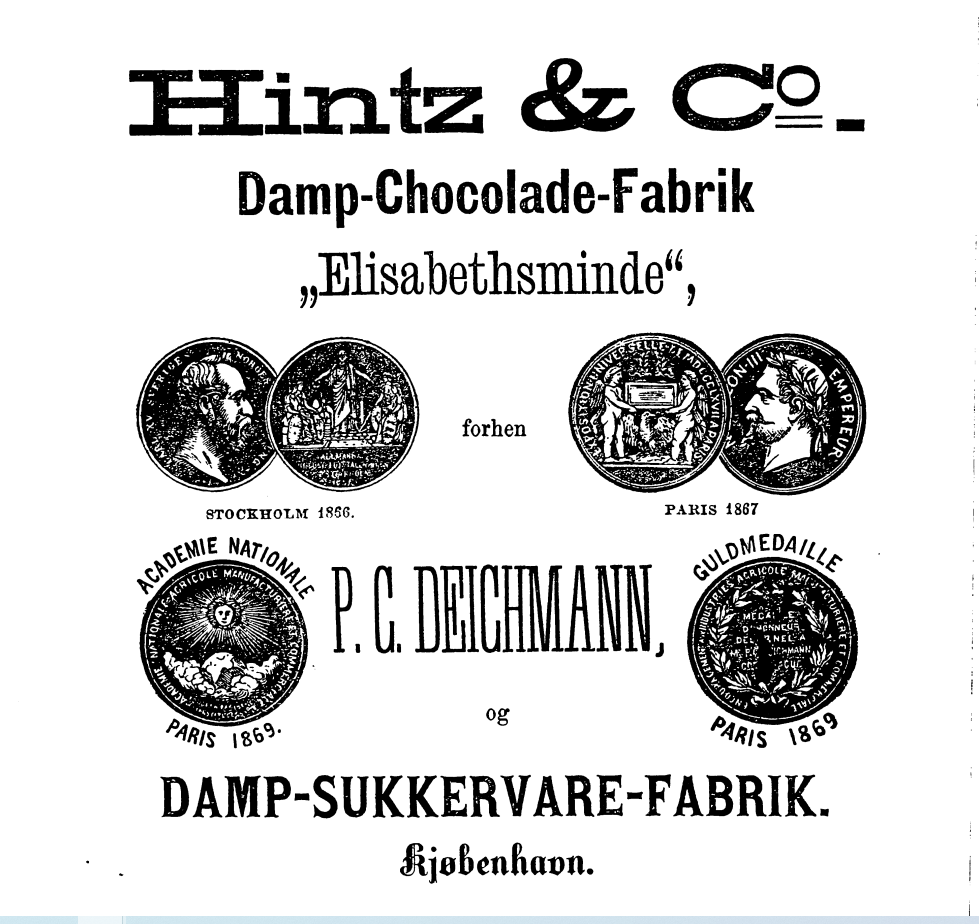
Advert from 1873 with the names Hintz & Co. and Elizabethsminde both mentioned.

Hintz & Co. was founded as a match factory in Schleswig by Christian Hintz and H. P. Danker (1838-1891) in 1857. Hintz left the company when it moved to Flensburg in 1859. The factory moved to Copenhagen in 1864.

In Copenhagen, Funker purchased a building in Sankt Annæ Gade in Christianshavn. He converted the premises into aconfectionery factory in 1867 or 1868, selling his old machines to Carl Conrad Kjær, who moved them to Thyrasgade 5 where he operated a match factory first under the name Hintz & Co. and later as Kjær & Gottlieb.

=== The merged company ===
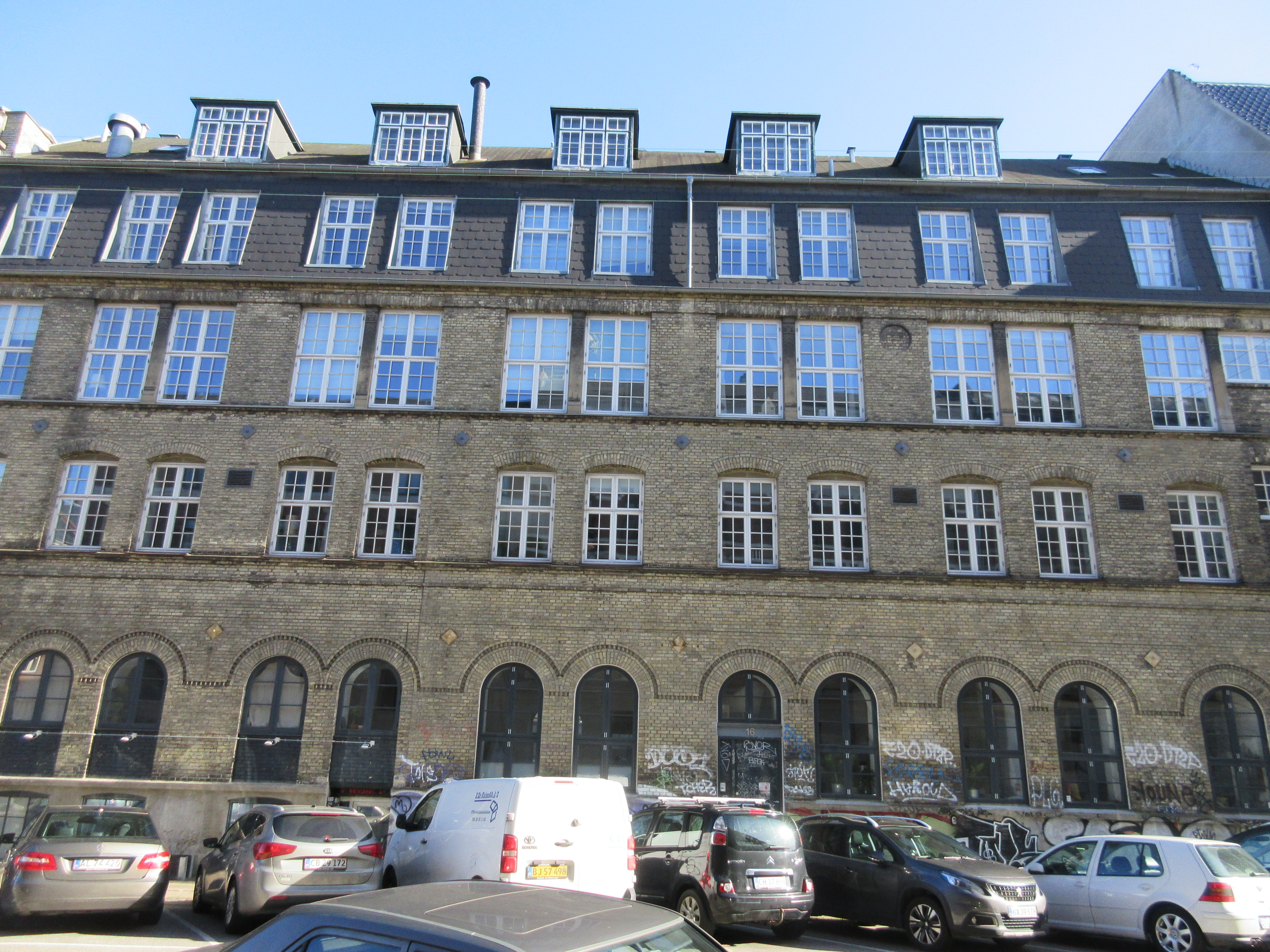
Hintz & Co.'s building from 1914 at Heimdalsgade 14–16 which has now been converted into apartments

In 1872 H. P. Danker sold the company to K. V. Groth and C. A. F. Winkel (died 1876) but joined it again later that same year when it acquired the Elisabethsminde chocolate factory. Elisabethsminde's building complex at Nørre Søgade was expanded. K. V. Groth and C. A. F. Winkel sold their shares of the company while Winkel's father Adolf Nicolaj Winkel (1809-1885) became a co-owner. The company operated under the name Elisabethsminde from 1880.

The company was converted into a limited company (A/S) after Adolf Nicolaj Winkel's death in 1885. His widow inherited his share of the company and became its sole owner after Danker's death in 1891.

The company was converted into a limited company (A/S) in 1895. The company also owned the Luzern chocolate factory as well as Vejle Chokoladefabrik which relocated to the Freeport of Copenhagen in 1908. Hintz & Co. moved to Heimdalsgade in 1914. The company used the building until 1928. It closed in the 1950s.

== Legacy ==
The company's former building at Heimdalsvej 14–16 was converted into 21 apartments in 2009.
