= Princess Louise =

Princess Louise may refer to:

== People ==
- Louise of Denmark (disambiguation), various princesses
- Louise de Lorraine (disambiguation), various princesses
- Louise of Prussia (disambiguation), various princesses
- Louise of Saxe-Meiningen (disambiguation), various princesses
- Princess Louise of Schleswig-Holstein (disambiguation), various princesses
- Louise of Sweden (disambiguation), various princesses

=== Belgian ===
- Princess Louise of Belgium (1858–1924), daughter of Leopold II, King of the Belgians
- Princess Louise of Belgium (born 2004), daughter of Prince Laurent of Belgium and granddaughter of Albert II, King of the Belgians

=== British ===
- Louise of Great Britain (1724–1751), first queen consort of Frederick V, King of Denmark and British princess by birth
- Princess Louise, Duchess of Argyll (1848–1939), daughter of Victoria, Queen of the United Kingdom
- Louise, Princess Royal (1867–1931), daughter of Edward VII, King of the United Kingdom and British princess
- Lady Louise Windsor (born 2003), daughter of Prince Edward, Duke of Edinburgh and granddaughter of Elizabeth II, Queen of the United Kingdom

=== Dutch ===
- Princess Louise of Orange-Nassau (1770–1819), daughter of William V, Prince of Orange
- Louise of the Netherlands (1828–1871), queen consort of Charles XV, King of Sweden and Dutch princess by birth

=== French ===
- Louise of Valois (c. 1515 – 1518), daughter of Francis I, King of France and French princess
- Louise of France (1737–1787), daughter of Louis XV, King of France and French princess
- Louise of Orléans (1812–1850), queen consort of Leopold I, King of the Belgians and princess of Orléans by birth
- Princess Louise d'Artois (1819–1864), duchess consort of Charles III, Duke of Parma and regent of Robert I, Duke of Parma
- Louise d'Orléans (1869–1952), daughter of Prince Ferdinand, Duke of Alençon and princess of Orléans
- Princess Louise of Orléans (1882–1958), daughter of Prince Philippe, Count of Paris

=== German (pre-1770) ===
- Louise of Anhalt-Dessau (1631–1680), daughter of John Casimir, Prince of Anhalt-Dessau and German princess
- Louise of Anhalt-Dessau (1709–1732), princess consort of Victor Frederick, Prince of Anhalt-Bernburg
- Princess Louise of Brandenburg-Schwedt (1750–1811), duchess consort of Leopold III, Duke of Anhalt-Dessau
- Princess Louise of Stolberg-Gedern (1752–1824), spouse of Charles Edward Stuart, Jacobite pretender
- Princess Louise of Saxe-Gotha-Altenburg (1756–1808), spouse of Frederick Francis I, Grand Duke of Mecklenburg-Schwerin
- Princess Louise Eleonore of Hohenlohe-Langenburg (1763–1837), duchess consort of George I, Duke of Saxe-Meiningen and regent of Bernhard II, Duke of Saxe-Meiningen
- Princess Louise of Stolberg-Gedern (1764–1834), duchess consort of Karl Wilhelm, Duke of Saxe-Meiningen

=== German (post-1770) ===
- Louise of Baden (1779–1826) also known as Elizaveta Alekseyevna, empress consort of Alexander I, Emperor of Russia and princess of Baden by birth
- Princess Louise of Saxe-Hildburghausen (1794–1825), duchess consort of William, Duke of Nassau
- Princess Louise of Anhalt-Dessau (1798–1858), landgravine consort of Gustav, Landgrave of Hesse-Homburg
- Princess Louise of Anhalt-Bernburg (1799–1882), daughter of Alexius Frederick Christian, Duke of Anhalt-Bernburg
- Princess Louise of Saxe-Gotha-Altenburg (1800–1831), first wife of Ernest I, Duke of Saxe-Coburg and Gotha
- Louise of Hesse-Kassel (1817–1898), queen consort of Christian IX, King of Denmark and princess of Hesse-Kassel by birth
- Princess Louise of Thurn and Taxis (1859–1948), daughter of Maximilian Anton, Hereditary Prince of Thurn and Taxis
- Louise Mountbatten (1889–1965), queen consort of Gustav VI Adolf, King of Sweden who was born Princess Louise of Battenberg

=== Italian ===
- Louise of Savoy (nun) (1461–1503), princess of Savoy by birth
- Louise of Savoy (1476–1531), regent of Francis I, King of France and princess of Savoy by birth
- Princess Louise of Savoy (1627–1689), daughter of Thomas Francis, Prince of Carignano

== Transportation ==
- Princess Louise (sidewheeler), a sidewheel steamboat built in 1869
- Princess Louise, a numbered GWR 3031 Class locomotive built in 1898
- SS Princess Louise (1921), a luxury cruise ship that was converted into a floating restaurant

== Other uses ==
- Princess Louise, Holborn, a historic public house in the United Kingdom
- 8th Canadian Hussars (Princess Louise's)

== See also ==
- Louise de Brézé (1521–1577), French noble and spouse of Claude, Duke of Aumale
- Louise Marguerite of Lorraine (1588–1631), daughter of Henry I, Duke of Guise and princess of Lorraine
- Duchess Luise of Brunswick-Wolfenbüttel (1722–1780), daughter of Ferdinand Albert II, Duke of Brunswick-Wolfenbüttel
- Louise of Stolberg-Wernigerode (1771–1856), countess and abbess of Drübeck Abbey
- Princess Louise Amelie of Baden (1811–1854), daughter of Charles, Grand Duke of Baden
- Louise de Mérode (1819–1868), Belgian noble and spouse of Carlo Emanuele dal Pozzo, 5th Prince of La Cisterna
- Archduchess Louise of Austria (1870–1947), daughter of Ferdinand IV, Grand Duke of Tuscany
- Princess Märtha Louise of Norway (born 1971), daughter of Harald V, King of Norway
- Landgravine Louise of Hesse-Darmstadt (disambiguation)
- Prince Louis (disambiguation)
- Princess Louisa (disambiguation)
- Princess Louise Hospital, a former hospital in the United Kingdom
- Princess Louise II, a floating restaurant named after SS Princess Louise (1921) that originally was the steamship Lady Alexandra
- Princess Marie Louise (disambiguation)
  - Princess Marie Louise of Orleans (disambiguation)
- Queen Louise (disambiguation)
- Louise (disambiguation)
