= Søgade, Copenhagen =

Streets in Copenhagen, Denmark

Coordinates: 55.6839°N 12.5631°E

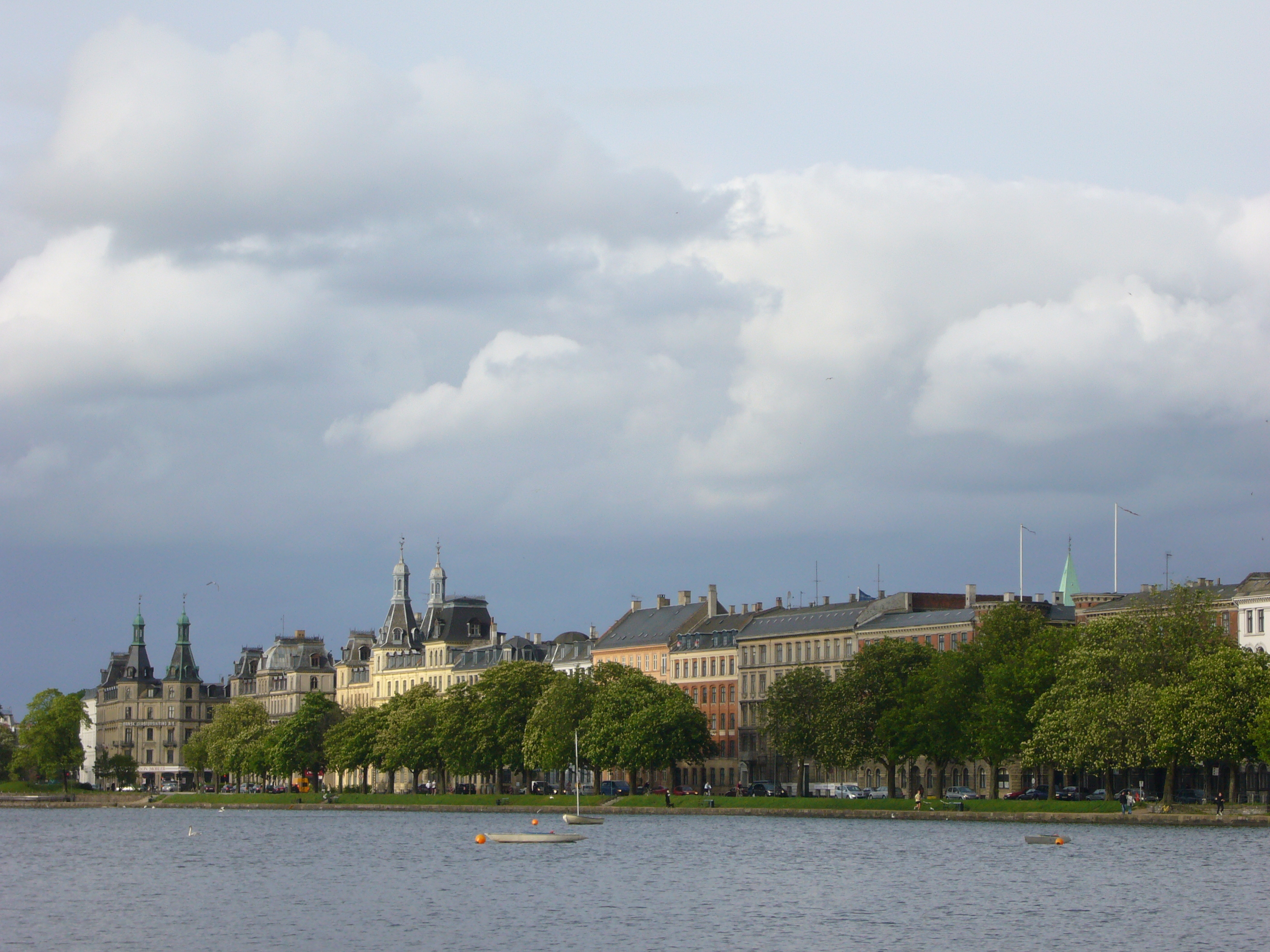
Nørre Søgade with the Søtorvet development.

Vester, Nørre and Øster Søgade (lit. "West, North and East Lake Street") is a succession of streets along the eastern side of The Lakes in central Copenhagen, Denmark. The streets run from Gammel Kongevej to the south to the beginning of Østerbrogade at Lille Trianglen in the north. Vester Søgade runs from Gammel Kongevej to Gyldenløvesgade, Nørre Søgade runs from Gyldenløvesgade to Dronning Louises Bro, and Øster Søgade from Dronning Louises Bro to Lille Triangel.

== History ==
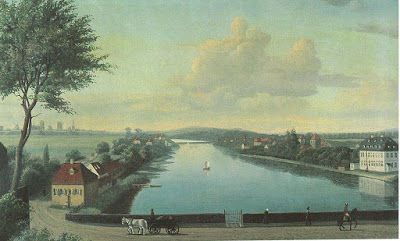
Sortedam Lake viewed from the north with the northern end of Kærlighedsstien visible to the left

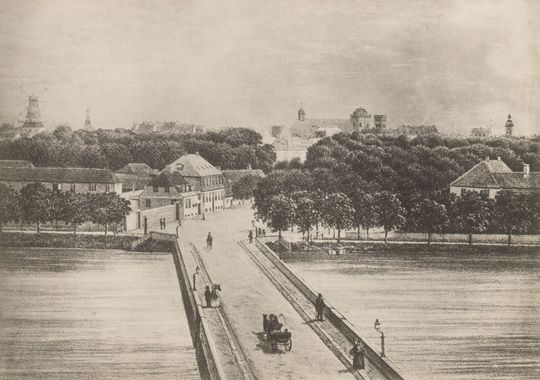
The Peblinge Bridge (now Queen Louise's Bridge) and the section of the Lovers' Path where Søtorvet stands today

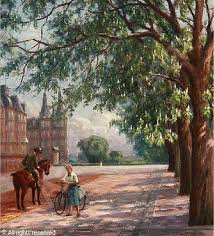
Øster Søgade in 1934, painting by Hans Hilsøe

The street is situated on the former glacis outside Copenhagen's long gone bastioned fortifications. A path known as Kærlighedsstien ("The Lover's Path") followed the east side of The Lakes where Søgade runs today. The north part of the street was created after the fortifications were decommissioned in the second half of the 19th century. Nørre Voldgade was completed in July 1873.

Nørre and Øster Søgade were established in the 19th century. Vester Søgade, on the other hand, was not created until Sankt Jørgens Sø was given up as a water reservoir.

In the 1960s, there were plans to make the streets part of a six-lane motorway, Søringen, which was supposed to connect the northern part of Zealand with a new modern city centre in the Vesterbro area but the plans were abandoned.

== Notable buildings ==
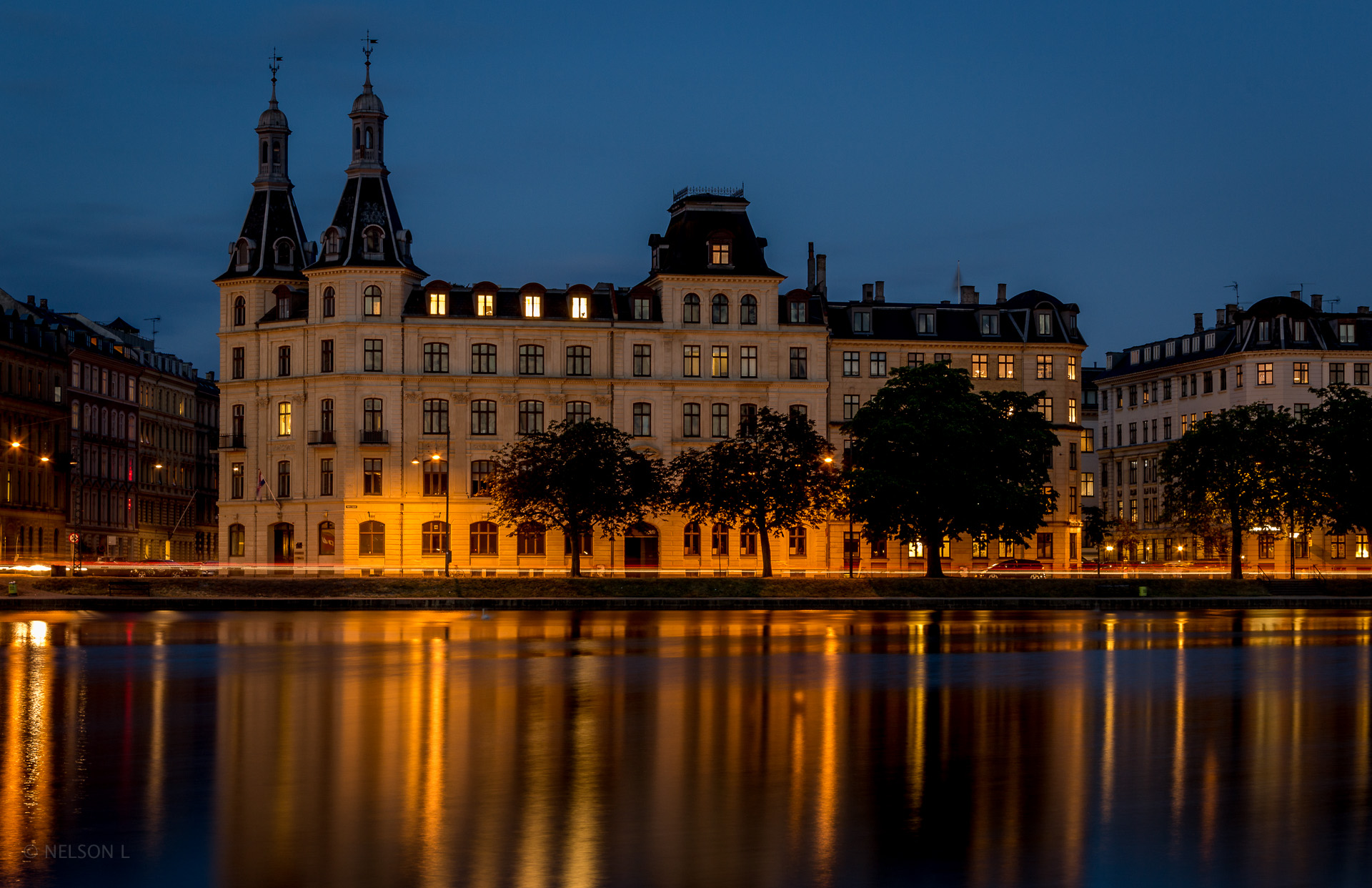
Nørre Søgade 7: One of the four buildings that form Søtorvet

The eastern side of the street is mostly lined with residential buildings of a diverse character which reflect the difference in their age. Søtorvet, a stately, symmetrical development flanking the streets Frederiksborggade, Gothersgade and Vendersgade at the end of Queen Louise's Bridge, was built from 1872 to 1875. The adjacent building at Nordre Søgade 8 is the former Østersøgade Gymnasium. The school moved to Gentofte in 1964 and is now known as Kildegård Privatskole.

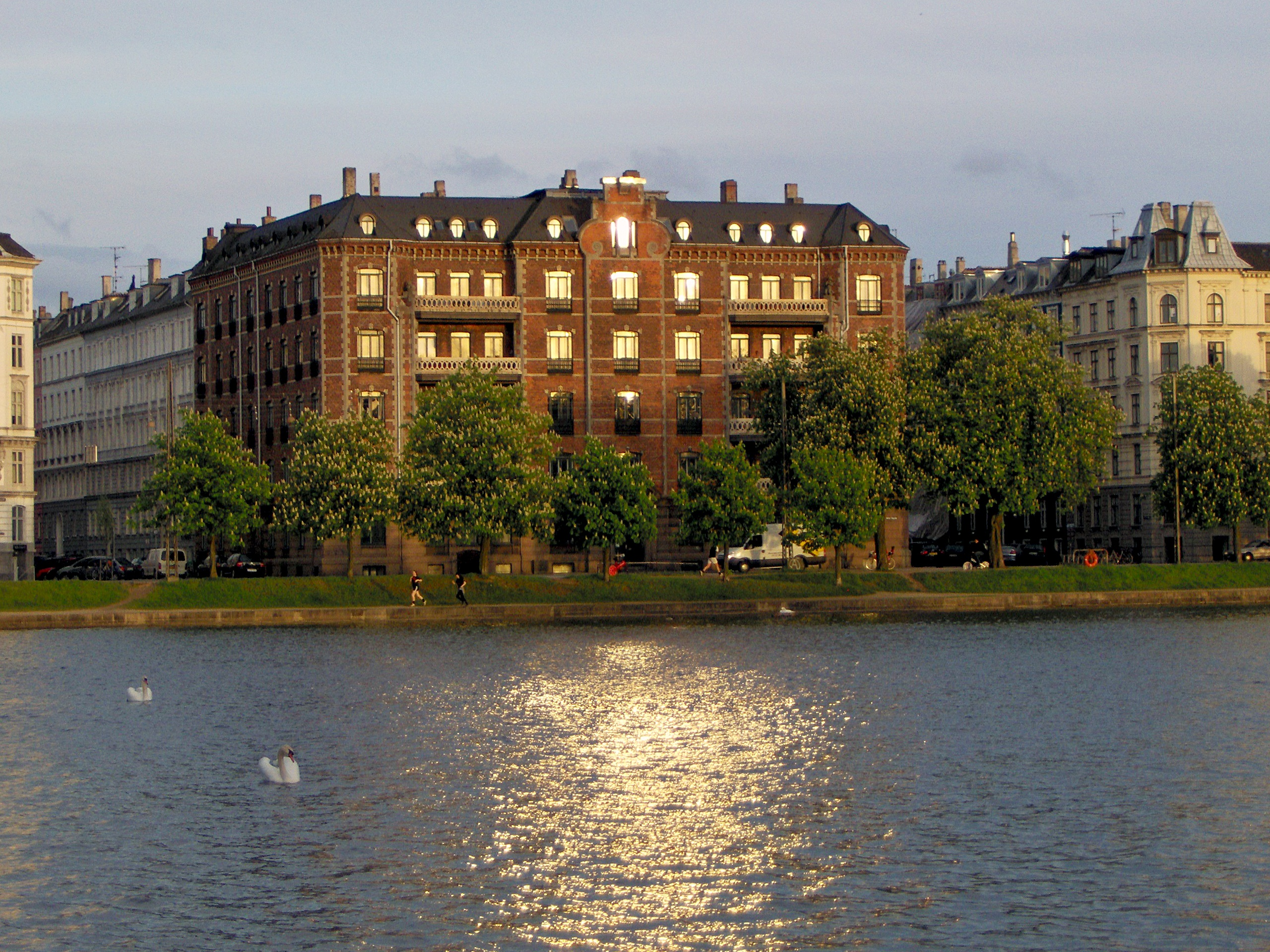
Øster Søgade 32

Just north of Søtorvet, the street passes the rear side of the former Copenhagen Municipal Hospital, now part of University of Copenhagen's City Campus. Completed in 1863, the hospital was one of the first buildings to be built outside the old fortifications. Then follows a number of late 19th century apartment buildings. Rørholm at Øster Søgade 32 was completed in 1884. North of Sølvgade and Fredens Bro, the street is bordered by Kartoffelrækkerne, an extensive area of terraced houses built by the Workers' Building Society to provide healthy homes for the city's workers.

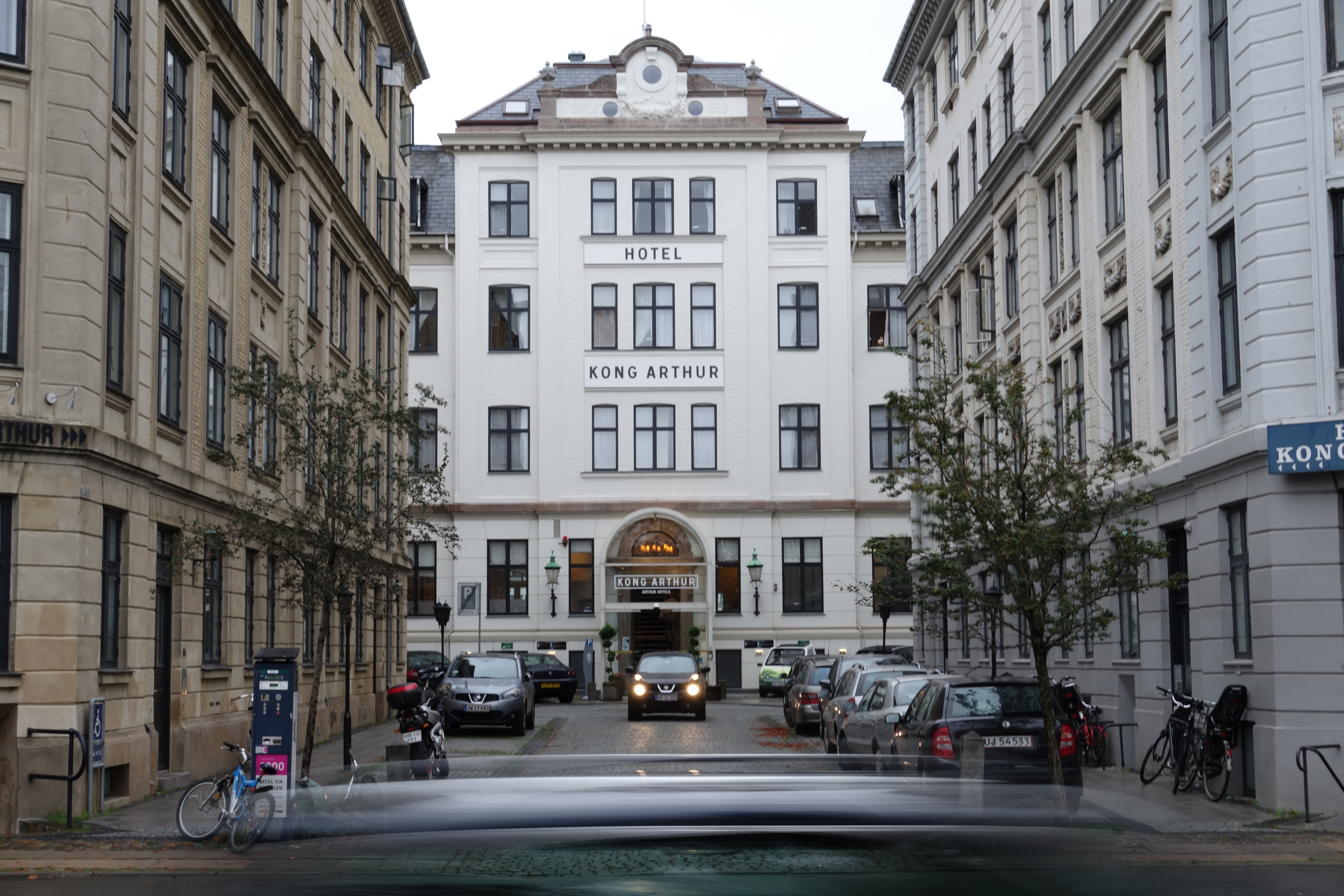
Hotel Kong Arthur

Just south of Søtorvet, at the end of a small cul-de-sac, is Hotel Kong Arthur. The building was originally a home for apprentices. It was designed by Georg Ebbe Wineken Møller and inaugurated on 4 October 1882. The former Catholic Apostolic church on the corner of Nørre Søgade and Gyldenløvesgade was inaugurated on 1 August 1870.

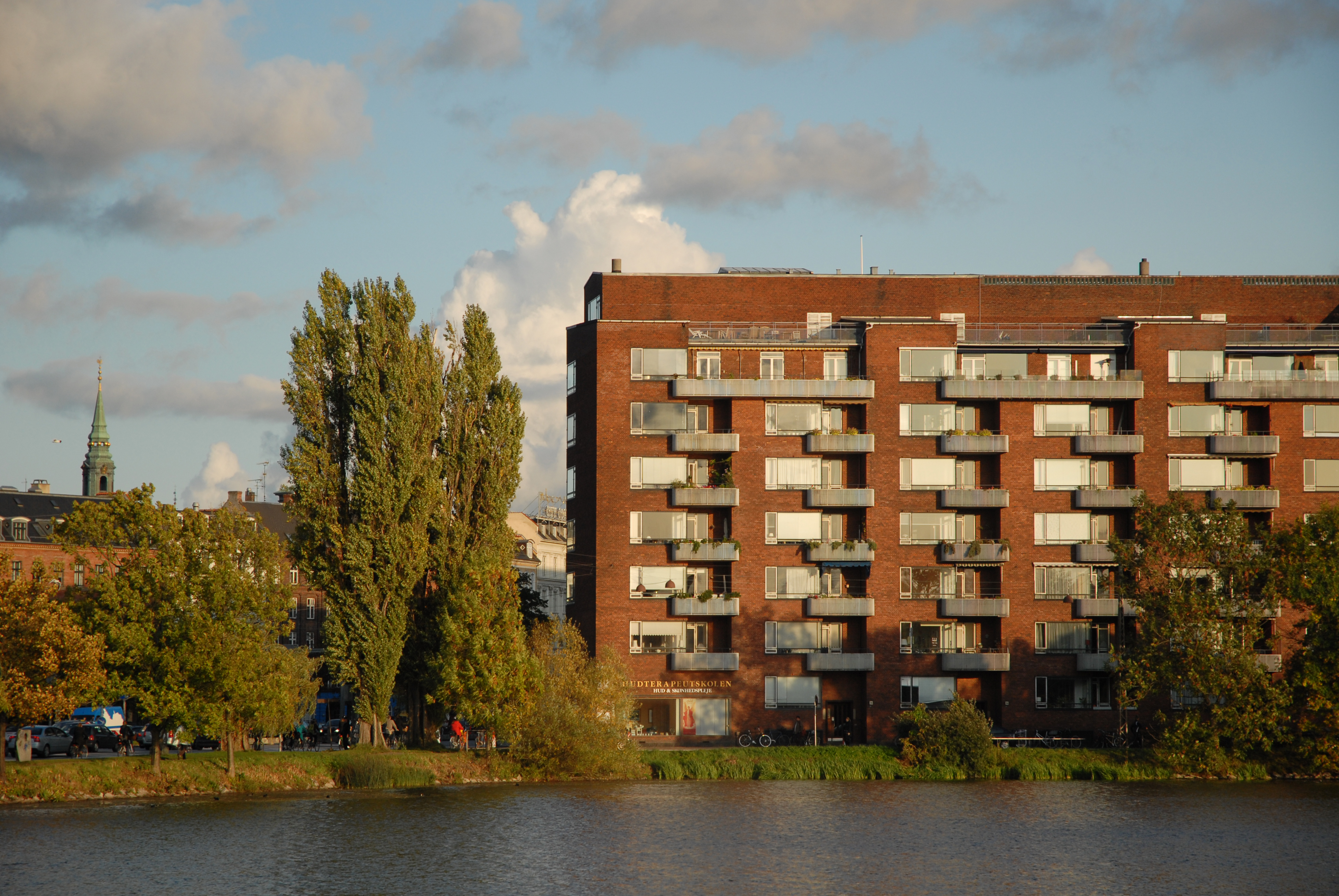
Vestersøhus

Vester Søgade is dominated by Vestersøhus which was designed by Kay Fisker and C. F. Møller and completed in 1939. With its balcony-bay window concept, it became a model for later Danish residential architecture. The building was listed in 1994.

South of Vester Søhus, on the corner of Gammel Kongevej, stands the 18-storey Scandic Copenhagen Hotel.

== Cultural references ==
Hotel Sheraton (Vester Søgade 6, now Hotel Scandic) is used as a location at 0:37:08 in the 1972 Olsen-banden film The Olsen Gang's Big Score. Egon (Ove Sprogøe) later wakes up on a bench in Vester Søgade at 0:50:02 in the same film.

== See also ==
- Vester, Nørre and Øster Farimagsgade
