= Louise of Prussia =

Louise of Prussia (German: Luise von Preußen) may refer to:

- Princess Louise of Prussia (1770–1836), daughter of Prince Augustus Ferdinand of Prussia
- Queen Louise of Prussia (1776–1810), queen consort of Prussia by marriage to King Frederick William III
- Princess Louise of Prussia (1808–1870), daughter of King Frederick William III
- Princess Louise of Prussia (1829–1901), daughter of Prince Charles of Prussia and landgravine consort of Alexis, Landgrave of Hesse-Philippsthal-Barchfeld
- Princess Louise of Prussia (1838–1923), daughter of William I, German Emperor and King of Prussia and grand duchess consort of Frederick I, Grand Duke of Baden
- Princess Louise Margaret of Prussia (1860–1917), daughter of Prince Frederick Charles of Prussia

== See also ==
- Countess Louise Henriette of Nassau (1627–1667), duchess consort of Prussia by marriage to Duke Frederick William
- Princess Louise Dorothea of Prussia (1680–1705), daughter of King Frederick I
- Sophia Louise of Mecklenburg-Schwerin (1685–1735), queen consort in Prussia by marriage to King Frederick I
- Louisa Ulrika of Prussia (1720–1782), daughter of King Frederick William I and queen consort of Adolf Frederick, King of Sweden
- Frederica Louisa of Hesse-Darmstadt (1751–1805), queen consort of Prussia by marriage to King Frederick William II
- Princess Victoria Louise of Prussia (1892–1980), daughter of William II, German Emperor and King of Prussia and duchess consort of Ernest Augustus, Duke of Brunswick
- Königin Luise (disambiguation)
- Louise, Queen of Prussia (film), a 1931 German film
- Princess Louise (disambiguation)
- Queen Louise (disambiguation)
