= Louise of Denmark =

Louise of Denmark (Danish: Louise af Danmark) may refer to:

- Louise of Mecklenburg-Güstrow (1667–1721), queen consort of King Frederick IV
- Louise of Great Britain (1724–1751), queen consort of King Frederick V
- Princess Louise of Denmark (1726–1756), daughter of King Christian VI and duchess consort of Ernest Frederick III, Duke of Saxe-Hildburghausen
- Princess Louise of Denmark (1750–1831), daughter of King Frederick V
- Louise of Hesse-Kassel (1817–1898), queen consort of King Christian IX
- Louise of Sweden (1851–1926), queen consort of King Frederick VIII
- Princess Louise of Denmark (1875–1906), daughter of King Frederick VIII

== See also ==
- Princess Louise Auguste of Denmark (1771–1843), daughter of King Christian VII and duchess consort of Frederick Christian II, Duke of Schleswig-Holstein-Sonderburg-Augustenburg
- Princess Louise Charlotte of Denmark (1789–1864), daughter of Frederick, Hereditary Prince of Denmark
- Princess Louise (disambiguation)
- Queen Louise (disambiguation)
