= Frederiksborggade =

Street in Copenhagen, Denmark

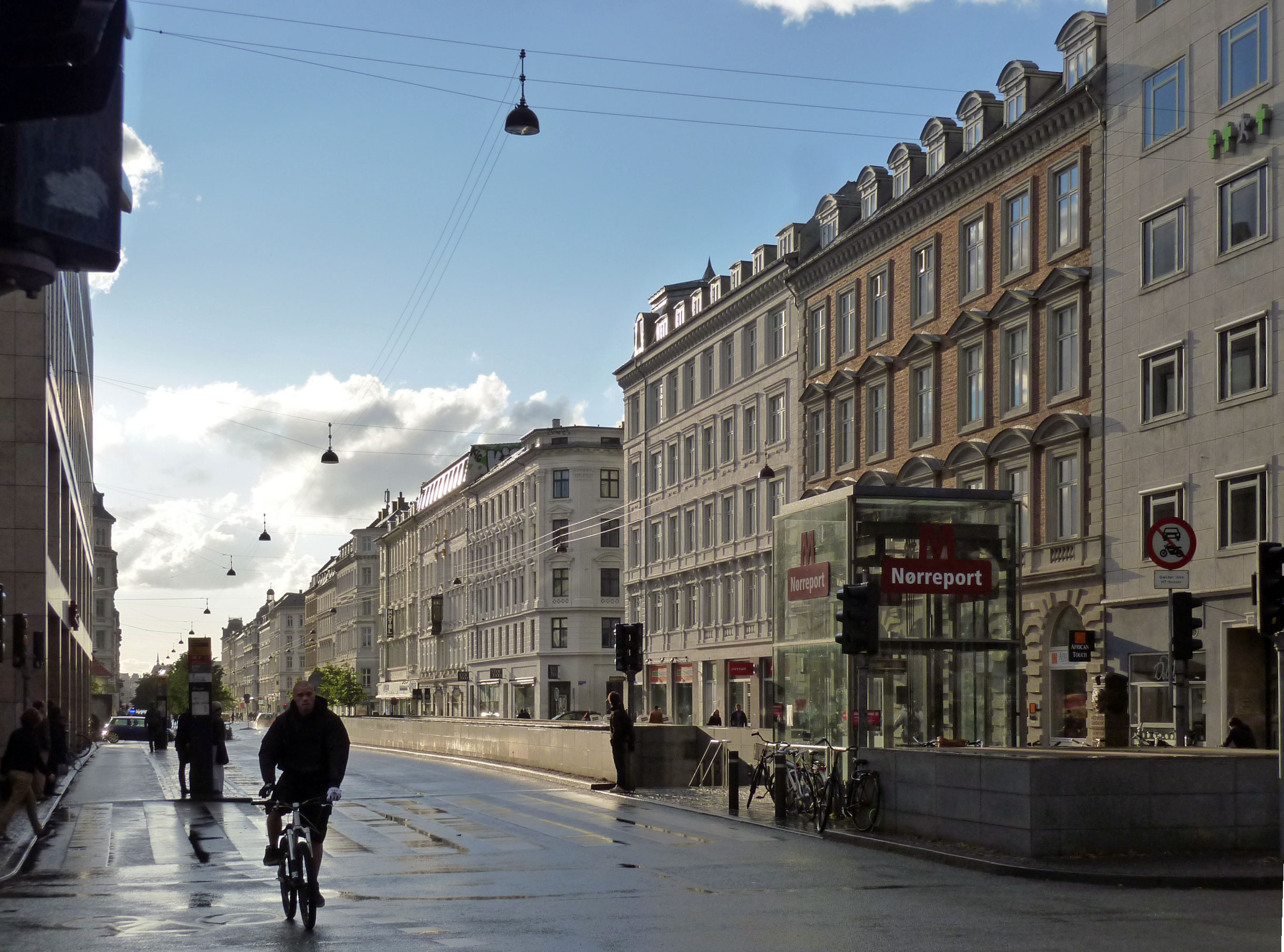
- Frederiksborggade with the entrance to Nørreport metro station to the right
- Interactive map of Frederiksborggade
- Length: 645 m (2,116 ft)
- Location: Indre By, Copenhagen, Denmark
- Postal code: 1360
- Nearest metro station: Nørreport
- Coordinates: 55°41′5.28″N 12°34′6.24″E

Frederiksborggade is a street in central Copenhagen, Denmark. It runs from Kultorvet square in the southeast to Søtorvet where Queen Louise's Bridge connects it to Nørrebrogade in Nørrebro on the other side of The Lakes. The street is effectively divided in two by Nørreport station on Nørre Voldgade. The short, southern portion, together with Kultorvet and Købmagergade, forms a pedestrian zone between the station and Strøget at Amagertorv. The wider and younger northern portion is open to car traffic.

== History ==
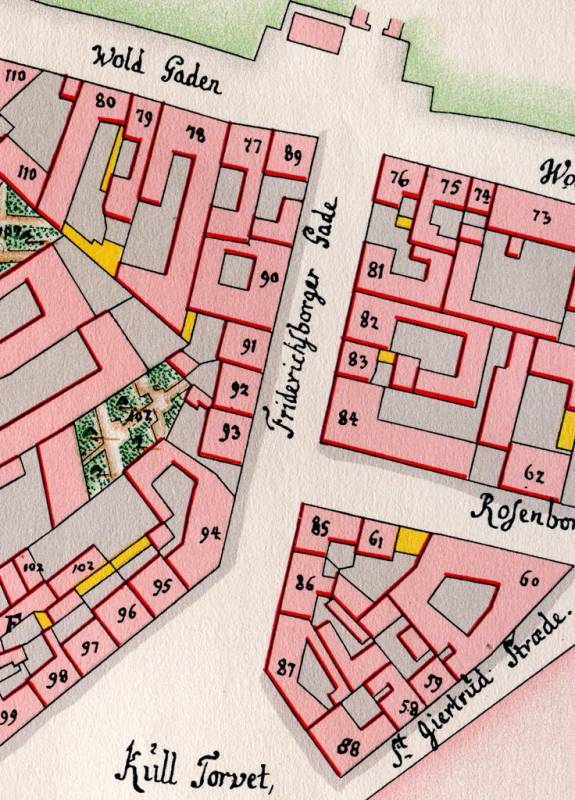
Frederiksborggade viewed on Gedde's map of Copenhagen from 1757

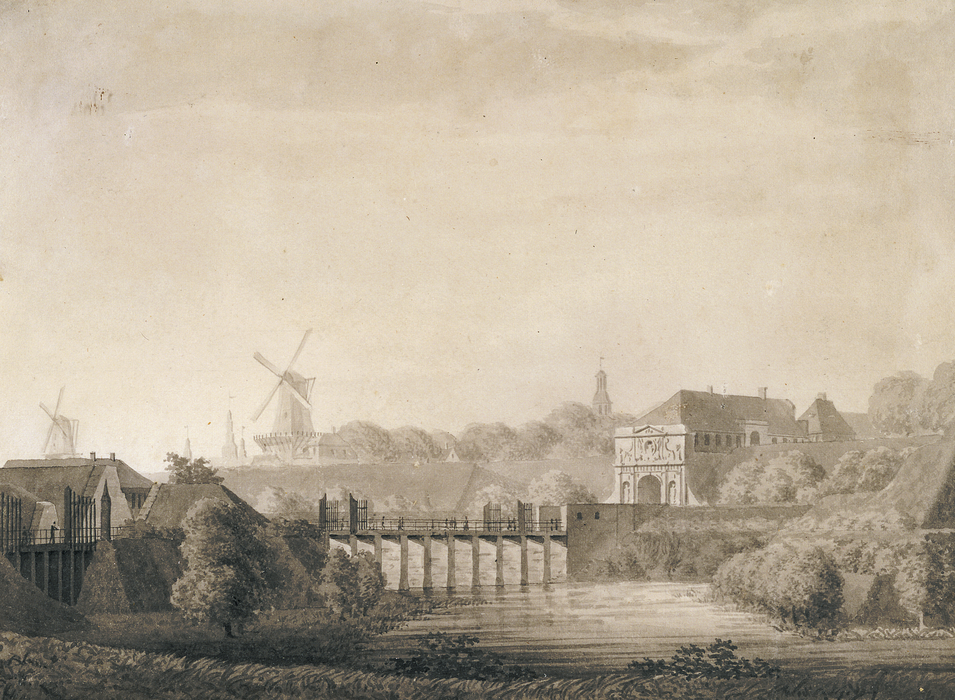
Copenhagen's North Gate viewed from the outside in 1831

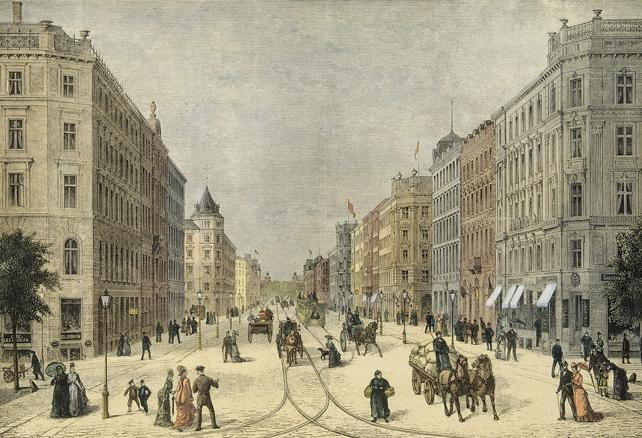
The extended Frederiksborggade in 1878

The street section from today's Kultorvet to Nørre Voldgade was until 15541. called Spitaliestrædet.

The current street name was introduced in the form Frederiksborger Gade in connection with the move of the city's North Gate was moved to the northern end of the street from its old position a little further to the west at the end of Nørregade. The new name referred to Frederiksborg Castle in North Zealand which was reached through the gate.

All buildings along the street was destroyed in the Copenhagen Fire of 1728. They were soon rebuilt but the southernmost part of the street disappeared with the establishment of the new marketplace Kultorvet.

Frederiksborggade was extended when Copenhagen's fortifications were decommissioned in the 1850s. The North Gate was demolished and the extended street opened to traffic on 18 November 1856. The intersection with Nørre Farimagsgade became the busiest junction in Copenhagen and Denmark's first automatic traffic lights were installed at the site on 23 November 1928. The southern portion of the street was pedestrianized together with Kultorvet and Købmagergade in the 1960s.

== Notable buildings and residents ==
The Historicist building on the corner of Frederiksborggade was designed by Valdemar Ingemann and is from 1895. It was originally topped by a tall spire but it was dismantled after a few years

The building at No. 11 was built for Landmandsbanken to design by Hermann Baagøe Storck in 1881–83. It contained a Danske Bank branch until 2015. The building at the southeastern corner with Nørre Voldgade (Frederiksborggade 14 / Nørre Voldgade 88= was built by Frederik Lecy for the company Carl Holten in 1898. It now contains a Nordea branch in the ground floor.

== Public art ==
Am Art Deco-style stone pillar designed by Peder Vilhelm Jensen-Klint marks the point where Copenhagen's North Gate was once located. Similar stone pillars mark the points where the East Gate, West Gate and Amager Gate were once situated.

== See also ==
- Frederiksborgvej, Copenhagen
