= Princess Louisa =

Princess Louisa may refer to:

== People ==
- Louisa Maria Stuart (1692–1712), daughter of James II, King of England and English and Scottish princess
- Louise of Great Britain (1724–1751), queen consort of Denmark and British princess by birth, originally called Louisa
- Princess Louisa of Great Britain (1749–1768), granddaughter of George II, King of Great Britain
- Princess Louise, Duchess of Argyll (1848–1939), daughter of Victoria, Queen of the United Kingdom who was christened as Louisa Caroline Alberta

== Places ==
- Princess Louisa Inlet, Canada
- Princess Louisa Marine Provincial Park, Canada

== See also ==
- Luísa de Bragança, Duchess of Cadaval (1679–1732), daughter of Peter II, King of Portugal
- Princess Maria Luisa Carlota of Parma (1802–1857), daughter of Louis I, King of Etruria
- Princess Louise (disambiguation)
- Queen Louise (disambiguation)
- Louisa (disambiguation)
