= Vilhelm Petersen =

Danish architect

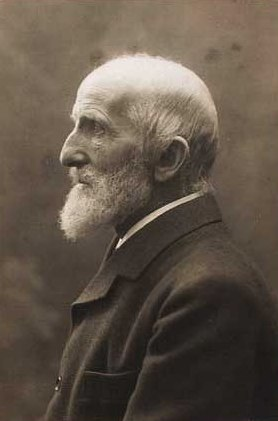
- Vilhelm Petersen
- Born: 5 April 1830; Copenhagen, Denmark
- Died: 3 July 1913 (aged 83); Frederiksberg, Denmark
- Education: Royal Danish Academy of Fine Arts
- Occupation: Architect
- Awards: C. F. Hansen Medal
- Buildings: Søtorvet housing estate

Vilhelm Valdemar Petersen (5 April 1830 – 3 July 1913) was a Danish architect who became Royal Building Inspector from 1892 until his death. He was the father of architect Knud Arne Petersen.

== Biography ==
Vilhelm Petersen was born in Copenhagen in 1830. He was admitted to the Art Academy in 1843, when just 13 years old, where he initially studied decorative arts. Later he turned to architecture and became a student of Gustav Friedrich Hetsch for whom he also worked as an assistant and draughtsman. For a few years he also apprenticed as a mason to acquire practical knowledge of the building trade. In 1856, he won the Academy's Honorary Medal and in 1860 its large gold medal which was accompanied by a four-year travel scholarship which brought him to Germany, the Netherlands, France and Italy.

Back in Denmark, he became a member of the Art Academy in 1866 and he served as Building Inspector in Copenhagen from 1869 until 1874. He became a titular professor at the Art Academy and from 1887 until 1911 was a member of the Academy Council. In 1892 he received appointment as Royal Building Inspector, an office he held until his death.

== Works ==
Vilhelm Petersen's earliest independent works include a new Custom House and a building for the Royal Nautical Charts Archive and Meteorological Institute, both completed at Nordre Toldbod in Copenhagen in 1873. Another early work was a large residential development, Søtorvet, which he designed for the Copenhagen Building Company in collaboration with Ferdinand Vilhelm Jensen and under supervision of Ferdinand Meldahl. It was built on a prominent location overlooking The Copenhagen Lakes between 1873 and 1876 and relied on inspiration from Paris. His new Town Hall and Jailhouse in Roskilde was completed in 1878.

His building for the Royal Danish Academy of Sciences and Letters at Dantes Plads in Copenhagen, built between 1894 and 1898 in Renaissance Revival style, is considered his most successful work. Other late commissions include hospitals, such as the new building for Almindeligt Hospital (1885–92), a few churches and custom houses in Frederiksværk (1895–96), Rønne (1896–97) and Nykøbing Falster.

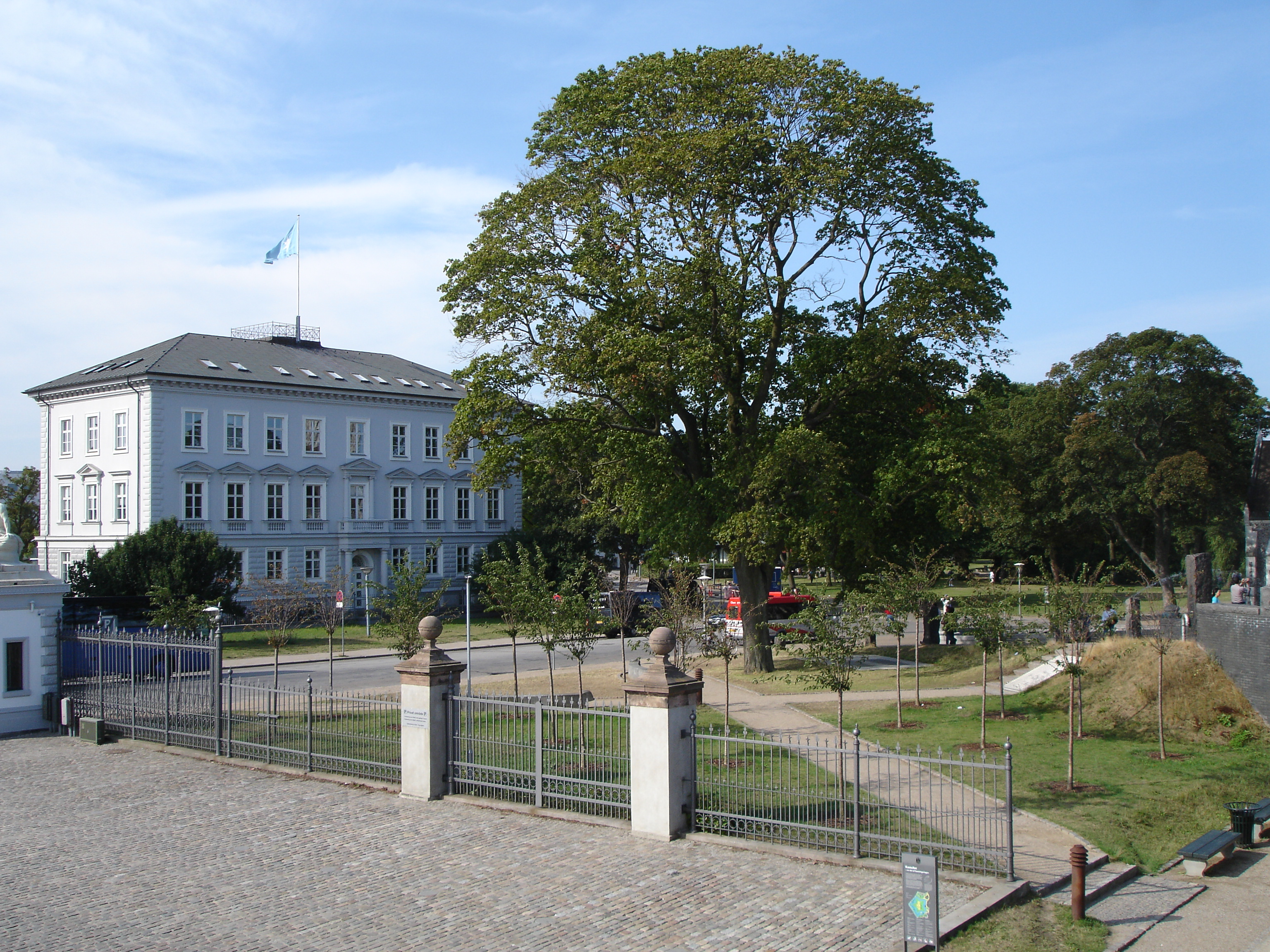
Royal Nautical Charts Archive (1873)

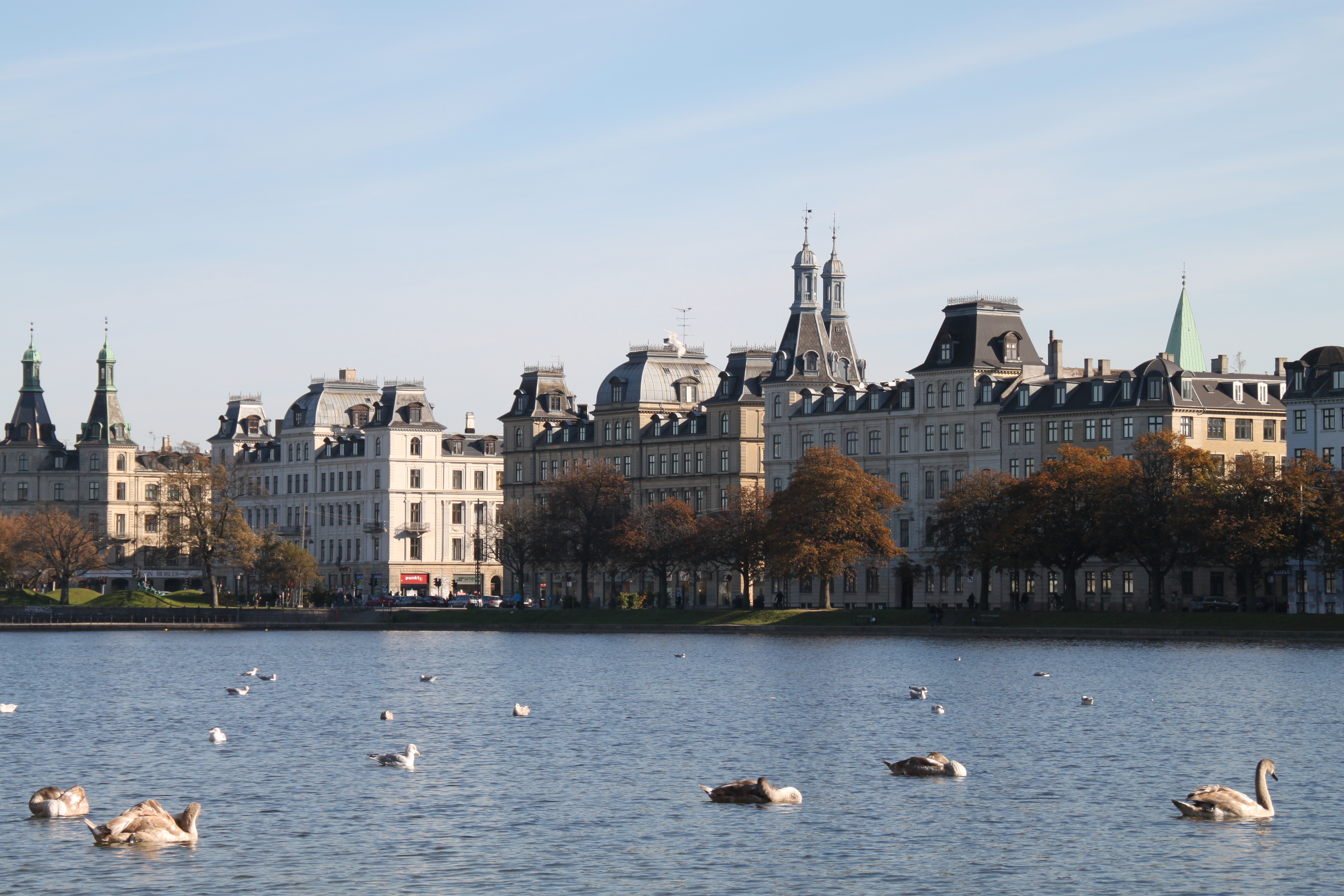
Søtorvet, Copenhagen (1876)

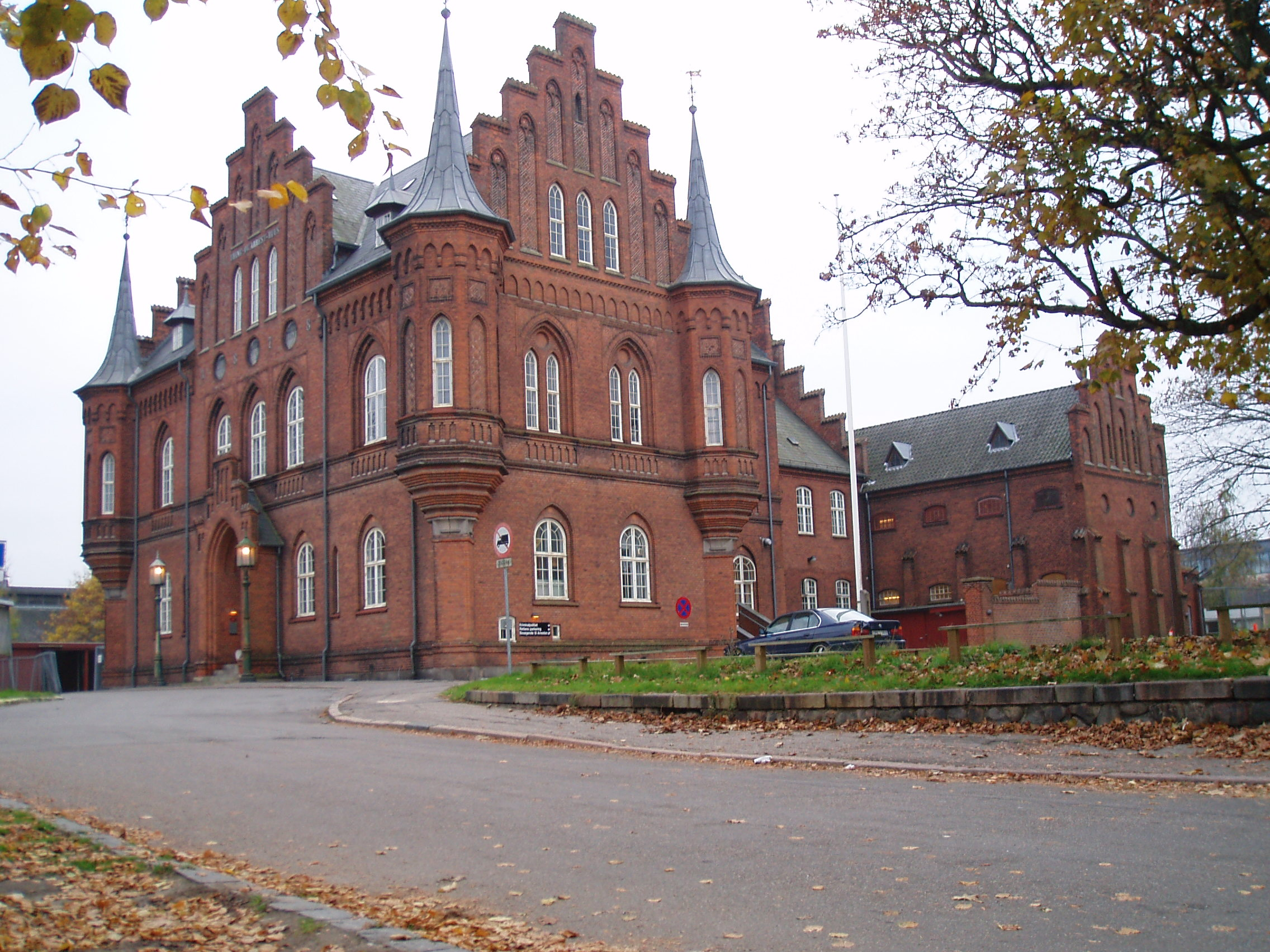
Town Hall, Roskilde (1878)

== See also ==
- Architecture of Denmark
