= Louise of Sweden (disambiguation) =

Louise of Sweden (1851–1926) was the queen consort of Frederick VIII, King of Denmark and daughter of Charles XV, King of Sweden.

Louise of Sweden (Swedish: Louisa, Lovisa, and Ludvika) may also refer to:

- Queen Louise of Sweden (disambiguation), various queen consorts
- Princess Louise Hedvig of Sweden (1797), daughter of King Charles XIII
- Princess Louise Amelie of Baden (1811–1854), Swedish princess by marriage to Gustav, Prince of Vasa

== See also ==
- Louisa Ulrika of Prussia (1720–1782), queen consort of King Adolf Frederick
- Princess Louise (disambiguation)
- Queen Louise (disambiguation)
