= Ferdinand Vilhelm Jensen =

Danish architect (1837–1890)

Ferdinand Vilhelm Jensen (27 March 1837 – 15 April 1890) was a Danish Historicist architect.

== Biography ==
Jensen was born in Copenhagen on 27 March 1837. He enrolled at the Royal Danish Academy of Fine Arts in 1854, winning the Academy's small silver medal in 1859, the large silver medal in 1860 and finally the small gold medal in 1869.

Jensen's first commissions were the Methodist Jerusalem Church in Copenhagen and several private residential buildings. In the 1870s, he collaborated with architect Vilhelm Petersen (1830–1913) on several projects including Søtorvet for the Copenhagen Building Company (Det Kjøbenhavnske Bygge-Selskab) . In the beginning of the 1860s, he taught at Copenhagen Technical College and he was building inspector in Frederiksberg from 1869–74. In 1867, he moved to Hamburg where he designed the gymnasium (Hansehalle) and a number of private homes. In 1882, he returned to Copenhagen where he continued his work for a few years. He died on 15 April 1890 and is buried in Solbjerg Cemetery.

== Selected works ==
- Jerusalem Church, Rigensgade, Copenhagen )1863)
- Brønnum House, Kongens Nytorv, Copenhagen (1866)
- Nivaagaard, Nivå (1880–81)
- Kingosg. 2/Vesterbrogade 106B, Copenhagen (1884–86)
- Bredgade 63-65 (1886–87)
- Abel Cathrinesgade 5-11, Copenhagen (1887–88)
- Petersborg, Trianglen, Copenhagen (1888–90)
- Eriksgade 7-9, 11-13, 15,
- Eskildsgade 33-35, 37, Halmtorvet 44 (1888–90)
- Hansehalle, Hamburg, Germany

With Vilhelm Petersen

- Søtorvet, Copenhagen
- Fr.borggade 43, 54
- Gothersgade 175, 160, Copenhagen
- Nørre Søgade 5-7, Copenhagen
- Vendersgade 33, 28, Copenhagen
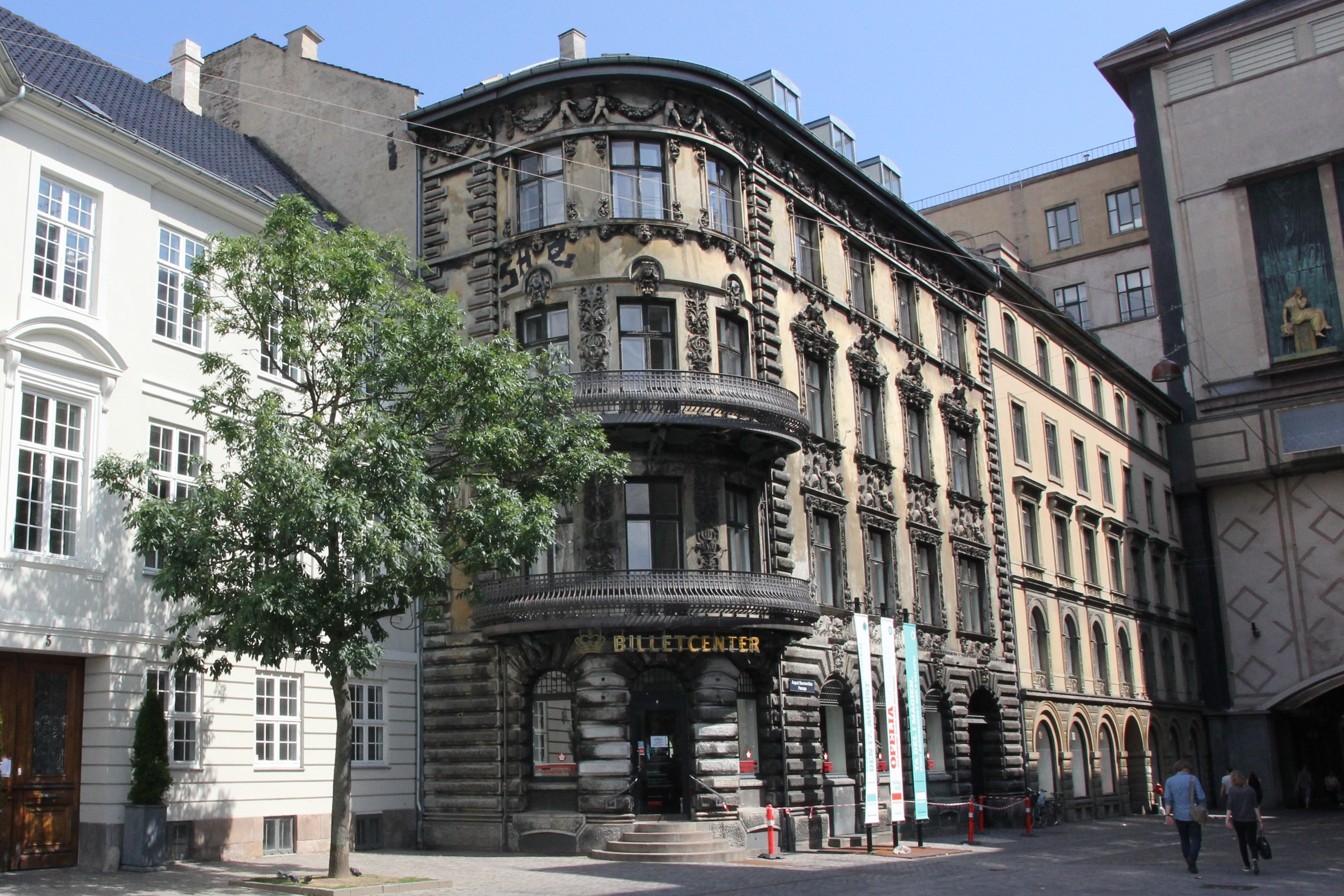
Brønnum House

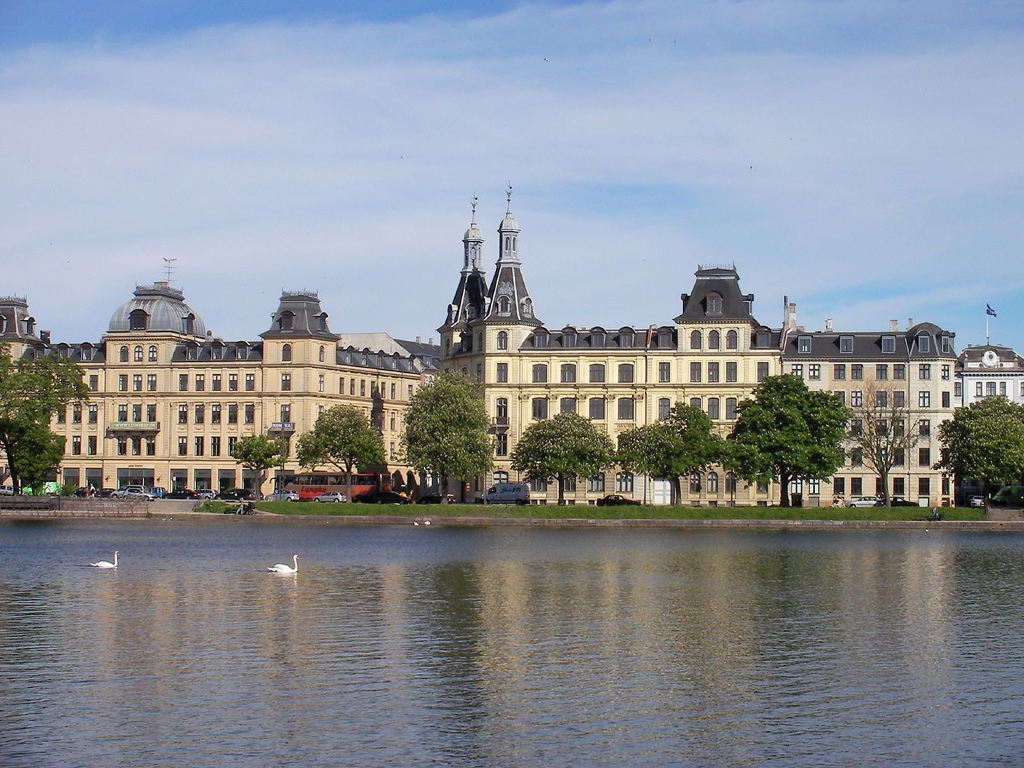
Søtorvet

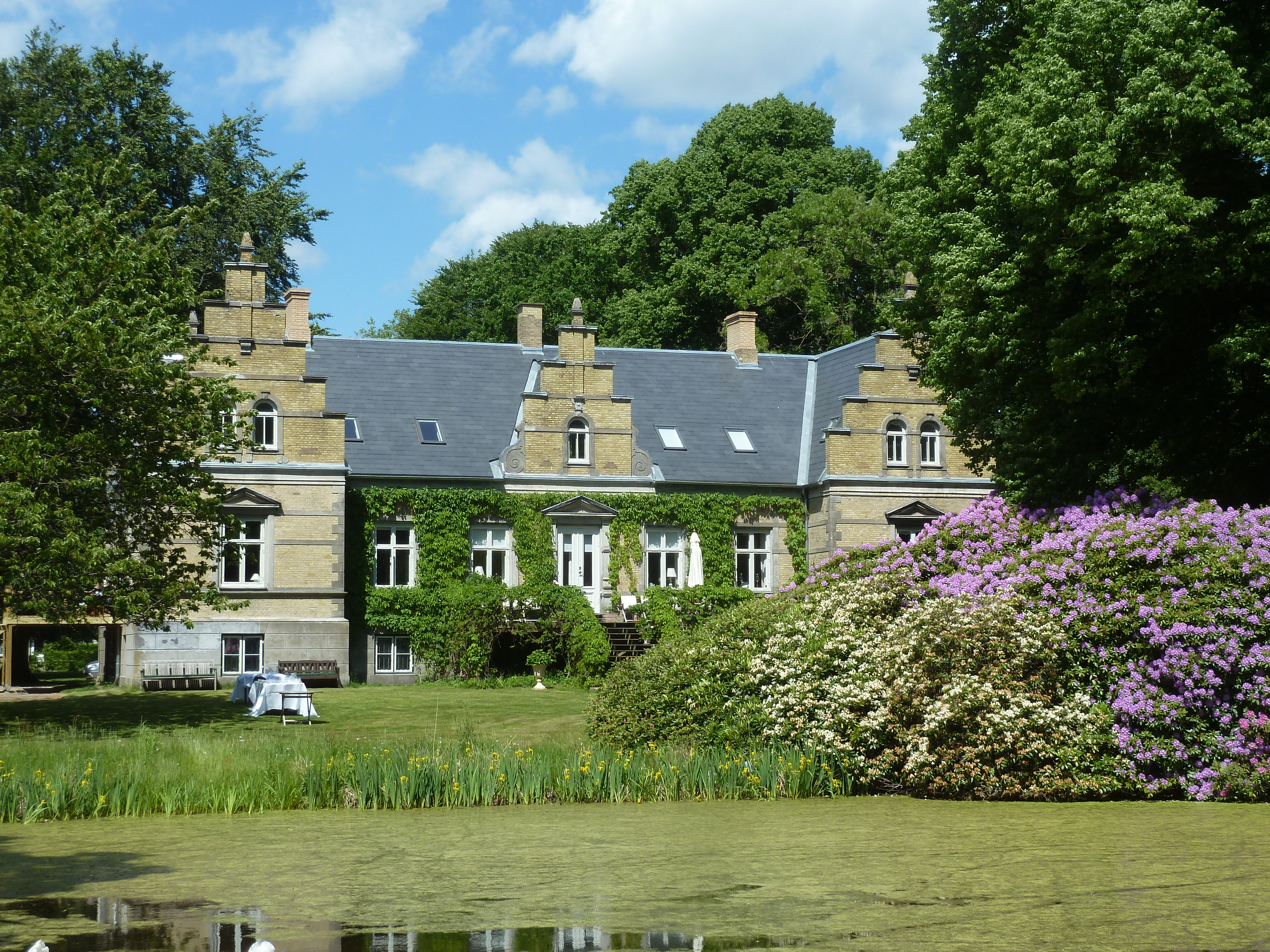
Nivaagaard

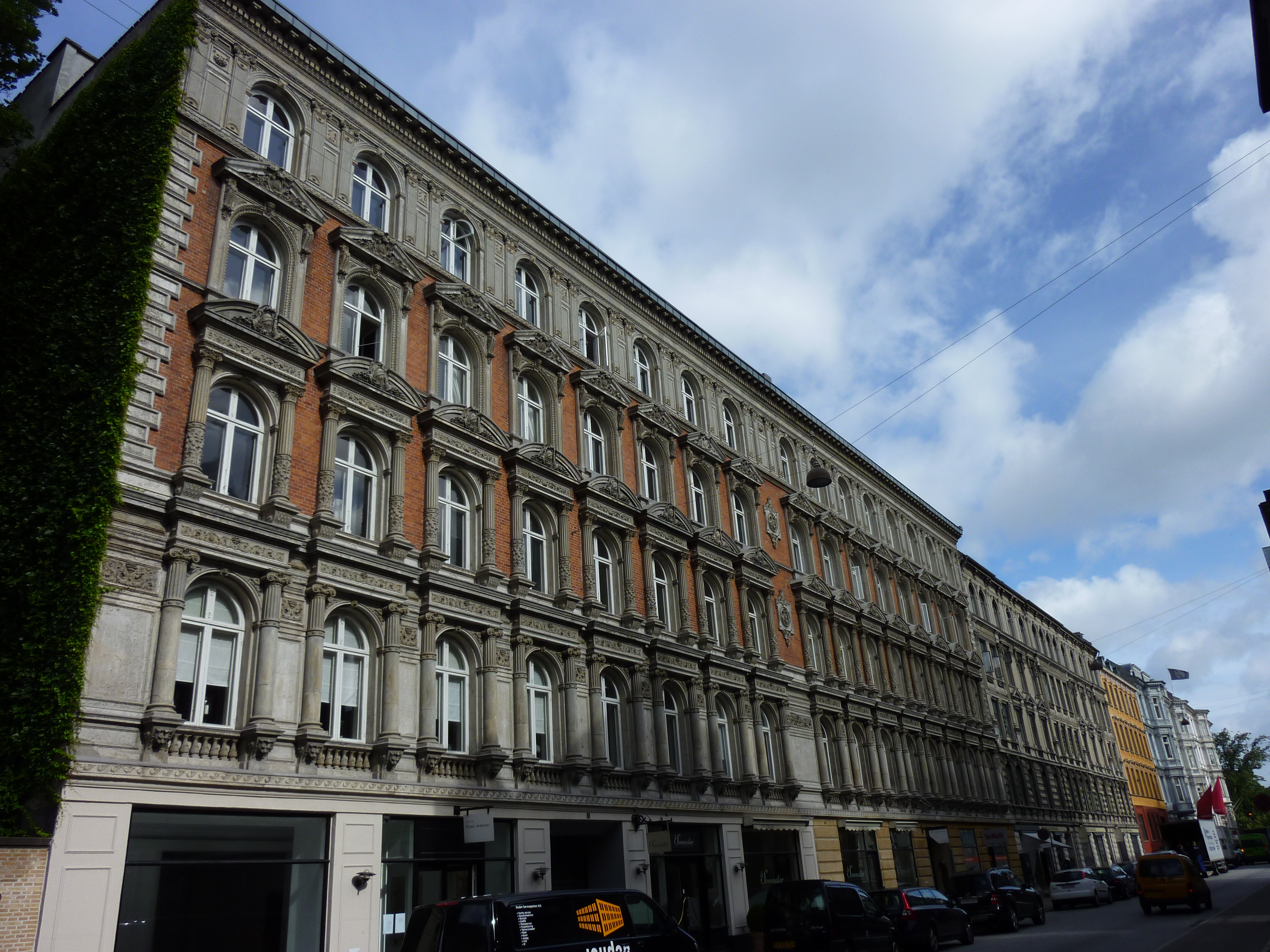
Bredgade 63–65
