= Louise of Saxe-Meiningen =

Princess Louise of Saxe-Meiningen may refer to:

- Princess Louise of Saxe-Meiningen (1752–1805), daughter of Anton Ulrich, Duke of Saxe-Meiningen
- Princess Louise of Saxe-Meiningen (1899–1985), daughter of Prince Friedrich of Saxe-Meiningen

== See also ==
- Princess Louise (disambiguation)
