= Princess Louise of Schleswig-Holstein =

Princess Louise of Schleswig-Holstein may refer to:

- Louise of Hesse-Kassel (1817–1898), spouse of Prince Christian of Schleswig-Holstein-Sonderburg-Glücksburg (later Christian IX, King of Denmark)
- Princess Louise of Schleswig-Holstein-Sonderburg-Glücksburg (1858–1936), daughter of Friedrich, Duke of Schleswig-Holstein-Sonderburg-Glücksburg
- Princess Louise Sophie of Schleswig-Holstein-Sonderburg-Augustenburg (1866–1952), daughter of Frederick VIII, Duke of Schleswig-Holstein

== See also ==
- Countess Louise Sophie Danneskiold-Samsøe (1796–1867), duchess consort of Christian August II, Duke of Schleswig-Holstein-Sonderburg-Augustenburg
- Princess Marie Louise of Schleswig-Holstein (1872–1956), daughter of Prince Christian of Schleswig-Holstein
- Princess Louise (disambiguation)
