= Landgravine Louise of Hesse-Darmstadt =

Landgravine Louise of Hesse-Darmstadt may refer to:

- Landgravine Louise of Hesse-Darmstadt (1757–1830), daughter of Louis IX, Landgrave of Hesse-Darmstadt and grand duchess consort of Charles Augustus, Grand Duke of Saxe-Weimar-Eisenach
- Landgravine Louise of Hesse-Darmstadt (1761–1829), daughter of Prince George William of Hesse-Darmstadt and grand duchess consort of Louis I, Grand Duke of Hesse

== See also ==
- Louise of Hesse-Kassel (1817–1898), queen consort of Christian IX, King of Denmark
- Princess Louise (disambiguation)
