= Søtorvet =

Late 19th century residential development

Coordinates: 55.6861°N 12.5653°E

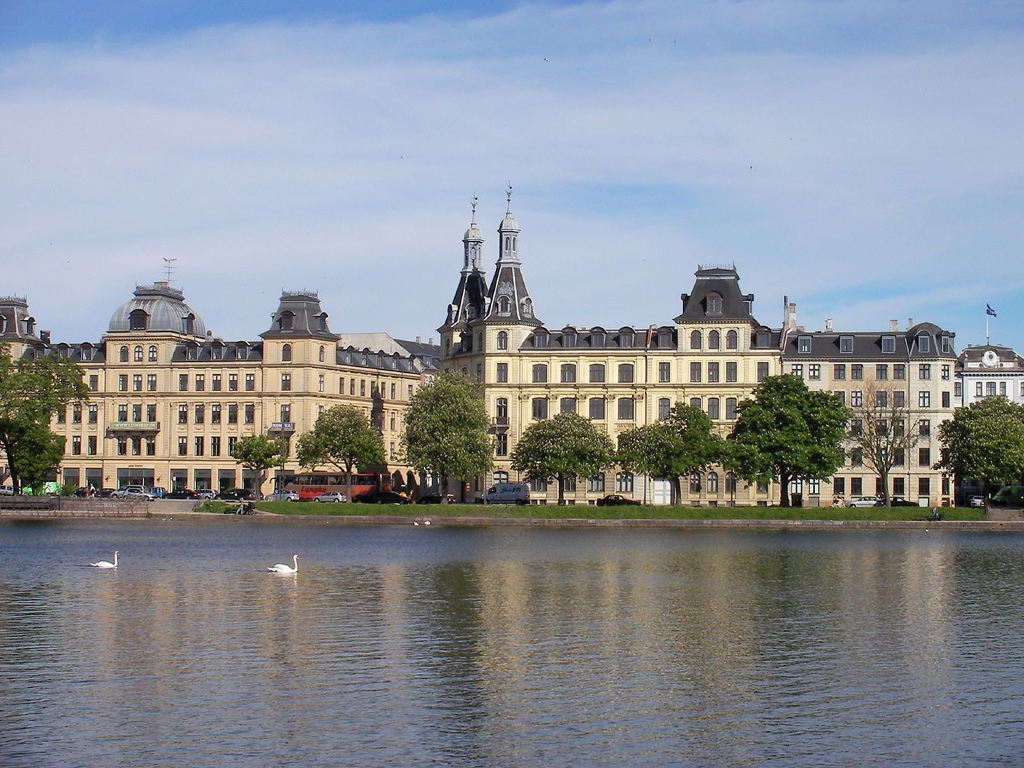
- Søtorvet seen from Nørrebro
- Interactive map of the Søtorvet area

General information
- Architectural style: Historicism (Châteauesque)
- Location: Copenhagen, Denmark
- Construction started: 1873
- Completed: 1875
- Client: Copenhagen Building Company

Design and construction
- Architects: Ferdinand Vilhelm Jensen; Vilhelm Petersen

Søtorvet (lit. 'The Lake Square') is an elegant late 19th century residential development facing The Lakes in Copenhagen, Denmark. It flanks the end of Frederiksborggade, where it turns into the Queen Louise Bridge, at the intersection with Øster and Nørre Søgade.

== History ==
=== Background ===
When Copenhagen was still a fortified city, Frederiksborggade, passing through the Northern City Gate, used to be one of the main roads leading in and out of town, taking travellers north toward Frederiksborg Castle. After the Northern City Gate was demolished in 1853 and a law definitively provided for the decommissioning of the fortifications in 1868, redevelopment of the land outside the gate began and the present day Nørrebro district emerged with Nørrebrogade, the continuation of Frederiksborggade on the other side of The Lakes, as its central artery.

=== Construction ===
The Søtorvet development was built from 1873 to 1875 by the Copenhagen Building Company, a real estate company founded the previous year by Carl Frederik Tietgen together with a circle of prominent citizens including Carlsberg-founder J. C. Jacobsen, manufacturer Lauritz Peter Holmblad, later Prime Minister Tage Reedtz-Thott, and later Speaker of the Danish Landsting Carl Christian Vilhelm Liebe.

The architects were Ferdinand Vilhelm Jensen and Vilhelm Petersen under supervision of Ferdinand Meldahl, one of the leading Danish architects of the period.

=== After the inauguration ===
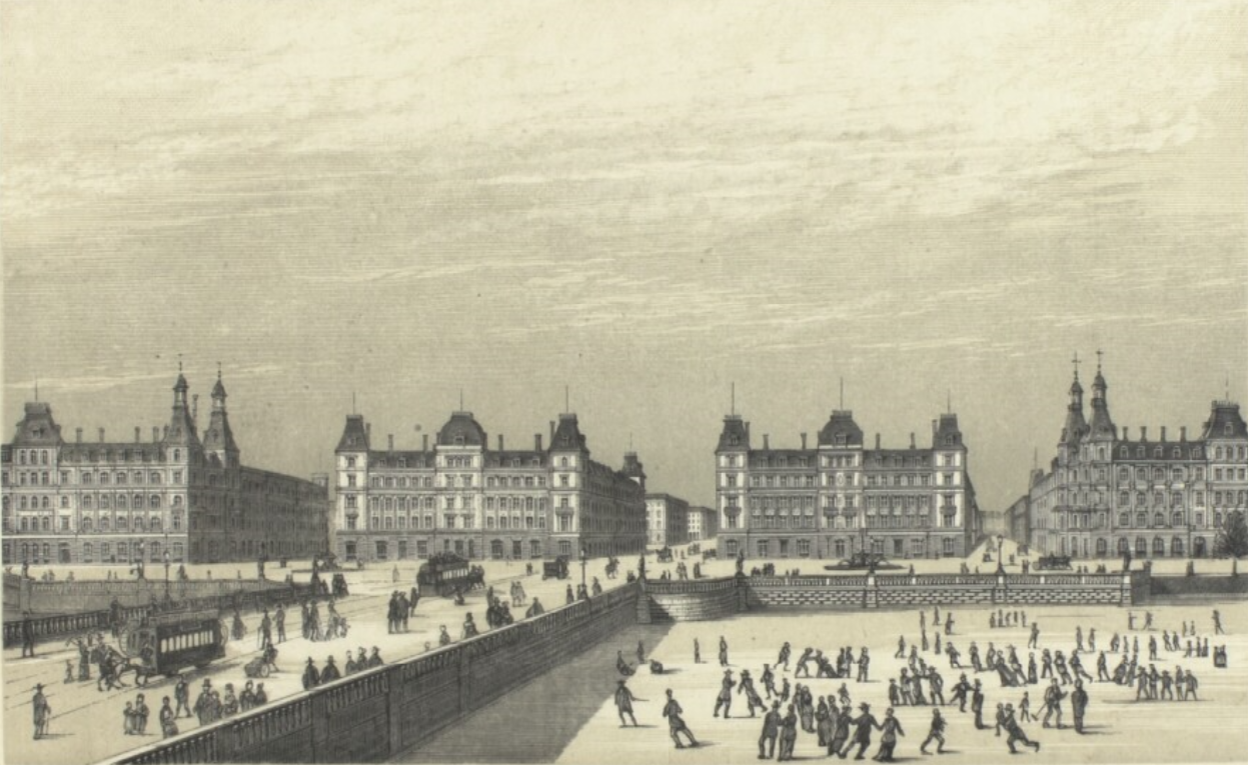
Søtorvet

When the buildings were completed, Johanne Luise Heiberg was one of the first residents.

At this point, the Queen Louise Bridge had still not been built. It was constructed a decade later to the design of Vilhelm Dahlerup, another leading architect of the time.

In about 1900, the Café de la Reine opened at Søtorvet 2, further contributing to the French ambiance of the locale. It had outdoor service under a roof and was therefore nicknamed Café la' det regne ("Café let it rain"), a play on how the French name sounds in Danish. In the 1930s, the café became a hangout for poets such as Sigfred Pedersen and Otto Gelsted who would often recite their poems standing on the tables. Niels Clemmensen sat behind the piano. When Nazi Germany occupied Denmark in 1940, the café closed.

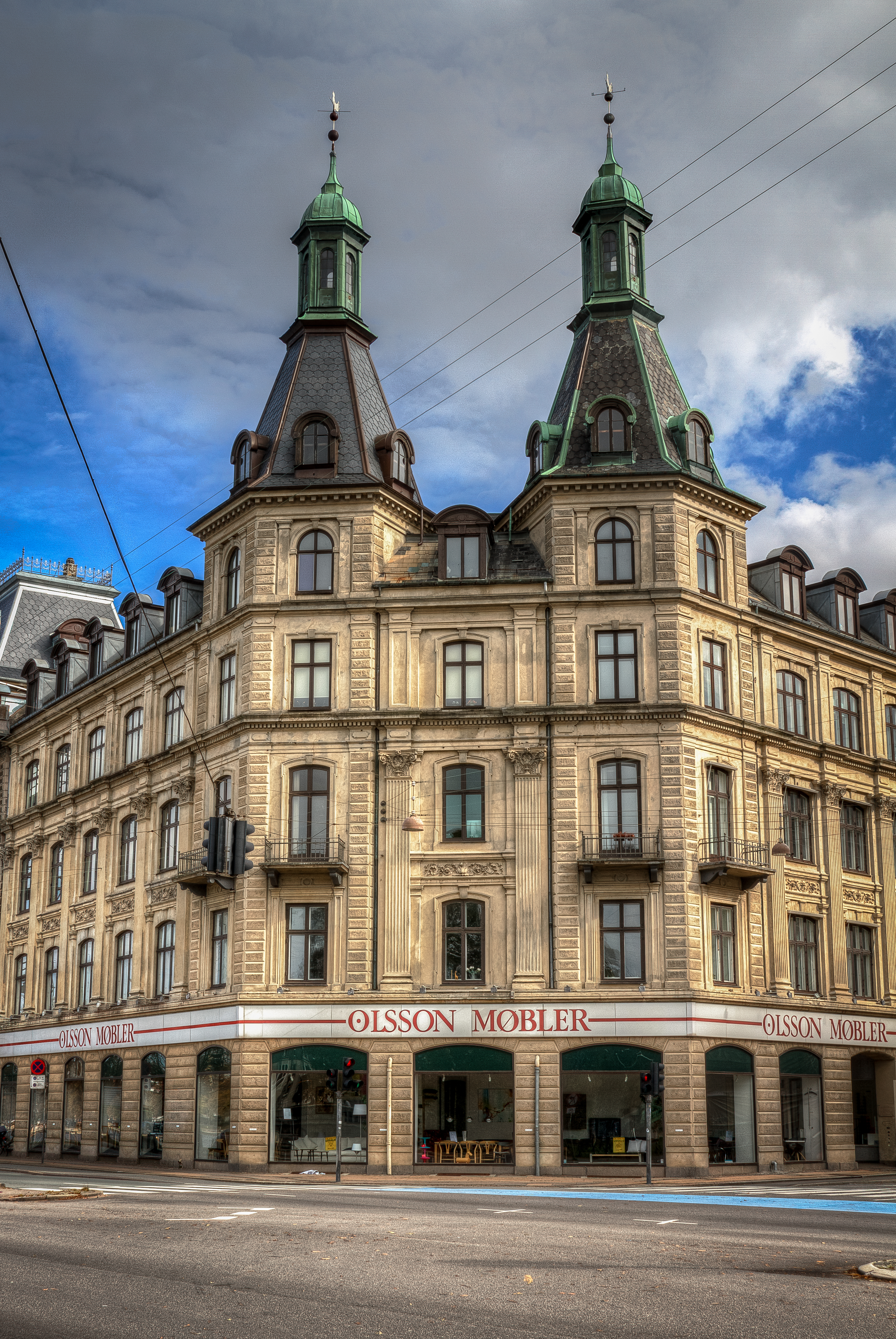
The corner of Vendersgade and Nørre Søgade

== Architecture ==
Søtorvet stands as a gateway to the Inner City, coming from Nørrebro, but was not planned as such. Supposedly it aggravated Meldahl that a development of similar prominence was never built on the Nørrebro end of the bridge. The development consists of four buildings, symmetrically arranged with the two buildings on one side of Frederiksborggade mirroring the two on the other side. Named Gothersgade and Venthersgade, a reference to the Goths and the Wends in the title King of the Goths and the Wends which was used by Danish kings from the 14th century until 1972, the two streets separating the buildings on each their side of Frederiksborggade repeat the symmetry.

The design of the buildings in the 19th-century Neo-Renaissance style was inspired by the architecture of French castles and Haussmann's developments in Paris. The buildings have rich stucco ornamentation and are topped with towers and spires.

== Statury ==
There are two bronze statues on the square, the Tiber and the Nile which are replicas of two 1st century statues discovered during excavations in Rome in the 16th century. They were donated by Carl Jacobsen's Albertina Trust.

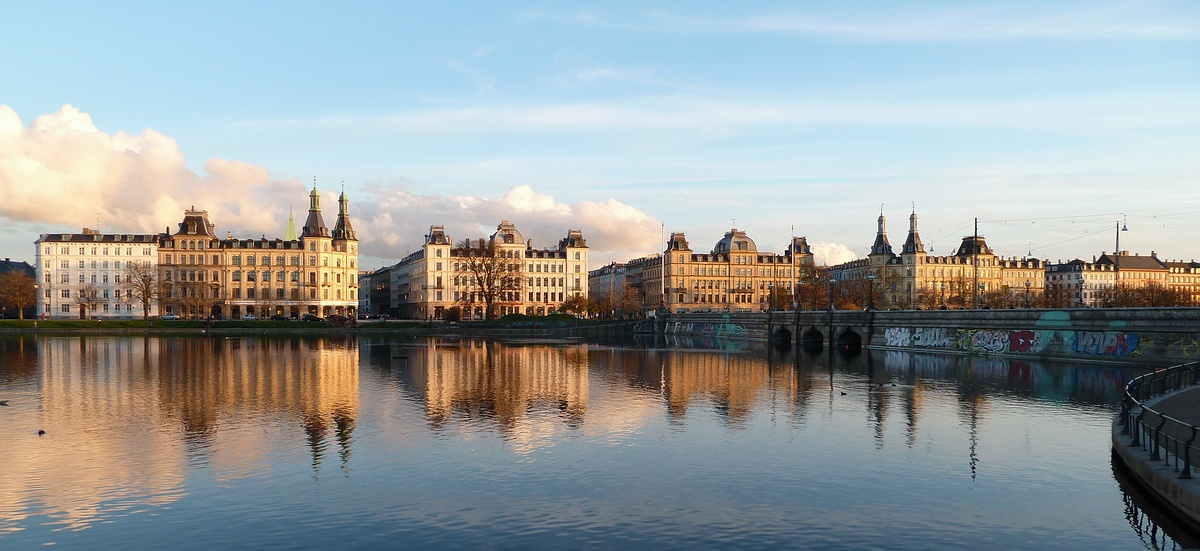
Søtorvet seen from across the lake with the Queen Louise Bridge on the right

== See also ==
- Circus Building, Copenhagen
- Søgade, Copenhagen
