= Königin Luise (disambiguation) =

Königin Luise (Louise of Mecklenburg-Strelitz, 1776–1810) was the queen consort of Prussia by marriage to Frederick William III, King of Prussia.

Königin Luise may also refer to:

- SS Königin Luise, various ships
- Königin Luise, a fictional German gunboat in The African Queen (novel) and the novel's film adaptation
- Königin-Luise-Schule, a former girls' school in Königsberg

== See also ==
- Louise, Queen of Prussia (film), a German film directed by Carl Froelich
- Queen Louise (1927 film), a silent German film directed by Karl Grune
- Queen Louise (1957 film), a West German film directed by Wolfgang Liebeneiner
- Queen Louise League (German: Königin-Luise-Bund), a 20th-century German pro-monarchy organization
- Queen Louise (disambiguation)
