= Queen Louise of Sweden =

Queen Louise of Sweden may refer to:

- Louise of the Netherlands (1828–1871), consort of King Charles XV and daughter of Prince Frederick of the Netherlands
- Louise Mountbatten (1889–1965), consort of King Gustaf VI Adolf and daughter of Prince Louis of Battenberg

== See also ==
- Louisa Ulrika of Prussia (1720–1782), consort of King Adolf Frederick and daughter of Frederick William I, King in Prussia
- Louise of Sweden (disambiguation)
  - Louise of Sweden (1851–1926), consort of Frederick VIII, King of Denmark and daughter of King Charles XV
- Queen Louise (disambiguation)
