= Tycho Brahe Planetarium =

Planetarium and IMAX cinema in Copenhagen, Denmark

Coordinates: 55°40′28″N 12°33′29″E

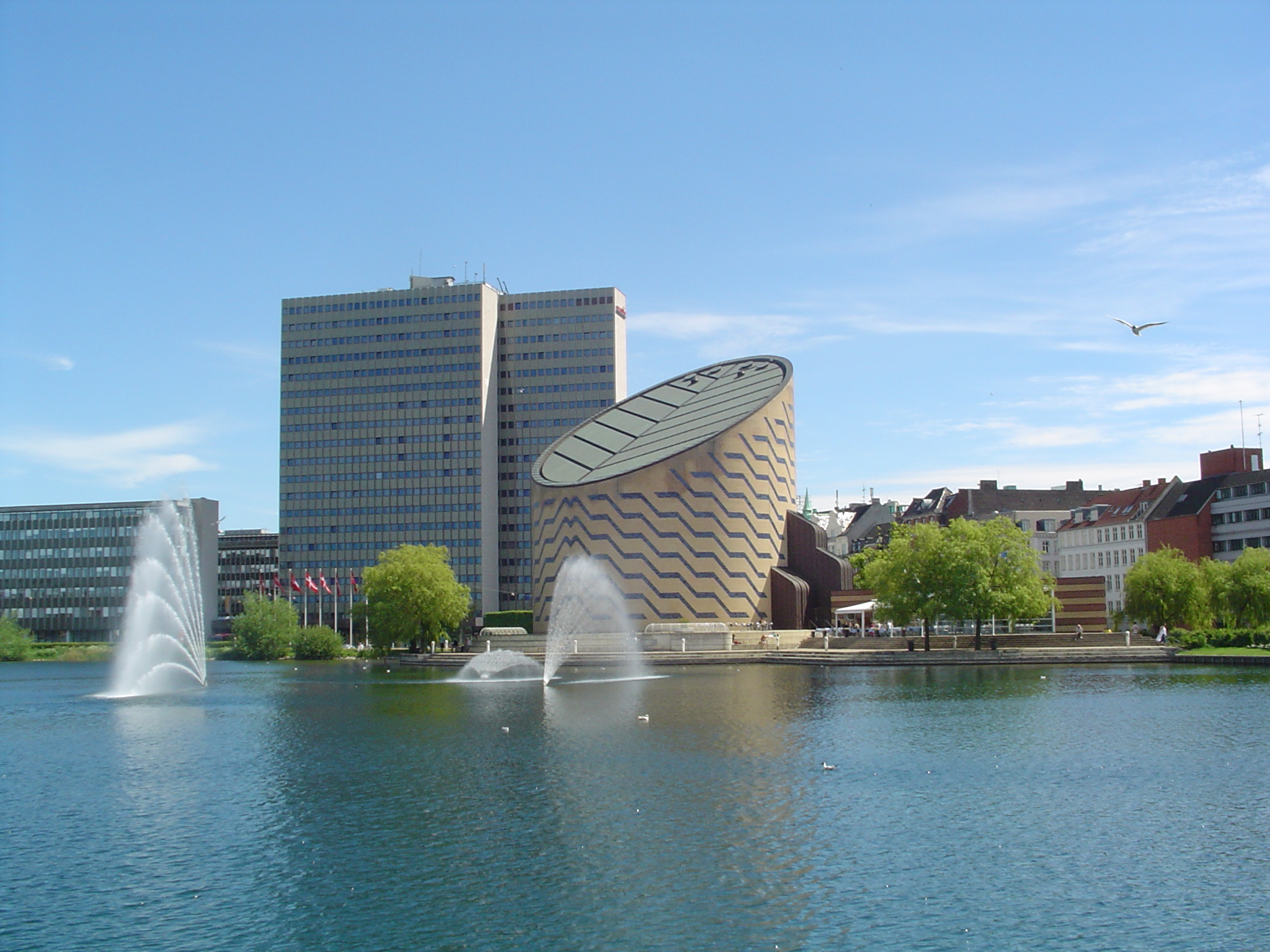
Planetarium

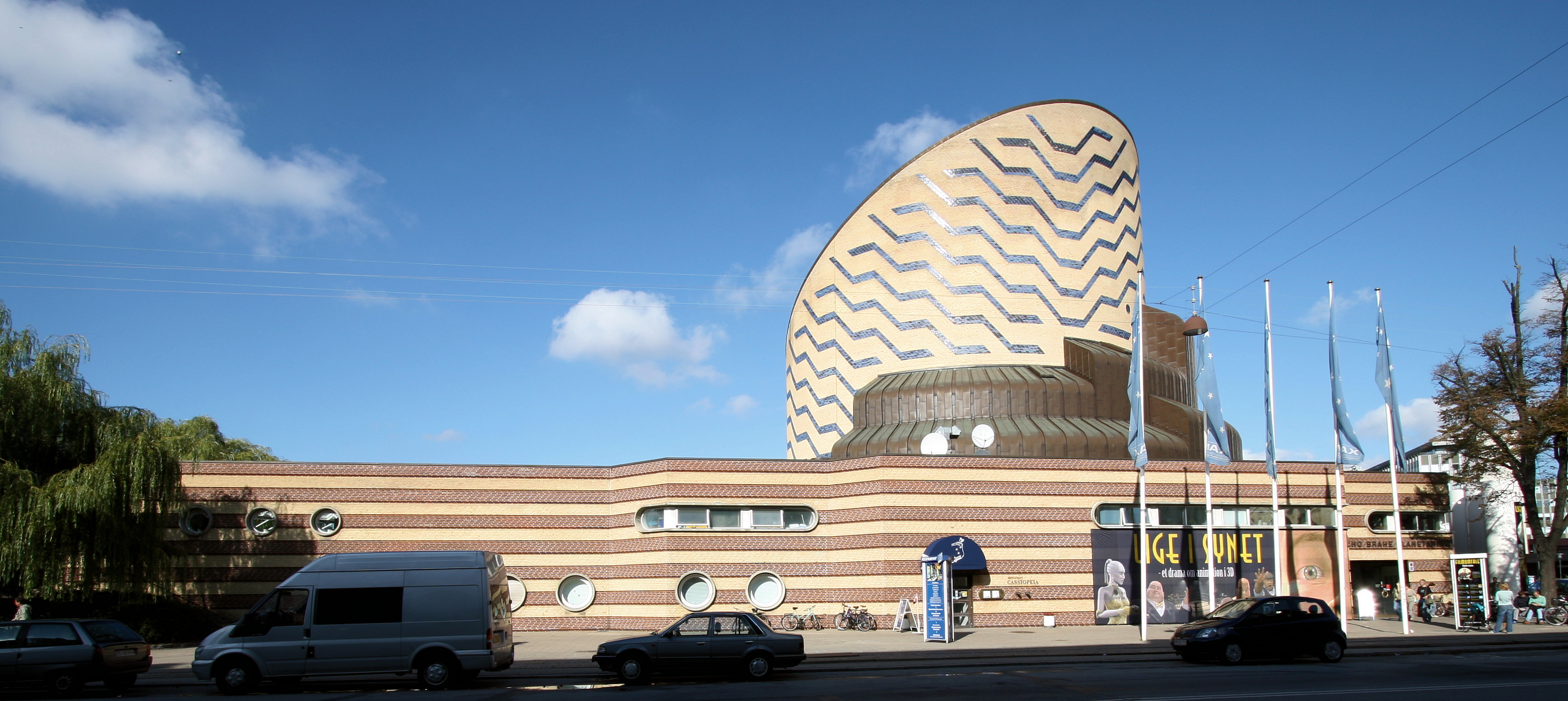
Planetarium

Planetarium (formerly Tycho Brahe Planetarium) is located at the southern end of the lake Skt. Jørgens Sø in Copenhagen, Denmark. It was designed by MAA Knud Munk (1936–2016) and opened on November 1, 1989.

== History ==
The planetarium is built where the Saltlageret theater was previously located. The foundation stone was placed on February 22, 1988, and the planetarium opened on November 1, 1989. The financial basis for building the planetarium was a 50,000,000 DKK donation by the foundation Bodil Pedersen Fonden to the foundation Uraniafonden, which administered the construction of the planetarium. Since 1989, the Bodil Pedersen Fonden has also awarded the annual Tycho Brahe Medaljen.

== Exhibition ==
The exhibition underwent a major renovation in 2017, and the new exhibition Cosmos (formerly Made in Space) opened in February 2018. The exhibition was made in collaboration with Tony-winning, London based designers, 59 Productions, and was made on a donation from the foundation A.P. Møller Fonden. The exhibition is an interactive and including exhibition, telling the story of how all of the elements that make up a human originally came from space.

Planetarium is home to the largest lunar rock that can be seen outside the US. Weighing more than 200 grams, it was brought back to Earth by the crew on the Apollo 17 mission in 1972.

In the Dome Theatre there are shows every day. The centre also screens films. Most are narrated to Danish, but it is possible to have English narration in headphones. During summertime there are normally a few shows in English every day. There are also two smaller exhibitions. One about the moon and the other about Saturn's rings.
