= Lake Pavilion, Copenhagen =

Building in Copenhagen, Denmark

Coordinates: 55°40′55″N 12°33′33″E

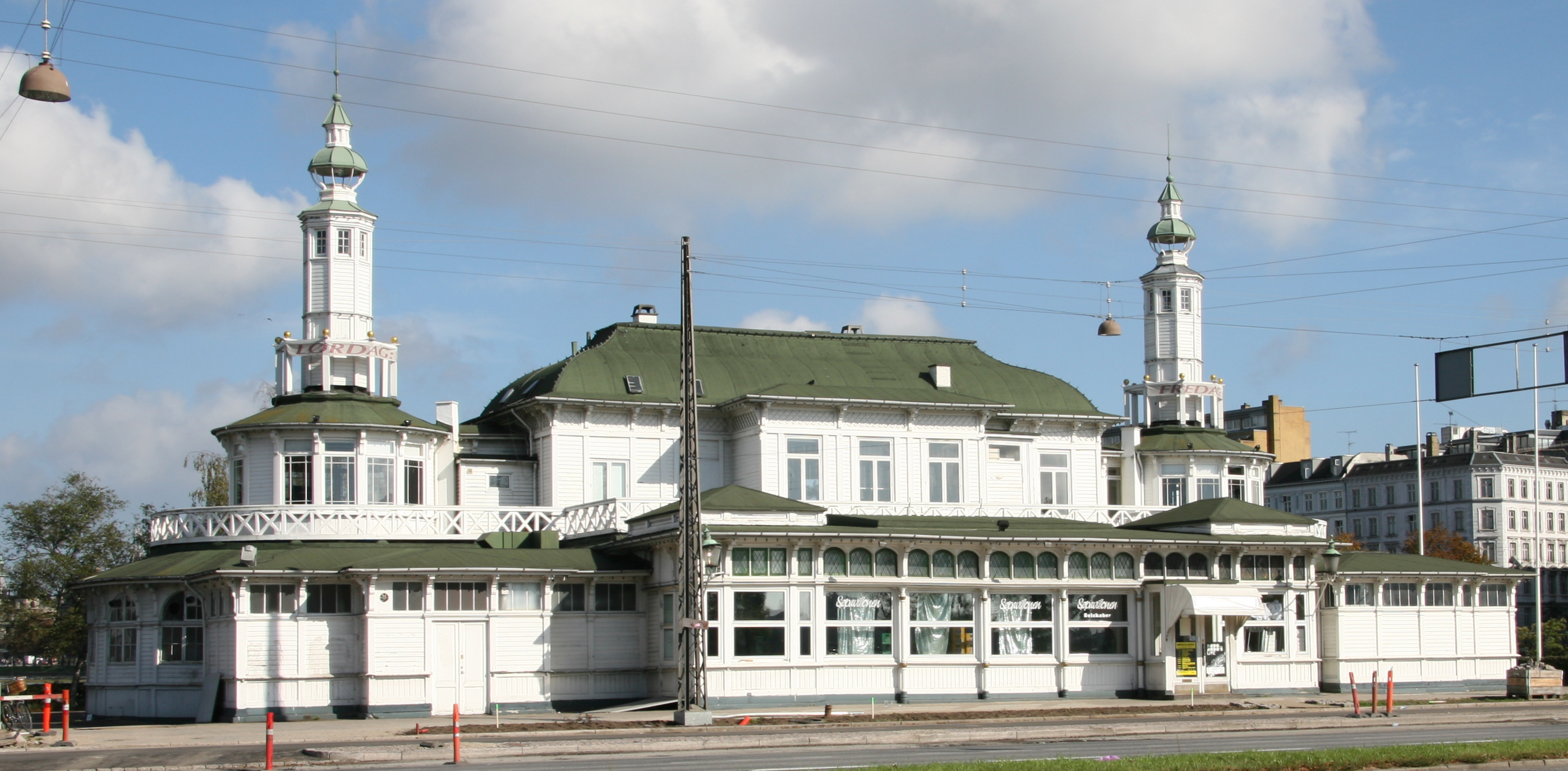
The Lake Pavilion

The Lake Pavilion (Danish: Søpavillonen) is a historic building at The Lakes in central Copenhagen, Denmark. Situated on the north side of Gyldenløvesgade, on the embankment that separates Peblinge Lake and Sankt Jørgens Lake, it was completed in 1895 to a Historicist design by Vilhelm Dahlerup and listed in 1984.

== History ==
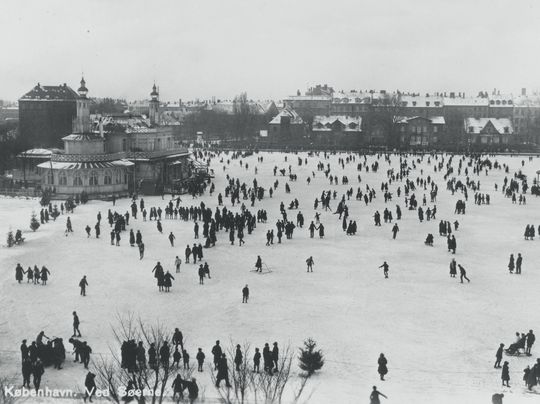
Ice skaters on Peblinge Lake in the 1910s

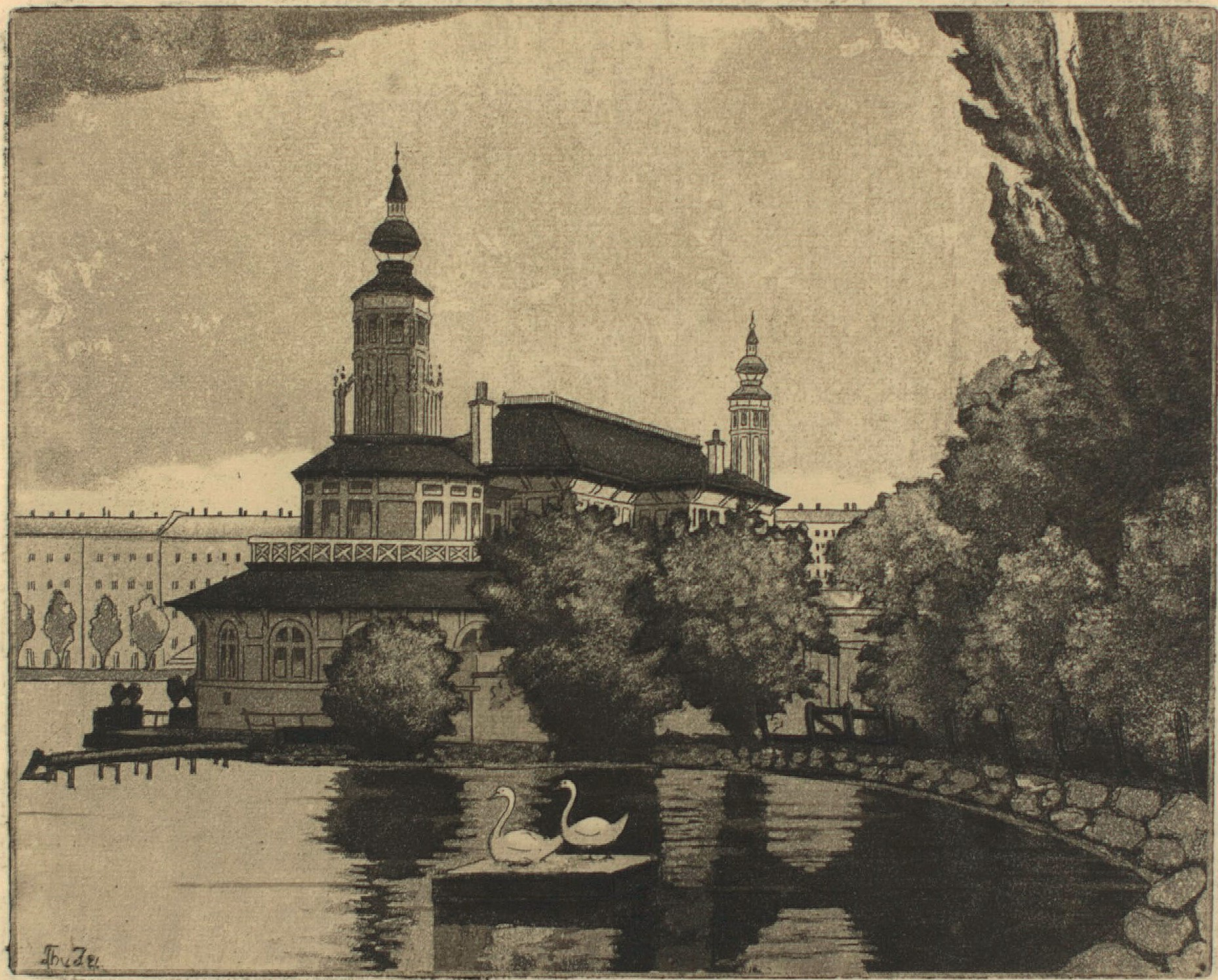
The Lake Pavilion depicted by Thorvald Jørgensen

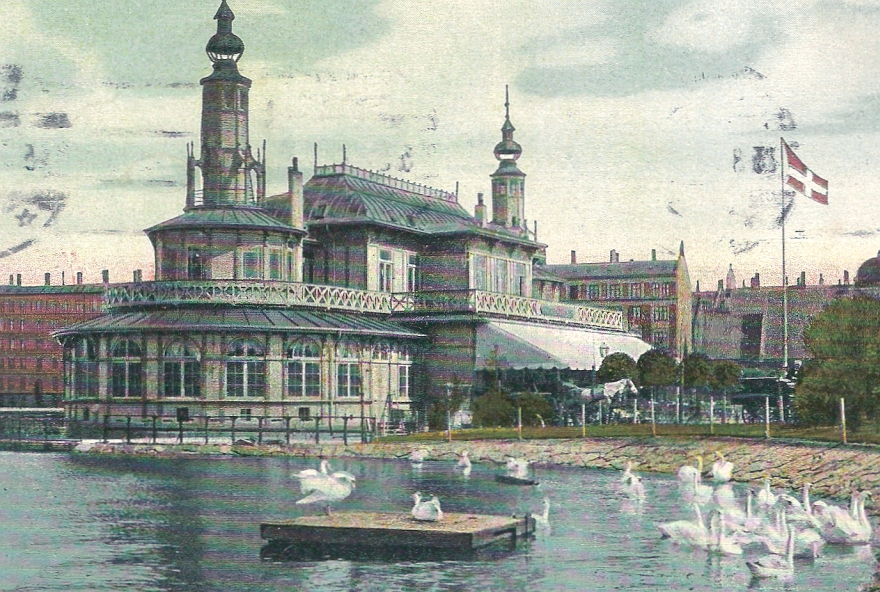
The Lake Pavilion

The Lake Pavilion was built for the Copenhagen Ice Skating Club, whose members had used The Lakes for ice skating during the winter months since the club's foundation in 1870. They first used Sortedam Lake but from 1886 also Peblinge Lake.

In 1965 it was sold to Oscar Davidsen a restaurateur specializing in Smørrebrød. The restaurant moved to new premises in Store Kongensgade in 1974. The architect Jørn Utzon created a design proposal for a swimming centre at the site in 1979 but the project was never realized. The building was instead purchased by the publicist Palle Fogtdal and for a while served as a meeting place for The Adventurers' Club of Denmark. The building has later been a venue for entertainment and music clubs.

== Today ==
The building is currently being used as a nightclub under its original name; Søpavillonen - or simply SØ - and as a restaurant called Babylon. To Copenhagen residents, however, it is commonly referred to as klamydiaslottet (the clamydia castle). The venue is owned and operated by the nightclub duo Simon & Simon.
