= Prince Louis =

Prince Louis may refer to:

== French princes ==
=== Princes of Condé ===
- Louis I, Prince of Condé (1530–1569), prominent Huguenot leader and general, the founder of the House of Condé
- Louis, Grand Condé (1621–1686), French general
- Louis III, Prince of Condé (1668–1710) prince du sang at the French court of Louis XIV
- Louis Joseph, Prince of Condé (1736–1818), Prince du sang
- Louis Henri, Prince of Condé (1756 - 1830), brother-in-law of Philippe Égalité
- Louis Henri, Duke of Bourbon (1692–1740), prime minister to his kinsman Louis XV

=== Princes of Conti ===
- François Louis, Prince of Conti (1664–1709), Prince de Conti
- Louis Armand I, Prince of Conti (1661–1685), son-in-law of Louis XIV
- Louis Armand II, Prince of Conti (1695–1727), Prince of Conti
- Louis François, Prince of Conti (1717–1776), French nobleman
- Louis François Joseph, Prince of Conti (1734–1814), last Prince of Conti

=== Others ===
- Prince Louis, Duke of Nemours (1814–1896), son of King Louis Philippe I
- Louis, Prince Napoléon (1914–1997), Head of the House of Bonaparte from 1926 to 1997

== Others ==
=== German princes ===
- Louis I of Anhalt-Köthen (1579–1650), Prince of Anhalt from 1586 to 1603
- Prince Louis of Battenberg (1854–1921), later titled Marquess of Milford Haven, British naval officer and German prince
- Prince Louis of Battenberg (1900–1979), later Louis Mountbatten, 1st Earl Mountbatten of Burma, British naval officer and last Viceroy of India

=== Italian princes ===
- Prince Louis, Count of Aquila (1824–1897), member of the House of Bourbon-Two Sicilies
- Prince Louis, Count of Trani (1838–1886), son of Ferdinand II of the Two Sicilies

=== Monégasque princes ===
- Louis I of Monaco (1642–1701), Prince of Monaco from 1662 to 1701
- Louis II of Monaco (1870–1949), Prince of Monaco from 1922 to 1949

=== Others ===
- Prince Louis of Luxembourg (born 1986), son of Grand Duke Henri
- Prince Louis of Wales (born 2018), son of William, Prince of Wales

== See also ==
- King Louis (disambiguation)
- Louis (disambiguation)
