= Princess Marie Louise of Orleans =

Princess Marie Louise of Orleans may refer to:

- Marie Louise d'Orléans (1662–1689), eldest daughter of Philippe de France and Princess Henrietta Anne of England; later Queen of Spain as wife of Charles II
- Marie Louise Élisabeth d'Orléans (1695–1719), daughter of Philippe II, Duke of Orléans, wife of Charles, Duke of Berry
- Princess Marie Louise of Orléans (1896–1973), daughter of Prince Emmanuel, Duke of Vendôme and Princess Henriette of Belgium
