= Louise de Lorraine =

Louise de Lorraine may refer to:

- Louise of Lorraine, Queen of France (1553–1601)
- Louise Marguerite of Lorraine (1588–1631)
- Louise Henriette Françoise de Lorraine (1707–1737)
- Louise Henriette Gabrielle of Lorraine (1718–1788)
