= Queen Louise =

Queen Louise may refer to:

== People ==
- Queen Louise of Sweden (disambiguation), various queens
- Louise of Lorraine, Queen of France (1553–1601), queen consort of France
- Louise of Mecklenburg-Güstrow (1667–1721), queen consort of Denmark and Norway
- Louise of Great Britain (1724–1751), queen consort of Denmark and Norway
- Louise of Mecklenburg-Strelitz (1776–1810), queen consort of Prussia
- Louise of Orléans (1812–1850), queen consort of Belgium
- Louise of Hesse-Kassel (1817–1898), queen consort of Denmark
- Louise of Sweden (1851–1926), queen consort of Denmark

== Other uses ==
- Queen Louise (1927 film), a German silent historical film
- Queen Louise (1957 film), a West German historical drama film
- Queen Louise Island, Greenland
- Queen Louise Land, Greenland
- Queen Louise League, a German pro-monarchic women's organization

== See also ==
- Marie Louise d'Orléans (1662–1689), queen consort of Spain
- Louise Élisabeth d'Orléans (1709–1742), queen consort of Spain
- Marie Louise, Duchess of Parma (1791–1847), queen consort of Italy
- Louise, Queen of Prussia (film), a 1931 German film
- Queen Louise Bridge, on the Lithuania–Russia border
- Dronning Louises Bro (English: Queen Louise's Bridge), Copenhagen, Denmark
- Queen Louise's Children's Hospital, Copenhagen, Denmark
- Königin Luise (disambiguation)
- Princess Louise (disambiguation)
