= Queen Louise League =

20th-century German pro-monarchy organization

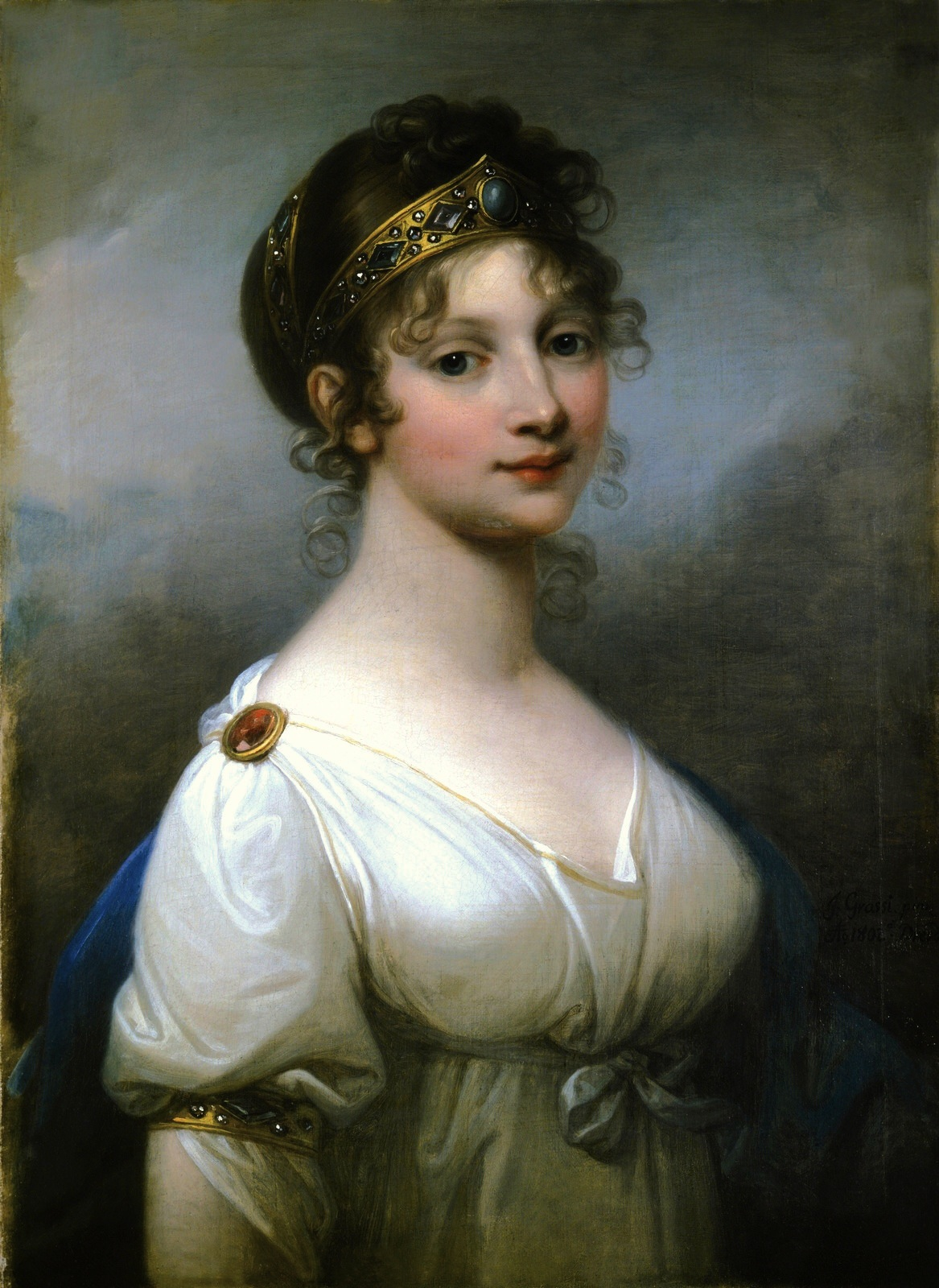
Louise, Queen of Prussia (1776 – 1810)

The "Queen Louise League" (German: Königin-Luise-Bund, often shortened to Luisenbund) was a German monarchist women's organization. It was established in 1923 during the time of the Weimar Republic and lasted until the first years of Nazi Germany. This organization was inspired by the figure of Louise of Mecklenburg-Strelitz, Queen of Prussia, who was held in reverence by many Germans of the time. The Bund Königin Luise had a youth branch - the Kinderkreis ("Children Circle").

The Queen Louise League as an organization had cultic overtones built around the veneration of the former Prussian queen as a role model for all German women. She became idealized for her feminine virtues, her determination and her love for her country, as well as for her beauty and the fact that Napoleon, portrayed as an "enemy of everything German", hated her. The league's ideals were distilled into a booklet named ABC für unsere Arbeit ("ABC for our Work") which every member had to know by heart. Like many of the emergent nationalistic movements of the time, this organization was highly structured, with local branches all over Germany.

== History ==
The Queen Louise League was politically very close to far-right German parties of the time, like the German National People's Party (DNVP) and also the paramilitary Der Stahlhelm organization from its establishment. Many wives of Der Stahlhelm members belonged to the Queen Louise League and they were, like their husbands, strongly opposed to democracy and in favor of German re-armament.

After the Machtergreifung, the takeover of the government of Germany by Adolf Hitler, the Queen Louise League was initially welcomed by the Nazi party as an ally. There were strong bonds between both movements owing to their common extremely conservative ideology and solid German nationalism. Campaigning along with the brownshirts for a "Greater Germany" with expanded borders and "freedom from weight of the reparations", the League's members had taken active part in parades and events organized by the Nazis even before their accession to power. The Queen Louise League shared as well with the Reichskolonialbund the demand for the return of the former German colonies.

Despite its ideological affinity with most of the Nazis' nationalistic ideals, the Queen Louise League was disbanded by the Nazi government in 1934. The reason was the difference in local practices, be it at the Gau or national level, which didn't match those wished by the Nazi leadership of the country. Following its dissolution the members and departments of the Königin-Luise-Bund were integrated into the corresponding branches for women and children of the Nazi Party, like the NS-Frauenschaft (Nazi Women's League), Bund Deutscher Mädel (League of German Girls) and its children section into the National Socialist Schoolchildren's League (NSS) or the Kinderschar of the Nazi Women's League.

== See also ==
- Gleichschaltung
- NS-Frauenschaft
- Bund Deutscher Mädel (BDM)
