= Dronning Louises Bro =

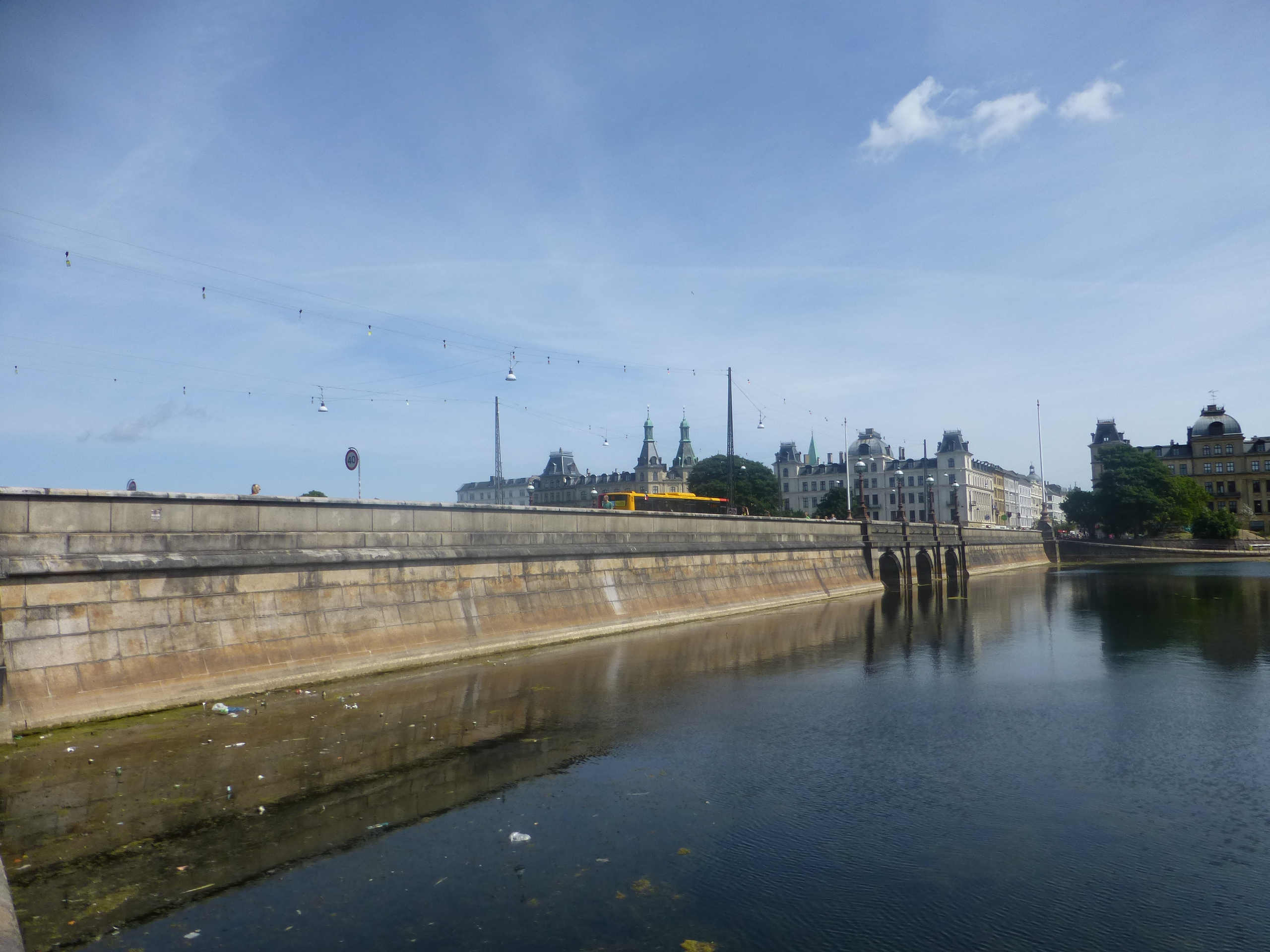
- Coordinates: 55°41′12″N 12°33′50″E
- Carries: Motor vehicles, pedestrian and bicycle traffic
- Crosses: The Lakes
- Locale: Søtorvet; Nørrebro

Characteristics
- Design: Arch bridge

History
- Designer: Vilhelm Dahlerup
- Construction start: 1885
- Construction end: 1887

Location
- Interactive map of Dronning Louises Bro

Dronning Louises Bro (English: Queen Louise's Bridge) is a bridge across The Lakes in central Copenhagen, Denmark. It joins Frederiksborggade in Indre By (city centre) with Nørrebrogade in Nørrebro and separates Sortedam Lake (Sortedam Sø) to the northeast from Peblinge Lake (Peblinge Sø) to the south west.

The bridge was designed by Vilhelm Dahlerup, and constructed between 1885 and 1887. The bridge is named after Queen Louise, King Christian IX's wife. It was listed in 1997.

== History ==
=== The first bridges ===
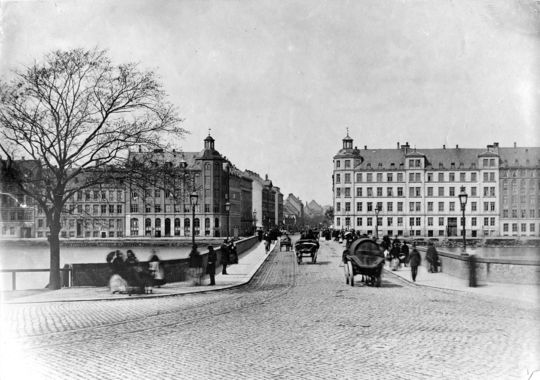
Peblinge Bridge

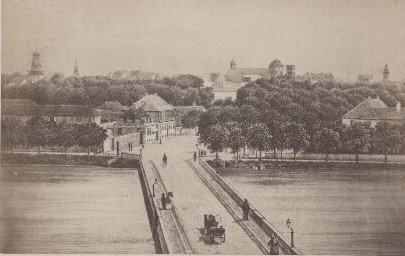
The site where Søtorvet was later built with the old Peblinge Bridge in the foreground

A bridge (fjællebroen)) located close to the site of the current bridge is mentioned in 1562. It provided a link between Copenhagen's North Gate and the Nørrebro Road (Nørrebro Landevej)

In 1618-20, Christian IV built a combined embankment and a wooden bridge as part of his new Frederiksborg Road. The crossing was improved in the 1720s. The embankments in each end was reinforced with large stones and the central bridge section was replaced by a drawbridge.

=== The new bridges ===
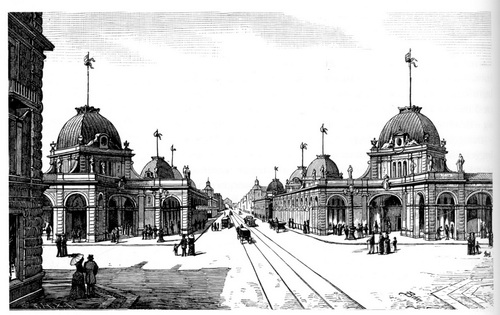
A visualization of Blichfeldt's proposal

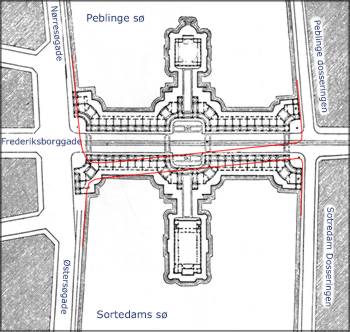
Emil Blichfeldt's unrealized proposal

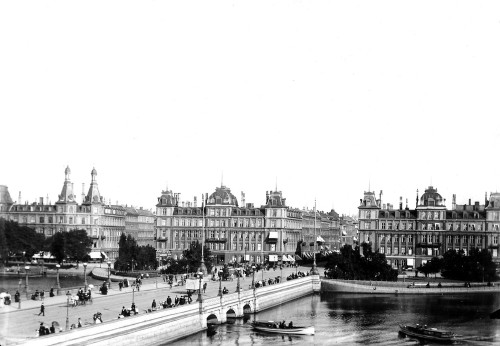
The current bridge in 1899

In the second half of the 19th century the bridge was unable to cope with the booming traffic that was a result of the redevelopment of the area outside Copenhagen's fortifications as well as the growing population in general. The crossing was notorious for being windy even on quiet days and the architect Emil Blichfeldt therefore proposed a bridge lined with shop with inspiration from the Medieval bridges of Florence and Venice. Blichfeld pointed out that the extension of Frederiksborggade had developed into a thriving shopping street with no vacant shops and that the solution would therefore make sense. His proposal was featured in the magazine Ude og Hjemme in 1883 where it was described as "both practical and artistically well-designed. The proposal was discussed on a meeting in the City Council on 18 April 1884 where it was supported by 13 votes against 12 but the magistrate instead chose a simpler and more traditional proposal by Vilhelm Dahlerup. Construction began in 1885 and the bridge opened on Queen Louise's 70th birthday 7 September 1887. The bridge became known as the Peblinge Bridge (Peblingebroen).

== Design ==
Queen Louise's Bridge is built of granite and has three arches. The cast iron railings are decorated by four identical bronze cartouches featuring Copenhagen's coat of arms surrounded by weapons, helmets and lions. The railing integrates eight lampposts and four flagpoles. It was listed in 1997.

== Cultural references ==
The bridge is mentioned in the song Hjerterdame on Kim Larsen og Bellami's 1986 album Forklædt som voksen. The bridge was located close to Kim Larsen's home on Rørholmsgade.

== See also ==
- List of bridges in Copenhagen
