= The Lakes, Copenhagen =

Artificial lakes in Copenhagen, Denmark

The Lakes Søerne
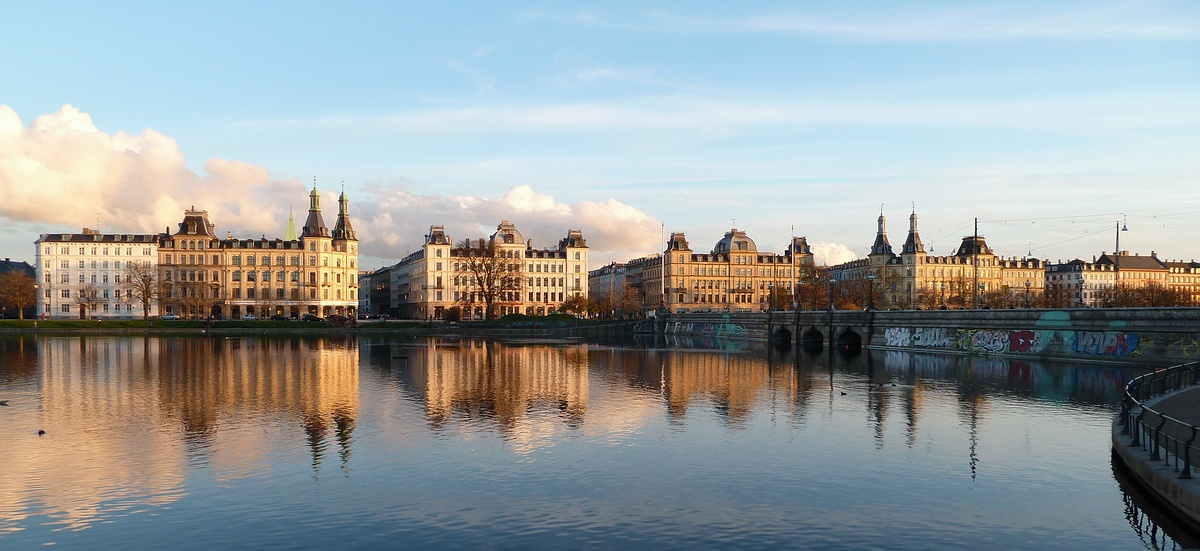
- Sortedams Sø with Søtorvet and Dronning Louises Bro

- Location within Copenhagen
- Location: Copenhagen
- Coordinates: 55°41′20″N 12°34′01″E
- Type: artificial lakes
- Basin countries: Denmark
- Sections/sub-basins: Sortedam Lake, Peblinge Lake, Sankt Jørgens Lake

The Lakes (Danish: Søerne) in Copenhagen, Denmark is a row of three rectangular lakes curving around the western margin of the City Centre, forming one of the oldest and most distinctive features of the city's topography. The paths around them are popular with strollers, bikers and runners.

== History ==
The area where the lakes now reside was originally one long stream with an arch shape, just outside the city levees. In the early Middle Ages, a need for water to power watermills spurred the construction of a dam, which in turn caused the creation of the Peblinge Sø.

As a result of a siege of Copenhagen in 1523, the city decided to expand the entrenchments to improve the fortifications of the city. The levee at Peblinge Sø was expanded and another lake, the Sortedams Sø, was created. In the beginning of the 17th century, further damming created the Sankt Jørgens Sø. This made it possible to flood the banks and lakes in case of an attack.

Peblinge Sø and Sortedams Sø also served as reservoirs for the city, and in the period 1705–1727 they were cleaned and dug deeper. The edges were also straightened, giving them their current shape. In the middle of the 18th century, they were discontinued as a source of drinking water due to poor water quality. Sankt Jørgens Sø was to be used instead and was thus cleaned and straightened in a similar manner as the two other lakes 120 years earlier. Until the end of World War II, it played a central role in as a reservoir in Copenhagen and as a backup reservoir until 1959.

The first Fredensbro (bridge) was built across Sortedams Sø in 1878 as a small wooden bridge. The current Fredensbro is a wide levee that separates the two basins. It was built in 1976–1977.

The vertical slopes of Peblinge Sø and Sortedams Sø were made in 1929, where the pathways surrounding the lakes also were made. In the 1960s it was suggested a four lane city ring (named Søringen) be constructed, but the project was abandoned and the lakes were granted the status of protected area in 1966.

Fugleøen (the Bird Island) is located within the northern basin of Sortedams Sø. It rose to fame in 1967, when it was "liberated" by a group of activists who declared it an independent state separate from Denmark.

During the 2010s, the local governments of Copenhagen and Frederiksberg explored plans to create a park around Sankt Jørgens Sø, with the dual use of acting as a detention basin for cloudburst flood waters. Likely as a consequence of global warming, cloudbursts have become much more common in Denmark, making the sewerage pipes designed for the old weather patterns insufficient; using Sankt Jørgens Sø as a detention basin is just one of many such projects in Copenhagen. The proposed plans were largely set aside after mass criticism from the public, which eliminated any political support to challenge the protected status of Sankt Jørgens Sø and the other lakes.

== Geography ==
Basic layout of the lakes

The landmark consist of three artificial lakes, which are divided into five basins:

- Sankt Jørgens Sø (English: Saint George's Lake) is made of two basins (south and north) with the southernmost point at the Tycho Brahe Planetarium and northernmost point at Gyldenløvesgade (a continuation of H. C. Andersens Boulevard which passes City Hall Square). The two basins are divided by a levee that serves as a foundation for the street Kampmannsgade.
- Peblinge Sø (English: Student Lake). A single basin between Gyldenløvesgade and Dronning Louises Bro (English: Queen Louise's Bridge), which is the continuation of Nørrebrogade. The word pebling means little priest, and was used metaphorically for any student in the elementary and secondary schools in Denmark during the time when the church was the sole provider of education.
- Sortedams Sø (English: Black Pond Lake or Black Dam Lake) consists of two basins (north and south). The southernmost point is by the Dronning Louises Bro, while the northernmost is by Østerbro. The lakes are separated by Fredensbro (English: Bridge of the Peace).

== Water ==
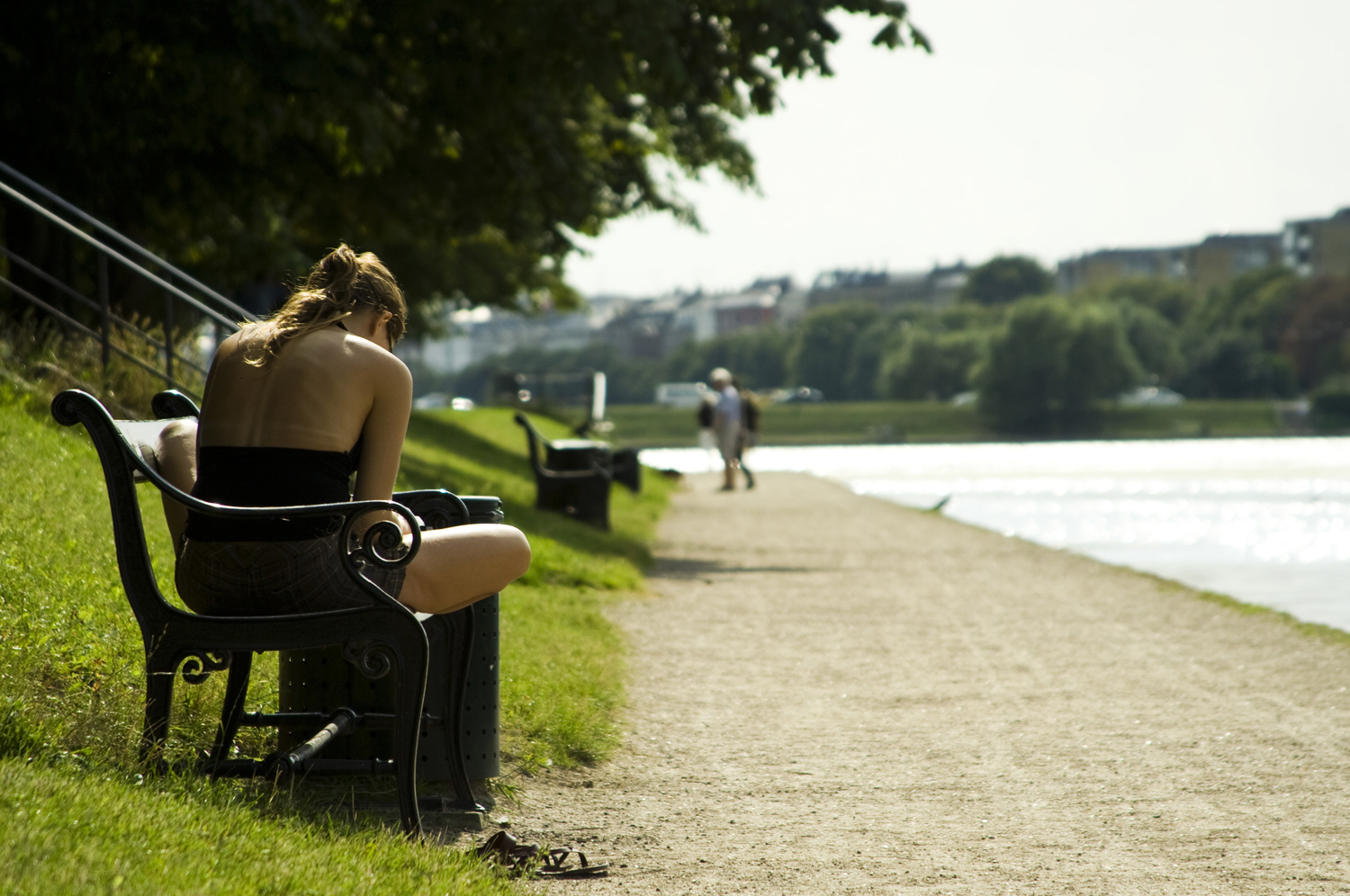
Reading at Sortedam Lake

The lakes' inlet is through piped streams (Grøndalsåen, Lygteåen and Ladegårdsåen). These streams jointly provide water from the wet-area Utterslev Mose, the lake Emdrup Sø and to a lesser degree the lake Damhussøen. Ladegårdsåen was converted from an open stream to a piped stream in 1925 and is located below the streets Ågade and Åboulevarden. It provides water for Peblinge Sø and has its endpoint near the pavilion Søpavillonen (English: The Lake Pavilion). From the lakes the water is streamed further on, with an endpoint at the north end of Sortedams Sø, to the lakes in Østre Anlæg, the Fredrikshavn Entrenchment and Øresund. The water has an average time in the lakes of approximately 1 year.

The water in Utterslev Mose and Emdrup Sø is very high in nutrients. As a result of this, large quantities of algae formed in the lakes and the water became rather unclear as well as hindering animal and plant life. In 1999 the municipality of Copenhagen erected a water treatment plant by Emdrup Sø, to clean the water that was being led to the lakes. This allowed for the re-creation of the water environment. Currently the water is much more clear and animal and plant life are present.

== Use ==
The lakes primarily serve as a recreational area and the paths surrounding them are popular for strolls and a favoured running route. The total distance around the lakes is 6.4 km.

Sankt Jørgens Sø has a depth of 4–5 metres with sloped sides. The other lakes have a depth of 2.5 metres, with hard vertical edges (made of granite). In Sortedams Sø, two artificial islands have been created. They are named Fiskeøen (English: The Fish Island) and Fugleøen (English: The Bird Island) and both serve as sanctuary for birds.

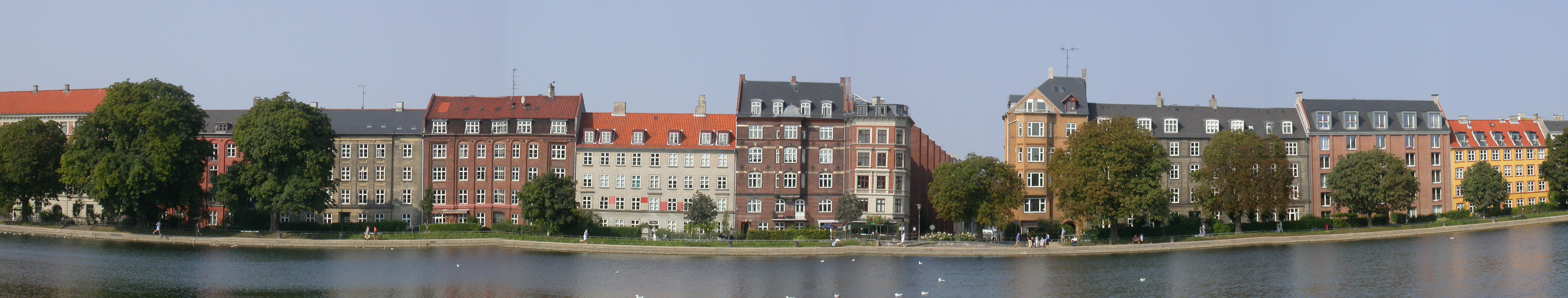
Panoramic view of the Nørrebro side of Peblinge Lake

== See also ==
- Søtorvet, Copenhagen
- Sortedam Lake
