= Hippocampus Well =

Fountain by Niels Skovgaard

The Hippocampus Well (Danish: Havhestebrønden) is a fountain by Niels Skovgaard, carved in stone in the shape of a Hippocampus. Originally installed on Kultorvet in Copenhagen, it has now been moved to the central courtyard of the Danish Design Museum on Bredgade. A plaster model is on display in Vejen Art Museum.

== History ==
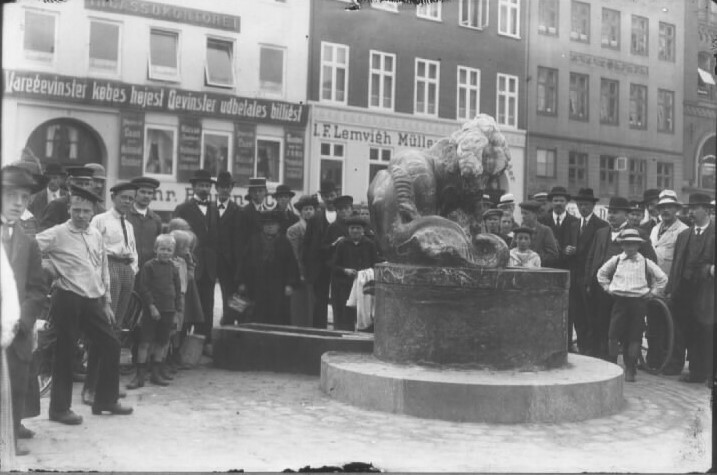
The fountain photographed by Holger Damgaard on Kultorvet in 1923.

The fountain was created as Niels Skovgaard's submission to a competition for a new fountain on Vesterbros Torv in Copenhagen. Elijah's Church was inaugurated on the square in April 1906. At its meeting on 20 May 1908, Foreningen til Hovedstadens Forskønnelse decided to launch a competition for the design of a fountain for the "new square". The three other artists who were invited to participate in the competition were Rasmus Harboe, Hans Tegner and J. F. Willumsen. The deadline for submissions of their proposals were already in July the same year. Hans Tegner did not submit a proposal. Willumsens proposal was believed to require too much water. The board of the association did not have a clear favourite between Skovgaard's and Harboe's proposals. It was initially decided to install 1;1 models of both works on the square but Skovgaard was unable to meet the deadline and Harboe's proposal was therefore selected as the winner.

The architect Hans Henrik Koch had been strongly in favour of Skovgaard's proposal. In November 1910, at a board meeting in Fonden til Kunstneriske Formaals Fremme, he proposed that it should be installed in another location. It was ultimately decided to install it on Kultorvet. It was unveiled in August 1916. The greenish stone from Norway soon turned out to be badly affected by the weather. In 1923 the fountain was therefore moved to a more protected location in the courtyard of the Danish Museum of Arts & Crafts.

== Other versions ==
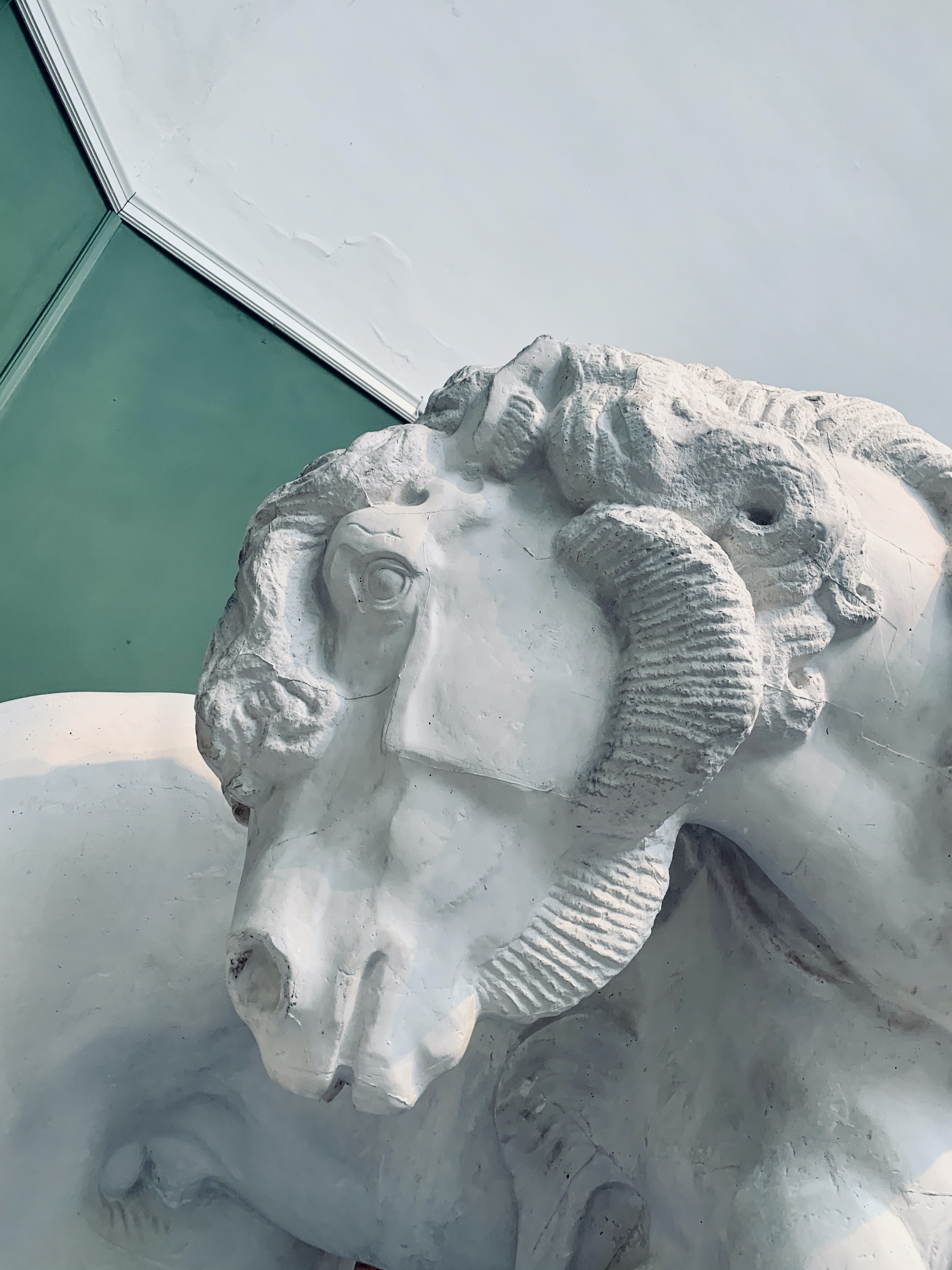
Detail of one of the plaster models in Vejen Art Museum.

A plaster model from 1908 was acquired by the Ny Carlsberg Foundation in 1943. It is in the collection of Sorø Art Museum.

A 1:1 plaster model was put on storage in Christiansborg Palace. In 1996, the severely damaged model was transferred to Vejen Art Museum. It was subsequently restored and is now on display in the museum's Skibbelund Hall. Om April 2004, Bejen Kunstmuseum bought another plaster model of the work (19.2 × 18.8 × 28.2 cm) at auction. A stoneware version is located in a private garden.
