= A/S Københavns Telefonkiosker =

Defunct operator of manned telephone kiosks in Copenhagen, Denmark

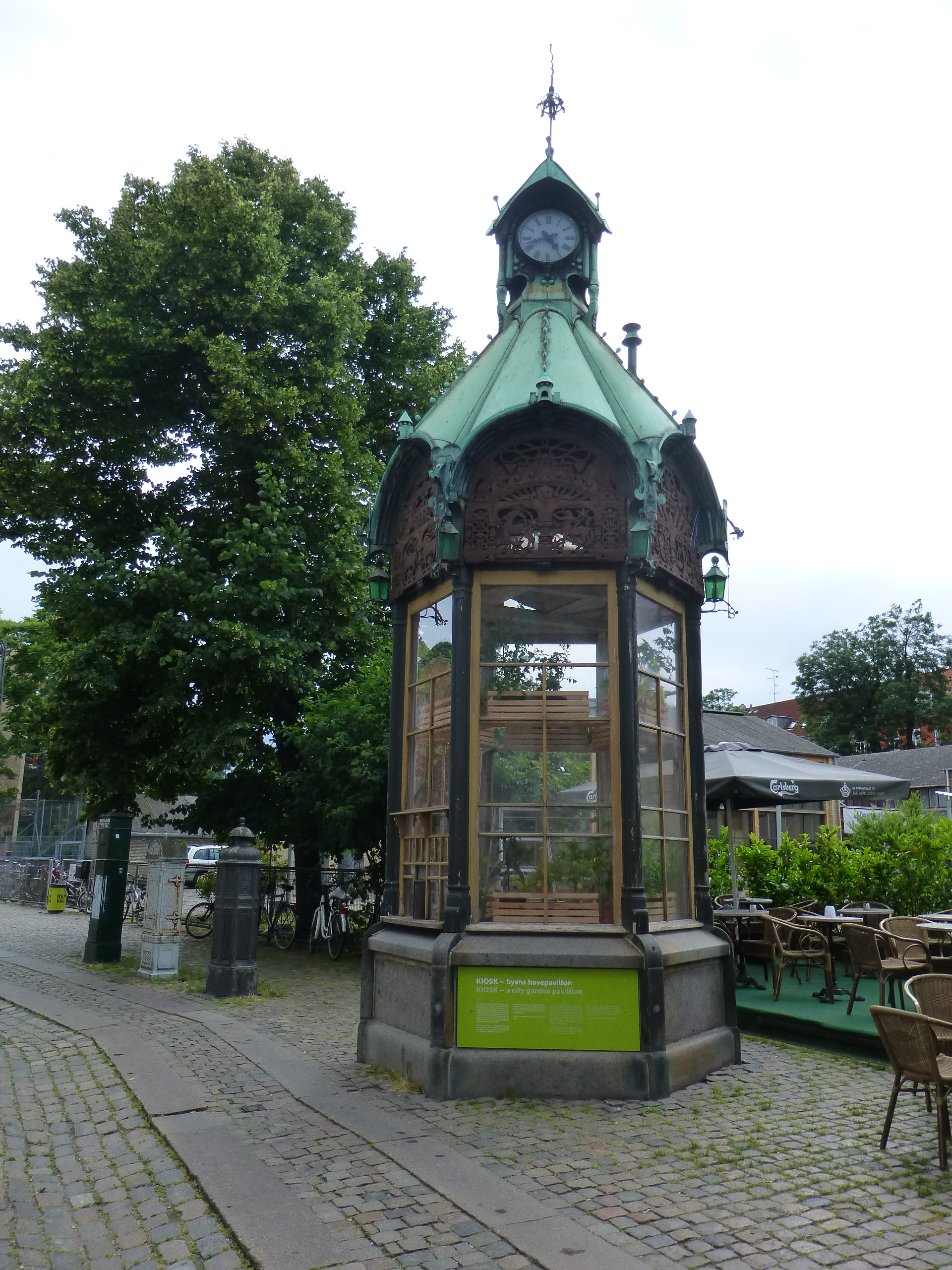
A/S Københavns Telefonkiosker's former telephone kiosk from Sølvtorvet, now located in the "museum street" next to the Museum of Copenhagen

A/S Københavns Telefonkiosker (old spelling: A/S Kjøbenhavns Telefonkiosker), often referred to as KTK, was an operator of staffed telephone kiosks in Copenhagen, Denmark. The first telephone kiosks were installed in 1896 to an Art Nouveau-influenced National Romantic design by Fritz Koch. A new and somewhat larger model was introduced in 1913 but Koch's original design was again used when a number of new telephone kiosks were installed in 1929.

Eight of the telephone kiosks have survived and most of them are now used as café pavilions. One of Koch's telephone kiosks, located at Poul Henningsens Plads in Østerbro, was listed on the Danish registry of protected buildings and places in 1996. Another one has been moved to Gabels Torv in Aalborg.

== History ==
=== Background ===
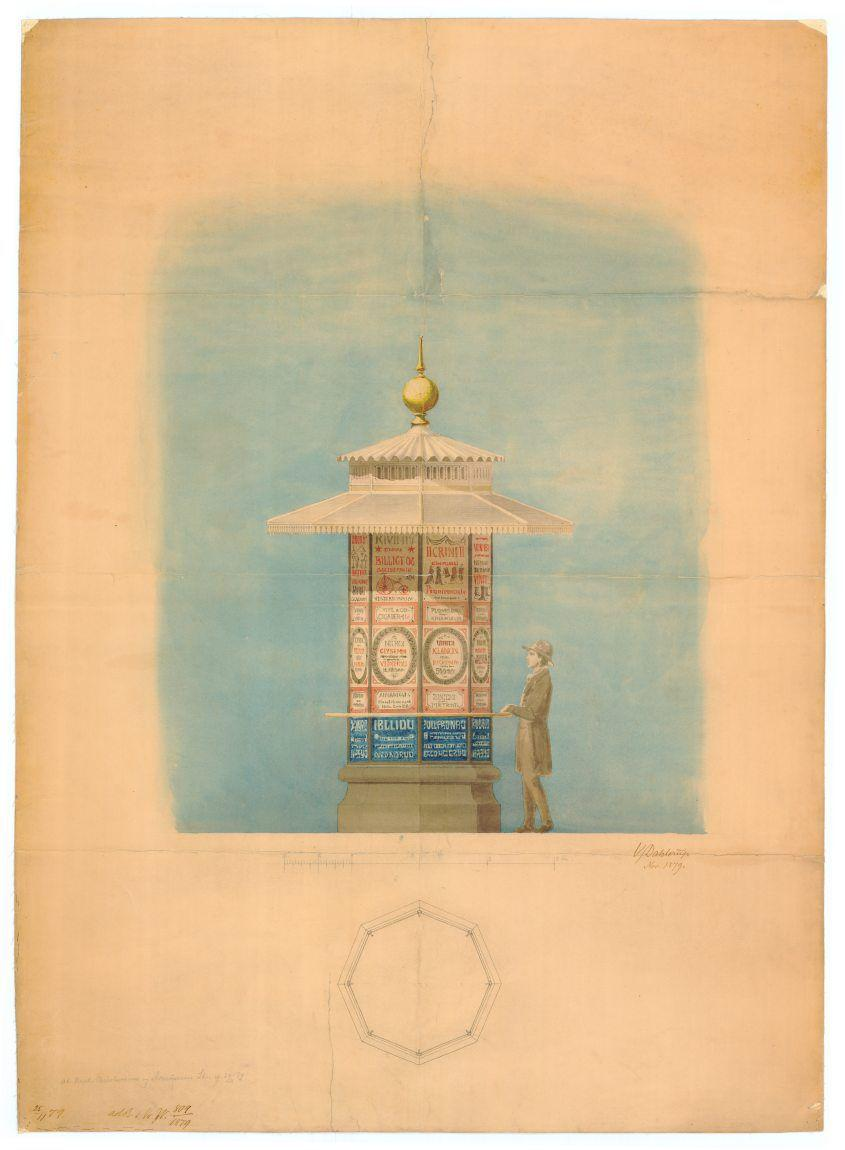
Vilhelm Dahlerup's design proposal from 1879

The first telephone company in Copenhagen was established in 1877 and an unrealized design proposal for telephone kiosks in Copenhagen was already created by Vilhelm Dahlerup in 1879. Københavns Telefonselskab (KTAS) was founded in 1882.

=== The first 10 kiosks ===
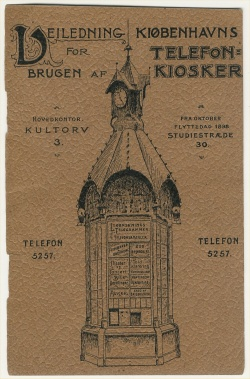
Instructions from one of the telephone kiosks

In 1989, it still only had 1,487 out of a population of more than 250,000 in the city. The need for public telephones was therefore evident. On 3 September 1895, A/S Kjøbenhavns Telefonkiosker obtained a concession from the city magistrate on the installation and operation of up to 15 telephone kiosks in a 15-year period in Copenhagen.

Fritz Koch, an assistant for city architect Ludvig Fenger, was charged with the design of the new kiosks. The first four kiosks opened at Kongens Nytorv, Gammeltorv, Nørre Boulevard (now Nørre Voldgade) and the City Hall Square on 1 June 1906. They were followed by kiosks at Gyldenløvesgade, Grønningen, Vesterbros Torv, Sølvtorvet, Dronning Louises Bro and Sankt Annæ Plads later that same year. bringing the total number of telephone kiosks up to 10. Another one, located at Lille Triangel in

Østerbro, opened in 1897 but then the construction stopped.

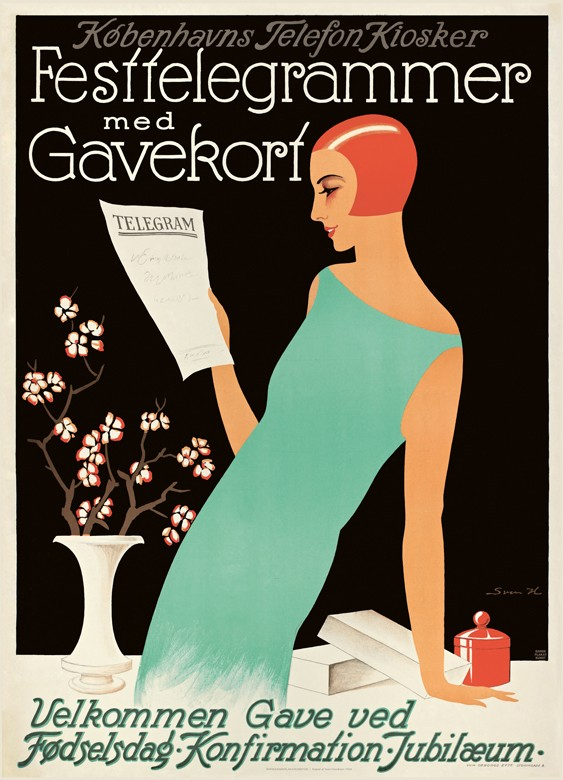
Advertisement poster by Sven Henriksen for greeting telegrams from A/S Københavns Telefonkiosker by way of bicycle messenger

The inspiration for the kiosks came from Paris. They were open from 7 a.m. to 11 p.m. and each kiosk contained two telephones. The kiosk lady also sold a wide selection of kiosk items such as newspapers and magazines, stamps, theatre tickets and even insurance policies. It was also possible to call the telephone kiosk to leave a message with the kiosk lady which she would then send to the recipient by bicycle messenger.

=== More kiosks and a new design ===
Fritz Koch died in 1905. Another architect, Martin Jensen, created a design for new and somewhat larger telephone kiosks in 1913. They replaced many of Koch's kiosks and were also built in a number of new locations. The new design was criticized and in 1929m when the company once again wanted to install new telephone kiosks, the city required them to be built to the old design. In 1932, Curt Bie from the city architect's office created a Functionalist design for new kiosks. A total of 30 telephone kiosks were built.

The telephone kiosks gradually lost their raison d'être as private telephones became common. Many of the kiosks were removed in connection with road expansions or redesign of public spaces.

KTK was for many years based at the City Hall Square. It later moved to the Enghave Center at Mathæusgade in Vesterbro. It was dissolved in 1980.

== Design ==
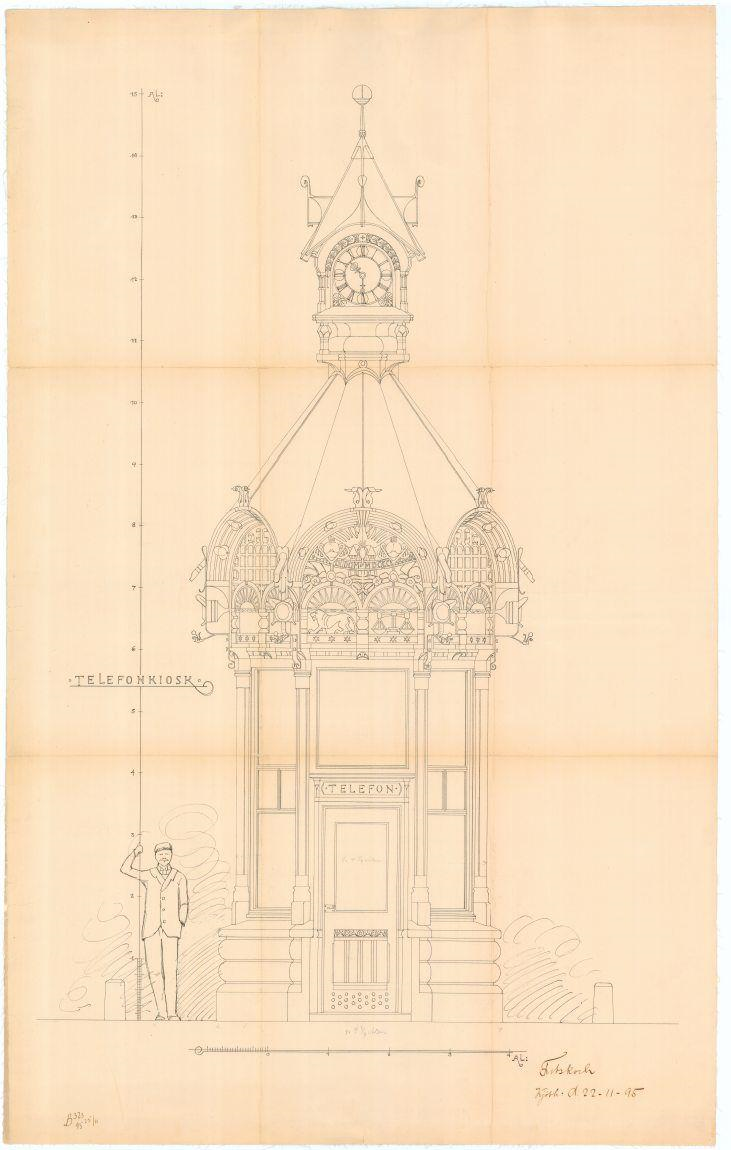
Fritz Koch rendering from 1895

Koch's original telephone kiosks are nine metres tall, hexagonal and with a floor area of approximately nine square metres. They are constructed in pine wood on a granite plinth. The copper roof is topped by a triangular flèche with clock faces on all sides. Just below the roof are six teak tree reliefs, one on each side, featuring the 12 astrological sign. Above the reliefs is a frieze with symbolic representations of shipping (ships), industry (tools), (then) modern technology (telephoning gentlemen) and agriculture (animals and plants).

Jensen's telephone kiosks from 1913 are designed in the Neo-Baroque style. They are also hexagonal and topped by a copper roof but somewhat larger.

== Legacy ==
Most of the surviving telephone kiosks are now used as café pavilions. The telephone kiosk at Jagtvej/Poul Henningsens Plads is the only one of Koch's ten original kiosks that still stands in its original location. The kiosk from Sølvtorvet was moved to the "museum street" next to Museum of Copenhagen in Absalonsgade. The one from Lille Triangel was acquired by Nordjullands Kunstmuseum and was in 2010 rebuilt in Gabels Torv in Aalborg. The kiosks from Enghave Plads and Gammeltorv were acquired by Tivoli Gardens and at least one of them have been rebuilt in the historic gardens.

The 1929 version of Koch telephone kiosks have survived in Kultorvet Christianshavns Torv and Sankt Hans Torv.

Jensen's telephone kiosks from 1913 are still seen in Nytorv, Kongens Nytorv and Nørre Voldgade but the two latter have been moved a little in connection with a redesign of the surroundings.

=== List of telephone kiosks ===
Original location

Location	Image	Neighbourhood	Orifina	Coordinates	Notes
Kongens Nytorv		City centre	Koch, 1996		Demolished
Gammeltorv		City centre	Koch, 1896		Removed, acquired by Tivoli Gardens
City Hall Square		City centre	Koch, 1996		Demolished
Nørre Voldgade (Nørre Boulevard)		City centre	Koch, 1996		Demolished
Gyldenløvesgade		City centre	Koch, 1996		Demolished
Grønningen/Store Kongensgade		City centre	Koch, 1996		Demolished
Esplanaden (Toldbodvej)		City centre	Koch, 1996		Demolished
Vesterbros Torv		Vesterbro	Koch, 1996		Demolished
Sølvtorvet		City centre	Koch, 1996		Moved to the Museum Street at Absalonsgade
Dronning Louises Bro/Nørrebrogade		Nørrebro	Koch, 1996	Demolished	
Jagtvej/Poul Henningsens Plads		Østerbro	Koch		Still there and listed in 1994
Østerbrogade/Lille Triangel		Østerbro	Koch, 1997		Moved to Nordjyllands Kunstmuseum in 1773 and Gabels Torv in Aalborg 2010
Kongens Nytorv		City centre	Jensen, 1913		Moved a few metres in connection with a refurbishment of Kongens Nytorv in 2004
Nytorv		City centre	Jensen, 1913		Still there
Nørre Voldgade (Nørre Boulevard)		City centre	Jensen, 1913		Moved from the central reservation at Frederiksborggade to the beginning of Fiolstræde
Nørrebros Runddel		Nørrebro	Jensen, 1996		Demolished
Blågårds Plads		Nørrebro	Koch, 1929		Demolished
Kultorvet		City centre	Koch, 1929		Still there
Sankt Hans Torv		Nørrebro	Koch, 1996		Still there
Sankt Annæ Plads		City centre	Koch, when?		Demolished
Enghave Plads		Vesterbro			Removed, acquired by Tivoli Gardens
Christianshavns Torv		Christianshavn	Koch		Still there

Moved telephone kiosks

Location	Image	Neighbourhood	Orifina	Coordinates	Notes
Absalonsgade		Vesterbro	Koch		Moved to the "museum street" at Museum of Copenhagen from its original location at Sølvtorvet
Dyrehavsbakken		Kongens Lyngby	Koch		Moved to the amusement park Dyrehavsbakken from its original location at Store Kongensgade/Gernersgade
Aalborg		Aalborg	Koch		Originally located at Lille Triangel but later moved to Nordjyllands Kunstmuseum and then the square
