= Ernestine Nyrop =

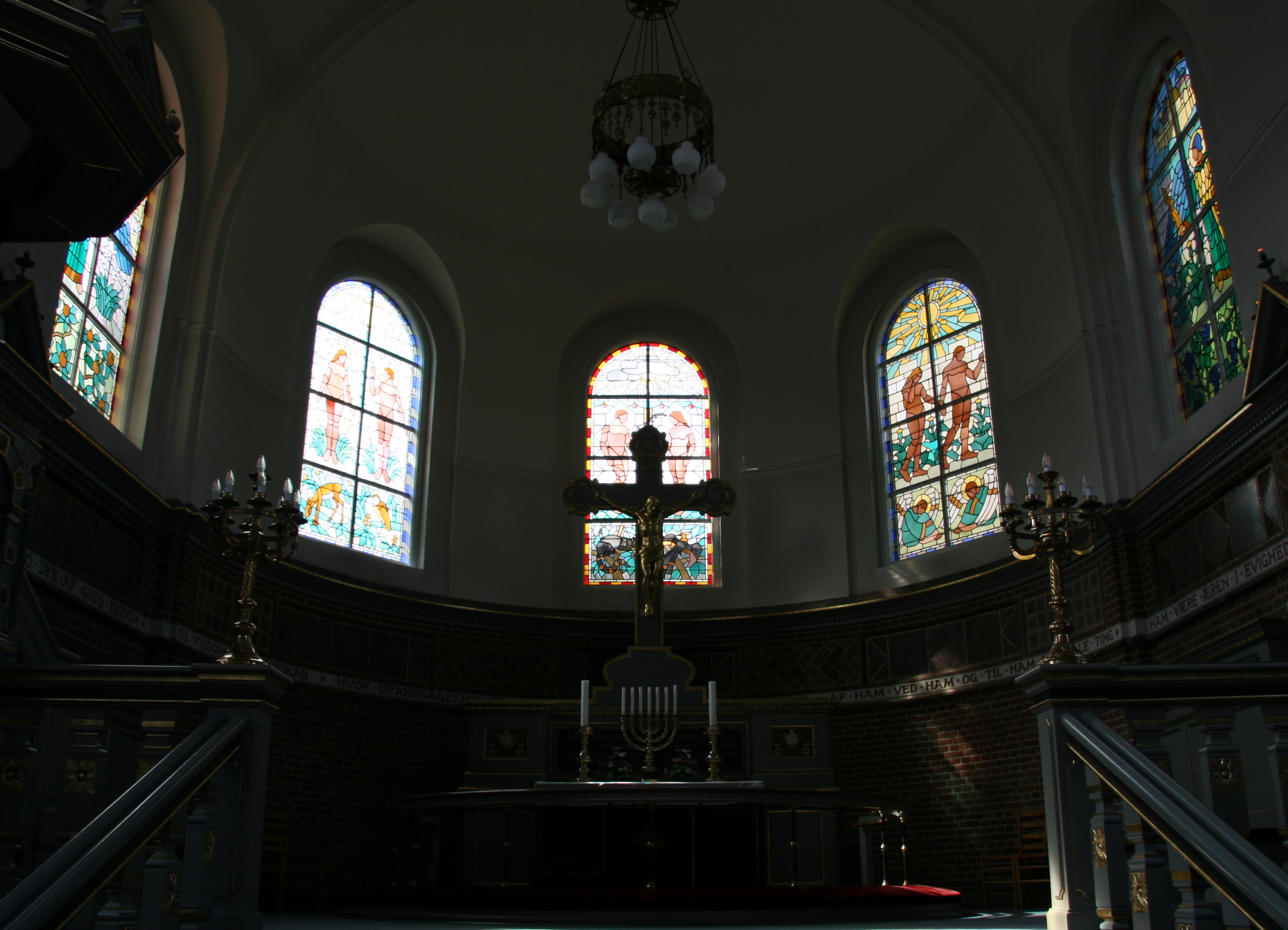
Nyrop's stained glass windows in Copenhagen's Luther Church

Ernestine Nyrop (1888–1975) was a Danish textile artist and fresco painter who is remembered for decorating churches in Denmark and Sweden. In 1930, she published a series of traditional Danish sewing and weaving patterns in Danske Mønstre til Syning og Vævning I-II. From 1937 to 1959, Nyrop contributed actively to Dansk Paramenthandel, an organization devoted to ensuring high-quality standards for textile art in churches.

== Biography ==
Born on 9 March 1888 in Copenhagen, Ernestine Nyrop was the daughter of the architect Martin Nyrop (1849–1921) and Louise Frederikke Laub (1851–1933). She was brought up in a culturally conscious home with connections to the Grundtvigian folk high schools, including Askov and Vallekilde. She attended the Tegne- og Kunstindustriskolen for Kvinder (Drawing and Art Industrial School for Women), after which she took lessons under Bertha Dorph at the art school she ran with her husband. She graduated in 1915 from the Royal Danish Academy of Fine Arts, where she had specialized in decorative arts under the fresco painter Joakim Skovgaard.

In 1912–1913 together with other artists she painted a number of wall frescos depicting Zealand landscapes at Bispebjerg Hospital, also designed by her father. In 1918, she designed the stained glass windows in the choir of Copenhagen's Luther Church, drawing inspiration from compositions from the Middle Ages. In 1920, she decorated St. Andrew's Church with large wall frescos depicting De hellige tre Konger (The Three Kings) and Kvinderne ved Graven (The Women at the Tomb), also in the style of the Middle Ages.

As a textile artist, she frequently collaborated with Margrete Drejer, aiming for high standards of embroidery. In 1918, together with Drejer and Mary Elisa Havning (1888–1972), she held a special exhibition of paintings and decorative arts including embroidery and weaving. The patterns for Drejer's altar cloths and church textiles were frequently created by Nyborg, often inspired by traditional designs. Some of these works have been preserved in Maribo Cathedral.

Nyborg sought to revive interest in older Danish embroidery work, especially cross stitch. In 1930, with support from the New Carlsberg Foundation, she published Danske Mønstre til Syning og Vævning I-II (Danish Sewing and Weaving Patterns), based principally on cross-stitch patterns from northern and western Zealand and from Amager. From 1937 to 1959, Nyrop contributed actively to Dansk Paramenthandel, an organization devoted to ensuring a high level of quality in the use of textile art in churches.

Ernestine Nyrop spent her later life in Ordrup where she died on 30 July 1975.
