= Harboe =

Harboe may refer to:

== People ==
- Ludvig Harboe, Danish bishop
- Rasmus Harboe, Danish sculptor
- Felipe Harboe, Chilean politician

== Other ==
- Harboes Bryggeri, Danish brewery
