= Elijah's Church =

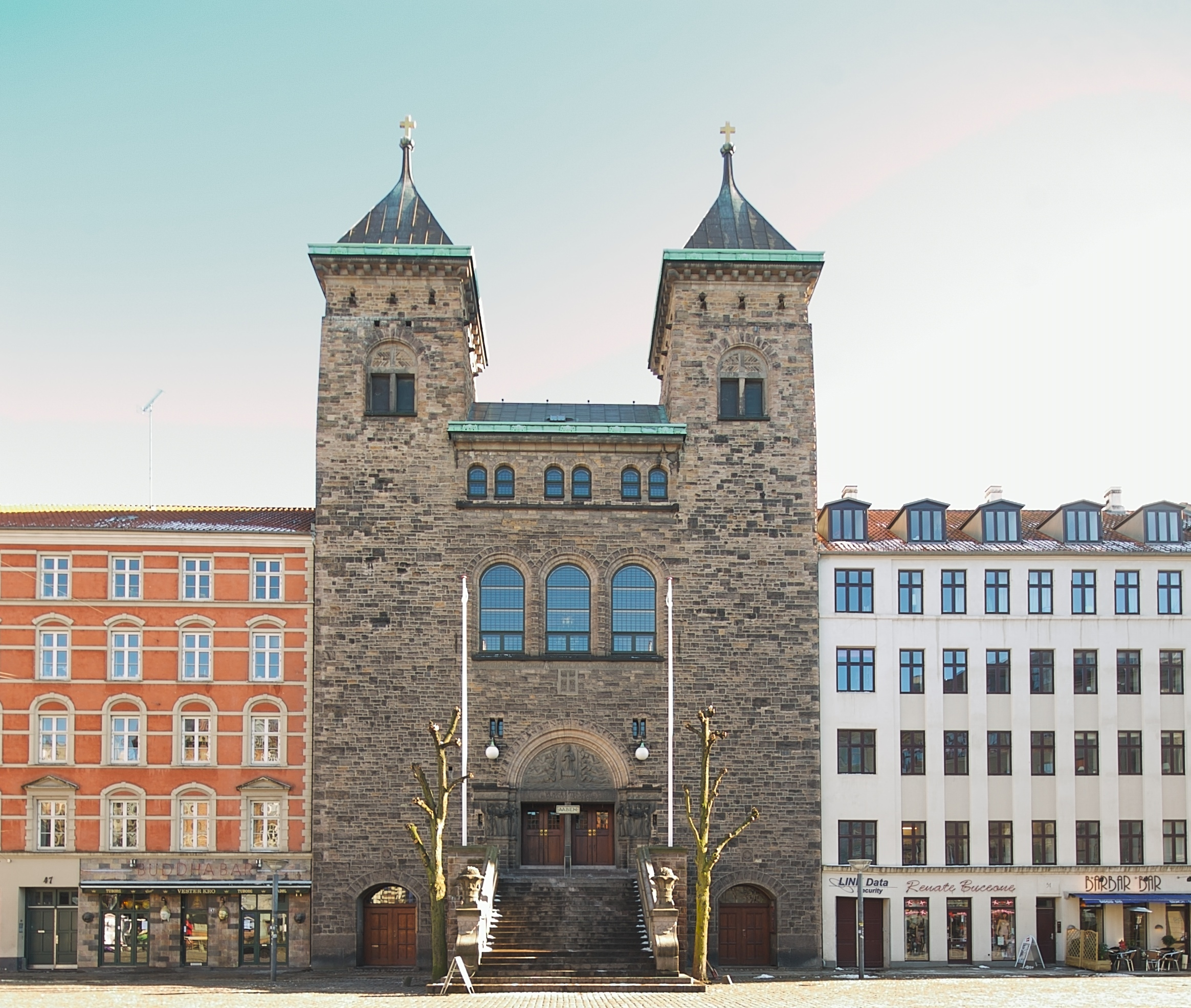
- Elijah's Church
- Elijah's Church
- 55°40′18.8″N 12°33′19.3″E
- Location: 49 Vesterbrogade; Vesterbro, Copenhagen
- Country: Denmark
- Denomination: Church of Denmark
- Website: www.eliaskirken.dk (in Danish)

History
- Status: Church

Architecture
- Architect: Martin Nyrop
- Architectural type: Church
- Style: Neo-Romanesque
- Groundbreaking: 8 April 1906
- Completed: 17 May 1908
- Construction cost: DKK 317,050

Specifications
- Materials: Brick

Administration
- Archdiocese: Diocese of Copenhagen

Elijah's Church (Danish: Elias Kirke) is a Church of Denmark parish church located on Vesterbros Torv in the heart of the Vesterbro district of Copenhagen, Denmark. Completed in 1908 and designed by Martin Nyrop, who has designed Copenhagen City Hall, it was the largest church to be built by the Copenhagen Church Foundation.

== History ==
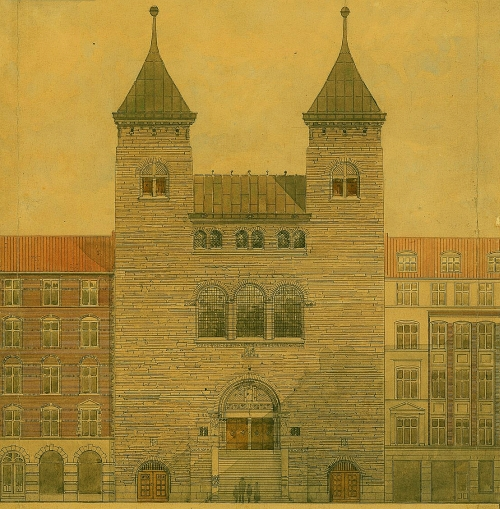
Detail from one of Nyrop's renderings

Elijah's Church is one of the many new churches built by the Copenhagen Church Foundation to accommodate the fast-growing population of the new districts of the city around the turn of the 20th century. When St. Matthew's was separated from Frederiksberg Parish in 1880, it had a population of 25,000 inhabitants but by the end of the century it had almost tripled to about 70,000.

On 28 March 1898 the Church Foundation acquired the site on Vesterbro Torv, until then the site of a factory which produced timing belts, and Martin Nyrop was commissioned to design the new church. He had previously designed the new Copenhagen City Hall which was under construction at the old haymarket not far away. Construction costs were expected to amount to DKK 200,000 which were to be collected locally.

Nyrop's proposal was published on 31 January 1900. The foundation stone was set on 8 April 1906, Palm Sunday, and the church was topped out on 16 December that same year. The church was consecrated on 17 May 1908. It was the fifth church to be built in Vesterbro and it remained the largest church ever built by the Church Foundation. The final construction costs amounted to DKK 317,050, including DKK 81,000 for the site, and the collection which had been raised in time for the inauguration.

The church became a stronghold for the Church Association for the Inner Mission in Denmark in the capital.

== Architecture ==
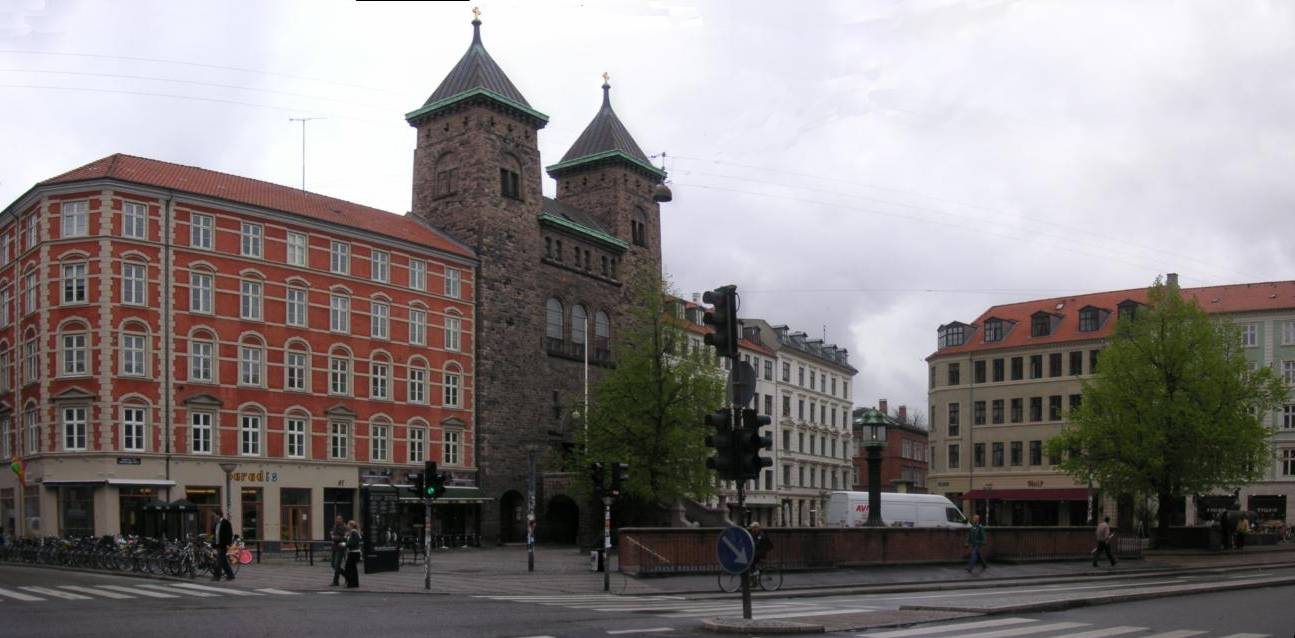
Location on the square

The church is built to a Neo-Romanesque design and integrated in the row of houses on the square. The twin towers which dominate the west-facing façade towards the square are inspired by Tveje Merløse and Fjenneslev Churches. Dressed in split sandstone laid in an irregular bond, the church has a rough facade which marked the beginning of a new era in Danish architecture.

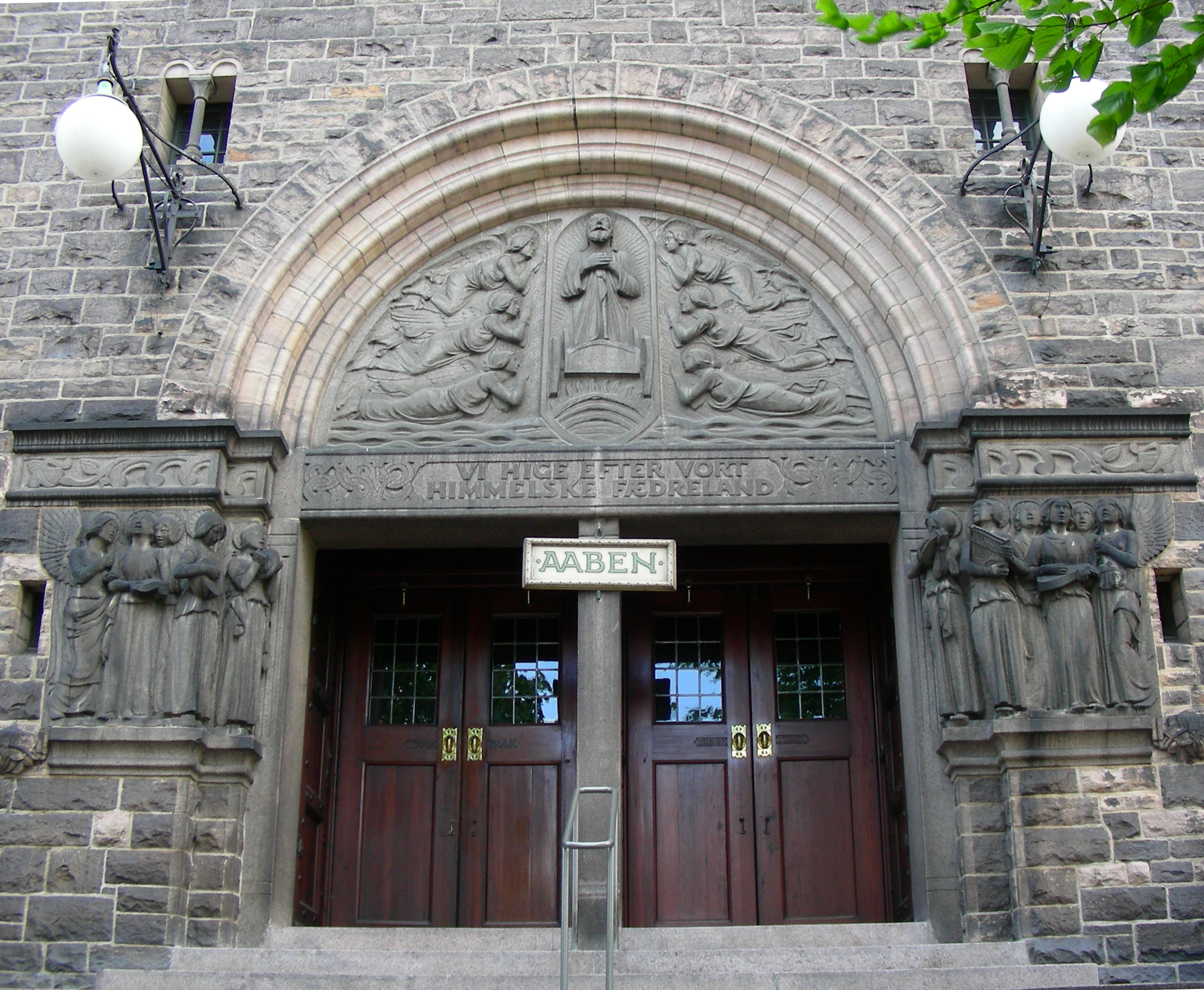
The portal in the main entrance

The portal is split in two by a trumeau as is often seen in French romanesque churches. The tympanum depicts the Ascension of Elijah. The portal is flanked by angels singing and playing musical instruments. All the decorations are the work of Rasmus Harboe.

A broad steep flight of stairs leads to the main entrance. It contains a shed which was put at the disposal of the municipal park authority for wheelbarrows and other tools and materials. When Nyrop's design was first published, the city made a demand for DKK 700 in rent for the area of the square taken up by the stairs. The shed was a compromise. The stairs are clad in the same split sandstone from Nexø which covers the façade. It is decorated with carved sheaves.

== Interior ==
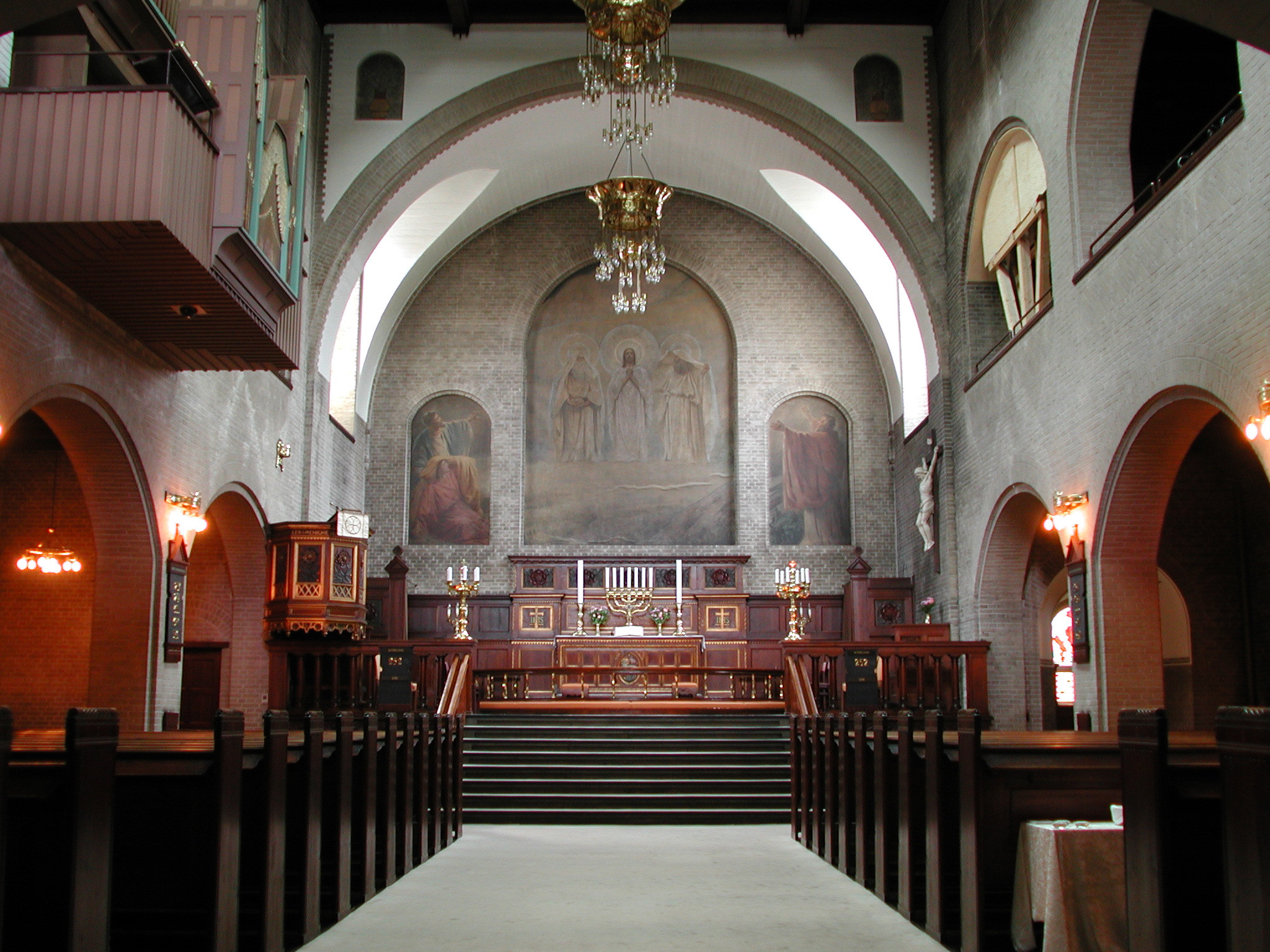
Interior

Elijah's Church is a three nave church with a barrel vaulted choir which is raised eight steps up from the nave. The interior walls are dressed in a light coloured sandstone and the lateral naves are separated from the central nave by arcades. There is a gallery in front of the three large windows which faces the square. To provide the church with additional natural light, despite the lack of external walls, the central nave has a raised central section with a pitched skylight along its full length.

== Furnishings ==
The altarpiece is painted by Frans Schwartz.

== Cultural references ==
The church is used as a location in the 1952 film Avismanden.

== See also ==
- Church of Christ
