= Sven Henriksen =

Sven Henriksen (1890-1935) was a Danish poster artist. He was the only artist in the Golden Age of Danish poster art who exclusively worked with poster design.

== Biography ==
Sven Henriksen began his career as a poster artist in circa 1910 after feaduating from Copenhagen Technival College and completing an aprentership as a painter. He was also active as an exhibition organizer and created numerous posters for his owns exhibitions.

He died from sepsis at the peak of his career after hurting himself on a nail in his studio.

== Style ==
Sven Henriksen was influenced by German poster art. His posters are characterized by simple compositions with strong, striking colours.

== Gallery ==
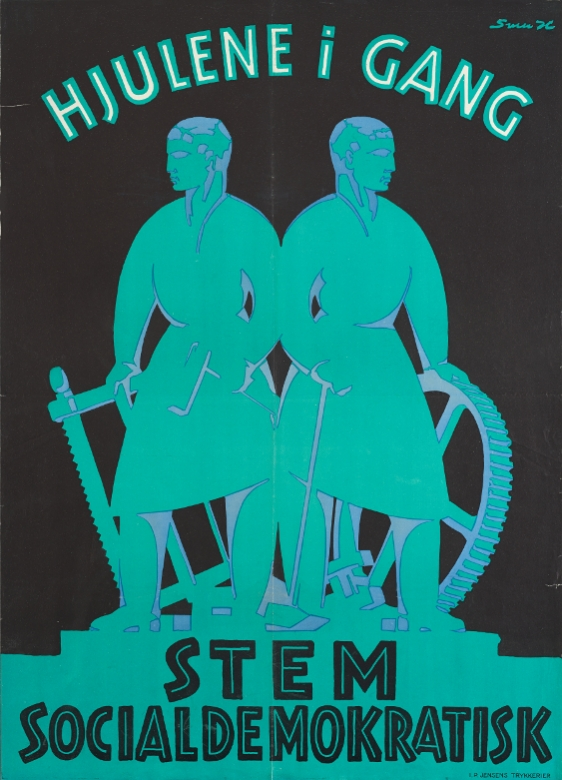
"Make the Wheels Turn" (1926)

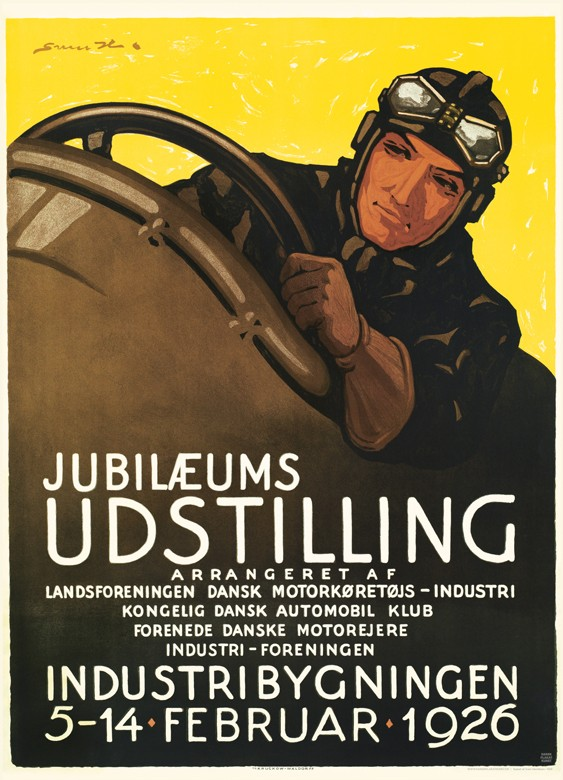
Jubilæumsudstillingen (1926)

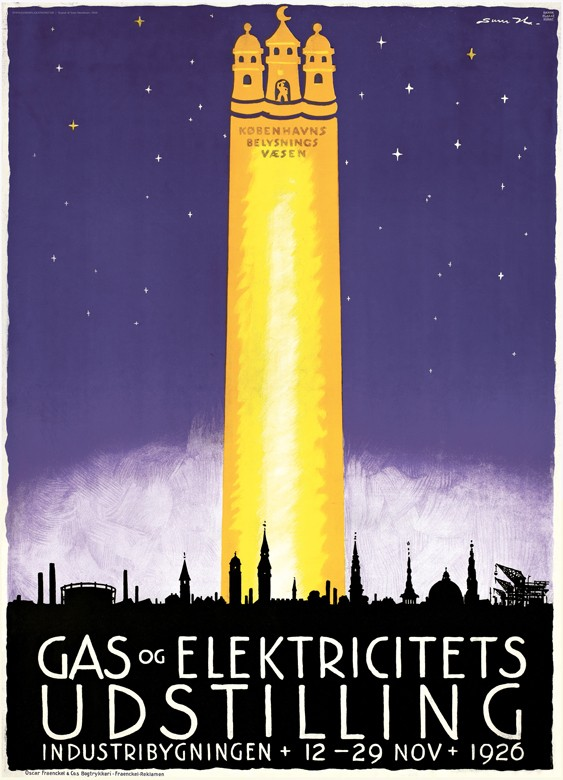
Gas and Electricity Exhibition (1926)

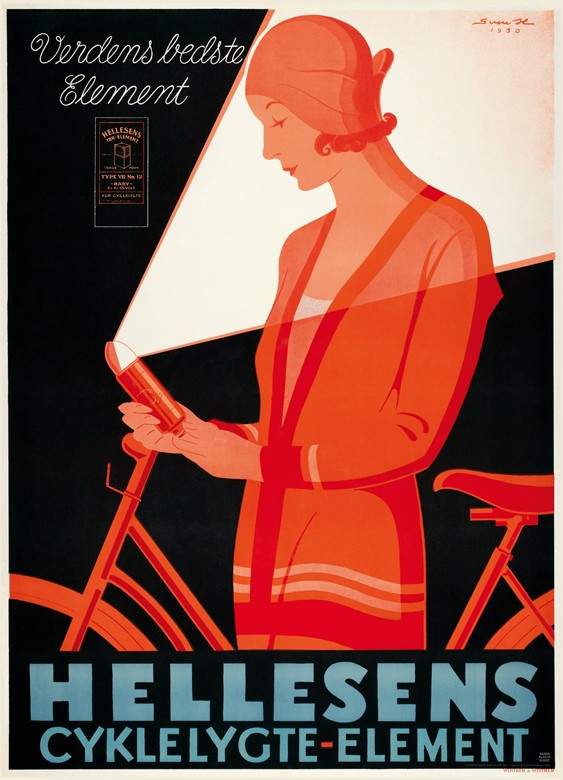
Hellesens Cykellygte-Element (1930)

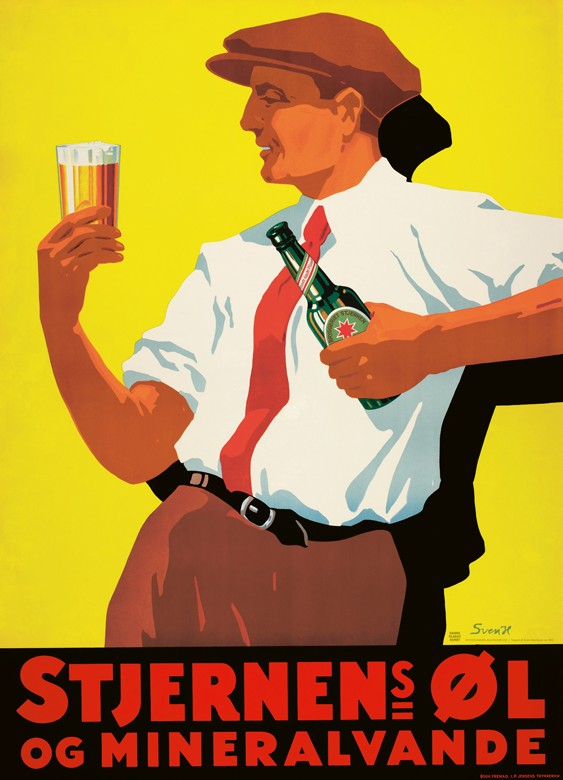
Stjernen Beer and Mineral Water (1932)

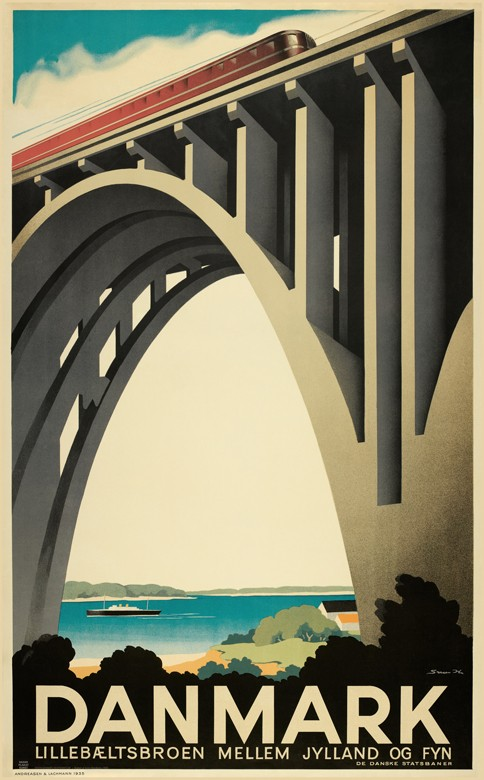
Little Belt Bridge (1935)

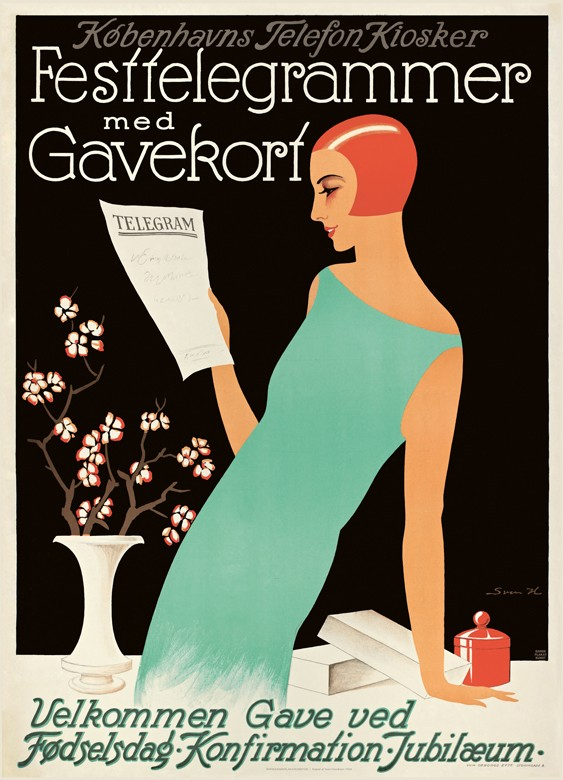
A/S Københavns Telefonkiosker's greeting telegrams (1926)
