= Vallekilde Folk High School =

Adult educational institution in Denmark

Coordinates: 55.7435°N 11.4293°E

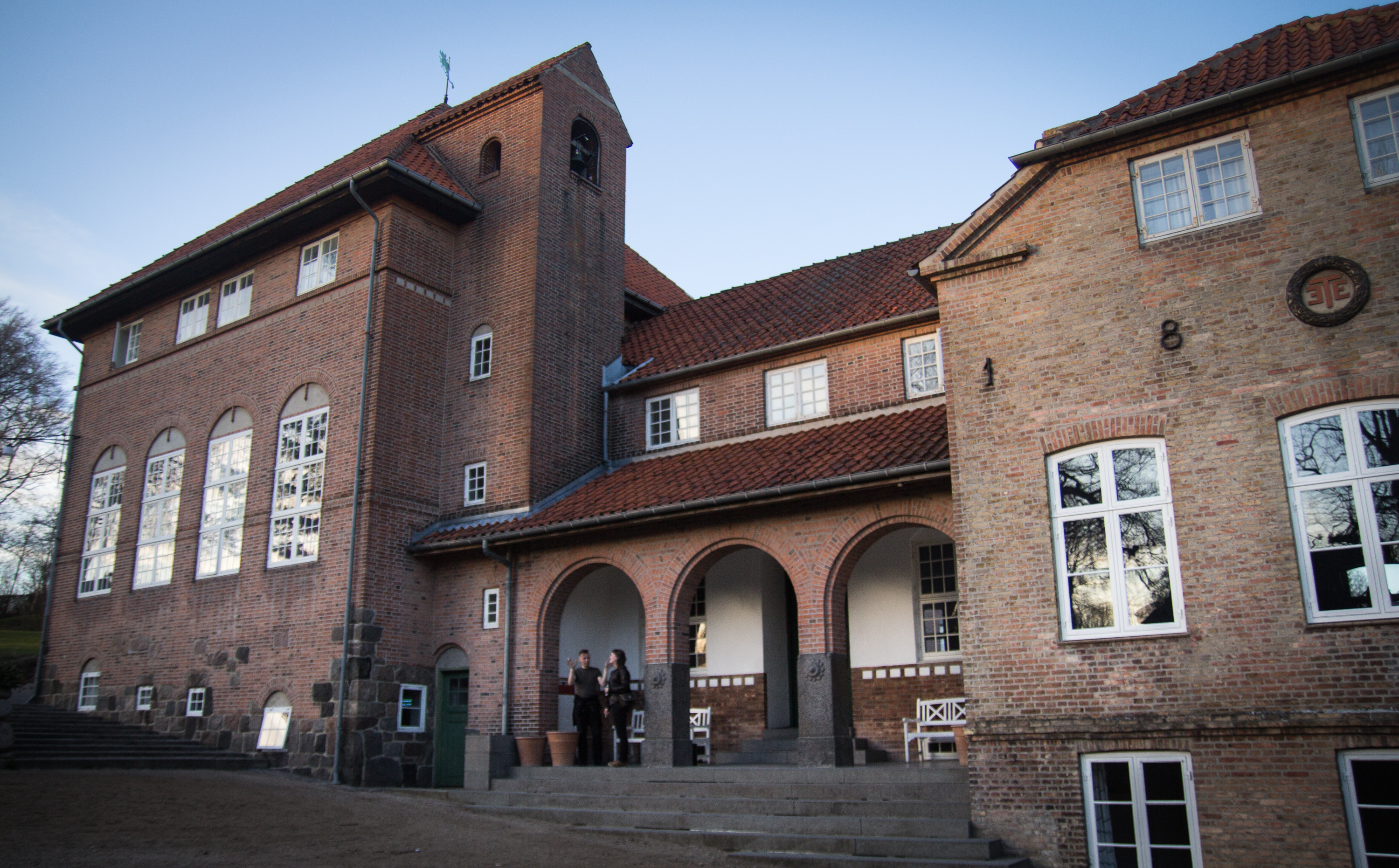
Vallekilde Folk High School (2013)

Vallekilde Folk High School (Danish: Vallekilde Højskole) is a Danish institution of adult education in the folk high school tradition. The school is located in the village of Vallekilde in Odsherred municipality on the island of Zealand.

== History ==
The school was founded in 1865 by the theologian Ernst Trier (1837–1893) who worked in the tradition of N. F. S. Grundtvig (1783–1872) who is seen as the spiritual figure behind the many folk high schools that were founded in Denmark during the second part of the 19th and the 20th century.

The school was started in rented rooms at a farm in Vallekilde. In 1866 first part of the new school building opened its doors to the students. The building had significant new elements added in 1876, 1884, 1907 and 1962. Architect Martin Nyrop (1849–1921) who is known as the architect behind the Copenhagen City Hall designed the gym from 1884 and the northern wing from 1907.

== Current activities ==
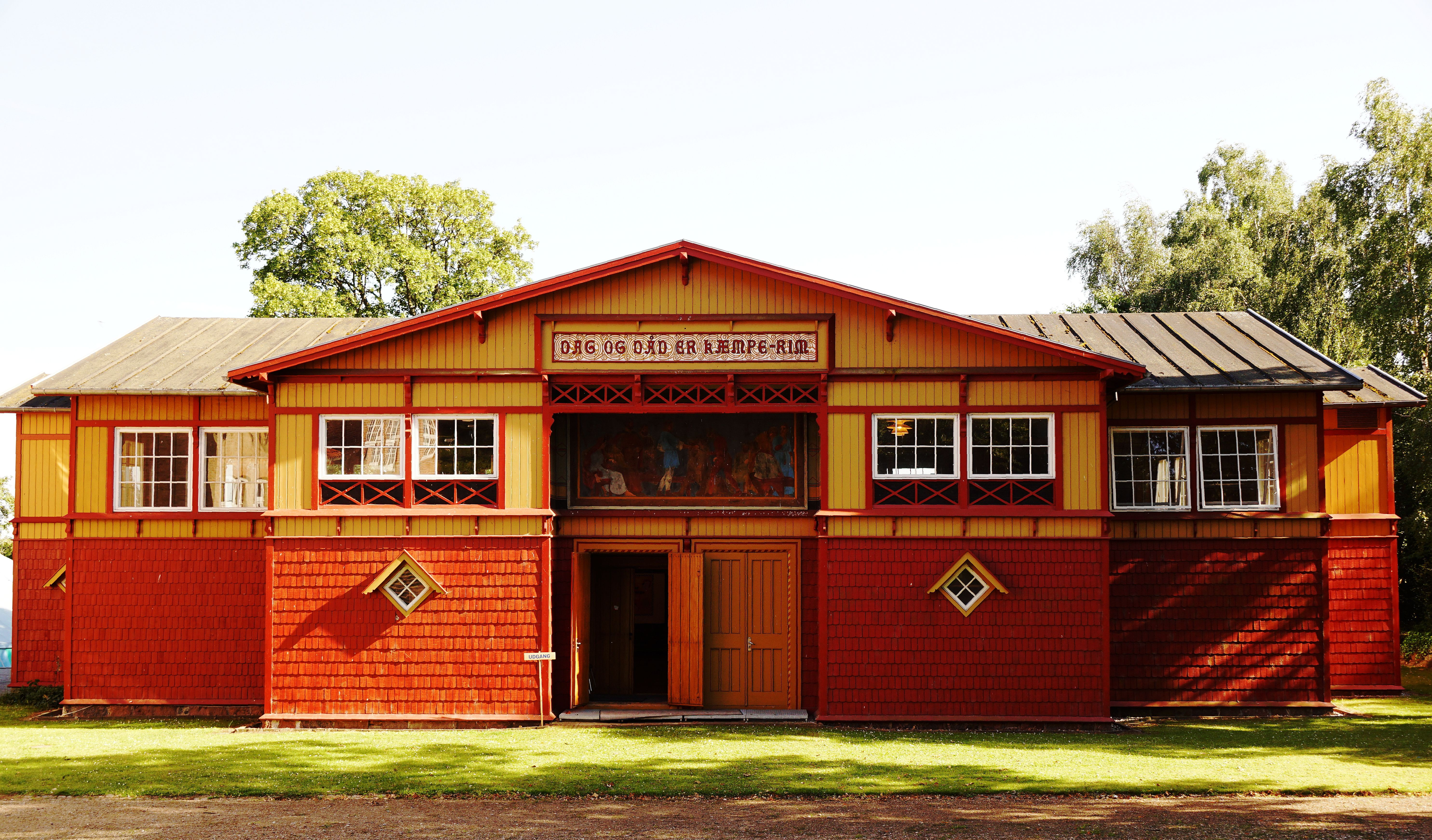
Ævekseshuset

Since 2003, Vallekilde Folk High School has also been known under its English name: Vallekilde Communications College. It has specialized in communication and currently has five line subjects. Journalism, Design, Leadership, Game design and Event management. These lines attracts students from all over the world and is a stepping stone for the students to attend a university.
