= Kultorvet =

Square in Copenhagen, Denmark

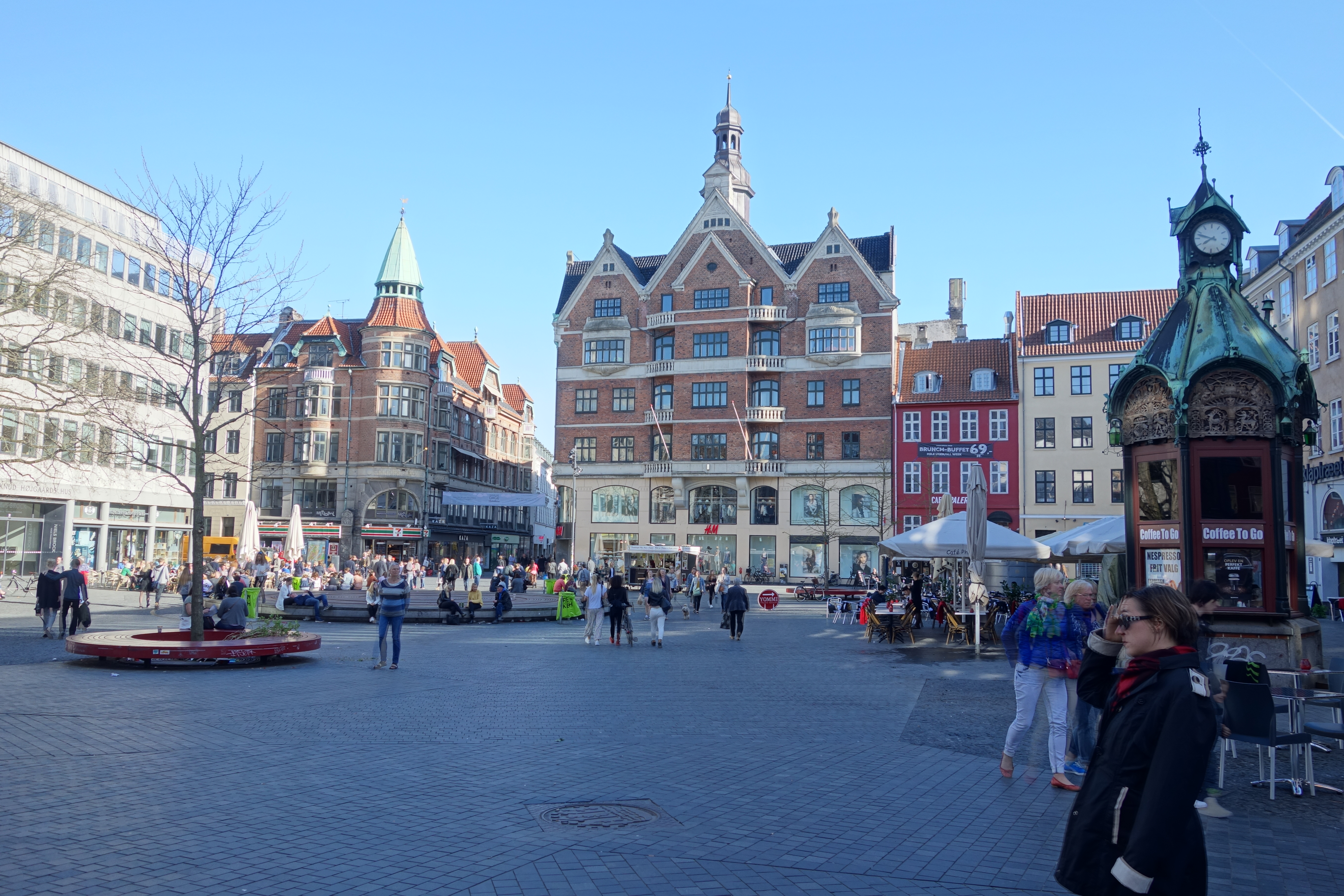
- Købmagergade in 2014
- Interactive map of Kultorvet
- Location: Indre By, Copenhagen, Denmark
- Postal code: 1175
- Nearest metro station: Nørreport
- Coordinates: 55°40′57″N 12°34′26.76″E

Kultorvet (literally "The Coal Market") is a public square in the Old Town of Copenhagen, Denmark. Together with Købmagergade and the southern part of Frederiksborggade, it forms a pedestrian zone between Nørreport station and Amagertorv on Strøget. The square is lined with cafés and shops and is a popular venue for outdoor concerts in the summer time. Copenhagen Central Library was from the 1950s based on the square but has now relocated to a building in Krystalgade. Its old building has now been taken over by Niels Brock Copenhagen Business College.

== History ==
=== 18th century ===
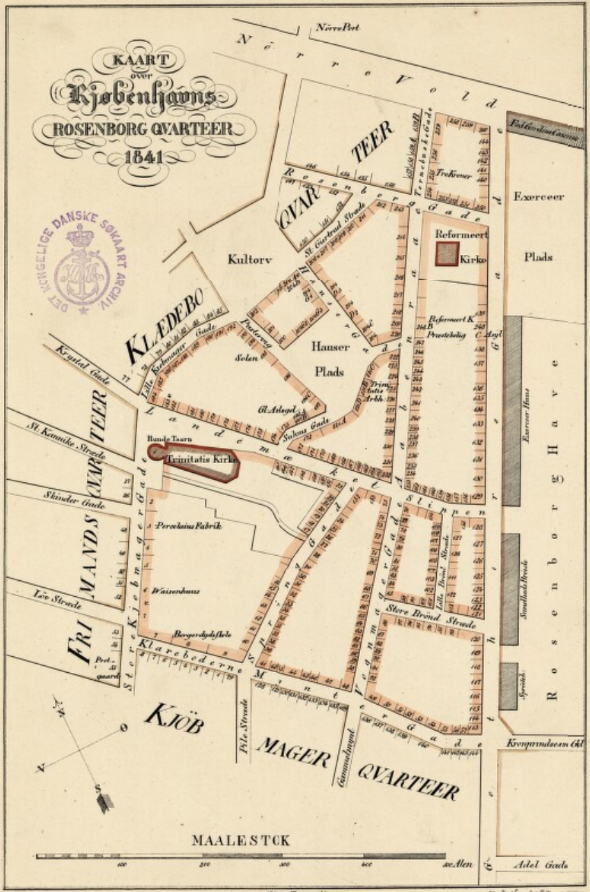
Kultorvet seen on an 1841 map of Rosenborg Quarter

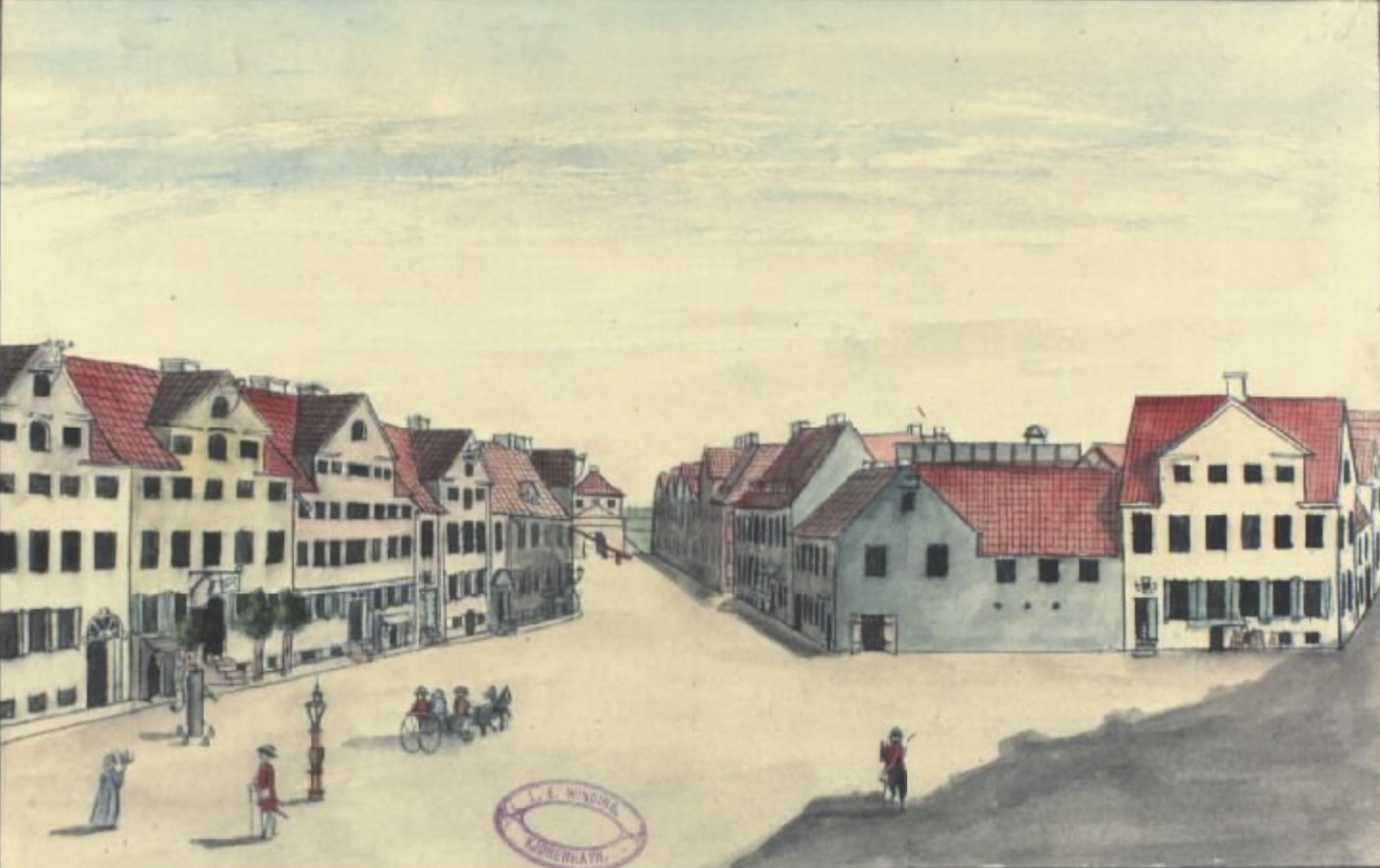
Kultorvet in 1736

Kultorvet was created after the Copenhagen Fire of 1728 which destroyed a large part of the city. It was initially known as Ny Nørre Torv oven for Rundetårn ("New North Market above the Round Tower"). The current, more easy-on-the-tongue name gradually took over, referring to the market trade which dominated the site. Prior to the fire, trade in charcoal, fire wood and peat had taken place just inside the Northern City Gate, a practical location since it was controlled by colliers, peat gatherers and farmers from the forest-clad North Zealand.

The original market square was considerably smaller but its area has gradually been increased in connection with demolitions and construction of new buildings.

=== 19th century ===
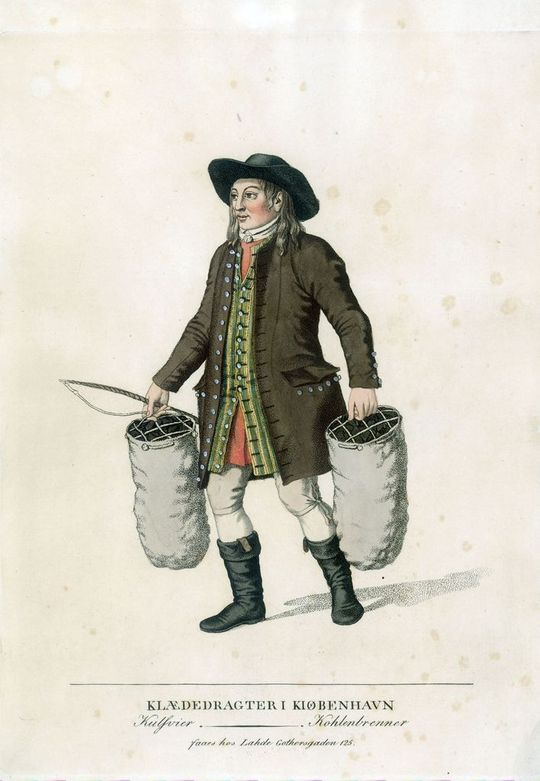
Collier at Kultorvet, c. 1805

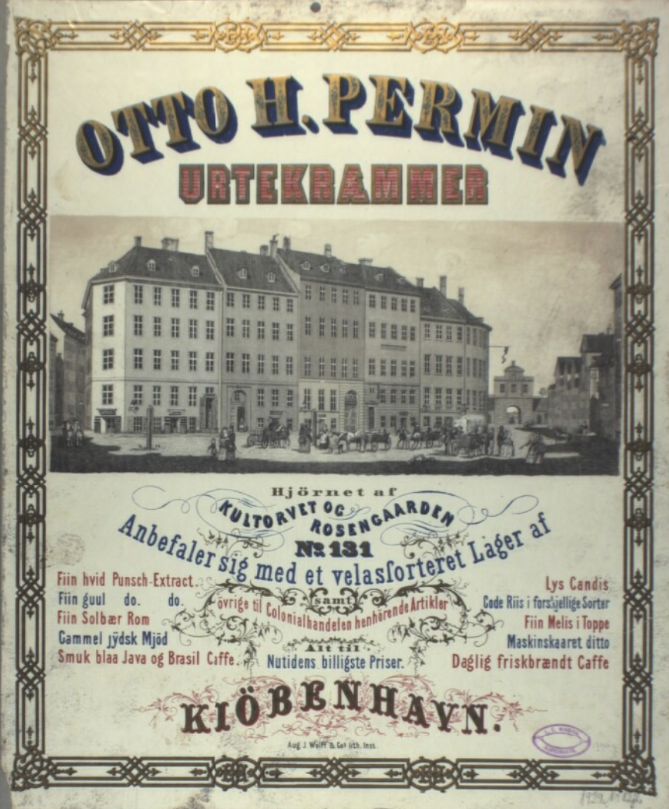
Advertisement for Otto H. Permin, a grocery store (urtekram). The drawing is by H. G. F. Holm, 1856

.

T. M. Werner, a hardware and kitchenware wholesaler, opened at No. 4 on 1 June 1855. In 1950 it was still based at the site. One of the most well-known stores on the square was Francis Zachariae's clothing store. It opened on 16 October 1874 and was still based there in 1950.

Københavns Sporveje's Line 12 trams passed the square from 7 December 1895 on their way between Søtorvet and Amagertorv.

Kultorvet was pedestrianised and cleared of parking places in 1973 following the successful pedestrianisation of Strøget in the early 1960s.

=== 20th and 21st century ===
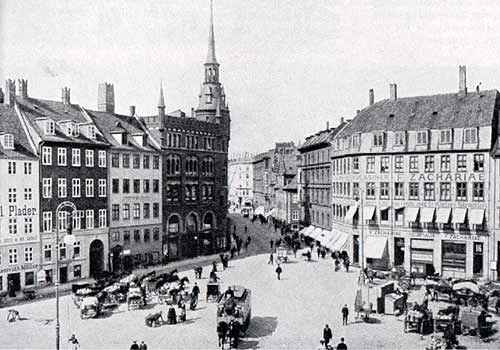
Kultorvet in 1895

The buildings on both sides of Købmagergade were replaced by modern buildings in the 1900s. A new building for Copenhagen Central Library was built on the east side of the square in 1957.

The square was refurbished between 2011 and 2013 together with the rest of the pedestrian zone and Hauser Plads on the other side of the Library House. The new square was designed by Polyform.

== The square ==
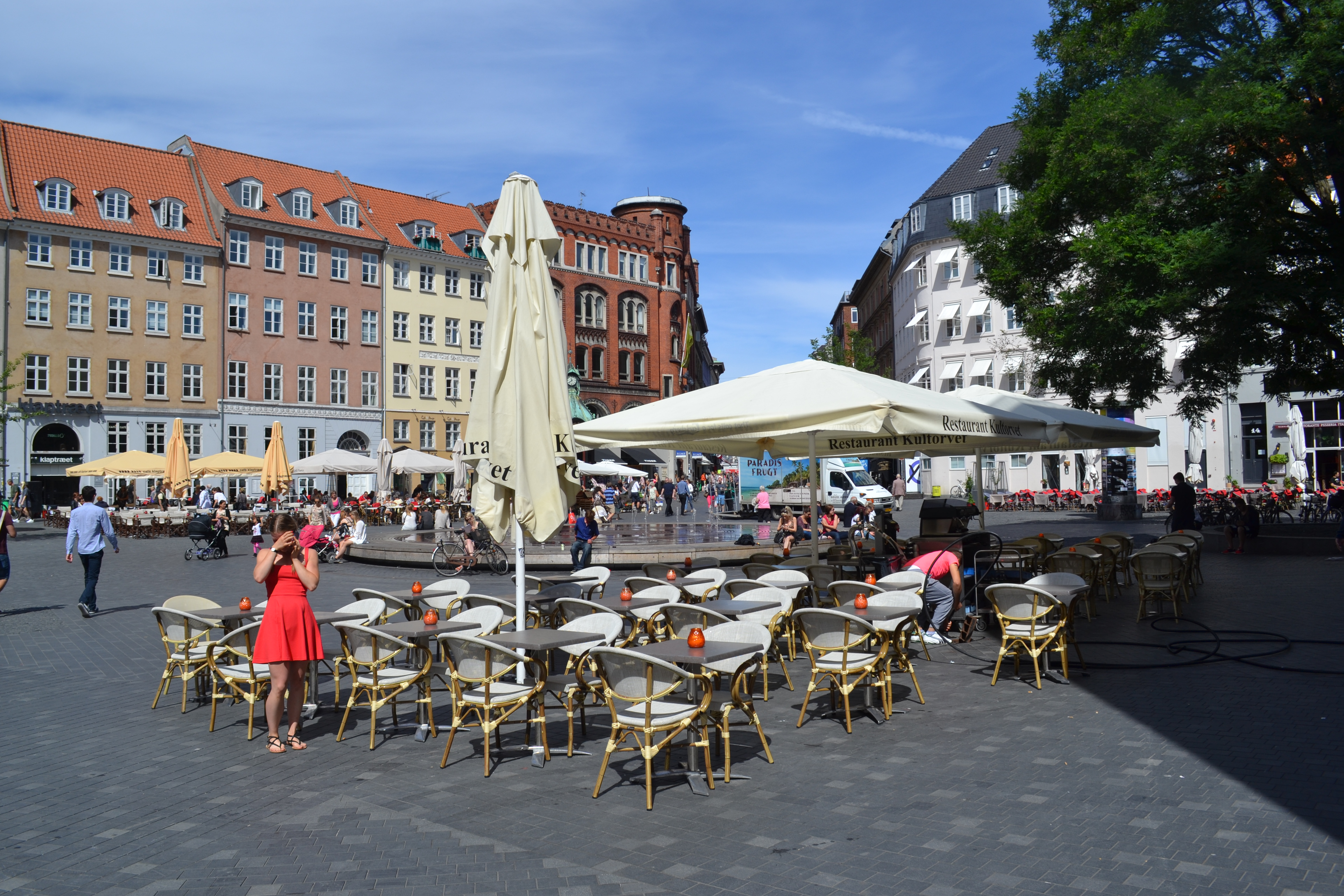
Kultorvet, looking towards Frederiksborggade

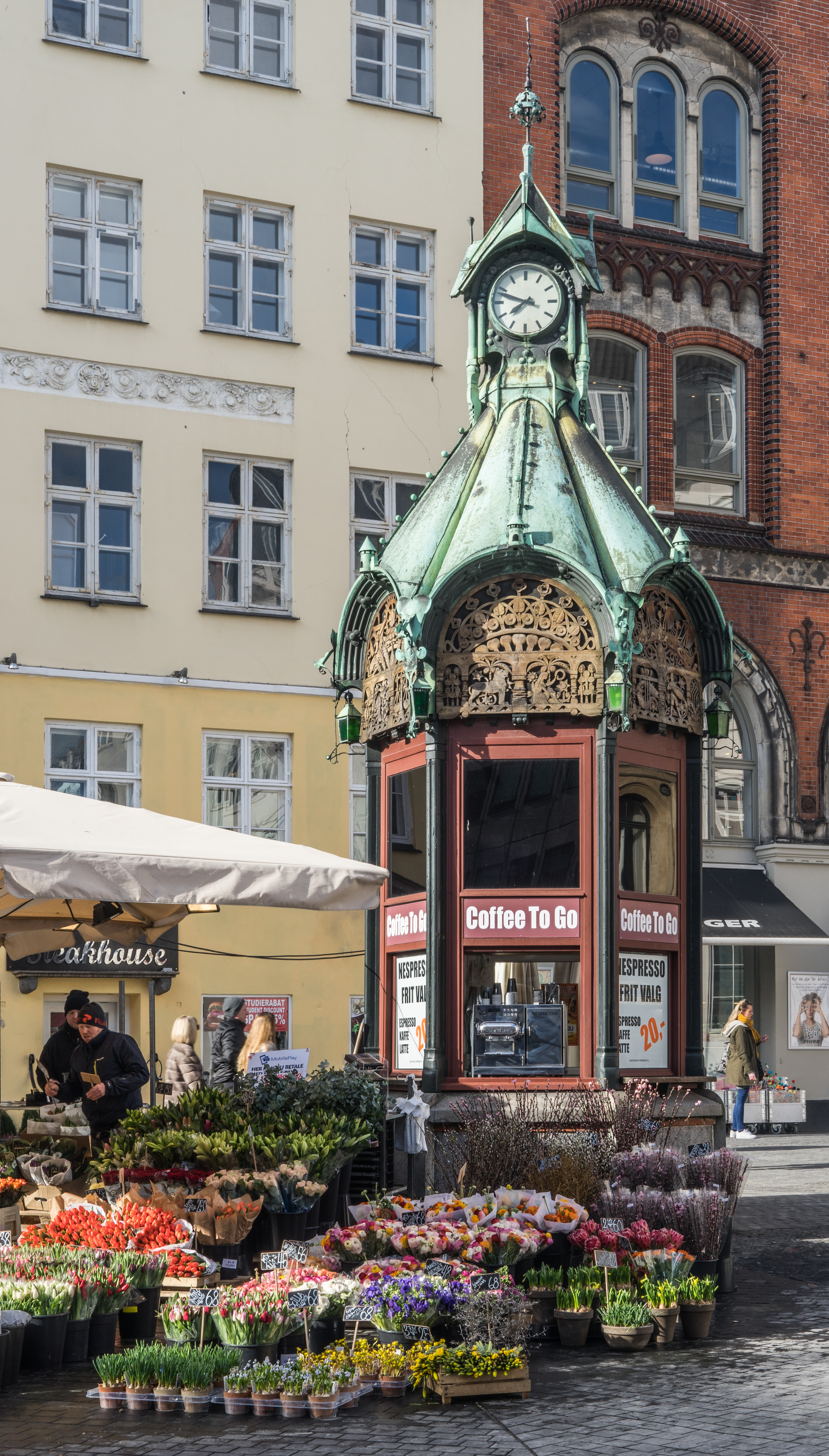
Old kiosk

The 2013 renovation installed a large, circular water feature which doubles as a band stand for special events.

One of Copenhagen's old telephone kiosks is found on the square. It was installed and operated by A/S Kjøbenhavns Telefonkiosker.

On the square is Hanne Varming's bronze statue The Elder Mother (Hyldemor), presenting an elderly couple seated on a bench in quiet contemplation. The statue takes its name after Hans Christian Andersen's tale of the same name from 1851 but was also inspired by a memory of the artist's own great grand parents.

== Architecture ==
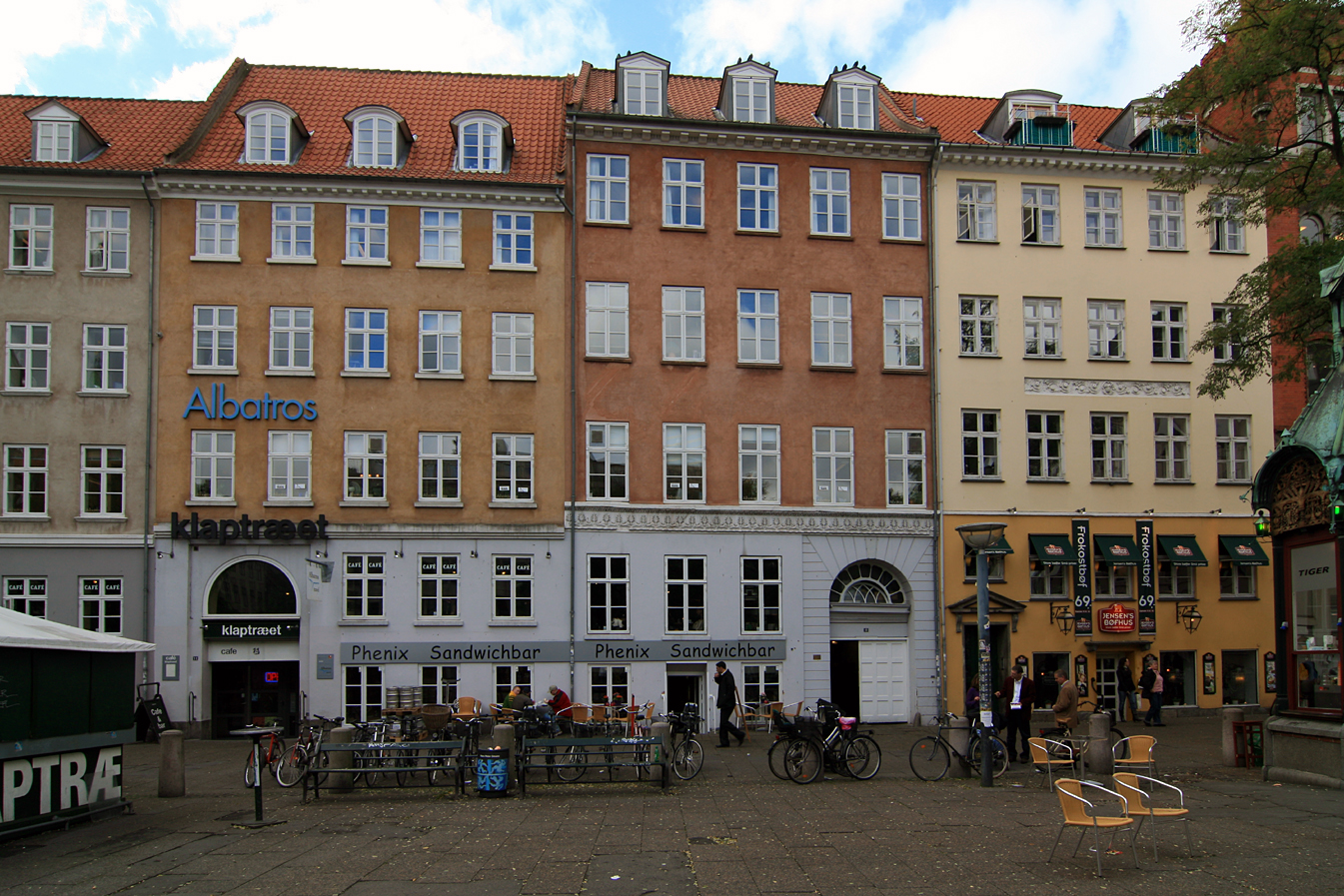
Buildings on south side of square.

Built in the 1730, No. 14 on the corner with Sankt Gertruds Stræde is the only building of the square that survives from the rebuilding of the square in the years after the Fire of 1728. No. 5, 7, 9–11 and 15 (designed by Christian Frederik Hansen) all date from the 1810s.

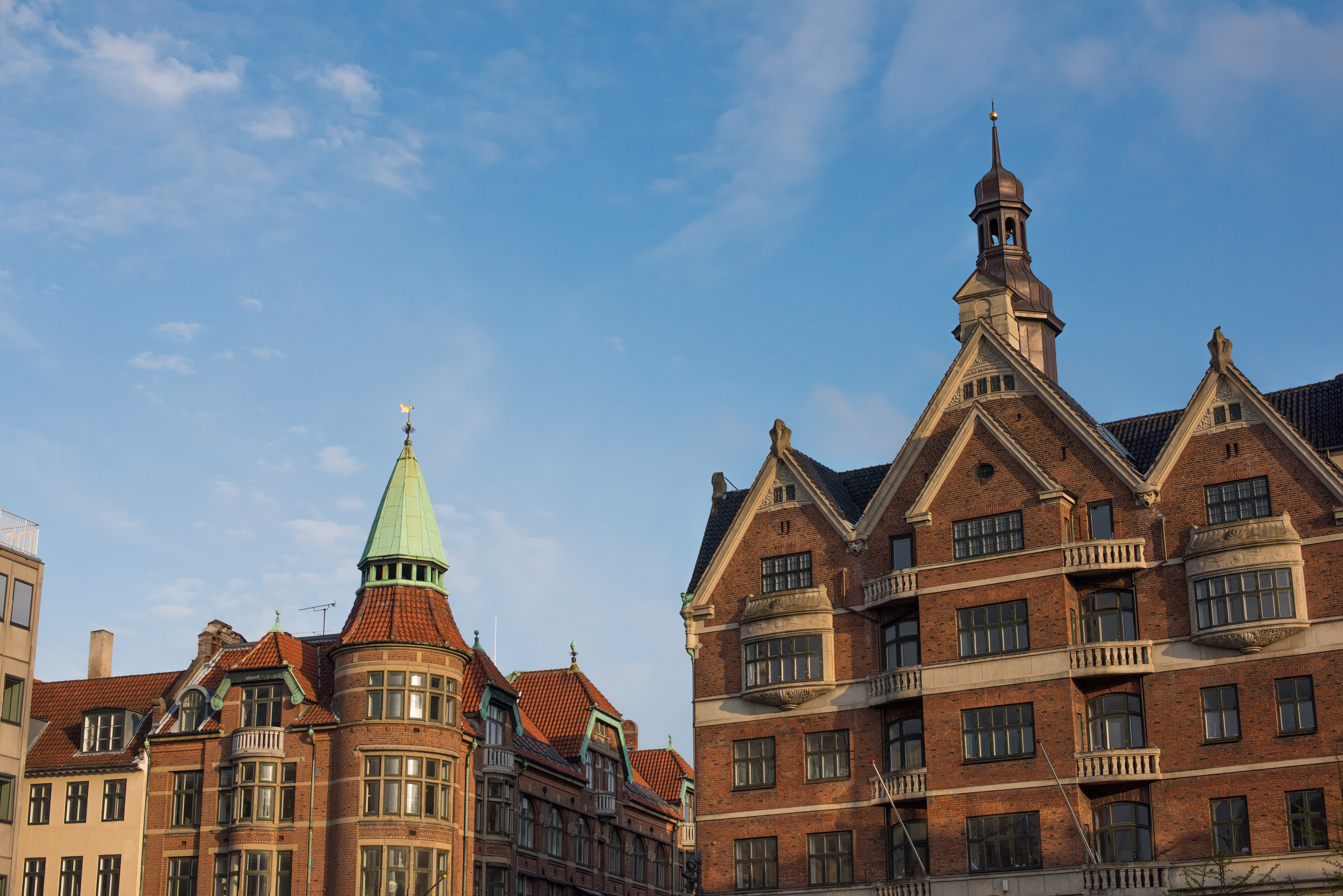
The building on the corner of Kultorvet and Købmagergade (right) and the Messen Building

No. 17 is the former Kultorvet Pharmacy. The Historicist building is from 1895 and was designed by Valdemar Ingemann. It was originally topped by a tall spire but it was dismantled after a few years The building on the corner of Købmagergade, also in the Historiccist style, is from 1908.

The former Copenhagen Central Library (No. 2) is now home to one of several campuses of the Niels Brock Copenhagen Business College.

== Transport ==
The nearest railway station is Nørreport station. It is served both by S-train and the Copenhagen Metro M1 and M2 lines.
