= Vesterbros Torv =

Public square in Copenhagen, Denmark

Coordinates: 55.6721°N 12.5552°E

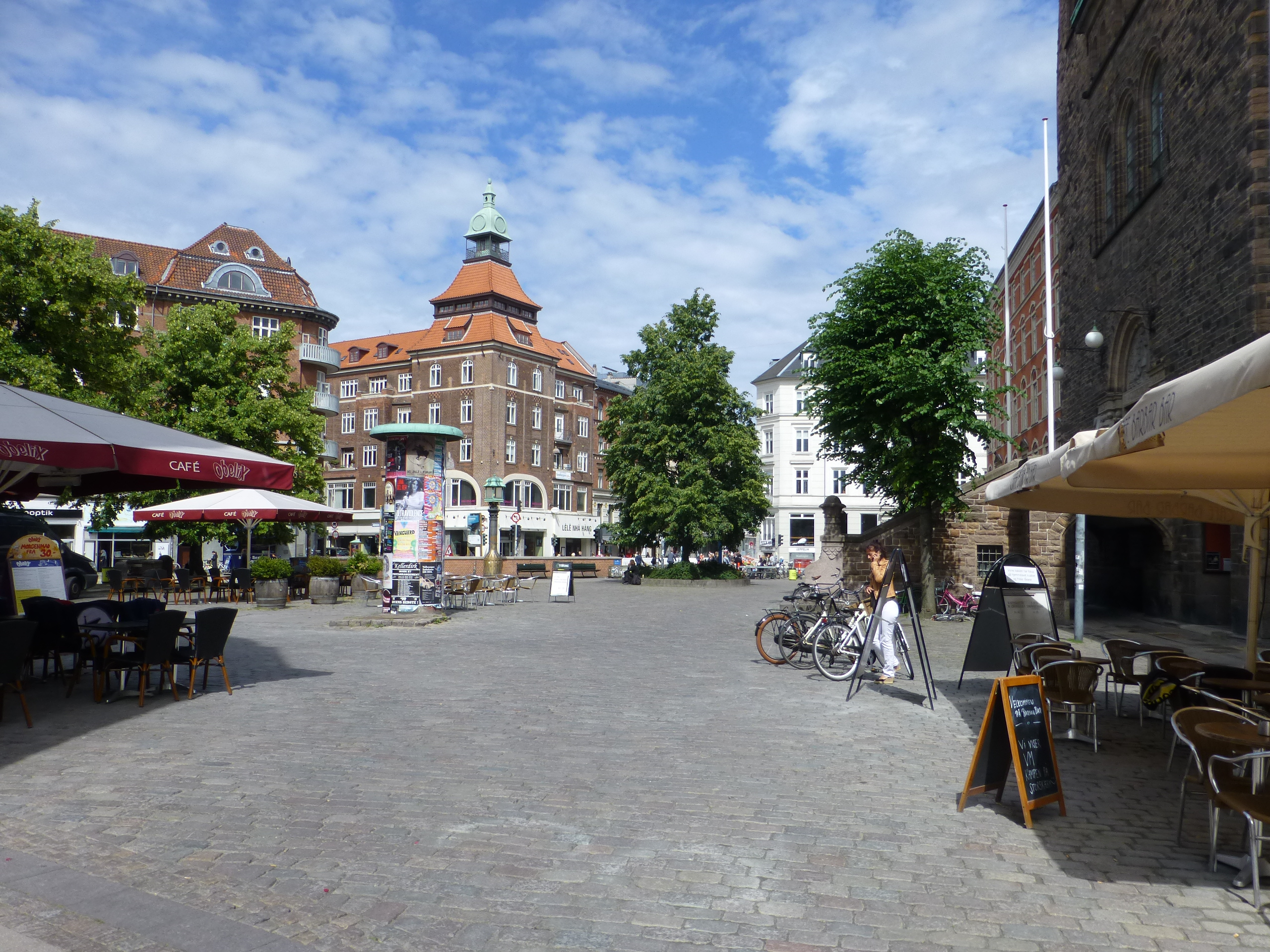
Vesterbros Torv

Vesterbros Torv is a public square located at the corner of Vesterbrogade and Gasværksvej in the heart of the Vesterbro district of Copenhagen, Denmark. It is dominated by Elijah's Church.

== History and architecture ==
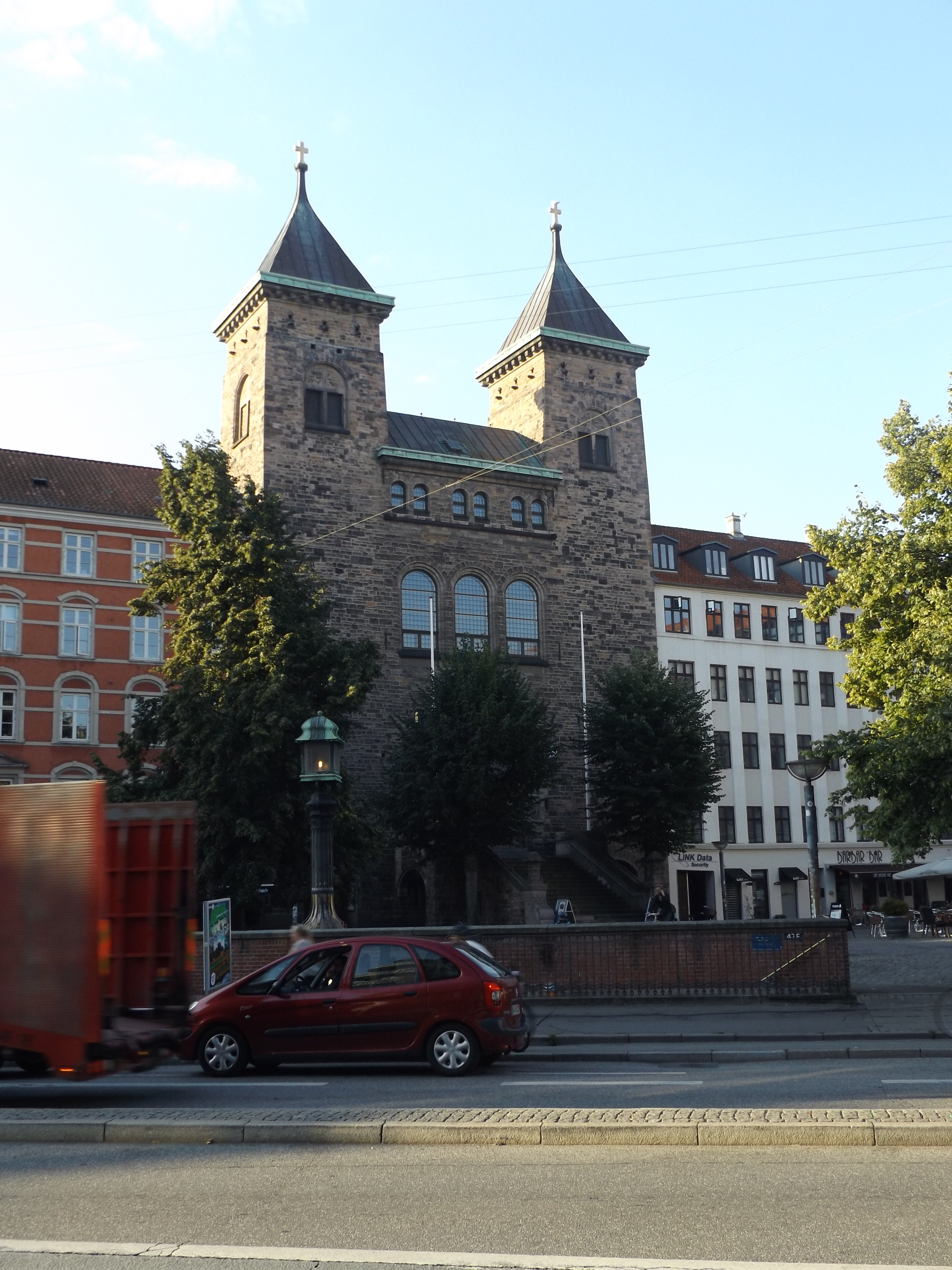
The churchside

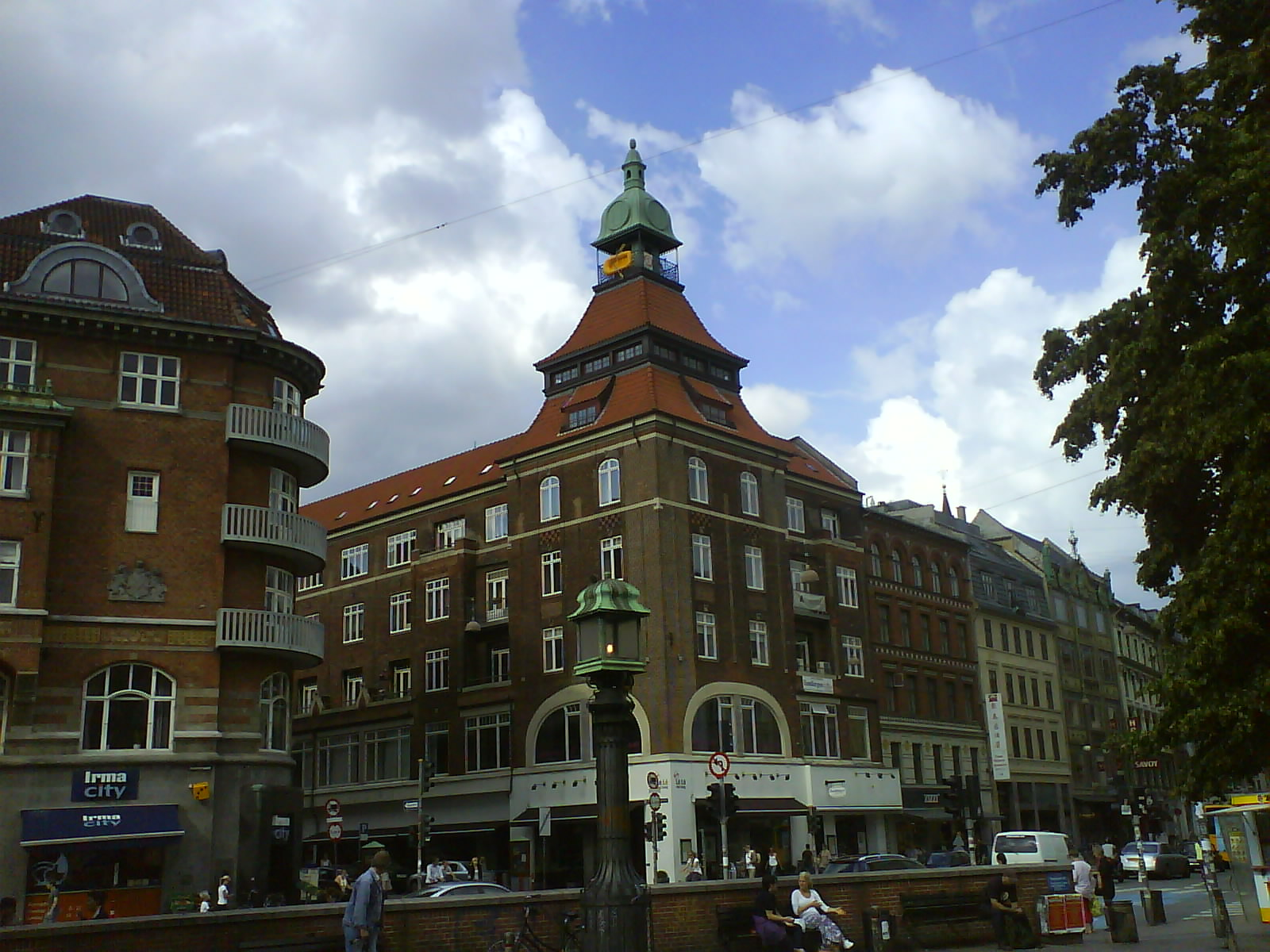
Vesterbros Torv seen from the other side

The square was established in 1850. Its triangular shape of the space was determined by a series of rope walks which used to be located at the site. The two buildings which flank Elijah's Church date from the establishment of the square.

The church was completed as an infill in 1907. It is designed by Martin Nyrop.

On the opposite side of the square, the two buildings which flank the passageway which passes through The New Theatre, one of them with a characteristic tower, was built as part of the large theatre complex. The theatre was inaugurated in 1908 and is built to a design which mixes Art Nouveaux with other styles.

== Features ==
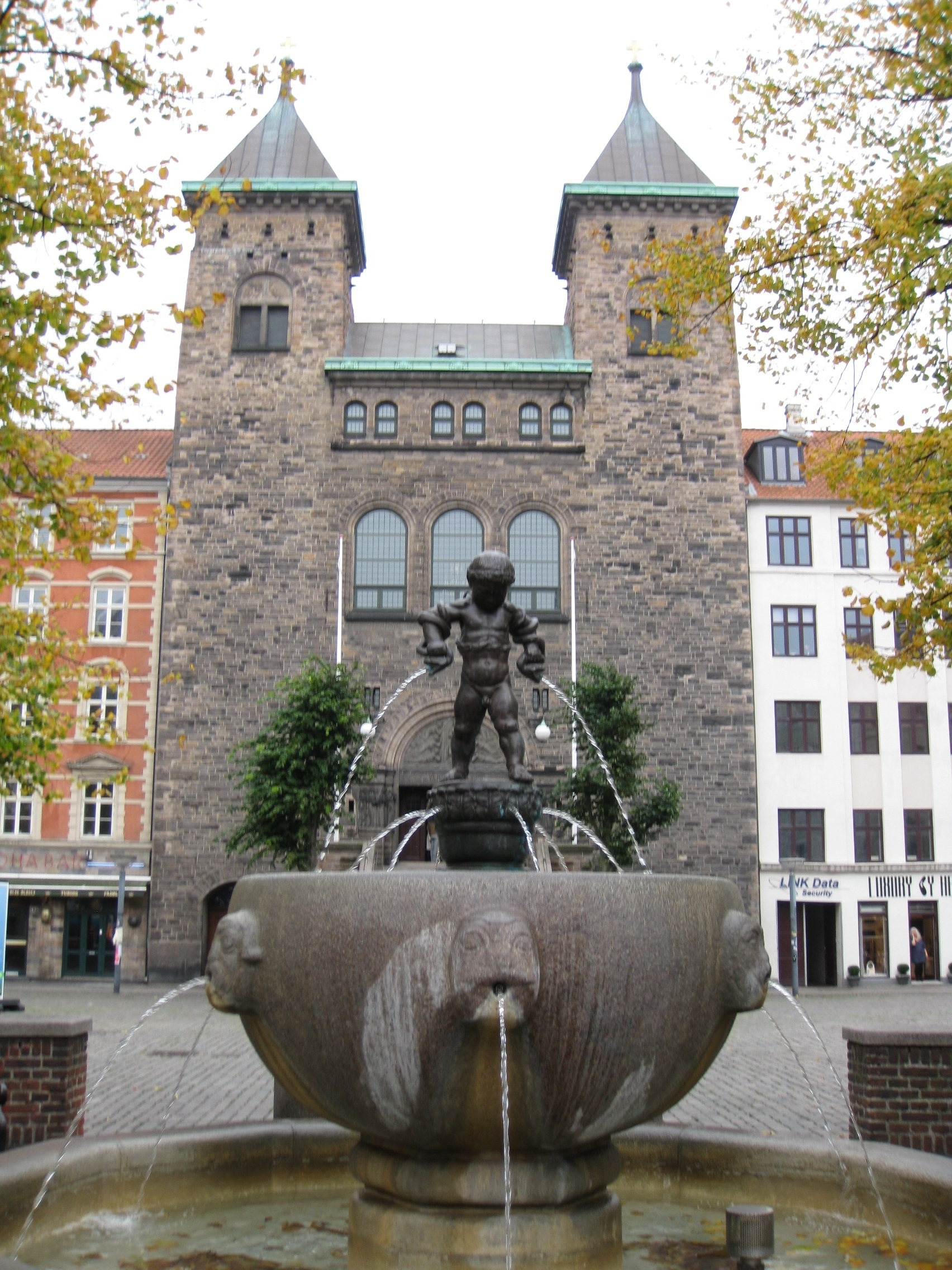
The Hercules Fountain

=== Hercules Fountain ===
The Hercules Fountain dates from 1915 and was a gift from the society Hovedstadens forskønnelse. It was designed by the sculptor Rasmus Harboe who had previously created the reliefs on the facade of Elijah's Church.

=== Memorial plaque ===
A plaque on No. 55A commemorates the World War II resistance fighter Erik Koch Michelsen. He was shot at the site on 3 March 1945.

=== Underground lavatories ===
In 1901 city architect Ludvig Fenger fitted the square with underground lavatories. Similar facilities were constructed at the City Hall Square, Amagertorv and Nyhavn.
