= Rasmus Harboe =

Danish sculptor (1868–1952)

Rasmus Harboe (25 October 1868 in Skælskør – 4 June 1952 in Frederiksberg) was a Danish sculptor. He was a frequent collaborator with several of the leading Danish architects of his time, including Martin Nyrop.

== Early life and education ==
Harboe was born in Skælskør the son of ship-owner and industrialist Rasmus Jens Brændekilde Hilfgott Harbie (1828–96) and Olivia Sabine Rasmussen (1837–95). His father owned Skælskør Steam Mill.

Harboe studied under Stephan Sinding from 1881. In 1891, he followed Sinding to Paris, where he remained until 1892. In 1898–99, he spent a year in Florence and Rome on a stipend from Anchers Legat. He was inspired by the country's Renaissance sculpture as well as by Greek art.

== Career ==
Harboe had his debut at the Salon in Paris in 1892 and later exhibited at Charlottenborg in Copenhagen.

From 1907 until 1920, Harboe collaborated routinely with architects such as Martin Nyrop, Hack Kampmann and Martin Borsch, creating reliefs and other statuary for their buildings. He designed the Hercules Fountain at Vesterbros Torv in Copenhagen (1913–15) and created ceramic works for the porcelain manufacturer Aluminia.

The death of his wife Ellen Augusta Rohde (born 10 October 1870 in Copenhagen) on 3 December 1936 in Nykøbing Sjælland induced him to terminate his artistic career.

He and his wife are buried at Assistens Kirkegård in Copenhagen.

== Personal life ==
Harboe married on 12 May 1910 in the Garrison Church Ellen Augusta Rohde (1870–1936), daughter of army officer Theodor Gudmann Rohde (1835–1924) and Ingeborg Johanne Ragnhilda Smidt (1842–1911).

== Awards ==
Harboe received the Eckersberg Medal in 1914 and the Thorvaldsen Medal in 1948.

== List of works ==
=== Public art ===
- Justitia, Old Town Hall, Gammeltorv, 4230 Skælskør (1896)
- Jens Vestergaard. Søanlægget, Søvej, Farsø (1907)
- Glæden ved genvundet helbred; Kærligheden mod de syge. Bispebjerg Hospital, Copenhagen (1913)
- Hercules Fountain, Vesterbros Torv, Copenhagen (1915)
- Philip Schou memorial, Smallegade 45, Frederiksberg, Copenhagen

=== Aluminias ===
- Tivoli figurines
  - Columbine figurine (1906)
  - Harlikin figurine (1906)
  - Kassander figurine (1909)
  - Pjerrot figurine
- Carnival figurines
  - Boy with Monkey
  - Princess
  - Prince
  - Spanish Dancer
- Christimas relief (1024)

== Gallery ==
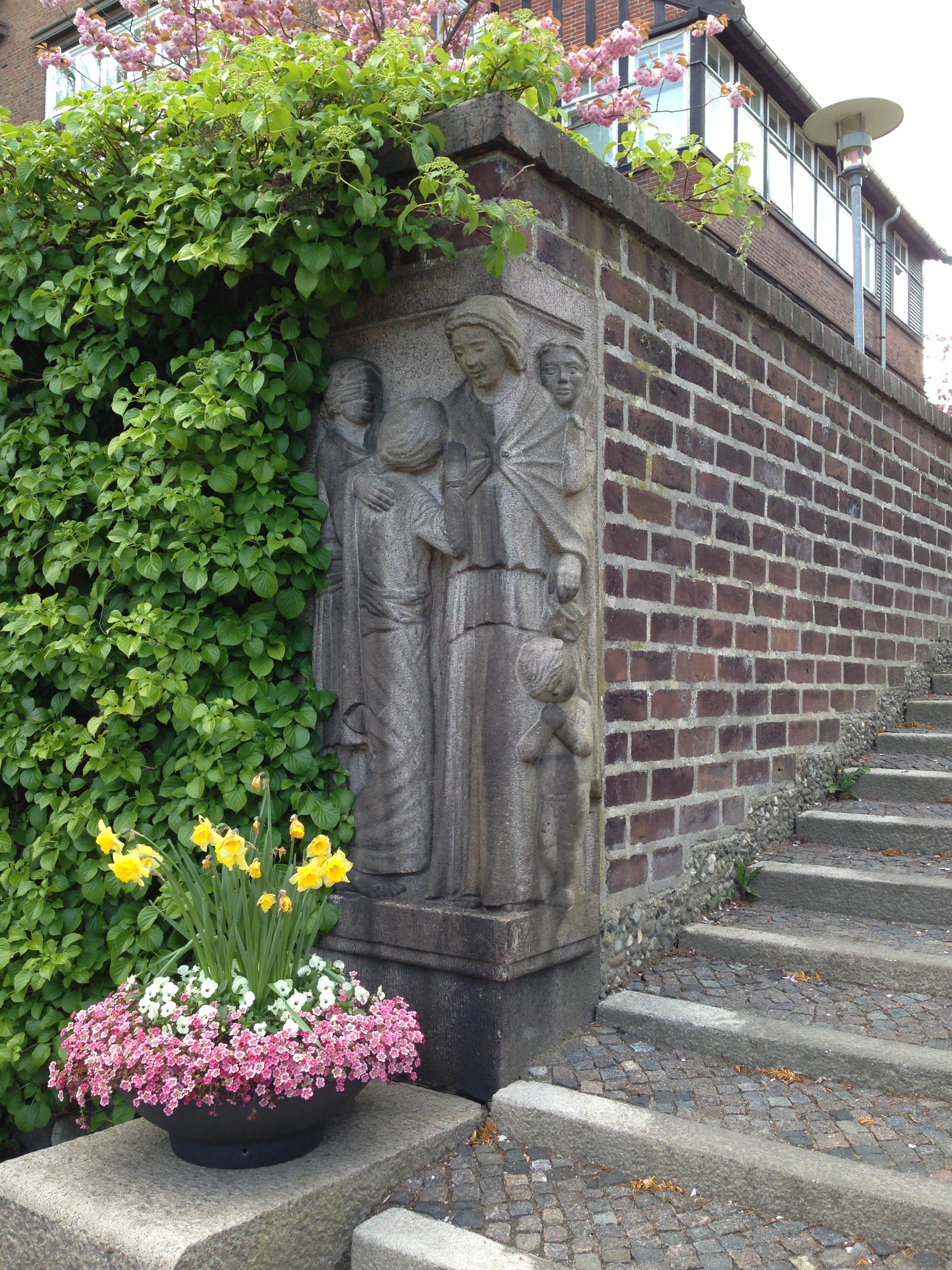
Bispebjerg Hospital, Copenhagen (1913)

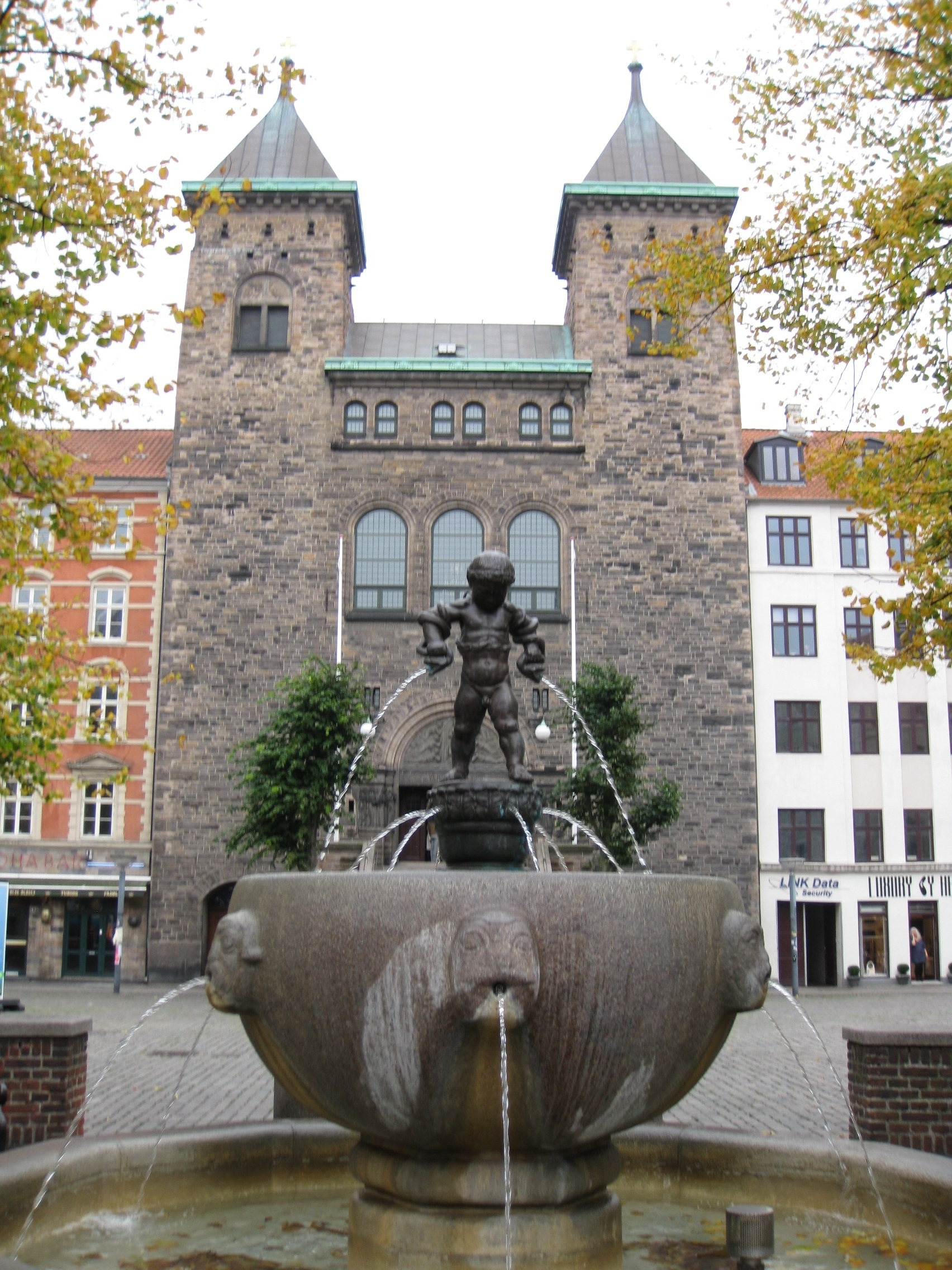
Hercules Fountain, Copenhagen (1915)
