= Martin Nyrop =

Danish architect (1849–1921)

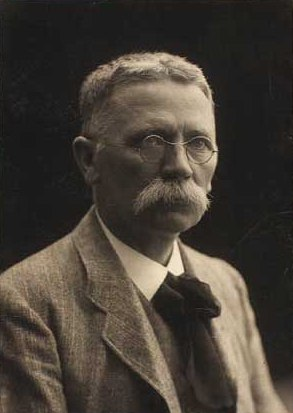
- Martin Nyrop
- Born: 11 November 1849; Holmsland, Denmark
- Died: 18 May 1921 (aged 71); Copenhagen, Denmark
- Education: Royal Danish Academy of Fine Arts
- Occupation: Architect
- Children: Ernestine Nyrop
- Buildings: Copenhagen City Hall

Signature
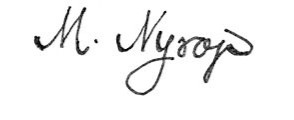

Martin Nyrop (11 November 1849 – 18 May 1921) was a Danish architect.

== Early life and education ==
Nyrop was born on 11 November 1849 at Holmsland, Ringkøbing, the son of parish priest Christopher Nyrop (1805–1879) and Helene Ahlmann (1807–1874).

He attended Sorø Academy and matriculated from the Royal Danish Academy of Fine Arts in 1876. From 1881 to 1883, he studied abroad on a scholarship from the academy.

== Career ==
From 1883 to 1893, Nyrop worked as an assistant for professor Hans Jørgen Holm but was at the same time able to work on his personal commissions. Most of his early independent works were single-family detached homes.

He experienced a breakthrough when he won the competition for the design of the buildings at the Nordic Exhibition of 1888. He constructed all his exhibition pavilions of wood at a time when iron and glass was favored for temporary structures. He justified the decision by claiming the result would be prettier for the same cost. His background as a carpenter may have been an influence and it gave him the opportunity to showcase his ideals of quality materials and visible construction principles.

From 1888 to 1891, he served on the Copenhagen City Council.

Nyrop was awarded the Grand Prix for design at the Exposition Universelle at Paris in 1900. In 1906, he became a professor at the Academy of Fine Arts School of Architecture and served as director of the Academy of Fine Arts for periods between 1908 and 1918.

Nyrop designed the Copenhagen City Hall (1905) in National Romantic style and the majority of the buildings for the Nordic Industrial, Agricultural and Art Exhibition in Copenhagen (1888).

== Personal life ==
Nyrop married Louise Frederikke Laub (born 1851), daughter of parish priest Hans Jørgen Trojel Laub (1817–1863) and Ernestine Laub née Linnemann (1827–1885), on 15 August 1885 in Trinitatis Church in Copenhagen. Their children included daughter Ernestine Nyrop.

== Selected buildings ==
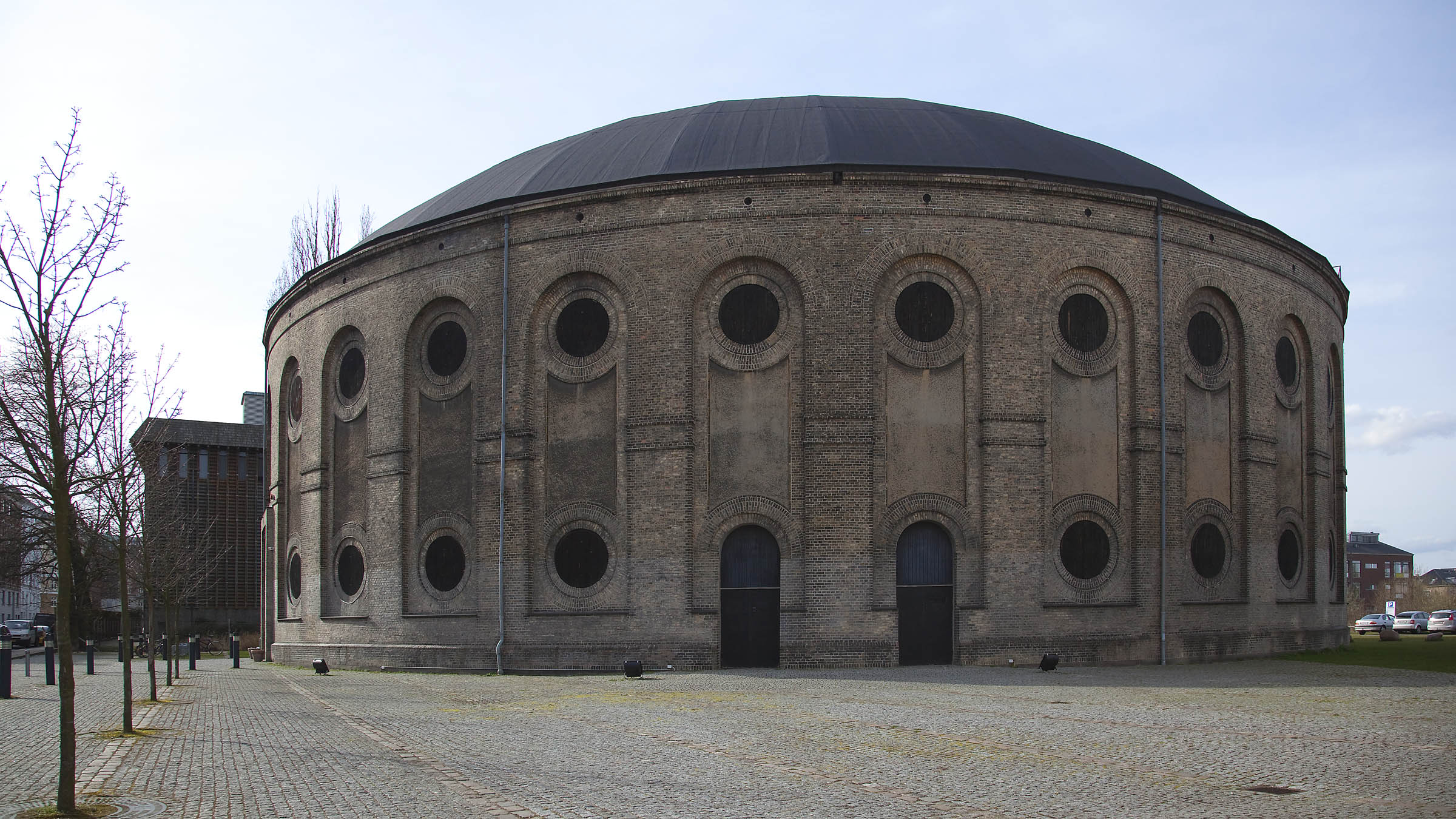
Østre Gasværk Theatre, Copenhagen

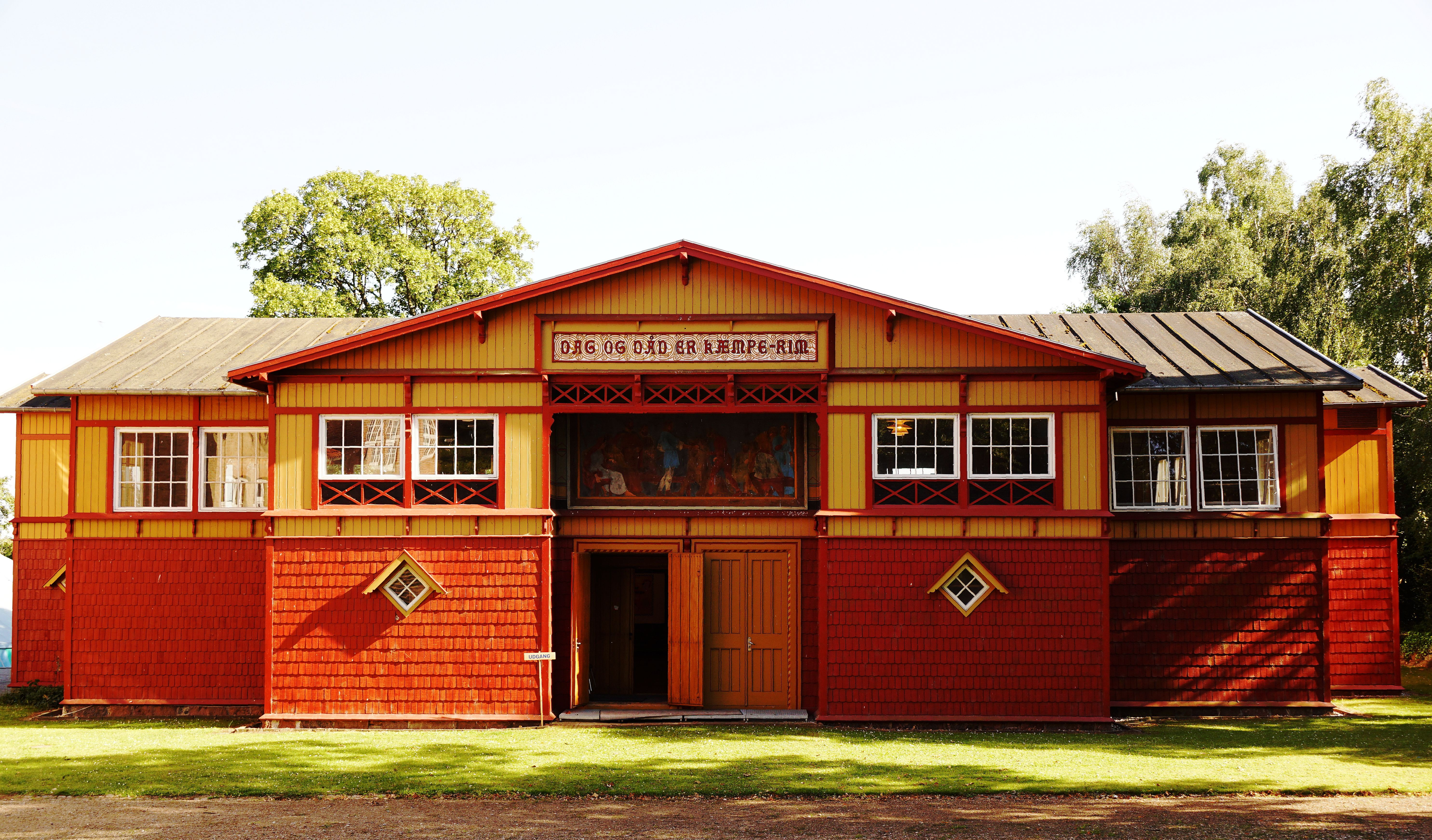
Øvelseshuset, Vallekilde Folk High School, Vallekilde

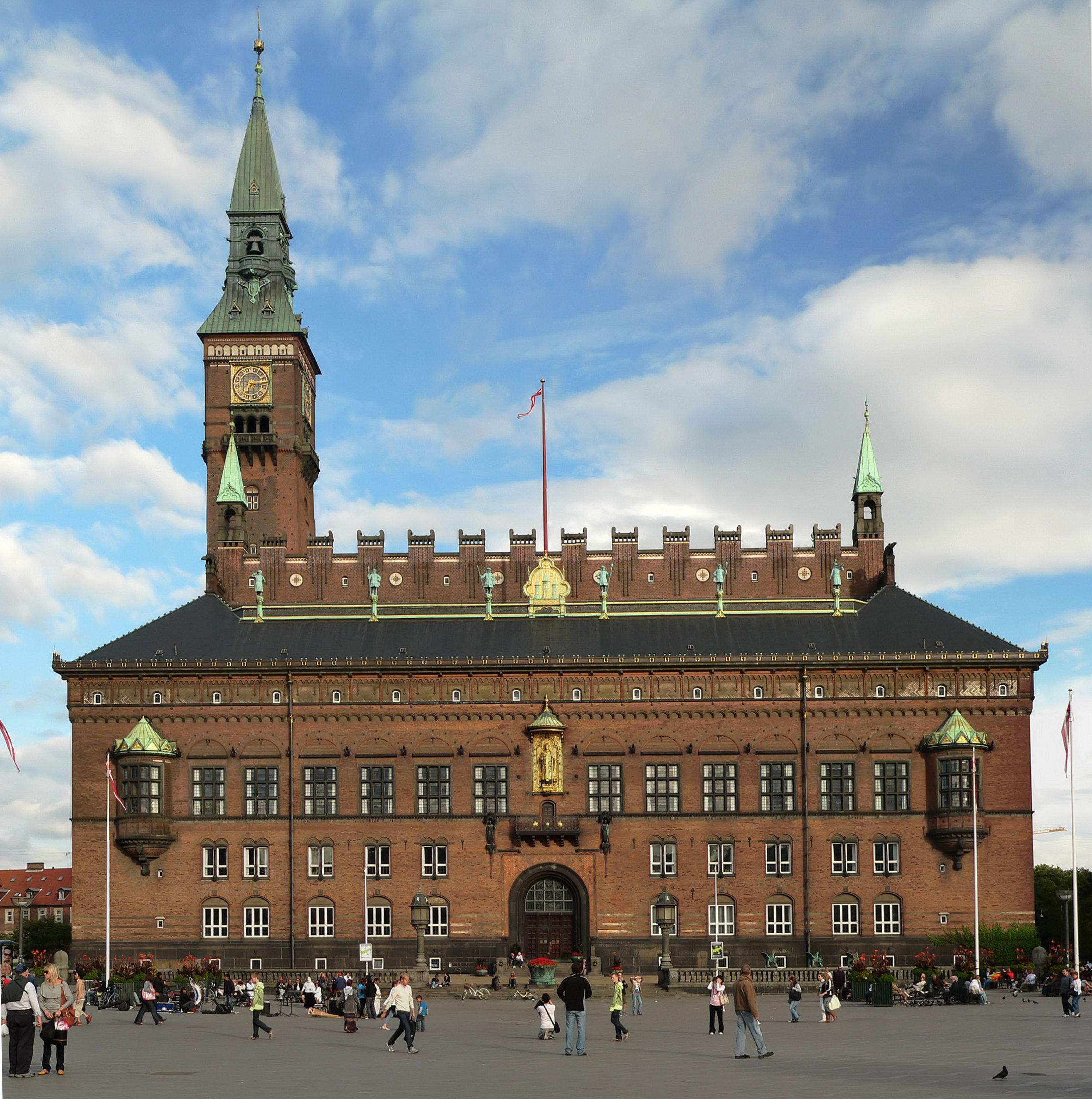
Copenhagen City Hall (1905)

- Bakkehave, Rungstedvej 41, Hørsholm (1879)
- Gasometer (now Østre Gasværk Teater, Eastern Gasworks, Copenhagen (1883, listed)
- Køge Rectory, Nyportstræde 55, Køge (1884, demolished after fire)
- Heimann House, Søndre Fasanvej 16, Frederiksberg (1884–85, extension by Hack Kampmann in 1914–1916)
- Øvelseshuset, Vallekilde Folk High School, (1884, with Andreas Bentsen, listed)
- Solbjerg Dairy, Nyelandsvej 25, Frederiksberg (1884, demolished)
- Georg Achen House, Lindevangs Allé 11, Frederiksberg (1885)
- Building for the Nordic Exhibition of 1888, Copenhagen (1886–1888, demolished)
- Rytterhuset, Nordre Strandvej 230, Ålsgårde (1889, listed)
- Barbicaia, Nordre Strandvej 232, Ålsgårde (1889, altered)
- Hvide Hus, Rungstedvej 47, Hørsholm (1889)
- Egholm House, Kastelsvej 16, Copenhagen (1890–1891, demolished)
- Regional Archive for Zealand, Lolland-Falster and Bornholm, Copenhagen (1891–1892, extended)
- Copenhagen City Hall, Copenhagen (1892–1905)
- Væverhuset, Villa Galinavej 4, Gisselfeld (1894)
- Gatehouse, Gisselfeld Castle, Zealand, Denmark (1894)
- Ottilia Rottbøll House, Ugilt Klosterskov, Sindal (1895)
- Kongshuset Rathlousdal, Odder (1898, 1900, with Pietro Krohn)
- Villa, Frisvadvej 44, Varde (1899)
- City Hall Square ("Seashell"), Copenhagen (1900, altered)
- Kathrinedal Manor, Svinninge (1900)
- Hesselhus, Hesselø (1900)
- Stenderup Frimenighedskirke (1902–1903)
- Blågård Church, Copenhagen (1904–1906, demolished)
- Lyngebæksgård, Nivå (1905–1906, currently an asylum centre)
- Elijah's Church, Vesterbro, Copenhagen (1905–1908)
- Vejle Bank, Kirkegade 2, Vejle (1905–1906, with Christof Hansen, expanded)
- Bispebjerg Hospital, Copenhagen (1906–1913, laundry building 1916–1918, later extended several times)
- Fyns Stifts Husmandsskole, Rugårdsvej, Odense (1908, bombed 17 April 1945)
- Villa, Constancevej 4, Aalborg (1910)
- Camillus Nyrop Frimenigheds rectory, Camillus Nyrop (1912)
- Fraterbrønden Well House, Sorø Akademi (1912)
- Sønderborghus, Løngang 1, Sønderborg (1912–1913)
- Arken, Xylografensvej 6, Tisvilde (1913)
- Villa, Hasserisvej 113, Aalborg (1915–1916, currently a savings bank)
- Luther Church with church building and rectory, Randersgade, Copenhagen (1914–1918, with Julius Smith)
- C. Nyrops Etablissement, Løvstræde 4A, Copenhagen (1916)
- Own house, Udsigten 33, Gentofte (1918)
- Sommer house, Villingebæk Strandvej 522B, Dronningmølle (1918)
- Farmhouses, Tranekær, Botofte, Bagenkop, bridge and chapel, Tranekær (1918–1920)
- Vejle Politi- og Dommergård, Blegbanken, Vejle (1919–1920, currently an activity center)
- Bjerrelide, Mosehøjvej 2, Ordrup (1919–1921, demolished)
- Kirkebakken 12, Gentofte (1921)

== Related reading ==
- Linvald, Steffen (1988) Den nordiske Industri-, Landbrugs- og Kunstudstilling i København 1888 : et hundredårsminde (Lynge: Bogans forlag) ISBN 8774661094
- Copenhagen City Hall
