= List of public art in Copenhagen =

This is a list of public art in Copenhagen, Denmark. This list applies only to works of public art on permanent display in an outdoor public space. For example, this does not include artworks in museums.

== City (Indre By) ==
| Image | Title / individual commemorated | Location | Sculptor | Created | Installed | Source |
|---|---|---|---|---|---|---|
| | Absalon | City Hall Square (Copenhagen City Hall); 55.675679°N 12.569422°E | Vilhelm Bissen | | 1901 | Ref |
| | Absalon | Højbro Plads; 55.677956°N 12.579979°E | Vilhelm Bissen | | 1902 | Ref |
| | Abstract sculpture (Abstrakt skulptur) | Vester Søgade / Gammel Kongevej; 55.6746°N 12.559511°E | Eva Koch | | 1987 | Ref |
| | Amaliehaven: Fountain | Larsens Plads (Amaliehaven); 55.682762°N 12.594463°E | Arnaldo Pomodoro | | 1983 | Ref |
| | Saint Ambrose | Frederiksgade (Frederick's Church); 55.684866°N 12.589991°E | Aksel Hansen | | 1887 | Ref |
| | Hans Christian Andersen | Rosenborg Castle Garden; 55.685608°N 12.581596°E | August Saabye | | 1880 | Ref |
| | Hans Christian Andersen | H. C. Andersens Boulevard; 55.675319°N 12.569113°E | Henry Luckow-Nielsen | | 1961 | Ref |
| | Ansgar | Frederiksgade (Frederick's Church); 55.684866°N 12.589991°E | Theobald Stein | | 1894 | Ref |
| | Saint Ansgar | Bredgade (St. Ansgar's Cathedral); 55.68621°N 12.591968°E | Mathilius Schack Elo | | 1927 | Ref |
| | Athanasius of Alexandria | Frederiksgade (Frederick's Church); 55.684866°N 12.589991°E | Carl Rohl-Smith | | 1887 | Ref |
| | Apollo Belvedere | Ørstedsparken; 55.681299°N 12.567002°E | Leochares (replica) | 4th century BC | 1886 | Ref |
| | Apollo Sauroctonos | Ørstedsparken; 55.680219°N 12.564454°E | Unknown | C. 350 BC | 1887 | Ref |
| | Apollon with Pegasus, Melpomene and Thalia | Kongens Nytorv (Royal Danish Theatre) 55.67968°N 12.5860122°E | Ferdinand Edvard Ring | | 1876 | Ref |
| | Arrotino | Ørstedsparken; 55.680576°N 12.566788°E | Unknown | C. 250-200 BC | 1886 | Ref |
| | Asclepius | Prins Jørgens Gård (Christiansborg Palace); 55.676468°N 12.579186°E | Bertel Thorvaldsen/Herman Wilhelm Bissen | | 1847 | Ref |
| | Augustin | Frederiksgade (Frederick's Church); 55.684866°N 12.589991°E | Johannes Gelert | | 1887 | Ref |
| | Nicolai Edinger Balle | Frederiksgade (Frederick's Church) | Jørgen Gudmundsen-Holmgreen | 1843-47 | 1949 | Ref |
| | Herman Bang | Sankt Annæ Plads; 55.681796°N 12.590583°E | Ingeborg Plockross Irminger | | 2012 | Ref |
| | Barbarian (En barbar) | Stockholmsgade (The Hirschsprung Collection); 55.690177°N 12.577648°E | Carl Johan Bonnesen | | 1913 | Ref |
| | Rudolph Bergh | Tietgensgade; 55.671891°N 12.569451°E | Peder Severin Krøyer | | 1909 | Ref |
| | Thorvald Bindesbøll | Statens Museum for Kunst | Kai Nielsen | 1910 | | |
| | Blind Boy (En blind dreng) | Kastelsvej (Institute for the Blind); 55.696049°N 12.587982°E | Peter Støhrmann Daniel | | 1857 | Ref |
| | Blind Girl (En blind pige) | Kastelsvej (Institute for the Blind); 55.696049°N 12.587982°E | Peter Støhrmann Daniel | | 1857 | Ref |
| | Benedict of Nursia | Frederiksgade (Frederick's Church); 55.684866°N 12.589991°E | Johannes Hoffmann | | 1887 | Ref |
| | Bernard of Clairvaux | Frederiksgade (Frederick's Church); 55.684866°N 12.589991°E | Georg Christian Freund | | 1887 | Ref |
| | Bissen memorial | Frederiksholms Kanal (Civiletatens Materialgård) | | | 1914 | Ref |
| | H.W. Bissen | Ny Carlsberg Glyptotek | Mathilius Schack Elo | | 1922 | Ref |
| | Niels Bohr | Frue Plads (University of Copenhagen); 55.679895°N 12.573052°E | Jørgen Gudmundsen-Holmgreen | | 1956 | Ref |
| | Boy Satyr Imbibing Wine | Ørstedsparken; 55.68155°N 12.568612°E | Louis Hasselriis | | 1778 | Ref |
| | Boy Satyr Playing the Flute | Ørstedsparken | Unknown | 4th century BC | 1887 | Source |
| | Jesper Brochmand | Frederiksgade (Frederick's Church) | Viggo Jarl | | 1933 | Ref |
| | Hans Adolph Brorson | Frederiksgade (Frederick's Church); 55.684866°N 12.589991°E | August Saabye | | 1906 | Ref |
| | Johan Nordahl Brun | Frederiksgade (Frederick's Church); 55.684866°N 12.589991°E | Jens Ferdinand Willumsen | | 1947 | Ref |
| | Sophus Bauditz | Østre Anlæg | Aksel Hansen | | 1920 | Source |
| | Asmus Jacob Carstens | Niels Brochs Gade | Theobald Stein | | 1894 | Source |
| | Caritas Well | Gammeltorv | Peter Hofmann | | i 1608 | |
| | John Chrysostom | Frederiksgade (Frederick's Church); 55.684866°N 12.589991°E | Christian Carl Peters | | 1887 | Ref |
| | H.N. Clausen | Frue Plads | Vilhelm Bissen | | 1878 | Ref |
| | Canute the Holy | Frederiksgade (Frederick's Church); 55.685116°N 12.589877°E | Viggo Jarl | | 1922 | Ref |
| | Caroline Amalie | Rosenborg Castle Garden; 55.686286°N 12.577932°E | Vilhelm Bissen | | 1896 | Ref |
| | Christian IV | Kronprinsessegade / Øster Voldgade; 55.690325°N 12.58669°E | Vilhelm Bissen | | 1900 | Ref |
| | Christian V | Kongens Nytorv; 55.680518°N 12.585944°E | | | 1688 | Ref |
| | Christian IX | Christiansborg Ridebane (Christiansborg Palace); 55.675642°N 12.578804°E | Anne Marie Carl-Nielsen | | 1927 | Ref |
| | Christian X | Sankt Annæ Plads; 55.682257°N 12.588798°E | Einar Utzon-Frank | | 1954 | Ref |
| | Countess Danner Monument | Vester Søgade / Gyldenløvesgade | Kirsten Justesen | 2024 | 2024 | |
| | The Creation of Eve (Evas skabelse) | Sølvgade (Danish National Gallery); 55.690177°N 12.577648°E | Kai Nielsen | | 1916 | Ref |
| | Cupulate Fruit | Dyrkøb; 55.679381°N 12.57352°E | Jean Arp | | 1979 | Ref |
| | Custom House relief | Toldbodgade | | | 1734 | |
| | Cyclops. The Long Journey and Figurehead (Kyklopen, Den Lange Rejse and Galionsfigur) | Asiatisk Plads; 55.675168°N 12.589045°E | Søren Georg Jensen | | | Ref |
| | Danaide | Grønningen; 55.689222°N 12.591255°E | Johannes Bjerg | | 1920 | Ref |
| | Dancers (Danserinder) | Tietgensgade (DGI-byen); 55.668842°N 12.563411°E | Keld Moseholm Jørgensen | | 2007 | Ref |
| | Dante Column | Dantes Plads; 55.673204°N 12.572994°E | | | 1924 | Ref |
| | David | Grønningen | Johannes C. Bjerg | | 1919-1923 | Ref |
| | David | Larsens Plads (Vestindisk Pakhus); 55.685979°N 12.597274°E | Michelangelo | 1503 | 1993 | Ref |
| | David | Nørregade (Church of Our Lady); 55.679333°N 12.572012°E | Jens Adolf Jerichau | 1858 | 1860 | Ref |
| | Death and the Mother (Døden og moderen) | St. Peter's Church; 55.679706°N 12.570677°E | Niels Hansen Jacobsen | 1892 | | Ref |
| | Demosthenes | Christians Brygge; 55.674262°N 12.582677°E | | | | |
| | Denmark Monument (Danmarksmonumentet) | Østre Anlæg; 55.690271°N 12.581835°E | Louis Hasselriis | | 1897 | Ref |
| | Det lider mot skymning | Østre Anlæg; 55.689294°N 12.57547°E | Aron Jerndahl | 1902 | 1904 | Ref |
| | Dragons | City Hall Square (Copenhagen City Hall) | | | | |
| | Dragon Fountain (Dragespringvandet) | City Hall Square; 55.6757°N 12.56858°E | Thorvald Bindesbøll, Joakim Skovgaard | | 1889-1923 | Ref |
| | Drunken Faun (En drukken faun) | Gyldenløvesgade; 55.681589°N 12.558135°E | Andreas Kolberg | 1857 | 1904 | Ref |
| | Paul Dubois | Ny Carlsberg Glyptotek; 55.672994°N 12.572643°E | François-Raoul Larche | | 1902 | Ref |
| | Dying Gaul (Døende galler) | Ørstedsparken; 55.682133°N 12.566289°E | Unknown | 3rd century BC | 1889 | Ref |
| | Echo (Ekko) | Rosenborg Castle Garden 55.68416°N 12.58051°E | Aksel Hansen | | 1888 | Ref |
| | Hans Egede | Frederiksgade (Frederick's Church); 55.684866°N 12.589991°E | August Saabye | | 1913 | Ref |
| | Memorial to Hans Egede and Giertrud Rask | Nikolaj Plads | August Hassel | | 1921 | Ref |
| | Egyptian Egg (Det Egyptiske Æg) | Oslo Plads (Den Frie Udstilling); 55.69114303588867°N 12.587271690368652°E | Sophia Kalkau | | 2016 | Ref |
| | Electra | Kongens Nytorv (Great Northern Building); 55.696049°N 12.587982°E | Stephan Sinding | | 1893 | Ref |
| | Saint Elijah | Frederiksgade (Frederick's Church); 55.684866°N 12.589991°E | Johannes Hoffmann | | 1887 | Ref |
| | Esaias, Moses, David, Aron, Daniel | Bredgade (St. Ansgar's Cathedral); 55.68621°N 12.591968°E | Gotthilf Borup | | 1842 | Ref |
| | Monument to Johannes Ewals and Johan Herman Wessel | Trinitatis Kirkeplads | Otto Evens | 1879 | | |
| | Farm Worker | Ny Carlsberg Glyptotek; 55.672419°N 12.572718°E | Jules Dalou | 1789 | | Ref |
| | Firefighter (Brandmand) | Bag Rådhuset (Copenhagen City Hall); 55.674622°N 12.570615°E | Anders Bundgaard | | 1900 | Ref |
| | Firefighter (Brandmand) | Bag Rådhuset (Copenhagen City Hall); 55.674622°N 12.570615°E | Anders Bundgaard | | 1900 | Ref |
| | Fishwife (Fiskerkone) | Gammel Strand; 55.677715°N 12.579512°E | Charles Svejstrup Madsen | | 1938 | Ref |
| | Indagine No. 70 | Gyldenløvesgade | Lydia Cottone | | 2000 | |
| | Frederik V on Horseback | Amalienborg Slotsplads; 55.683889°N 12.593056°E | Jacques Saly | | | |
| | Frederick VII on Horseback | Christiansborg Slotsplads; 55.676538°N 12.581277°E | Herman Wilhelm Bissen / Vilhelm Bissen | | 1873 | Ref |
| | Niels W. Gade | Østre Anlæg; 55.691487°N 12.581309°E | Vilhelm Bissen | | 1897 | Ref |
| | Gregory I | Frederiksgade (Frederick's Church); 55.684866°N 12.589991°E | Christian Carl Peters | | 1887 | Ref |
| | Peder Griffenfeld | Slotsholmen; 55.674962°N 12.580563°E | Carl Martin-Hansen | | 1922 | Ref |
| | Group of Deer (Hjortegruppe) | Rosenborg Castle Garden; 55.684°N 12.581486°E | Arthur Le Duc | 1885 | 1910 | Ref |
| | N. F. S. Grundtvig | Frederiksgade (Frederick's Church); 55.684755°N 12.589784°E | Vilhelm Bissen | | 1894 | Ref |
| | N. F. S. Grundtvig | Vartorv; 55.675429°N 12.571854°E | Niels Skovgaard | | 1932 | Ref |
| | Guapa | Tietgensgade (DGI-byen); 55.672796°N 12.571304°E | Gottfred Eickhoff | | 1953 | Ref |
| | The Hammerer | Niels Brochs Gade Ny Carlsberg Glyptotek; 55.672563°N 12.572959°E | Constantin Meunier | 1886 | 1901 | Ref |
| | Docker (French: Le Débardeur) | Tietgensgade Ny Carlsberg Glyptotek; 55.673147°N 12.571954°E | Constantin Meunier | | 1906 | Ref |
| | J. P. E. Hartmann | Sankt Annæ Plads; 55.681868°N 12.590284°E | August Saabye | | 1905 | 10+5 |
| | Hercules | Rosenborg Castle Garden | Giovanni Baratta | | ? | |
| | Hercules | Prins Jørgens Gård | Bertel Thorvaldsen | | | |
| | Hermes Resting | Ørstedsparken | | | 1886 | Source |
| | Ludvig Holberg | Kongens Nytorv | Theobald Stein | | | |
| | Valdemar Holmer | KU City Campus; 55.687596°N 12.570135°E | Theobald Stein | | 1885 | Ref |
| | Jan Hus | Frederiksgade (Frederick's Church); 55.684866°N 12.589991°E | Theobald Stein | 1884 | 1887 | |
| | Lauritz Nicolai Hvidt | Ørstedsparken; 55.680651°N 12.565076°E | Herman Wilhelm Bissen/Vilhelm Bissen | | 1877 | Ref |
| | B.S. Ingemann | Frederiksgade (Frederick's Church); 55.684866°N 12.589991°E | Knud Nellemose | | 1988 | Ref |
| | Saint Irenaeus of Lyon | Frederiksgade (Frederick's Church); 55.684866°N 12.589991°E | Carl Rohl-Smith | | 1887 | Ref |
| | Saint Jerome | Frederiksgade (Frederick's Church); 55.684866°N 12.589991°E | Otto Evens | | 1887 | Ref |
| | Joan of Arc at Domremy, listening to the heavenly voices | Ørstedsparken; 55.680931°N 12.566482°E | Henri Chapu | 1870 | 1882 | Ref |
| | John the Baptist | Frederiksgade (Frederick's Church); 55.684866°N 12.589991°E | Carl Rohl-Smith | | 1887 | Ref |
| | Niels Juel | Holmens Kanal 55.677743°N 12.586011°E | Theobald Stein | | 1881 | Ref |
| | Søren Kierkegaard | Slotsholmen; 55.674513°N 12.58096°E | Louis Hasselriis | | 1918 | Ref |
| | Søren Kierkegaard | Frederiksgade (Frederick's Church); 55.684866°N 12.589991°E | Knud Nellemose | | 1972 | Ref |
| | Thomas Kingo | Frederiksgade (Frederick's Church); 55.684866°N 12.589991°E | Viggo Jarl | | 1922 | Ref |
| | The Lion and the Horse (Løven og hesten) | Rosenborg Castle Garden; 55.683972°N 12.577425°E | Peter Husum | 1618 | c. 1643 | Ref |
| | Lion Crushing a Serpent | Dantes Plads (Ny Carlsberg Glyptotek); 55.673161°N 12.572361°E | Antoine-Louis Baryel | | 1832 | Ref |
| | Lion and Lioness | Jarmers Plads; 55.678661°N 12.56528°E | Auguste Cain | 1879 | 1889 | Ref |
| | Lions and Snake | Dantes Plads | Antoine-Louis Barye | 1832 | | Re |
| | Little Gunver (Liden Gunver) | Rosenborg Castle Garden; 55.684873°N 12.577683°E | Theobald Stein | 1899 | 1909 | Source |
| | Carl Wilder Memorial | Christian August Lorentzen Memorial (Garrison Church) | | | | |
| | Hans Christian Lumbye | Tivoli Gardens | Svend Rathsack | | 1930 | |
| | J.T. Lundbye Memorial | Sankt Annæ Plads (Garrison Church); 55.68183°N 12.589429°E | Herman Wilhelm Bissen | | 1857 | Ref |
| | Lur Blowers | Regnbuepladsen; 55.67603°N 12.57016°E | Siegfried Wagner | | 1914 | |
| | Martin Luther | Frederiksgade (Frederick's Church); 55.684792°N 12.589833°E | Theobald Stein | | 1887 | Ref |
| | Johan Nicolai Madvig | Frue Plads | Vilhelm Bissen | | 1887 | Ref |
| | Mælk gir sundhed | Sølvgade (Sølvgade School); 55.6864°N 12.583047°E | Henry Heerup | | 1955 | Ref |
| | Marble balls | Rosenborg Castle Garden | Unknown | | 17th century | |
| | Neapolitan Fisherman Teaches His Son to Play the Flute | Store Strandstræde; 55.681329°N 12.589999°E | Otto Evens | | 1859 | Ref |
| | Hans Lassen Martensen | Frue Plads (University of Copenhagen); 55.679491°N 12.572269°E | Theobald Stein | 1876 | 1888 | Ref |
| | Magpie Well | Pistolstræde | Gunnar Westman | | 1980 | |
| | Maternal Love | Ny Carlsberg Glyptotek; 55.671805°N 12.571782°E | Constantin Meunier | 1893 | 1906 | Ref |
| | Maternal Love; Moderkærlighed | Vester Voldgade/Stormgade; 55.67442°N 12.572581°E | Otto Evens | | 1939 | Ref |
| | Memorial Anchor | Nyhavn | | | 1951 | |
| | Mercury | Slotsholmsgade (Børsen); 55.67573°N 12.582538°E | Johann Christoph Petzold | | 1745 | Ref |
| | Mercury | Nordre Toldbod) | Carl Christian Peters | | Ref | |
| | Mercury | Købmagergade (Børsen); 55.680783°N 12.577763°E | Julius Schultz | | 1896 | Ref |
| | Mermaid; Havfrue | Christians Brygge; 55.672987°N 12.58228°E | Anne Marie Carl-Nielsen | 1921 | 2009 | Ref |
| | Minerva | Prins Jørgens Gård | Bertel Thorvaldsen/H. W. Bissen | | 1847 | Ref |
| | Mirror and Densification; Spejl og fortætning | Otto Mønsteds Plads; 55.670798°N 12.574072°E | Hein Heinsen | | 1996 | Ref |
| | Mirror Basin | Bertel Thorvaldsens Plads; 55.676139°N 12.577168°E | Jørn Larsen | | 2002 | Ref |
| | Modern Girl; Moderne pige | Ny Carlsberg Glyptotek; 55.672291°N 12.571101°E | Gerhard Henning | | 1933 | Ref |
| | A Moment of Peril | Rosenborg Castle Garden; 55.683821°N 12.578254°E | Thomas Brock | 1880 | 1881 | Ref |
| | Moses | Nørregade; 55.679157°N 12.572152°E | Herman Wilhelm Bissen | | 1859 | Ref |
| | Moses | Frederiksgade (Frederick's Church); 55.684866°N 12.589991°E | Carl Rohl-Smith | | 1887 | |
| | Jacob Peter Mynster | Frue Plads (University of Copenhagen); 55.679522°N 12.572415°E | Theobald Stein | 1874 | 1875 | Ref |
| | Jacob Peter Mynster | Frederiksgade (Frederick's Church) | Johannes Bjerg | 1941 | | Ref |
| | Nemesis | Prins Jørgens Gård; 55.676523°N 12.579344°E | Bertel Thorvaldsen/H. W. Nielsen | | 1847 | Ref |
| | Neptune | Børsen; 55.675963°N 12.58269°E | Johann Christoph Petzold | | 1745 | Ref |
| | Neptune | Nordre Toldbod; 55.689075°N 12.598743°E | Christian Carl Peters | | 1870 | Ref |
| | Carl Nielsen Monument | Grønningen/Store Kongensgade; 55.690833°N 12.588658°E | Anne Marie Carl-Nielsen | | 1939 | Ref |
| | The Nile (Nilen) | Søtorvet | | 1st century | 1896 | Ref |
| | Adam Oehlenschläger | Kongens Nytorv (Royal Danish Theatre); 55.679733°N 12.586146°E | Herman Wilhelm Bissen | | 1861 | Ref |
| | One Of The Many (En af de mange) | Sankt Annæ Plads (Garrison Church); 55.681965°N 12.589049°E | Carl Johan Bonnesen | | 1915 | Ref |
| | Anders Sandøe Ørsted | Ørstedsparken; 55.682297°N 12.565999°E | Vilhelm Bissen | 1902 | | Ref |
| | Hans Christian Ørsted | Ørstedsparken 55.68079°N 12.567378°E | Jens Adolf Jerichau | | 1876 | Ref |
| | Peder Palladius | Frederiksgade (Frederick's Church) | Viggo Jarl | | 1921 | Ref |
| | Paul the Apostle | Frederiksgade (Frederick's Church); 55.684866°N 12.589991°E | Christian Carl Peters | | 1887 | |
| | Pearl Anglais | Grønlandske Handels Plads | Eva Sørensen | | 2003 | |
| | Saint Peter | Frederiksgade (Frederick's Church); 55.684866°N 12.589991°E | August Saabye | | 1887 | Ref |
| | Peter and the Cock | St. Peter's Church; 55.67985153198242°N 12.569851875305176°E | Henrik Starcke | | 1966 | Ref |
| | Polar bears | Copenhagen City Hall 55.675806°N 12.569808°E | Anders Bundgaard | | 1897 | Ref |
| | Polycarp | Frederiksgade (Frederick's Church); 55.684866°N 12.589991°E | Ferdinand Edvard Ring | | 1894 | |
| | The Private Soldier and the Little Hornblower; Landsoldaten med den lille hornblæser | H. C. Andersens Boulevard 55.676653°N 12.567241°E | Hans Peder Pedersen-Dan | | 1899 | Ref |
| | Quadriga | Thorvaldsens Museum 55.67658°N 12.577924°E | Herman Wilhelm Bissen | | 1848 | Ref |
| | Reformation Monument | Bispetorv 55.679191°N 12.571755°E | Max Andersen and Harald Lønborg-Jensen | | 1941 | Ref |
| | Resting Satyr | Ørstedsparken 55.680751°N 12.566423°E | Unknown | C. 350 BC | 1887 | Ref |
| | The Return of the Prodigal Son | Dag Hammerskjölds Allé (House of Unitarians); 55.695444°N 12.5815°E | Axel Poulsen | | 1926 | Ref |
| | Olfert Ricard Memorial | Sankt Annæ Plads (Garrison Church); 55.68197°N 12.589004°E | Axel Poulsen | | 1930 | Ref |
| | Franklin F. Roosevelt | Sankt Annæ Plads | Jo Davidson | 1933 | | Ref |
| | Ring riding columns | Unknown | | 16th-17th century | Source | |
| | Toldboden | Larsens Plads | Søren Georg Jensen | | 1979 | Ref |
| | Satyr with Crotales | Ørstedsparken 55.679883°N 12.564969°E | Unknown | C. 300 BC | 1886 | Ref |
| | Satyr with the Infant Bacchus (Silen med bacchusbarn) | Ørstedsparken 55.68128°N 12.567571°E | Unknown | 4th century BC | 1880 | Ref |
| | Satyr With Wine Sack; Satyr med vinsæk | Rigshospitalet 55.696756°N 12.568638°E | Max Andersen | | 1923 | Ref |
| | Sophus Schandorph | Østre Anlæg 55.692034°N 12.584361°E | Peder Severin Krøyer | | 1904 | Ref |
| | Joakim Frederik Schouw | Frue Plads 55.679793°N 12.572605°E | Herman Wilhelm Bissen | | 1857 | Ref |
| | Seated Woman | Langebrogade 55.670287°N 12.587331°E | Henry Luckow-Nielsen | | 1943 | Ref |
| | The Seamark (Sømærket) | Applebys Plads 55.670979°N 12.584632°E | Freddy Fraek | | 1996 | Ref |
| | Setting for a Well | Langebrogade | Anders Bundgaard | | 1899 | Ref |
| | Silenus with the Infant Bacchus | Ørstedsparken 55.68128°N 12.567571°E | Lysippos | 4th century BC | 1880 | Ref |
| | Lauritz Smith Memorial | Cemetery of Holmen | | 1794 | | |
| | The Sower; Sædemand | Tietgensgade Ny Carlsberg Glyptotek 55.67295°N 12.571632°E | Constantin Meunier | | 1901 | Ref |
| | Japetus Steenstrup | Frue Plads 55.679873°N 12.57295°E | Vilhelm Bissen | | 1898 | Ref |
| | Standing Woman | Ny Carlsberg Glyptotek 55.672059°N 12.571562°E | Svend Rathsack | | 1941 | Ref |
| | Thorvald Stauning Memorial | Staunings Plads; 55.67808°N 12.562941°E | August Keil | 1964 | Ref | |
| | Den slanke bærer løfter den tunge | H. C. Andersens Boulevard | Jørgen Haugen Sørensen | | 1896 | |
| | Stork Fountain; Storkespringvandet | Amagertorv 55.6788°N 12.5796°E | Edvard Petersen/Vilhelm Bissen | | 1894 | Ref |
| | Edouard Suenson Memorial | Store Kongensgade 55.68845°N 12.58951°E | Theobald Stein | | 1889 | |
| | Svitzer Memorial | Nyhavn | | | | |
| | Svend Aage Tauscher | Nikolai Plads 55.678617°N 12.582002°E | Troels Lybecker | 1987 | Ref | |
| | Hans Tausen | Frederiksgade (Frederick's Church); 55.684866°N 12.589991°E | Viggo Jarl | | 1929 | Ref |
| | The Thinker | Ny Carlsberg Glyptotek 55.672084°N 12.571243°E | Auguste Rodin | | Ref | |
| | Three Shapes (Tre former) | Nikolaj Plads; 55.67851°N 12.58184°E | Bent Sørensen | | 1992 | Ref |
| | Julius Thomsen | Sølvgade 55.688619°N 12.574204°E | August Saabyel | | 1880 | Ref |
| | Vilhelm Thomsen | Frue Plads 55.679673°N 12.572058°E | Ludvig Brandstrup | | 1921 | Ref |
| | Bertel Thorvaldsen | Ørstedsparken 55.680149°N 12.565076°E | Einar Utzon-Frank | | 1954 | Ref |
| | C. F. Tietgen | Sankt Annæ Plads 55.681284°N 12.592443°E | Rasmus Andersen | | 1905 | Ref |
| | Tordenskjold | Church of Holmen | Herman Wilhelm Bissen | | | |
| | Troll that smells Christian blood Trold, der vejrer kristenblod | Ny Carlsberg Glyptotek 55.672339°N 12.570706°E | Niels Hansen Jacobsen | | 1896 | Ref |
| | Tubalcain | Sølvgade | Vilhelm Bissen | | 1881 | Ref |
| | Two Resting Lions; To Hvilende Løver | Rosenborg Castle Garden 55.68536°N 12.578219°E | Jacob Høvinghoff | | 1745 | Ref |
| | Tycho Brahe | Øster Voldgade (Østervold Observatory) | Herman Wilhelm Bissen | | 1866 | |
| | Tycho Brahe | Købmagergade (Round Tower) 55.68132°N 12.575891°E | Siegfried Wagner | | 1932 | Ref |
| | Two Sisters; To søstre | Eidsvoll Plads 55.691045°N 12.5881°E | Ørnulf Bast | | 1949 | Ref |
| | H.V.S. Gredsted | UCPH City Campus 55.688312°N 12.57117°E | Helen Dohlmann | | 1912 | Ref |
| | Walross | Copenhagen City Hall 55.674858°N 12.571025°E | Anders Bundgaard | | 1899 | Ref |
| | Watchmen | Copenhagen City Hall | Anders Bundgaard | | | |
| | C.E.F. Weyse | Frue Plads 55.679601°N 12.572792°E | Herman Wilhelm Bissen | | 1866 | Ref |
| | Wrestlers | Ørstedsparken 55.679499°N 12.565763°E | Unknown | 3rd century BC | 1887 | Ref |
| | John Wyclif | Frederiksgade (Frederick's Church); 55.684866°N 12.589991°E | Theobald Stein | 1783 | 1894 | Ref |
| | Natalie Zahle | Ørstedsparken 55.68122°N 12.566353°E | Ludvig Brandstrup | | 1915 | |
| | Zero Reference Point Amagerport | Torvegade | Peder Vilhelm Jensen-Klint | | 1920 | Ref |
| | Zero Reference Point Østerport | Oslo Plads | Peder Vilhelm Jensen-Klint | | 1925 | Ref |
| | Zero Reference Point Vesterport | City Hall Square | Peder Vilhelm Jensen-Klint | | 1925 | Ref |
| | Zinkglobal - nøglen til fremtiden | Nordre Toldbod 55.689421°N 12.599629°E | Kim Michael | | 2012 | Ref |
| | Zodiac | Axeltorv 55.675117°N 12.56504°E | Mogens Møller | | 1991 | Ref |
| | Georg Zoëga | Tietgensgade (Ny Carlsberg Glyptotek) 55.673023°N 12.57175°E | Ludvig Brandstrup | | | Ref |
| | Water feature | Gråbrødretorv 55.679746°N 12.575824°E | Søren Georg Jensen | | 1971 | Ref |
| | Water feature | Købmagergade | Anders Tinsbo | | 1970 | Ref |

== Frederiksberg ==
| Image | Title / individual commemorated | Location | Sculptor | Created | Installed | Source |
|---|---|---|---|---|---|---|
| | Peter Christian Abildgaard | UCPH Frederiksberg Campus | August Hassel | | 1910 | Ref |
| | Amor og Psyke | Falkoner Allé 55.681314°N 12.534515°E | Pontus Kjerrman | | 2004 | Ref |
| | Ancient Hunter (Urjægeren) | Dalgas Boulevard 55.673144°N 12.50654°E | Aksel Hansen | | 1926 | Ref |
| | Bernhard Bang | UCPH Frederiksberg Campus 55.67982°N 12.540384°E | August Hassel | | 1923 | Ref |
| | Bridge (Bro) | Gammel Kongevej (Codanhus); 55.673822°N 12.554656°E | Preben Boye | | 2005 | Ref |
| | Georg Carstensen | Georg Carstensens Plads | C. C. Peters | 1868 | 2019 | |
| | Carina | Ved Andebakken 55.679429°N 12.528333°E | Anker Hoffmann | | 1941 | Ref |
| | Dance | Borgmester Godskesens plads | Johannes Bjerg | | 1918 | |
| | Holger Drachmann | Digterlunden 55.676883°N 12.532525°E | Hans Christian Holter | | 1924 | Ref |
| | Dyr i vænge | Rolighedsvej (UCPH Frederiksberg Campus); 55.684087°N 12.545657°E | Mogens Bøggild | | 1938 | Ref |
| | Niels Fjord | Rolighedsvej (Frederiksberg Campus); 55.684029°N 12.545115°E | Aksel Hansen | | 1892 | Ref |
| | Footballers | Peter Bangs Vej (K.B. Hallen) 55.678162°N 12.494765°E | Knud Nellemosel | | 1976 | Ref |
| | Frederick VI | Frederiksberg Park | Herman Wilhelm Bissen | 1857 | | |
| | Meïr Aron Goldschmidt | Digterlunden; 55.676393°N 12.53252°E | Aksel Hansen | 1887 | 1920 | Ref |
| | Carl Christian Hall | Søndermarken; 55.66831°N 12.529961°E | Vilhelm Bissen | | 1890 | Ref |
| | Hercules (Hercules som slangedræber) | Frederiksberg Courthouse 55.680164°N 12.528822°E | Max Andersen | | 1930 | Ref |
| | Holger Fanske Monument | Julius Thomsens Plads | Joakim Zacho Weylandt | 2026 | 2026 | |
| | Jeanne D'Arc School Bombing Memorial | Frederiksberg Allé 55.674566°N 12.536393°E | Max Andersen | | 1945 | Ref |
| | Carl Oluf Jensen | UCPH Frederiksberg Campus; 55.67982°N 12.540384°E | Oscar Vitalis Gustavson | | 1935 | Ref |
| | Hans Vilhelm Kaalund | Digterlunden; 55.677188°N 12.532616°E | Aksel Hansen | 1918 | 1919 | Ref |
| | Kuglestøder | Sønderjyllands Allé (Frederiksberg Idrætspark) 55.68088°N 12.49712°E | Jenö Meister | | 1938 | Ref |
| | Last Scene; Sidste scene | Kjeld Petersens Plads | Eva Steen Christensen | 2911 | | |
| | Maria Feodorovna | Kejserinde Dagmars Plads | Sergey Boguslavskij | | 2013 | Ref |
| | The Meeting; Mødet | Rosenørns Allé (Energiens Torv) | Joachim Bang | | 2003 | |
| | Mercury | Rosenørns Allé; 55.681498°N 12.554278°E | Povl Søndergaard | | 1939 | Ref |
| | Memorial Wells: Dutch Girl | Sankt Thomas Plads 55.673433°N 12.547001°E | Jenö Meister | | 1932 | Ref |
| | Memorial Wells: Falconer | Sankt Thomas Plads 55.673123°N 12.546899°E | Jenö Meister | | 1932 | Ref |
| | Adam Wilhelm Mørkeberg | UCPH Frederiksberg Campus; 55.67982°N 12.540384°E | Jørgen Windfeld-Schmidt | | | Ref |
| | Henri Nathansen | Allégade (Digterlunden) 55.676669°N 12.532426°E | Gottfred Eickhoff | | 1953 | Ref |
| | Adam Gottlob Oehlenschlager | Søndermarken 55.670857°N 12.52583°E | Julius Schultz | | 1897 | Ref |
| | Carl Ploug | Danas Plads 55.696049°N 12.587982°E | Vilhelm Bissen | | 1972 | Ref |
| | Radiofonifiguren | Rosenørns Allé (Radiohuset) 55.682177°N 12.552288°E | Mogens Bøgild | | 1950 | Ref |
| | Knud Lyne and Kamma Rahbek Memorial | Rahbeks Allé (Bakkehuset) | Hermann Ernst Freund | | c. 1833 | |
| | Reaper (En høstkarl) | Søndre Fasanvej (Porcelænshaven) | Georg Jensen | | 1915 | Ref |
| | Emil Rostrup | UCPH Frederiksberg Campus; 55.680356°N 12.542613°E | Rasmus Andersen | | 1909 | Ref |
| | Hippocampus (Havhest) | Rådmand Steins Allé 55.673664°N 12.501347°E | Hans Olsen | | 1960 | Ref |
| | Stående halvt draperet kvinde | Pile Allé (Royal Danish Horticultural Society's Garden) | Henrik Starcke | | 1956 | Ref |
| | H.V. Stockfleth | UCPH Frederiksberg Campus; 55.67982°N 12.540384°E | Rasmus Andersen | | 1900 | Ref |
| | Sunshine Girls (Solpiger) | Falkoner Plads (Frederiksberg Library) 55.680883°N 12.530449°E | Gottfred Eickhoff | | 1972 | Ref |
| | Two Young People (To unge mennesker) | Frederiksberg Rådhusplads 55.67808°N 12.532852°E | Anker Hoffmann | | 1960 | Ref |
| | Edward Tesdorpf | Tesdorpfsvej; 55.68654°N 12.515075°E | Theobald Stein | | 1898 | Ref |
| | Thinking Horse; Tænkende hest | UCPH Frederiksberg Campus 55.678903°N 12.54224°E | Pontus Kjerrman | | 1998 | Ref |
| | Woman With Mirror (Kvinde med spejl) | Femte Juni Plads; 55.686673°N 12.514358°E | Gunnar Hammerich | | 1938 | Ref |
| | Kristian Zahrtmann | Kristian Zahrtmanns Plads | Hans Syberg | | 1931 | Ref |

== Nørrebro ==
| Image | Title / individual commemorated | Location | Sculptor | Created | Installed | Source |
|---|---|---|---|---|---|---|
| | Aphrodite | De Gamles By; 55.696211°N 12.560691°E | Einar Utzon-Frank | | 1937 | Ref |
| | Arthemis Fountain (Artemisspringvandet) | Hans Tavsens Park | Johannes Bjerg | | 1936 | Ref |
| | Awakening Girl (Vågnende pige) | Stevnsgade | Einar Utzon-Frank | | 1936 | Ref |
| | Dancing Girls (Dansende piger) | Guldbergs Have; 55.696211°N 12.560691°E | Frantz Viggo Hansen | | 1939 | Ref |
| | Before and After the Moment (Før og efter øjeblikket) | Sortedam Dossering | Hein Heinsen | | 1938 | Ref |
| | Bulsetrold | De Gamles By | Ingeborg Irminger | | 1944 | Ref |
| | A.D. Jørgensen | Jagtvej (Landsarkivet); 55.696211°N 12.560691°E | Vilhelm Bissen | | 1901 | Ref |
| | A. W. Holm | Meinungsgade (Smedemesterforeningens Stiftelse) | | | 1883 | |
| | Laocoön | Hans Tavsens Park | Agesander, Athenodoros, and Polydorus, | 25 B.C. | 1925 | |
| | Hans Wilhelm Meyer Memorial | Amorparken | | 1888 | | |
| | Moses | Hans Tavsens Park | Michelangelo | c. 1515 | 1925 | |
| | The Mother (Moderen) | Amorparken | Carl Johan Bonnesen | 1930 | 1831 | |
| | Reclining Figure | Sortedam Dossering | Søren Georg Jensen | | 1981 | Ref |
| | Sculptures | Blågårds Plads | Kai Nielen | | | |
| | Sculpture in Honour of Salvador Allende | Red Square | Claudio Cortes | | 2003 | Ref |
| | Seated Young People; Siddende unge mennesker | Dronning Louises Bro | Johannes Hansen | | 1940 | Ref |
| | Studying Girl (Granskende Pige) | Møllegade (Literaturhaus) | Anders Bundgaard | | 2008 | Ref |
| | The Angular Ones support, and the Smooth Ones Slip | Nørrebrogade | Jørgen Haugen Sørensen | | 1984 | Ref |
| | The House that Rains | Sankt Hans Torv | Jørgen Haugen Sørensen | | 1993 | Ref |
| | Treasure of Gold | Sjællandsgade | Ejgil Westergaard | | 1990 | |
| | Herman Trier | Herman Triers Plads 55.682596°N 12.554739°E | Johannes Bjerg | | 1936 | Ref |
| | Untitled | Nørre Allé (Panum Institute); 55.695496°N 12.561595°E | Claus Carstensen | | 2005 | Ref |

== Østerbro ==
| Image | Title / individual commemorated | Location | Sculptor | Created | Installed | Source |
|---|---|---|---|---|---|---|
| | After the Swim (Efter badet) | Langelinie; 55.693189°N 12.599328°E | Carl Aarsleff | | 1909 | Ref |
| | The Archer | Gunnar Nu Hansens Plads (Østerbro Stadium); 55.704098°N 12.576562°E | Ernst Moritz Geyger | | 1911 | Ref |
| | At the Post; Ved målet | Gunnar Nu Hansens Plads (ØsterbroStadium) | Alfred Boucher | | 1930 | Ref |
| | Aura | Strandvejen; 55.720028°N 12.576771°E | Kristian Dahlgård Larsen | | 1992 | Ref |
| | Authumn; Efterår | Poul Henningsens Plads | Jens Lund | | 1935 | Ref |
| | Kaj Birksted | Churchillparken; 55.688362°N 12.596549°E | Gudrun Steen-Andersen | | 2009 | Ref |
| | Bird with Young (Fugl med unge) | Kildevældsparken; 55.715016°N 12.566439°E | Sonja Ferlov Mancoba | | 1886 | Ref |
| | C.E. Bloch | Blegdamsvej (Rigshospitalet); 55.69672°N 12.568477°E | Jens Ferdinand Willumsen | | 1922 | Ref |
| | Thomas Dinesen | Churchillparken | Sergej Boguslavskij | | 2017 | Ref |
| | F.J. Borgbjerg Memorial | Fælledparken/Borgmester Jensens Allé; 55.702845°N 12.564336°E | Svend Lindhart | | 1939 | Ref |
| | Boundary Post | Strandvejen/Tuborgvej; 55.727007°N 12.575682°E | Jens Lund | | 1926 | Ref |
| | Damoxenos, the Fist-Fighter | Gunnar Nu Hansens Plads (Østerbro Stadium); 55.704506°N 12.574123°E | Antonio Canova | | 1911 | Ref |
| | Danish Mormon emigrant memorial | Amerikakaj | Dennis Smith | | 2000 | Ref |
| | Creature Pushing a Box (Væsen der skubber kasse) | Sortedam Dossering; 55.696991°N 12.578938°E | Egon Fischer | | 1981 | Ref |
| | Diana on Horseback; Diana til hest) | Trondheim Pads; 55.694187°N 12.58846°E | Carl Johan Bonnesen | | 1912 | Ref |
| | Effort Commun | Sortedam Lake | Sonja Ferlov Mancoba | | 1982 | |
| | Footballer (En fodbldspiller) | Fælledparken; 55.705281°N 12.57014°E | Jean Gauguin | | 1938 | Ref |
| | Frederik IX | Langelinie | Knud Nellemose | | 1981 | |
| | Gefion Fountain | Langelinie; 55.689444°N 12.5975°E | Anders Bundgaard | | 1908 | Ref |
| | The Genetically Modified Paradise (Det genmodificerede paradis) | Langelinie; 55.698279°N 12.599165°E | Bjørn Nørgaard | | 2006 | Ref |
| | Granite ball | Fælledparken; 55.69981°N 12.572699°E | Erik Rytter | | 1913 | Ref |
| | Gunnar Nu Hansen | Gunnar Nu Hansens Plads; 55.704788°N 12.576905°E | Salvatore Perotta | | 1996 | Ref |
| | Memorial to F.F. Ulrik and Moses Melchior | Kildevældsgade; 55.71452°N 12.574625°E | Ludvig Brandstrup | | 1916 | Ref |
| | Monument to Danish Spanish Civil War volunteers | Churchillparken; 55.687993°N 12.595088°E | Per Ulrich | | 1986 | Ref |
| | Mindesmærke for finnebørns plejeforældre i Danmark 1940-1947 | Churchillparken; 55.687897°N 12.59446°E | Gerda Qvist | | 2004 | Ref |
| | Hans Knudsen | Hans Knudsens Plads; 55.712779°N 12.560774°E | Edvard Harald Bentzen | 1896 | 2003 | Ref |
| | Holger Hammerich memorial | Langelinie | Anders J. Bundgaard and Heinrich Wenck | | 11918 | Ref |
| | Horizontal Figure (Liggende figur) | Sortedam Dossering (Frederick's Church); 55.690976°N 12.567769°E | Søren Georg Jensen | | 1982 | Ref |
| | Ivar Huitfeldt Column | Langelinie 55.690619°N 12.599151°E | Vilhelm Dahlerup | | 1886 | Ref |
| | Jeanne d'Arc | Institut Sankt Joseph | Marie d'Orléans | | | |
| | Kreugas, the Fist-Fighter | Gunnar Nu Hansens Plads (Østerbro Stadium); 55.704541°N 12.575599°E | Antonio Canova | | 1911 | Ref |
| | The Little Mermaid | Langelinie 55.692857°N 12.599275°E | Edvard Eriksen | | 1913 | Ref |
| | Anders Lassen | Churchillparken | Svend Lindhart | | 1987 | Ref |
| | Martin Luther | Randersgade (Luther Church) 55.702539°N 12.581422°E | Rikard Magnussen | | 1983 | Ref |
| | Man and Woman | Gunnar Nu Hansens Plads (Ørbo Hallen); 55.704498°N 12.576959°E | Axel Poulsen | | 1931 | Ref |
| | H.C.V. Møller Memorial | Fælledparken | Harald Quistgaard | | 1949 | Ref |
| | Memorial to Danish Communist Resistance Fighters | Churchillparken/Esplanaden; 55.688044°N 12.595536°E | Knud Nellemose | | 1996 | Ref |
| | Memorial to Nordic Volunteers and Fallen | Smedelinien/Kastellet; 55.691399°N 12.589557°E | Anders Bundgaard | | 1920 | Ref |
| | Memorial to Danish World War II Resistance Fighters | Pile Alle (Royal Danish Horticultural Society's Garden); 55.673281°N 12.531239°E | Henrik Starcke | | | Ref |
| | Denmark Expedition Memorial | Langelinie; 55.694862°N 12.600232°E | Kai Nielsen | | 1912 | Ref |
| | Ejnar Mikkelsen | Langelinie 55.695281°N 12.599806°E | Adam Fischer | | 1974 | Ref |
| | Venetian Fisher Boy with Pitcher | Grønningen (Kastellet) 55.688678°N 12.591915°E | Theobald Stein | 1860 | 1901 | Ref |
| | Pond | Melchiors Plads | Lis Mogensen | | 1904 | Ref |
| | Polar Bear With Cubs (Isbjørn med unger) | Langelinie; 55.695547°N 12.600465°E | Holger Wederkinch | | 1929 | Ref |
| | Princess Marie Memorial | Langelinie; 55.690147°N 12.598765°E | Carl Martin-Hansen | | 1912 | Ref |
| | Red Steel Sculpture; Rød stålskulptur | Strandvejen (Norges Minde) | Margot Zanstra | | 1988 | |
| | Recumbent Girl (Liggende pige) | Grønningen (Kastelsparken) | Gerhard Henning | | 1945 | Ref |
| | Reunion Monument | Trianglen | Axel Poulsen og Holger Jacobsen | | 1929 | |
| | Reunification plaque | Prinsesse Charlottes Gade (Guldberg School) | | | 1920 | |
| | Sculpture | Sortedam Dossering 55.689712°N 12.565854°E | Gert Nielsen | | 1982 | Ref |
| | Sculpture in Three Parts | Fælledparken | Peter Bonnén | | 1971 | Ref |
| | Sigurd Fafnersbane og slange | Langelinie; 55.697799°N 12.569432°E | Henrik Andersen | | 1993 | Ref |
| | Skraberen | Gunnar Nu Hansens Plads (Østerbro Stadium) 55.704518°N 12.574853°E | Peter Støhrmann Daniel | | 1911 | Ref |
| | Snow Melting (Sneen smelter) | Emdrup Søpark; 55.72213°N 12.545974°E | Anders Bundgaard | | 1941 | Ref |
| | Søfartsmonumentet | Langelinie | Svend Rathsack | | | |
| | Standing Woman (Stående kvinde) | Strandvænget 55.716653°N 12.58169°E | Henry Luckow-Nielsen | | 1958 | Ref |
| | The Swimmer (Svømmeren) | Langelinie; 55.693591°N 12.59995°E | John Börjeson | 1885 | 1909 | Ref |
| | Spydbæreren | Gunnar Nu Hansens Plads (Østerbro Stadium); 55.704528°N 12.574942°E | Unknown | | 1911 | Ref |
| | Temperance Monument; Adholdsmonumentet | Fælledparken; 55.701581°N 12.564331°E | Rikard Magnussen | | 1914 | Ref |
| | Towards the Light (Mod lyset) | Blegdamsvej; 55.694019°N 12.566235°E | Rudolph Tegner | | 1909 | Ref |
| | Two Lions; To løver | Den Franske Plads 55.704978°N 12.574667°E | Lauritz Jensen | 1905 | 1906 | Ref |
| | Two Sports Scenes; To sportsscenr | Østerbrogade (Stadium) 55.704105°N 12.577211°E | Axel Poulsen | | 1926 | Ref |
| | Uffe med sværdet Skræp | Gunnar Nu Hansens Plads (Østerbro Stadium); 55.70451°N 12.574019°E | Aksel Hansen | | 1911 | Ref |
| | Valkyrie | Churchillparken; 55.687858°N 12.594033°E | Stephan Sinding | 1908 | 1910 | Ref |
| | Victor Borge | Victor Borges Plads; 55.701553°N 12.580813°E | Hanne Varming | | 2009 | Ref |
| | Winston Churchill | Churchillparken; 55.68871°N 12.596498°E | Oscar Nemon | | 1955 | Ref |
| | Wounded Woman (Såret kvinde) | Churchillparken; 55.688293°N 12.595675°E | Bernard Reder | | 1969 | Ref |

== Vesterbro/Kongens Enghave ==
| Image | Title / individual commemorated | Location | Sculptor | Created | Installed | Source |
|---|---|---|---|---|---|---|
| | A Fallen Soldier; En falden soldat | Vestre Cemetery | Arne Bang | | 1928 | Ref |
| | Anchor | Sydhavns Plads | | | 1975 | |
| | Boy With Fiasco (Drengebarn med fiasco) | Enghave Plads; 55.690177°N 12.577648°E | Jens Lund | | 1926 | Ref |
| | Bull | Kødbyen | Einar Utzon-Frank | | 1933 | Ref |
| | Elephants | Carlsberg | Hans Peder Pedersen-Dan | | 1901 | |
| | Hercules Fountain | Vesterbros Torv | Rasmus Harboe | | 1915 | Ref |
| | The Horse Tamer; Le dompteur de chevaux | Bavnehøj Allé | Thomas Vinçotte | 1885 | | |
| | Emil Christian Hansen | Carlsberg (Hotel Ottilia) | Nicolai Outzen Schmidt/Vilhelm Dahlerup | 1900 | 1900 | |
| | Carl Jacobsen | Carlsberg | Ludvig Brandstrup | | 1921 | Ref |
| | Carl Jacobsen | Carlsberg (Hotel Ottilia) | Vilhelm Dahlerup | 1895 | 1895 | |
| | Jacob Christian Jacobsen | Carlsberg (Carlsberg Laboratory) | Vilhelm Bissen | | | |
| | Jacob Christian Jacobsen | Ny Carlsbergvej | Trine Dreyer | | 1956 | Ref |
| | Jacob Christian Jacobsen | Carlsberg (Carlsberg Laboratory) | Vilhelm Bissen | | | |
| | Ottilia Jacobsen | Carlsberg (Hotel Ottilia) | | | | |
| | Carl and Ottilia Jacobsen | Carlsberg (Elephant Tower) | Ludvig Brandstrup | | 1906 | Ref |
| | Man from Mols | Copenhagen Central Station | | | | |
| | Music; Musikken | Mozarts Plads | Carl Johan Bonnesen | | | Ref |
| | Louis Pasteur | Ny Carlsbergvej | Paul Dubois | | 1884 | Ref |
| | The Point; Punktet | Wagnersvej (Karens Minde) | Eva Koch | | 1993 | |
| | Gabriel Sedlmayr | Carlsberg (Hotel Ottilia) | Alexis Møller | 1900 | 1900 | |
| | Venus with the Apple; Venus med æblet | Enghaveparken | Kai Nielen | | 1918-20 | Ref |
| | Thor sculpture | Ny Carlsberg Brewhouse | Carl Johan Bonnesen | | | |
| | Young People; Unge mennesker | Rektorparken | Tove Ólafsson | | 1954 | |
| | Youth; Ungdom | Enghaveparken 55.666609°N 12.541843°E | Einar Utzon-Frank | | 1952 | Ref |
| | Unknown title | Kalvebod Brygge (Ntkredit); 55.669229°N 12.575212°E | Per Kirkeby | | 2002 | Ref |

== Amager ==
| Image | Title / individual commemorated | Location | Sculptor | Created | Installed | Source |
|---|---|---|---|---|---|---|
| | The Arc; Arken | Islands Brygge | Harvey Martin | | 1988 | Ref |
| | Blue Fan Sculpture; Blå vifteskulptur | [Remissevej | Egon Fischer | | 1975 | |
| | Bountry Stone; Borne | Sundbyvester Plads | Bjørn Nørgaard | | | |
| | Calf Lying Down; Liggende kalv | Ungarnsgade (Østrigsgade School) | Gudrun Lauesen | | | Ref |
| | Calf Standing Up; Stående kalv | Urmagerstien (Dyvekeskolen) | Gudrun Lauesen | | 1972 | |
| | Cow About to Stand Up; Ko, der er i færd med at rejse sig | Stadsgraven | Mogens Bøggild | | 1955 | |
| | Danish Aviators Memorial | Stadsgraven | Einar Utzon-Frank | | 1938 | |
| | Daydreamer (Dagdrømmeren) | Moselgade, Lergravsvej og Wittenberggade 55.661773°N 12.61334°E | Jesper Neergaard | | 2003 | Ref |
| | East of the, and West of the Moon; Østen for solen of vesten for månen | Sundbyøster Plads | Kunstnergruppen Arabesk and Ebbe Laurs Sørensen | | 2003 | |
| | Amager People; Amagerfolk | Eberts Villaby Christian II's Allé 55.655309°N 12.606557°E | Adam Hansen | | 1894 | Ref |
| | Lauritz P. Holmblad | Amager Hospital | Ludvig Brandstrup | | 1899 | |
| | Memorial to Fallen Members of the Danish Resistance Movement | Christmas Møllers Plads / Stadsgraven | Morten Nielsen | | 1949 | |
| | Memorial to Fallen Soldiers from the 7th Artillery | Artillerivej | | | 1979 | |
| | Plato's Cave; Platons hule | Havneparken | Christian Lemmerz | | 1997 | |
| | Sculpture in Three Parts | Center Boulevard | Peter Bonnén | | 1971 | Ref |
| | Sportswoman - Sportspige | Sundbyvester Park | Povl Søndergaard | | 1939 | |
| | Standing Calf | Dyveke School | Gudrun Lauesen | | 1972 | Ref |
| | Ulrik Birch Memorial | Stadsgraven | Georg Ulmer | | 1916 | |
| | Woman Combing Her Hair | Amagerbrogade | Gunnar Hammerich | | 1941 | Ref |

== Bispebjerg ==
| Image | Title / individual commemorated | Location | Sculptor | Created | Installed | Source |
|---|---|---|---|---|---|---|
| | Amalie Skram | Bispebjerg Cemetery; 55.714481°N 12.530873°E | Per Ung | | 1996 | Ref |
| | Århuspigen | Tagensvej (Typografernes Stiftelse) | Kai Nielsen | | 1937 | Ref |
| | Boy Playing with a Ball | Emdrup Søgård | Sigrid Lütken | | 1854 | Ref |
| | Boy with Goat (Dreng med ged) | Frederikssundsvej | Otto Evens | | 1854 | Ref |
| | Denmark During The Occupation (Danmark under besættelsen) | Genforeningspladsen | Johannes Bjerg | | 1951 | Ref |
| | Dynamic Growth (Dynamisk vækst) | Tagensvej | Børge Jørgensen | | 1988 | |
| | Farewell Scene (Afskedsscene) | Bispebjerg Cemetery | Povl Søndergaard | | 1949 | Ref |
| | From Death to Resurrection (Fra døden til opstandelsen? | Bispebjerg Cemetery | Mathilius Schack Elo | | 1942 | Ref |
| | Girl Fixing Her Hair (Pige, der ordner sit hår) | Lersøparken | Povl Søndergaard | | 1931 | |
| | Larva; Larve | Haraldsgade | Lily Troelsø Borring | | 1993 | |
| | Lazarus | Bispebjerg Hospital; 55.714°N 12.540°E | Christian Lemmerz | | 2017 | Ref |
| | Legandary Creature; Fabeldyr | Tagensvej | Henry Heerup | | 1901 | |
| | Little Gefion (Lille Gefion) | Bispebjerg Hospital; 55.713233°N 12.54054°E | Anders Bundsgaard | | 1913 | Ref |
| | Memorial to Grundtvigs Højskole | Haraldsgade / Lersø Parkallé | Hans Wilhelm Larsen and Tue Myling-Petersen | | 1956 | |
| | Man and Woman; Mand og pige | Mågevej (Genforeningspladsen) | Povl Søndergaard | | 1834 | Ref |
| | Memorial to Mayor Jens Jensen | Bispebjerg Hospital | | | 1913 | |
| | Mohandas Karamchand (Mahatma) Gandhi) | Mågevej (Ghandis Plads) | Sankho Chaudhuri | | 1984 | Ref |
| | Naked Youth; Møgen Ung Mand | Bispebjerg Cemetery | Knud Nellemose | | | |
| | Snowy Owl; Sneugle | Frederiksborgvej | Gunnar Westman | | 1968 | |
| | The Humane Nurse; Den Humane Sygeplejerske | Bispebjerg Hospital | Jens Jacob Bregnø | | 1941 | |
| | The Joy of Recovery: Love for the Sick; Glæden ved genvundet helbred; Kærligheden mod de syge | Bispebjerg Hospital | Rasmus Harboe | | 1907–13 | |
| | Tukak Maskespil | Bispebjerg Hospital | Ejgil Westergaard | | 1988 | |
| | Tukak Masque | Bispebjerg Hospital | Ejgil Westergaard | | 1988 | Ref |
| | Woman on Box (Kone på kasse) | Bispebjerg Hospital; 55.696211°N 12.560691°E | Hanne Varming | | 1990 | Ref |
| | Young Man with Discus | Lersøparken | Knud Nellemose | | 1942 | |

== Brønshøj-Husum ==
| Image | Title / individual commemorated | Location | Sculptor | Created | Installed | Source |
|---|---|---|---|---|---|---|
| | Granite sculpture Granitskulptur | Svenskelejren (Bellahøj School) | Poul Bækhøj | | | |
| | Høstmand | Brønshøj | Jean-Baptiste Claude Eugène Guillaume | | | |
| | Memorial to the Swedish military camp Carlstad and the Assault of Copenhagen on 1 February 1659 | Brønshøj Torv | John Cornelius Rægaard Andreasen | | 2009 | |
| | Mother With Child; Mor med barn | Svenskelejren (Bellahøj School) | Svend Lindhart | | 1940 | |
| | Studying Girl | Blågårds Plads | Husum Bypark (Korsager Allé) | | 1934 | Ref |
| | Turkey; Kalkun | Tingbjerg | Gunnar Westman | | 1960 | Ref |
| | Two Cats Cleaning Each Other; Kalkun | Voldparken] | Anker Hoffmann | | 1964-68 | Ref |

== Valby ==
| Image | Title / individual commemorated | Location | Sculptor | Created | Installed | Source |
|---|---|---|---|---|---|---|
| | And Day Dawns with its Thousand Demands; Og dagen kalder med sine tusinde krav | Valby Langgade | Anders Bundgaard | | 1929-35 | Ref |
| | Baby Cuckoo; Gøgeunge | Annexstræde | Gunnar Westman | | 1963 | |
| | Crucifix | | | | | |
| | Discobolus; Diskoskasteren | Valby Idrætspark | Unknown | 5th century BC | | |
| | The Olsen Gang | Valby Tingsted | Theo Larsen | 2925 | 2025 | |
| | Rain Sleep Blue Kiss; Regn søvn blå kys | Herman Bangs Plads | Søren Ulrik Thomsen and Rasmus Koch | | 2914 | |
| | Sea Devil | Valby Park Acidophile Garden | Henry Heerup | | 1970 | Ref |
| | Seated Poodle (Siddende puddel) | Druehaven (Margrethehjemmet); 55.649426°N 12.498603°E | Gudrun Lauesen | | 1978 | Ref |
| | Skurestribesten | Valby Park | None (natural) | | 1959 | |
| | Sons of Cain; Kains efterkommere | Lyshøj Allé | Paul Landowski | | | |
| | Troll that smells Christian blood Trold, der vejrer kristenblod | Jesus Church 55.665774°N 12.521799°E | Niels Hansen Jacobsen | | 2002 | Ref |
| | Town Band | Sjælør Boulevard | Ejgil Westergaard | | 1975 | Ref |
| | The Good Shepherd | Jesus Church 55.665066°N 12.522231°E | Aksel Hansen | | 1781 | Ref |
| | Water Carrier | Gammel Køge Landevej | August Keil | | | Ref |
| | Woman with Dogs; Konen med hundene | Valby Tingplads | Hanne Varming | | | |
| | Untitled | Toftegårds Plads | Jens-Flemming Sørensen | | 1982 | |

== Vanløse ==
| Image | Title / individual commemorated | Location | Sculptor | Created | Installed | Source |
|---|---|---|---|---|---|---|
| | Column; Søjle | Vanløse Torv) | Peter Stuhr | | 2010 | |
| | Mother Groa; Mor Groa | Ålekistevej (Vanløse School) | Tove Ólafsson | | 1961 | |
| | Sculpture; Skulptur | Vanløsehøj (Kirkebjerg School) | Edgar Funch | | 1960 | |
| | Secret; Hemmeligheden | af Sallingvej, Jyllingevej | Jens Jacob Bregnø | | 1939 | |
| | Youth on Horseback | Rødkilde Plads | Vilhelm Bissen | | 1883 | Ref |

== Suburbs ==
=== Gentofte Municipality ===
| Image | Title / individual commemorated | Location | Sculptor | Created | Installed | Source |
|---|---|---|---|---|---|---|
| | Alphabet Turèll; Alfabet Turèll | Dan Turèlls Plads | Kenn André Stilling | | 2010 | |
| | Andreas Peter Bernstorff | Bernstorff Park | Andreas Paulsen | | 1904 | |
| | Bernstorff Memorial; Bernstorffstøtten | Lyngbyvej | Johannes Wiedewelt | | 1783 | |
| | Caryatid; Karyatid | Øregård Park | Unknown | | | |
| | Emiliekilde | Kystvejen | Nicolai Abildgaard | | 1782 | |
| | Five-Way Monument; Femvejsmonumentet | Jægersborg Allé | Anders Bundgaard | | 1913 | |
| | Fish with Basin; Fisk over kumme | Mineralvandsgården | Gunnar Westman | | 1972 | |
| | The Foot; Foden | Mineralvandsgården | Peter Brandes | | 1994 | |
| | Freedom Monument; Frihedsmonumentet | Bernstorffsvej (Gentofte Town Hall) | Axel Poulsen | 1962 | 1954 | |
| | Guapa | Øregaard Park | Gottfred Eickhoff | 1942 | 1959 | |
| | Harald's Spring; Haraldskilde | Øregård Park | Unknown | 1838 | | |
| | Hercules Column | Ordrupvej (Holmegårdsparken) | Egon Fischer | 1988 | 1989 | |
| | Horse With Foal; Hest med føl | Øregård Park | Helen Schou | 1940 | | |
| | Hermes; Herme | Øregård Park | Unknown | | | |
| | Kneeling Woman; Knælende kvinde | Øregård Park | Kai Nielsen | | | |
| | Knud Rasmussen | Kystvejen (Hvidørepynten) | Povl Søndergård | | 1969 | |
| | Leda Without the Swan; Lade uden svane | Øregård Park | Kai Nielsen | 1920 | 1983 | |
| | The Liberation; Befrielsen | Øregård Park | Thyra Boldsen | | | |
| | Lion; Løve | Bakkegårdsskolen | Henrik Starcke | 1959 | 1960 | |
| | Lying Mother with Two Children; Liggende moder med to børn | Øregård Park | Kai Nielsen | | 2010 | |
| | Mother With Child; Moder med barn | Vellevue Beach | Helen Schou | | | |
| | Mulch Man; Muldmand | Øregård Park | Poul Agger | 1978 | 1979 | |
| | Obelisk Commemorating King Frederick VIII and Queen Louise | Charlottenborg Palace | | | 1938 | |
| | Postmaster Einar Holbøll | Charlottenlund Stationsplads | Charles Arvesen | | 1948 | |
| | Resurrection; Opstandelse | Ordrup Cemetery (Chapel) | Einar Utzon-Frank | | 1927 | |
| | Sculpture Garden; Skulpturhaven | Bernstorffsvej (Gentofte Town Hall) | Allan Schmidt | | 1978 | |
| | Topos | Bryggertorvet (Tuborg North) | Torben Ebbesen | | 1996 | |
| | Sisyphos Walk; Sisyphosvandring | Øregård Park | Thyra Boldsen | | 1918 | |
| | Synthesis of Life; Syntese over liv | Adolphsvej (Kildeskovshallen) | Børge Jørgensen | | 1979 | |
| | Yoyng Athlete with Geometer Larva; Ung atlet med målerlarve | Knud Rasmussens Vej (Dyssegårdsparken) | Carl Mortensen | 1912 | 1959 | |
| | No title | Ordrup Park | Bente Sørensen | | 1979 | |

=== Hørsholm Municipality ===
| Image | Title / individual commemorated | Location | Sculptor | Created | Installed | Source |
|---|---|---|---|---|---|---|
| | Stolberg Monument | Søndre Jagtvej | Nicolas-Henri Jardin | | 1766 | |

=== Hvidovre Municipality ===
| Image | Title / individual commemorated | Location | Sculptor | Created | Installed | Source |
|---|---|---|---|---|---|---|
| | A Mother; En moder | Hvidovrevej 55.656567°N 12.472989°E | Hans Peder Pedersen-Dan | 1908 | 2005 | |

=== Lyngby-Taarbæk Municipality ===
| Image | Title / individual commemorated | Location | Sculptor | Created | Installed | Source |
|---|---|---|---|---|---|---|
| | A Neapolitan Fisherman teaching his Son to play the Flute (En neapolitansk fisker lærer sin søn at spille på fløjte ) | Rustenborgvej 55.772779°N 12.497018°E | Otto Evens | | 1920 | Ref |
| | Aasiveeraq | Lyngby Kongevej (Lyngby Nordre Mølle) 55.774179°N 12.498029°E | Christian Rosing | | 1996 | Ref |
| | Fingerfryd | Dronningens Vænge 55.780015°N 12.491409°E | Søren West | | 2001 | Ref |
| | Girl; Pige | Byagervej (Børnehuset Mælkevejen) 55.793034°N 12.471253°E | Just Nielsen Sondrup | | 1949 | Ref |
| | Hjortespring | Lyngby Kongevej 55.791432°N 12.48616°E | Johannes Hansen | | 1961 | Ref |
| | Hymne til himmel og jord | Solsikkemarken (Plejecenter Virumgård) 55.783914°N 12.484178°E | Jun-Ichi Inoue | | 2003 | Ref |
| | Konferensraad Vilh. Jørgensen | Viggo Jarls Vej (Viggo Jarls Kollegium) 55.79954147338867°N 12.493664741516113°E | Viggo Jarl | | 1973 | Ref |
| | Sitting Girl; Siddende pige) | Lundtofteparken 55.796465°N 12.524285°E | Frantz V. Hansen | | 1956 | Ref |
| | Søjlefigur med glasstak til Lyngby | Stadsbiblioteket, Lyngby Hovedgade 55.77333°N 12.499298°E | Anita Jørgensen | | 1994 | Ref |
| | Spring (Forår) | Ulrikkenborg Plads 55.767476°N 12.50207°E | Just Nielsen Sondrup | | 1934 | Ref |
| | Tankefuld kvinde | Sorgenfri Cemetery 55.779641°N 12.489792°E | Olga Wagner | | 1945 | Ref |
| | Julius Thomsen | Udenfor Bygn 55.787471°N 12.521037°E | August Saabye | | 1974 | Ref |
| | Vækstdyr | Skovbrynet (Police) | Stine Ring Hansen | | 1997 | Ref |
| | Woman (Kvinde) | Baunehøj, Bauneporten 55.777626°N 12.519279°E | Anker Hoffmann | | 1959 | Ref |

=== Rudersdal Municipality ===
| Image | Title / individual commemorated | Location | Sculptor | Created | Installed | Source |
|---|---|---|---|---|---|---|
| | Henrik Gerner | Henrik Gerners Vej | Johannes Kragh | | 1917 | Ref |
