= Lille Strandstræde 13–15 =

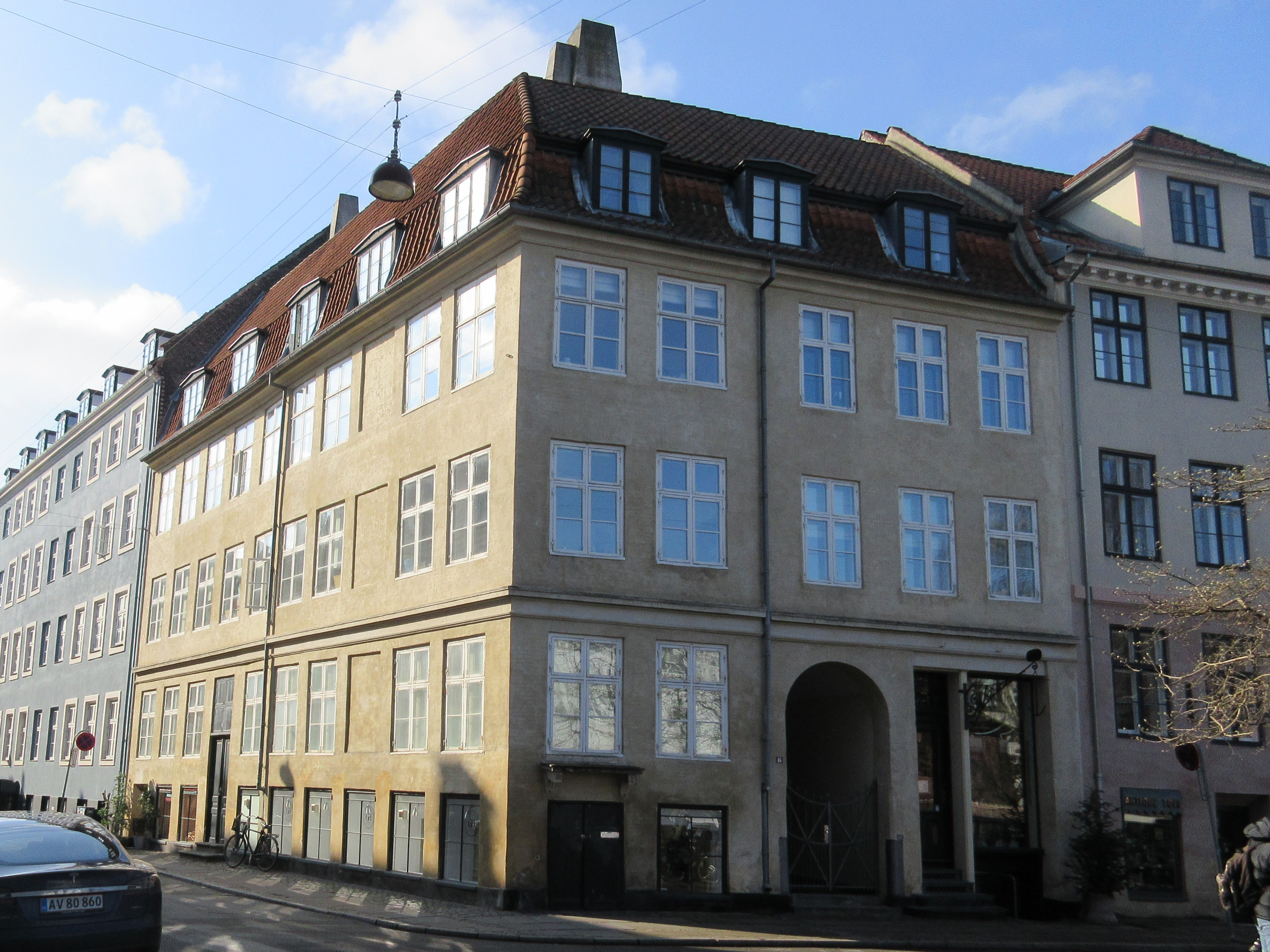

General information
- Location: Copenhagen
- Country: Denmark
- Coordinates: 55°40′52″N 12°35′23.28″E
- Completed: 1758 (No. 15), 1852 (No. 13)

Lille Strandstræde 13–15 is a property situated at the corner of Lille Strandstræde and the small nameless square that is formed where the street joins Store Strandstræde on the south side of Sankt Annæ Plads in central Copenhagen, Denmark.

The corner property was from at least the 1750s to circa 1890 owned by distillers. Their distillery was located on the upper floors of a still existing warehouse in the courtyard. The ground floor of the warehouse was used as a cow stable. Part of the building fronting the street (first No. 13 and later No. 15) was also used by the distillery. No. 13 dates from 1852. No. 15 dates from 1758 but was refurbished in 1852. The entire complex was listed in the Danish registry of protected buildings and places in 1950. In front of the building is a small garden complex with a bronze cast of Otto Evens's 1859 statue Neapolitan Fisherman Teaches His Son to Play the Flute.

== Architecture ==
Lille Strandstræde 13–15 is a corner building constructed with three storeys over a walk-out basement, with a 19-bay long facade towards Lille Strandstræde and a five-bay-long facade towards the small nameless square. An arched gateway in the facade that fronts the square provides access to the central courtyard. The mansard roof is clad with red tiles. It features five dormer windows towards Lille Strandstræde and another three towards the square. A four-storey former warehouse is located in the courtyard.

== Today ==
The building contains two shops in the basement, one on the ground floor to the right of the gateway, and residential apartments on the upper floors and the remaining part of the ground floor.
