= Lersøparken =

Park in Copenhagen, Denmark

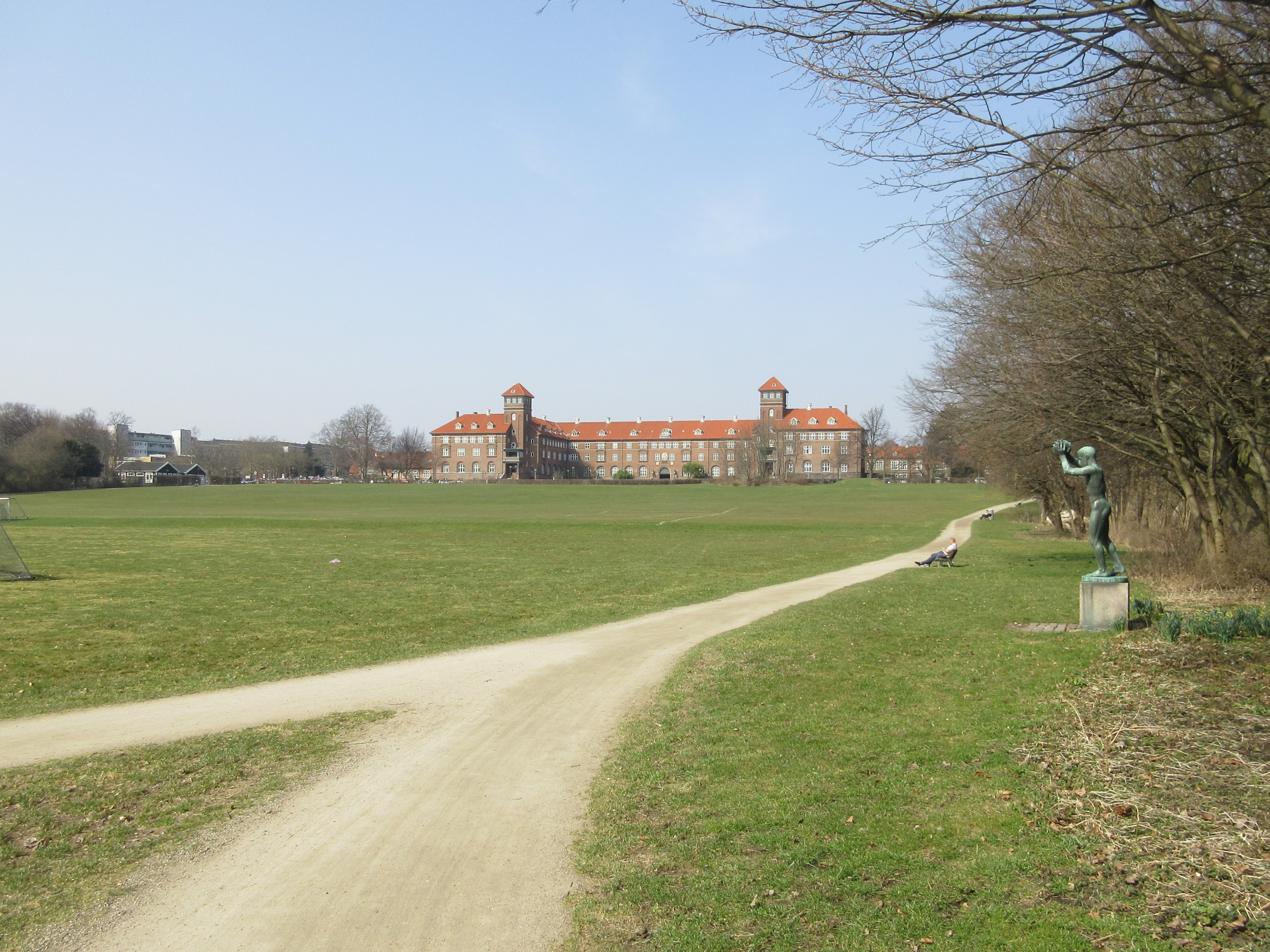
- Interactive map of Lersøparken
- Type: Public
- Location: Bispebjerg, Copenhagen
- Coordinates: 55°42′35″N 12°32′39″E
- Area: ?
- Created: 1849s
- Owner: Copenhagen Municipality

Lersøparken (The Lersø Park) is a public park located on the east side of Tagensvej and just south of Bispebjerg Hospital in the Bispebjerg district of Copenhagen, Denmark. The greenway Lersøstien (The Lersø Path) runs through the park and an adjacent area with allotments.

== History ==
A natural lake known as Lersøen was originally located at the site. In 1750, it stretched all the way from present-day Lyngbyvej to the northern end of Nørrebrogade. Its natural drainage was blocked and replaced by a canal known as Lygte Å to improve the supply of water to Copenhagen. The lake turned into a marshland in the 19th century. Basket makers from Copenhagen used the area for cultivation of reeds. Towards the end of the century the lake came into use as a garbage dump and landfill and its surroundings were gradually redeveloped after the parish of Brønshøj was merged into Copenhagen in 1901.

The Lersø Park was established in 1908-13 and the adjacent allotments were established in 1909-20.

== Facilities ==
The northern part of the park has been used as football fields since circa 1945 and is the homeground of Bispebjerg Boldklub. The first DBU match at the site was played in 1947. Other facilities include a playground that was most recently renovated in 2009.

== Public art ==
Povl Søndergaard's statue Girl Fixing Her Hair is located next to The Lersø Path. It is from 1931 and was a gift from the Foundation for the Advancement of Artistic Purposes (Fonden til kunstneriske Formaals Fremme). Knud Nellemose's statue Young Man with Discus was installed in the southeastern corner of the park in 1942. It was a gift from the same foundation. Nellemose received the Eckersberg Medal for the statue in 1944.
