= Nellemose =

Nellemose is a surname. Notable people with the surname include:

- Karin Nellemose (1905–1993), Danish actress
- Knud Nellemose (1908–1997), Danish sculptor
