= Two Lions (sculpture) =

Outdoor bronze group sculpture

- To løver (Danish)
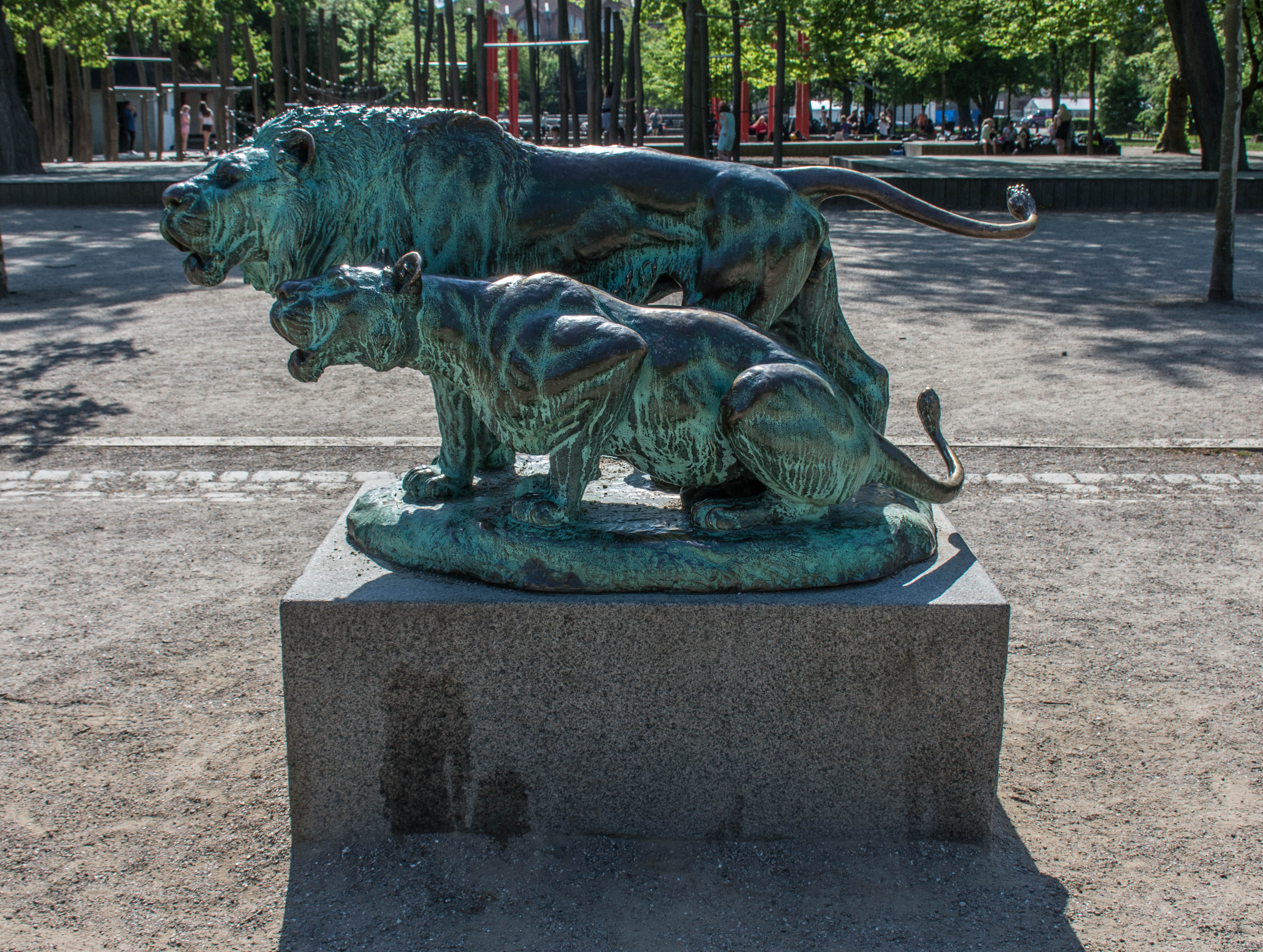
- Artist: Lauritz Jensen
- Year: 1905
- Type: bronze
- Dimensions: 144 cm × 103 cm × 165 cm (57 in × 41 in × 65 in)
- Location: Copenhagen, Denmark; 55.704978°N 12.574667°E

Two Lions (Danish: To Løver), also known as The Disgruntled (Danish: De Utilfredse), is an outdoor bronze group sculpture of two lions situated in Fælledparken in the Østerbro district of Copenhagen, Denmark.

== Description ==
The sculpture is situated in an area of Fælledparken known as Den Franske Plads (The French Square). It depicts two lions, one male and one female. The male lion stands up while its female counterpart is lying down.

== History ==
The sculpture was created by Lauritz Jensen in 1905 and a bronze cast of the sculpture was subsequently presented to the City of Copenhagen by the Victor Freund Grant (Victor Freunds Legat). Jensen wanted the sculpture placed at Langelinie and a location in Søndermarken was also considered but it was ultimately installed in the garden complex at present-day Israels Plads. The sculpture was later moved to a new location outside the entrance to Fælledparken on Østerbrogade. Another reason for the move was fear that a tail might break or bend, or that it might suffer other damage, since local use tended to use it for "gymnastic exercises". In 1915 it was proposed to protect it at its new location by installing a surrounding rough iron fence.

The sculpture was moved to a small mound a little further to the west when the site was redesigned in 2010. In 2012 the sculpture was moved to its current location close to Serridslevvej in Fælledparken.

== See also ==
- List of public art in Copenhagen
