= Statue of Søren Kierkegaard =

Statue in Copenhagen, Denmark

Søren Kierkegaard
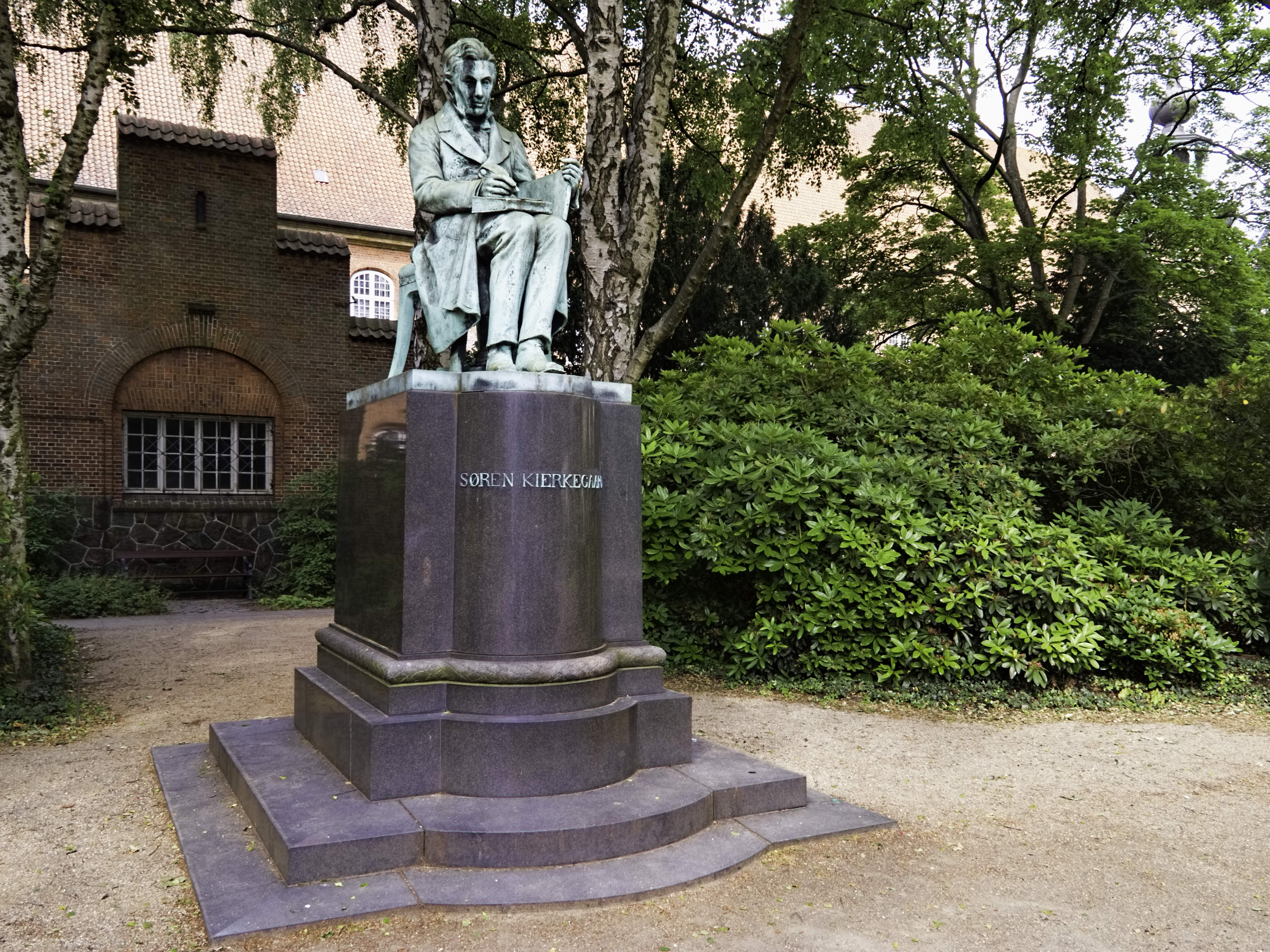
- The statue in the Royal Library Garden
- Artist: Louis Hasselriis
- Year: 1918
- Medium: Bronze
- Subject: Søren Kierkegaard
- Location: Copenhagen

The statue of Søren Kierkegaard is located in the Royal Library Garden on Slotsholmen in central Copenhagen, Denmark. It was unveiled in 1918 but is based on an older statuette by Louis Hasselriis.

== Description ==
Kierkegaard is depicted sitting on a chair in the process of writing something on a sheet of paper with a quill. Next to him are some books.

== History ==
The monument is based on a statuette created by Louis Hasselriis in 1878, 1879. It was enlarged by the sculptors Carl Aarsleff and H.P. Petersen-Dan and cast in bronze in Lauritz Tasmussen's Bronze Foundry in 1918.

== Other statues of Søren Kierkegaard ==
Hasselriis' original plaster statuette is located in the Danish National Gallery. The enlarged plaster copy was part of Aarsleff's private collection and later given to Østfyns Museum. It was for many years on display in the assembly hall of Nyborg Gymnasium but is now located outside the Søren Kierkegaard Auditorium in the University of Copenhagen's Department of Theology in Copenhagen.

A second Søren Kierkegaard statue in Copoenhagen is located on the exterior of Frederik's Church. It is from 1972 and was created by Knud Nellemose.
