= Statue of Niels W. Gade =

Monument in Copenhagen, Denmark

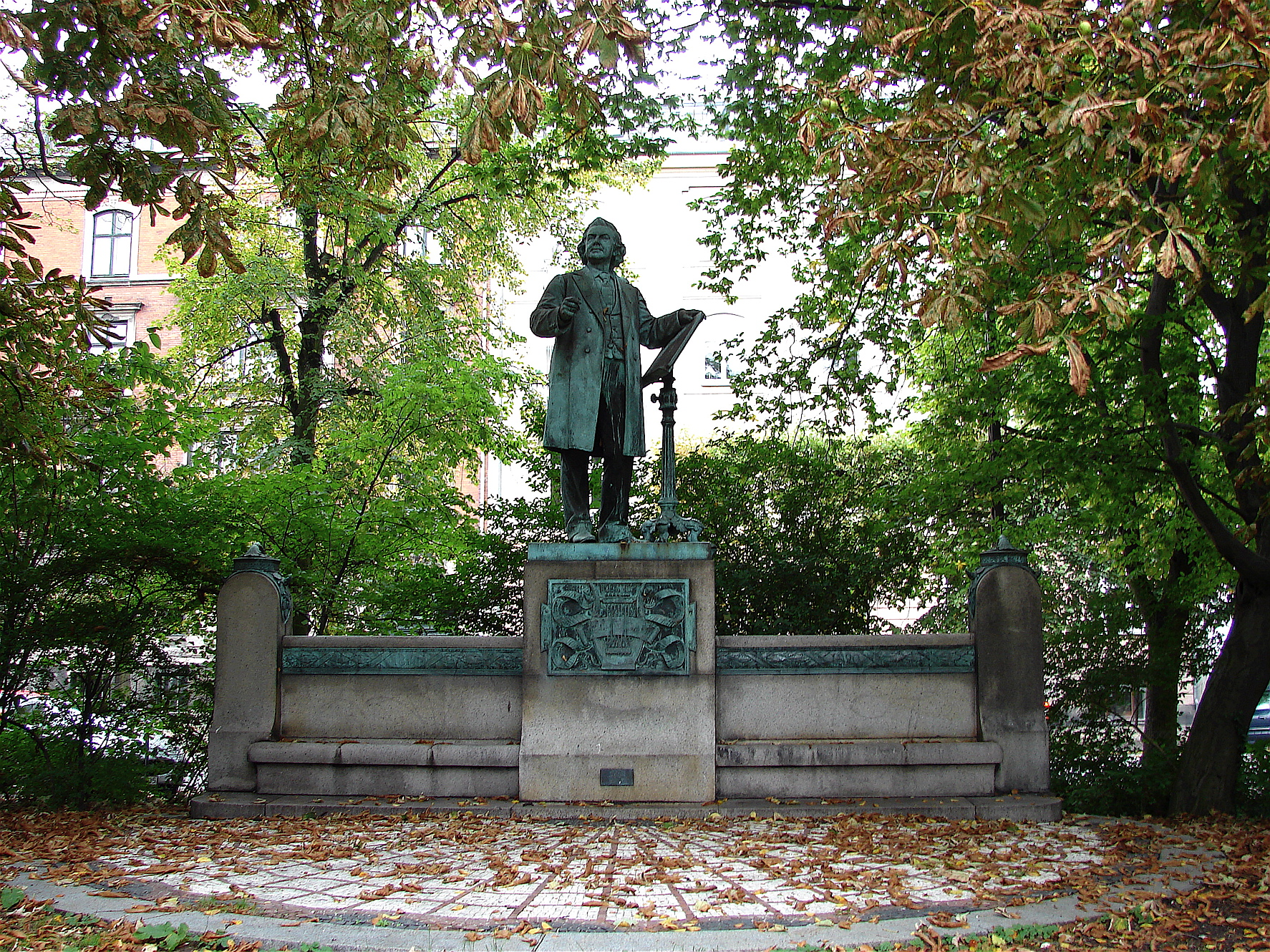
- Artist: Vilhelm Bissen
- Year: 1897
- Medium: Bronze
- Subject: Niels Gade conducting Elverskud
- Location: Copenhagen

The Statue of Niels W. Gade is a statue of Danish composer Niels W. Gade located in Østre Anlæg in Copenhagen, Denmark. It depicts Gade in the process of conducting Elverskud, one of his most famous works. The monument was originally located on Sankt Annæ Plads but moved to its current location in May 1934.

== Description ==
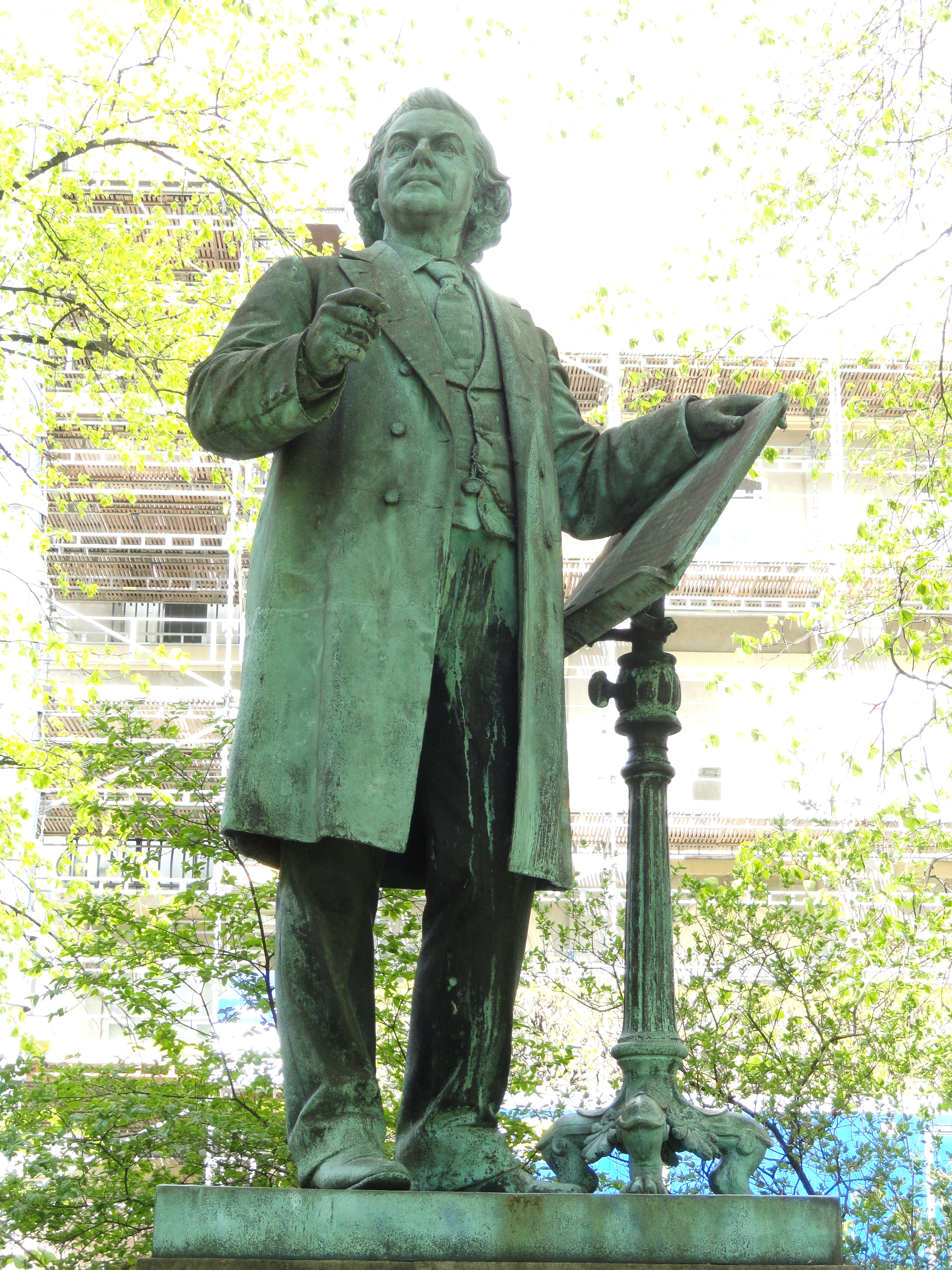
The statue

The monument consists of a bronze statue of Niels Gade standing on a granite pedestal which incorporates a long bench in its design. The monument measures 455 x 640 x 107 cm. It is situated next to the fence along Stockholmsgade (at No. 45).

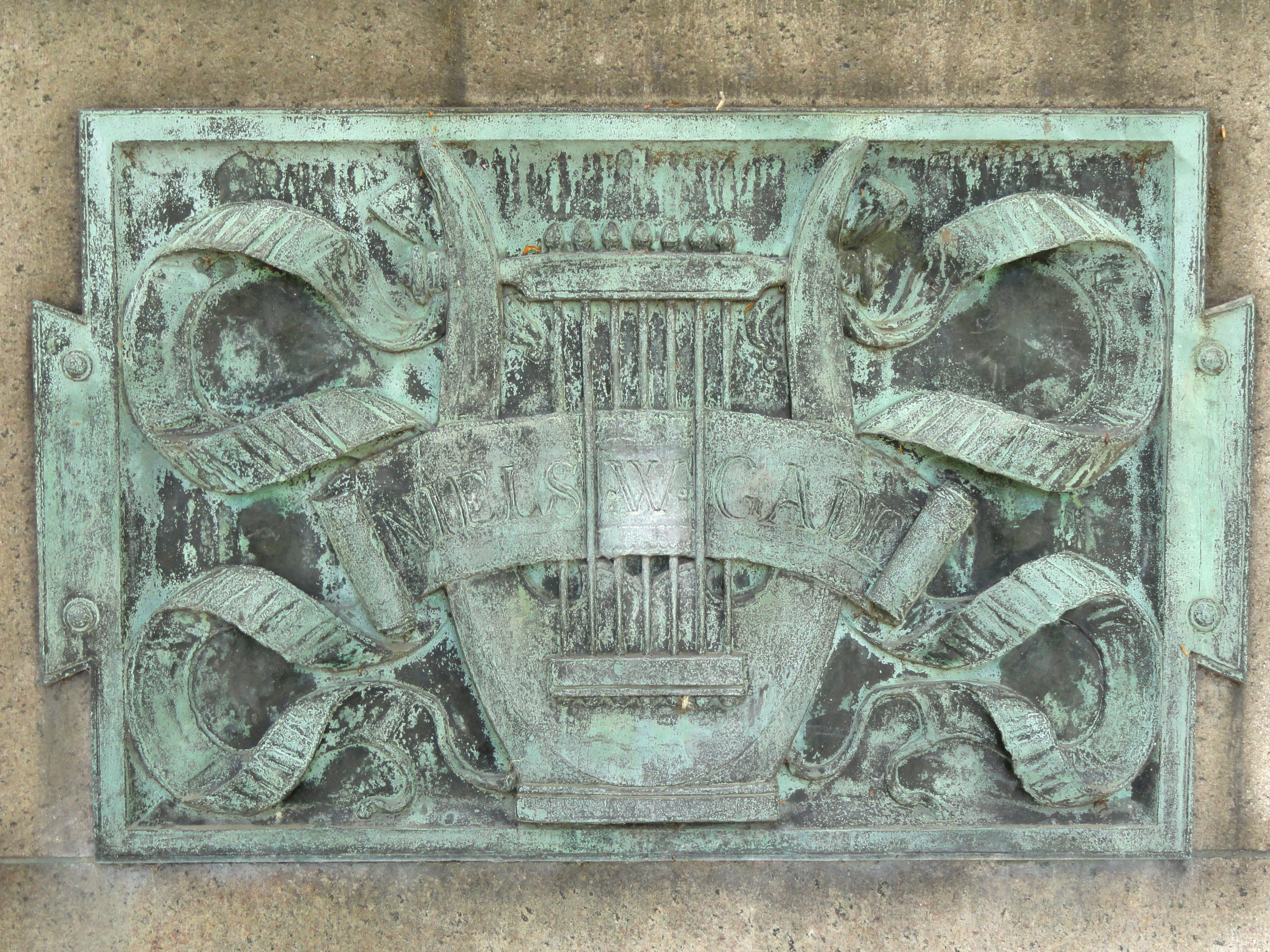
The relief on the pedestal

Gade is shown standing on a raised podium with a music stand. The conductor's score in front of him is open on a page from Elverskud, one of his most popular works, and the name of the works is inscribed on its rear side. On the pedestal is a relief featuring a lyre with the composer's name in capital relief lettering. A band on the bench is inscribed with some of Gade's most well-known works: " "OSSIAN", "SYMFONI I C Mol", "1817", "ELVERSKUD", "COMALA", "FORAARSFAN-TASIER", "KALANUS", "1890", "KORSFARERNE" and "PSYCHE"

== History ==
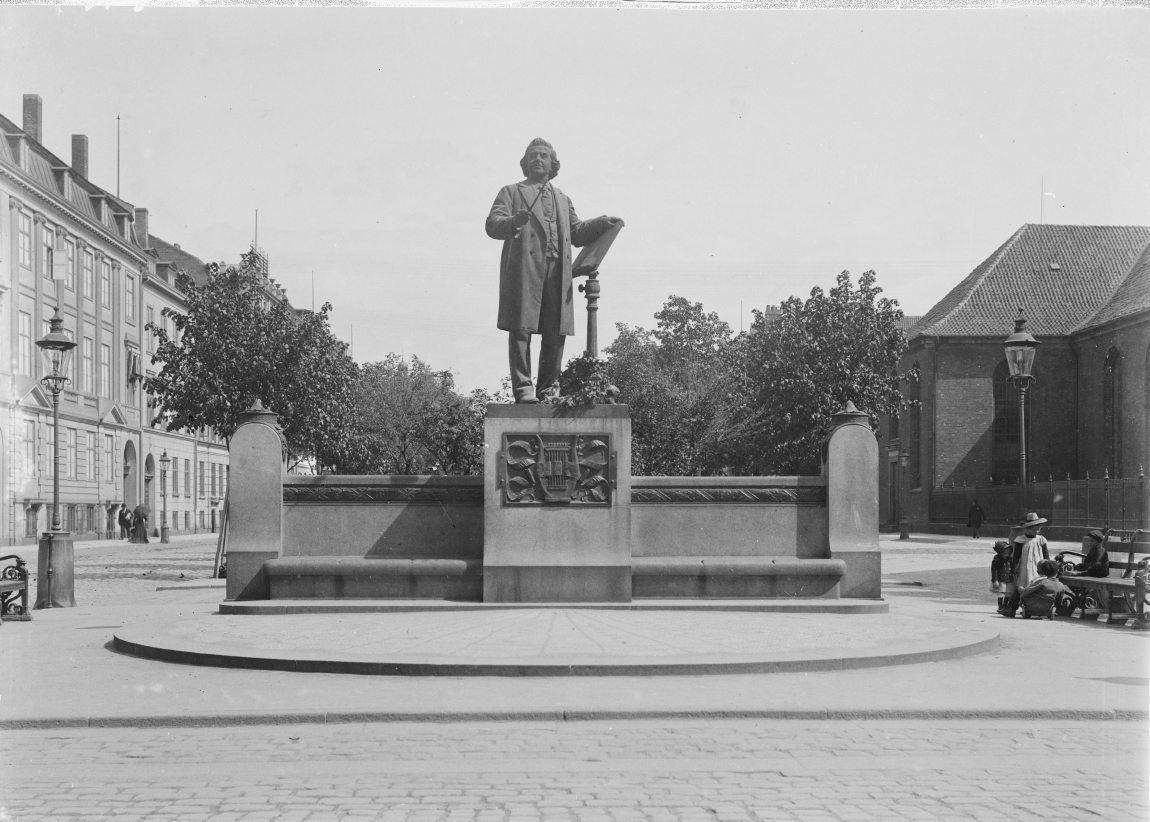
The Niels Gade Memorial photographed by Fritz Theodor Benzen at its original location on Sankt Annæ Plads

The composer Niels W. Gade died in 1890. After a few years a committee of private citizens began to work for the creation of a monument that would commemorate the composer. A site on Sankt Annæ Plads close to the Garrison Church where Gade for many years had worked as organist, was selected. The committee commissioned the sculptor Vilhelm Bissen to design a memorial and the bronze sculpture was cast at Lauritz Rasmussen's bronze foundry. The monument was unveiled on Sankt Annæ Plads on 24 June 1897. The monument was moved to its current location in Østre Anlæg in May 1934.

== See also ==
- List of public art in Copenhagen
