= Reformation Memorial, Copenhagen =

Coordinates: 55.6792°N 12.5718°E

Reformation Memorial
- Reformationsmonumentet
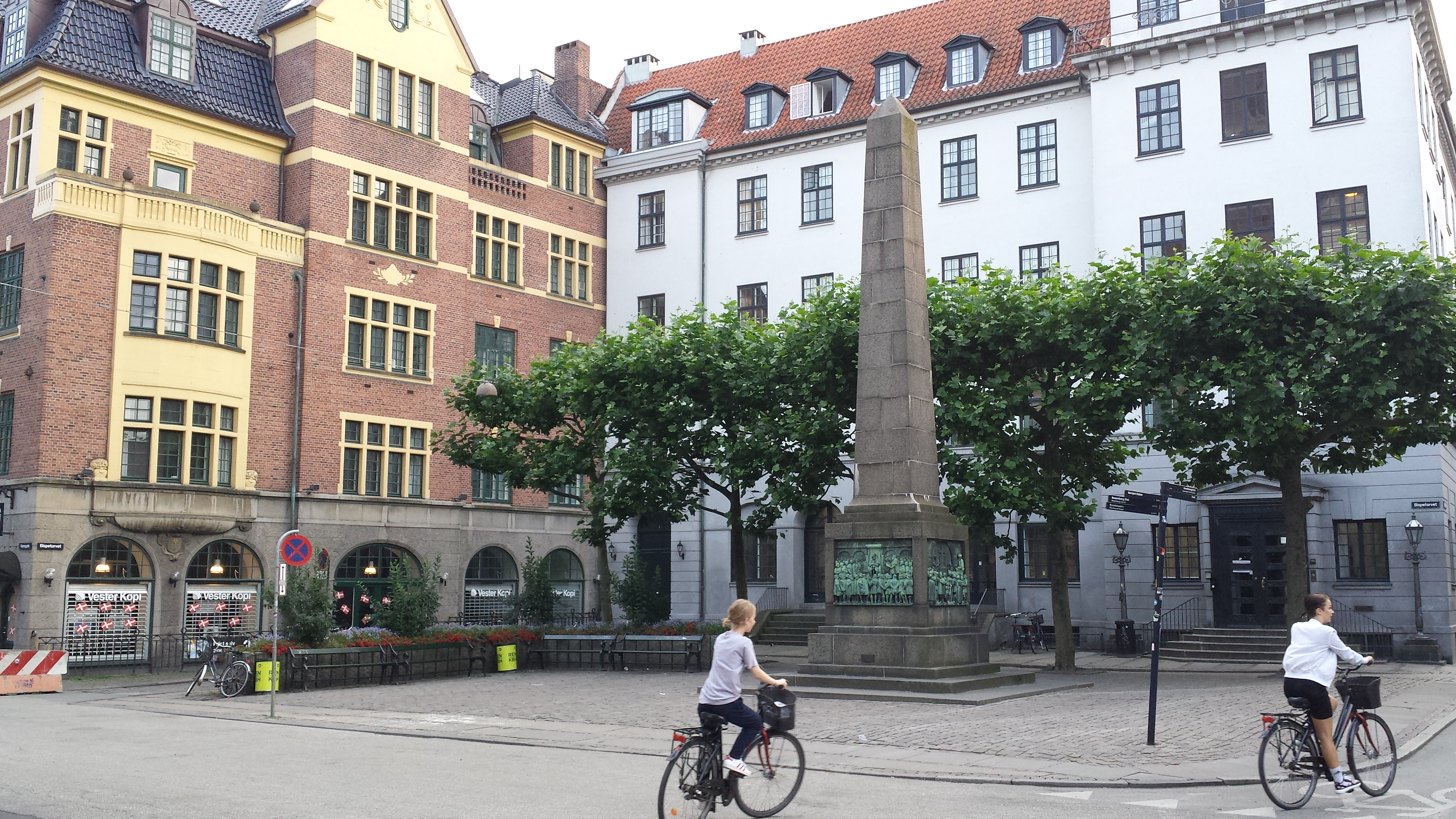
- Interactive map of Reformation Memorial
- Location: Copenhagen, Denmark
- Designer: Max Andersen
- Type: Column
- Material: Granite and bronze

The Reformation Memorial (Danish: Reformationsmonumentet) is a memorial to the Reformation of Denmark located on Bispetorv in central Copenhagen, Denmark.

== History ==
A committee chaired by bishop Hans Fuglsang-Damgaard was set up in 1936 in connection with the 400 years' anniversary of Denmark's transition from Catholicism to the Evangelical-Lutheran faith. The sculptor Max Andersen and the architect Harald Lønborg-Jensen was charged with the design of the monument. It was unveiled on 6 June 1943.

== Design ==
The monument consists of an obelisk featuring a bronze relief on each of its four sides. The relief on the front side depicts the event on Gammeltorv in Copenhagen on 30 October 1536 when Christian III confirmed the Reformation of Denmark. The relief on the left hand side depicts the interruption of Hans Tavsen's service in Greyfriars Church in Viborg by a group of armed men who comes for his arrest. The relief on the rear side depicts the ordination of the first eight Evangelical-Lutheran bishops in Church of Our Lady on 2 September 1537. The relief on the right hand side depicts Peder Palladius' first service after the Reformation. Inscriptions on the granite steps below the reliefs provides information about the subjects:

Front side:
herredagen i københavn vedtager reformationens indførelse 30 oktober 1536	The Council of Noblemen agreed to the introduction of the Reformation 30 October 1536
Left hand side:
hans tavsens prædiken I viborg graabrødre kirke afbrydes af væbnede mænd	Hans Tavsen’s sermon in Viborg in the Greyfriars Church is interrupted by armed men
Rear side:
de evangeliske biskopper indvies i vor frue kirke I københavn 2 September 1537	The evangelical bishops are consecrated in Our Lady’s Church in Copenhagen 2 September 1537
Right hand side:
dansk gudstjeneste efter reformationens indførelse peder palladius prædiker	Danish church service after the introduction of the Reformation, Peder Palladius preaches

== See also ==
- List of public art in Copenhagen
