= Viggo Jarl =

Danish sculptor

- Born: 28 November 1879; Copenhagen, Denmark
- Died: 23 March 1965 (aged 85); Cannes, France
- Occupation: Sculptor

Viggo Jarl (28 November 1879 – 23 March 1965) was a Danish sculptor. His work was part of the sculpture event in the art competition at the 1928 Summer Olympics.
