= Julius Schultz =

Australian cricketer

Personal information
- Born: 25 September 1888; Summertown, South Australia
- Died: 8 July 1966 (aged 77)
- Source: Cricinfo, 25 September 2020

Julius Schultz (25 September 1888 – 8 July 1966) was an Australian cricketer. He played in four first-class matches for South Australia between 1919 and 1922.

== See also ==
- List of South Australian representative cricketers
