= Johannes Hansen (sculptor) =

Danish sculptor (1903–1995)

Johannes Christian Hansen (22 October 1903 – 2 August 1995) was a Danish sculptor. In addition to his sculpted figures of children and interacting couples, he designed a wide variety of glazes and plates for the Knabstrup Keramiske Industri ceramics factory where he was artistic director.

== Biography ==
Born in Copenhagen, Hansen was the son of the pianomaker and amateur artist Jens F. Hansen. He studied at the Royal Danish Academy of Fine Arts, first at the painting school under Ejnar Nielsen, then at the sculpture school under Einar Utzon-Frank (1922–26). During his studies, Hansen spent several months in Munich in 1921, travelled to France and Italy in 1924–25 (including six months in Pisa) and then to Berlin in 1926.

Hansen's naturalistic sculptures are carefully proportioned and often depict children playing the flute. His work includes quietly interacting figures of men and women, as in his Two Young People (1940) on Dronning Louises Bro in Copenhagen.

From 1950 to 1970, he worked as a designer for Knabstrup Keramiske Industri where he was soon promoted to artistic director. He produced a number of ceramic glazes, including the popular Knapstrup tea and coffee sets. Other successful designs include his Storm-P plates and his kitchenware sets. One of his most successful figures is Den fløjtende pige [The Whistling Girl].

== Awards ==
Hansen was awarded the Eckersberg Medal in 1939.
