= Just Nielsen Sondrup =

Danish sculptor (1873–1947)

Just Nielsen Sondrup (2 April 1873 – 21 August 1947) was a Danish sculptor.

== Early life and education ==
Sondrup was born as Just Sondrup Sørensen on 2 April 1873 in Barmer, Sebber Parish, Jutland, the son of merchant Niels Sondrup S. and Karen Marie Justesen. He attended Aalborg Technical School before moving to Copenhagen where he studied under Vilhelm Bissen and Carls Aarslev at the Royal Danish Academy of Fine Arts from 1900 to 1905. He married Nielsine Nielsen Hauge (b. 4 December 1878), a daughter of farmer Niels Nielsen Hass and Kirstine Marie Henriksen, on 3 June 1903 in Vindelev. They constructed a house at Chr. Winthers Vej 26 in Kongens Lyngby in 1905.

He exhibited at Charlottenborg Spring Exhibition in 1904–06, 1908–10, 1914–16, 1918–24, 1926–27, 1929 and 1932–48. He was also represented on Kunstnernes Efterårsudstilling in 1907-08 and 1914.

He died on 21 August 1947 and is buried in Lyngby Cemetery.

== Style ==
Just Nielsen Sondrup specialized in portraits of the common and hard-working people of his time, often farmers, who were depicted in a laudatory, social realistic style. He has also created portraits of prominent people of the province, in a style that suited their status.

He created eight allegorical figures for Folketingssal as well as decorative works for Riddersalen and the Royal Reception Rooms in the new Christiansborg Palace in 1909–27.

== List of works ==
=== Public art, monuments and memorials ===
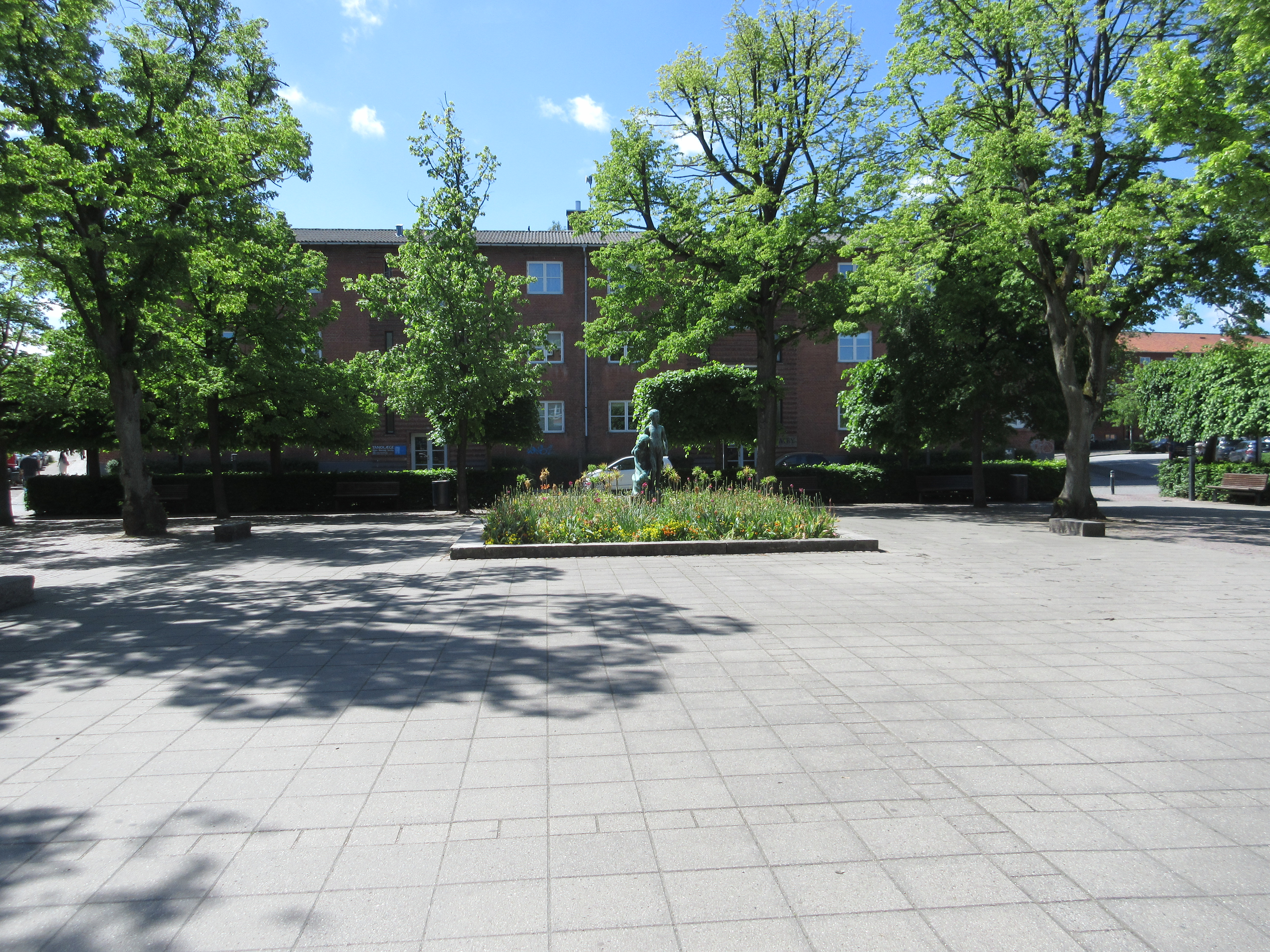
Forår, Ulrikkenborg Plads, Kongens Lyngby

- Jørgen H. Nielsen, Hjørring (1916)
- Cornelia Levetzow, Lyngby Old Cemetery, Kongens Lyngby (1921)
- Steen Steensen Blicher, Aarhus Botanical Gardens, Aarhus (1928)
- N.S. Lorentzen, Gentofte Cemetery, Gentofte (1928)
- Stensamlersken, Kildeparken, Aalborg (1930)
- Forår, Ulrikkenborg Plads, Kongens Lyngby (1934)
- Jysk høstmand, Kildeparken, Aalborg (1937)
- Dreng and Pige, Børnehuset Mælkevejen, Byagervej, Virum (1949)
- * J. Poulsen Grysted (1919, Lystanlæg ved Nibe)
- Apoteker Annæus Nielsen (rejst 1920, smst.)

=== Church art ===
- Maria og Johannes (2 sidefigurer, bemalet træ, til 1400-tals krucifiks, Løgumkloster K.)
- Altar piece, Simon Peter's Church, Kastrup and Ishøj Church, Ishøj (after 1931)

=== Other ===
- Fugletræk (bronze, 1905, Stat.Mus. for Kunst)
- Dreng med en and (statuette, bronze, 1907, Stat. Mus for Kunst)
- En jysk fiskerkone ventende på sin mand (1908, Ålborg Mus.)
- Siddende nøgen lille pige (marble, c. 1923, Stat. Mus. for Kunst)
- St. St. Blicher (statuette, bronze, 1927, Horsens Kunstmus)
- Karen Jeppe (bronze, Statsbibl., Århus)
- J. Lønborg Friis (Vendsyssels Hist. Mus., Hjørring)
