= Henrik Starcke =

Danish sculptor (1899–1973)

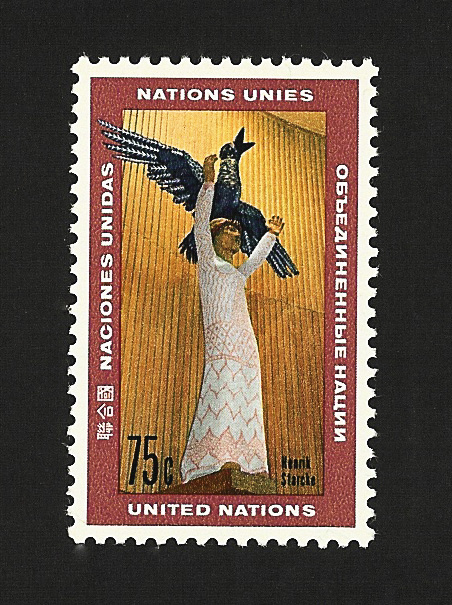
Woman with bird, sculpture by Henrik Starcke at the United Nations building in New York City.

Henrik Starcke (16 April 1899 – 5 June 1973) was a Danish sculptor who created fanciful creatures based on his interest in ancient art.

== Biography ==
Born in Copenhagen, he was the son of the politician and philosopher Carl Nicolai Starcke. He was brought up in a highly cultured environment as his mother was very musical and his father was an accomplished amateur wood carver. Following his father's wishes, he first began to study medicine before studying painting under Ejnar Nielsen at the Royal Danish Academy of Fine Arts (1920–24). In 1925 in Paris, he married the textile artist Dagmar Kaae (1899–1975).

Taking a special interest in ancient art, he travelled widely in the 1920s and 1930s to France, Italy, Greece, Egypt and England. From 1929, he abandoned painting in favour of sculpture. As a sculptor, he was inventive and imaginative, often working with unusual materials such as flint, gravel, brick and rusty nails. His works include two large reliefs at Vestre Cemetery, Begravelse (Burial, 1940–49) and Opstandelse (Resurrection, 1948–49), and Dronning Dagmar (Queen Dagmar) together with Steen Eiler Rasmussen in Ringsted's churchyard.

== Awards ==
In 1940 he was awarded the Eckersberg Medal and in 1960, the Thorvaldsen Medal.
