= Hans Tavsens Park =

Park in Copenhagen, Denmark

Hans Tavsens Plads
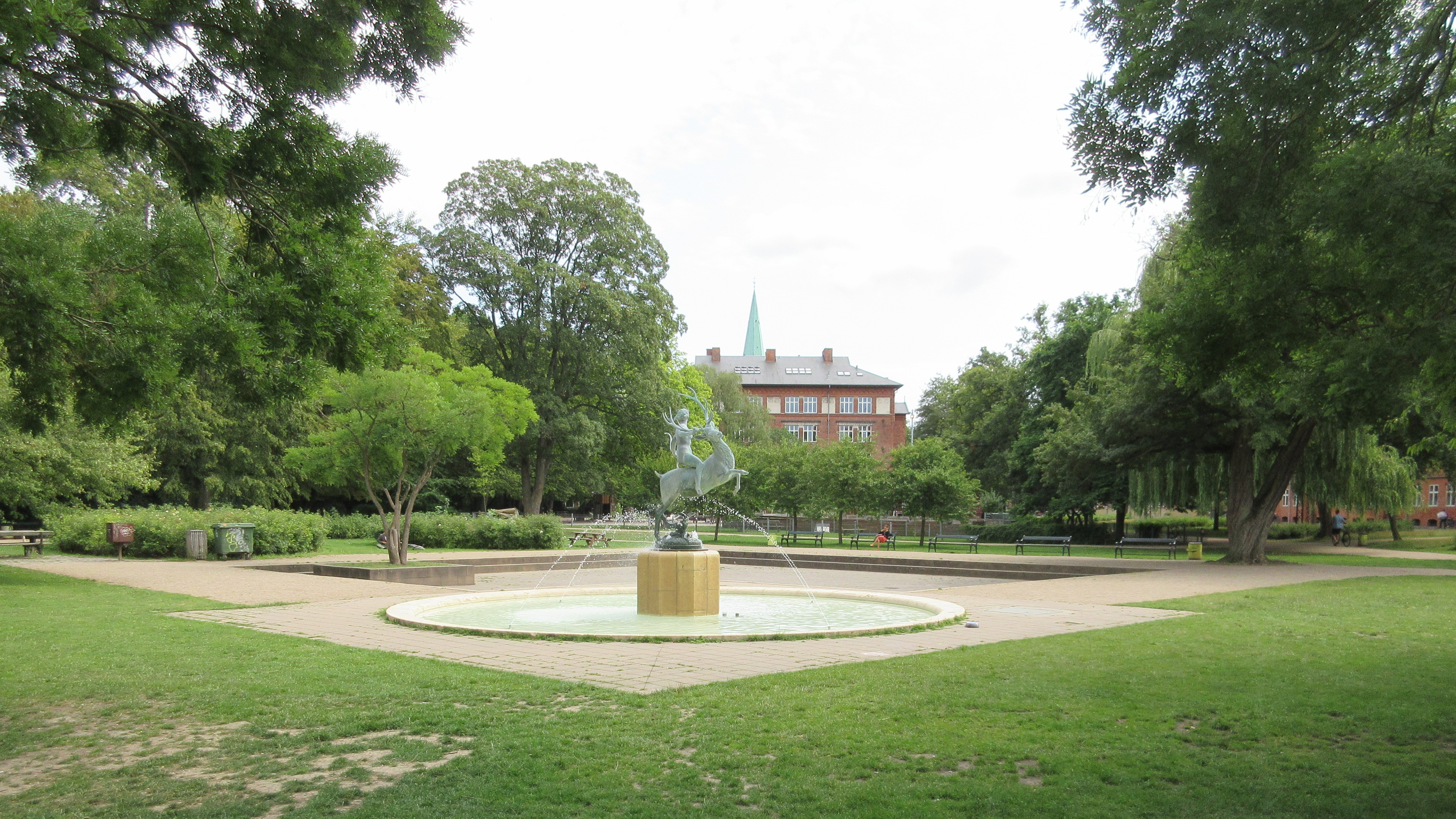
- The central lawn
- Interactive map of Hans Tavsens Plads
- Type: Urban park
- Location: Copenhagen, Denmark
- Coordinates: 55°41′20″N 12°32′49″E
- Created: 1909

Hans Tavsens Park is a public park located adjacent to Hans Tavsens Gade and Assistens Cemetery in the Nørrebro district of Copenhagen, Denmark.

== History ==
The site was formerly part of Assistens Cemetery. It was from 1847 to 1880 used for the burial of people who could not afford a grave inside the walled cemetery. The park was laid out in 1909.

== Design ==
The central part of the park is dominated by lawns and large trees. The southeastern portion of the park is home to a staffed, public playground. The northwestern portion of the park, adjacent to Nørrebro Park School, is used for sports facilities.

== Public art ==
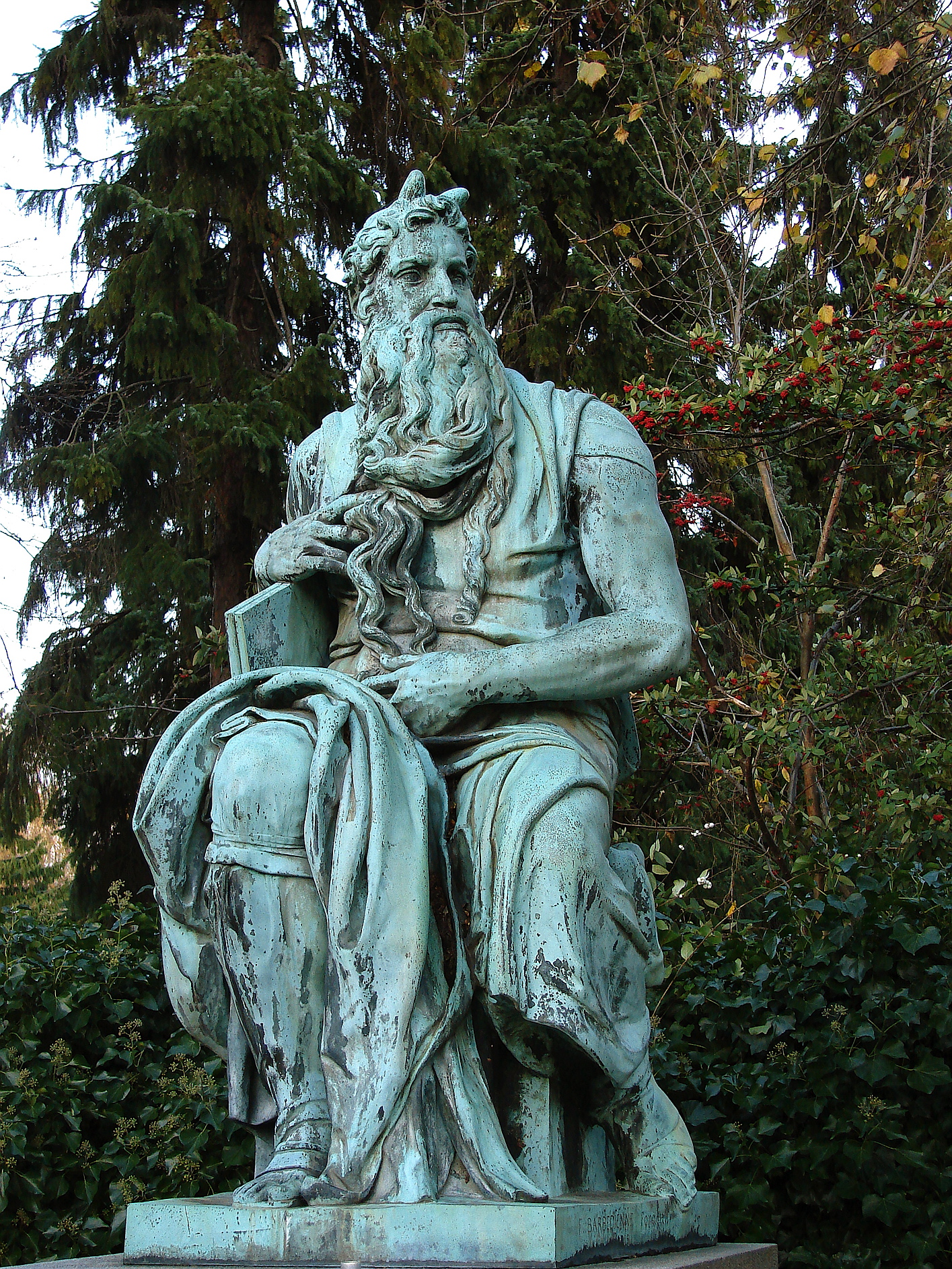
The Moses statue

The Artemis Fountain, from 1934, has a central location in the park. It was created by Johannes Bjerg and features a bronze sculpture of Artemis riding a jumping red deer stag.

A little further to the north west, next to the entrance to Assistens Cemetery, stands a bronze copy of Michelangelo's marble statue of Moses in San Pietro in Vincoli in Rome. The statue is owned by the Ny Carlsberg Glyptotek but placed in the park on loan in 1924.

== Future redevelopment ==
In 2016, a project for redesigning the park and Korsgade in a way that will protect the surrounding neighbourhood against flooding problems in connection with heavy rains was selected as the overall winner of the Nordic Council's Nordic Built Cities Challenge. The winning proposal, entitled "Soul of Nørrebro", was designed by SLA, Rambøll, ArkiLab, Den Nationale Platform for Gadeidræt, Aydin Soei and Social Action. The scheme will be realized in 2021-23.
