= Memorial to Nordic Volunteers and Fallen =

Monument in Copenhagen

Coordinates: 55°41′29″N 12°35′22″E

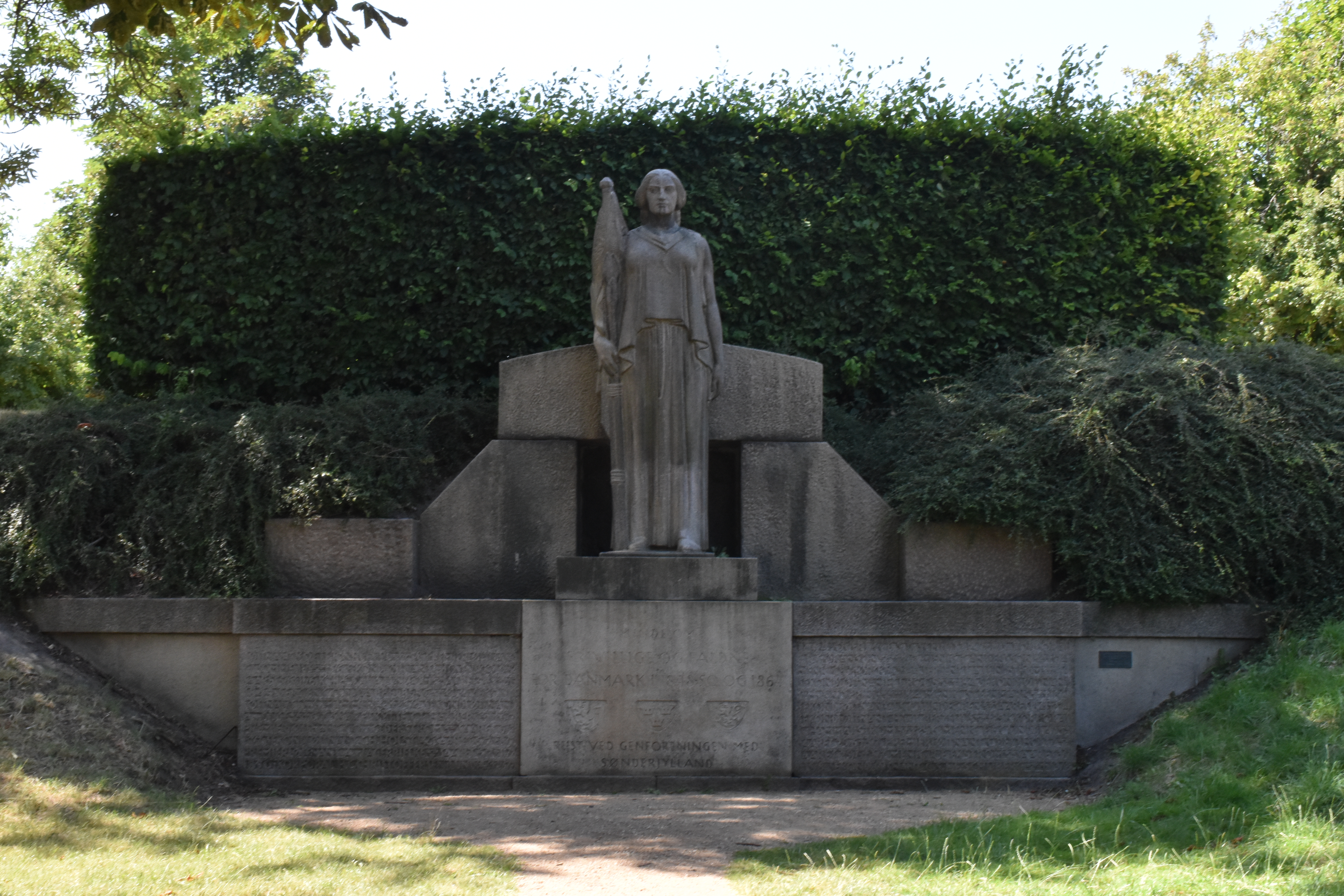
The memorial

The Memorial to Nordic Volunteers and Fallen (Danish: Mindesmærke for Frivillige og Faldne), located on Smedelinien, part of Kastellet, is a memorial to 28 Norwegian, Swedish and Finnish volunteers of the First (1848–50) and Second Schleswig War (1864). It was inaugurated in 1920 to design by Anders Bundgaard.

== Description ==
The memorial is designed as a symbolic burial chamber. At its entrance stands a female figure holding a standard and a spear. The plinth features the coats of arms of Norway, Sweden and Finland.

== History ==
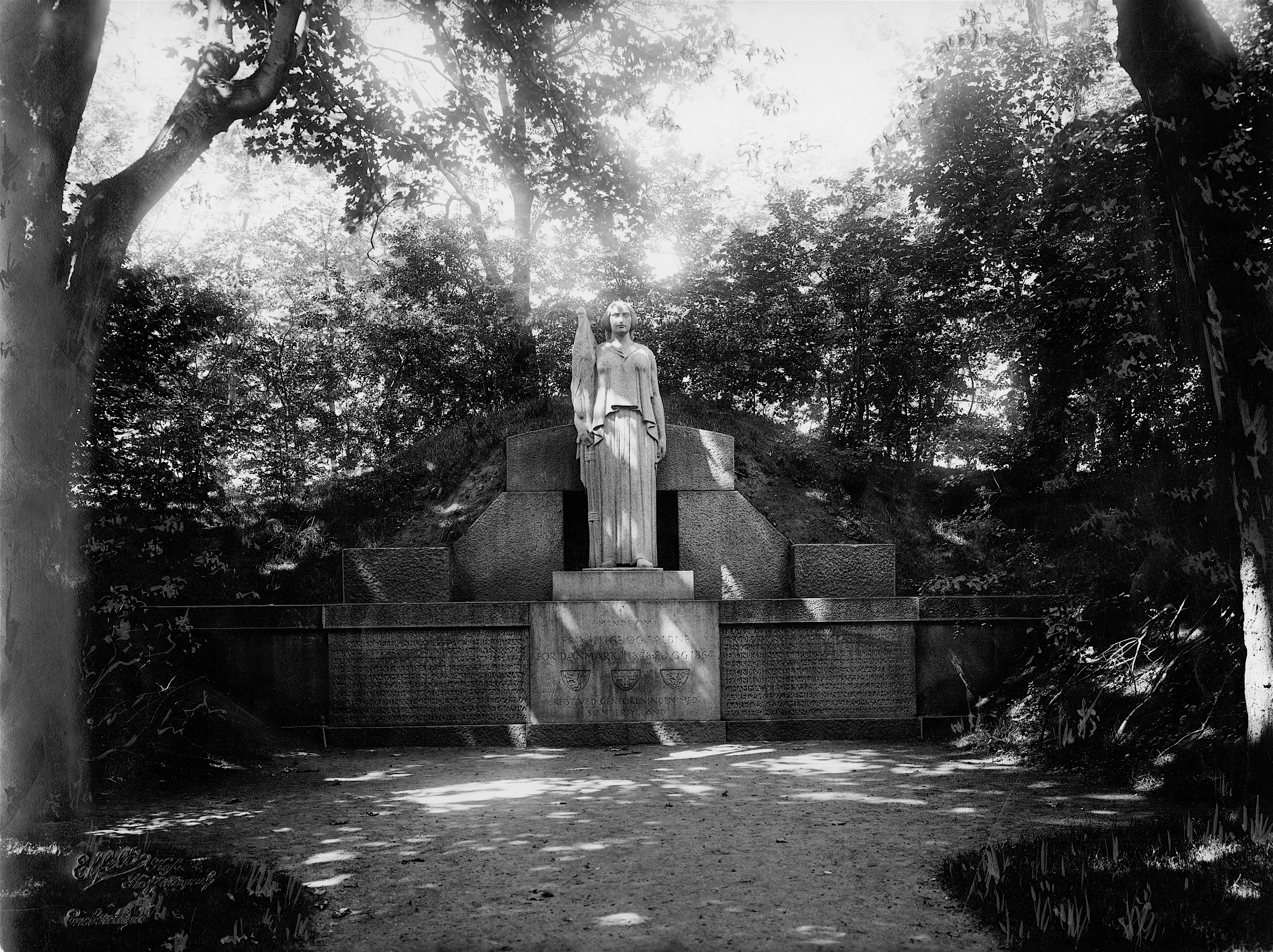
Vintage photo of the monument by Elfelt.

The memorial was created at the initiative of Danmarks-Samfundet through a nationwide fundraising campaign in connection with the reunion of Sønderjylland with Denmark. The society's application to the city was for a memorial on top of the former Pückler's Bastion in Østre Anlæg but that site was instead used for a new setting for the Denmark Monument. Anders Bundgaard was charged with designing the monument. It was unveiled in 1920.
