= Egon Fischer =

Danish sculptor (1935–2016)

Egon Fischer (23 October 1935 – 28 January 2016) was a Danish sculptor.

== Biography ==
Born in Copenhagen, Fischer studied at Eks-skolen where he learnt welding under Poul Gernes. The school's experimental approach provided significant impetus to his development. He began exhibiting in 1963, presenting his first welded pieces the following year with humorous titles such as "Besværlig tanke på sokkel" (Difficult Thoughts on a Plinth) or "Svævende port med hank og søjler" (Floating Gate with Handles and Columns). In 1967, he contributed Ølkasseskulptur (Beer Crate Sculpture) to an outdoor exhibition. Further experimentation in the 1970s resulted in a series of monumental works including his Skuptur-broen connecting Birkerød's town hall with its library. The huge work combined art and function, combining carved structural elements and coloured flowers.

Later commissions included the Hercules Column in Ordrup and the pyramidal Et glimt af fremtiden (A Glimpse of the Future) in Ballerup. Fischer's preferred materials are iron and weathering steel, often painted in bright colours.

Fischer died on 28 January 2016, at the age of 80.

== Awards ==
In 1975, Fischer was awarded the Eckersberg Medal and, in 1992, the Thorvaldsen Medal.
