= Polar Bear with Cubs =

Sculpture in Copenhagen, Denmark

- Isbjørn med inger (Danish)
- Artist: Holger Wederkinch
- Location: Copenhagen, Denmark; 55°40′34″N 12°34′06″E

Polar Bear With Cubs (Danish: Isbjørn med unger) is a sculpture situated at the southern end of the Langelinie Quay, just north of Langelinie Marina, in the Østerbro district of Copenhagen, Denmark.

== History ==
The sculpture was created by Holger Wederkinch in Paris. It was first exhibited at the Salon in 1929 where it won a gold medal. A bronze cast was in 1937 acquired by an anonymous buyer and gifted to Copenhagen's Port Authority. It was unveiled at the southern end of the Langelinie Quay in 1939. The bear was shot in the head by a German soldier during the Occupation of Denmark. He was sent back to Germany for the act.
