= Pistolstræde =

Passageway in Denmark

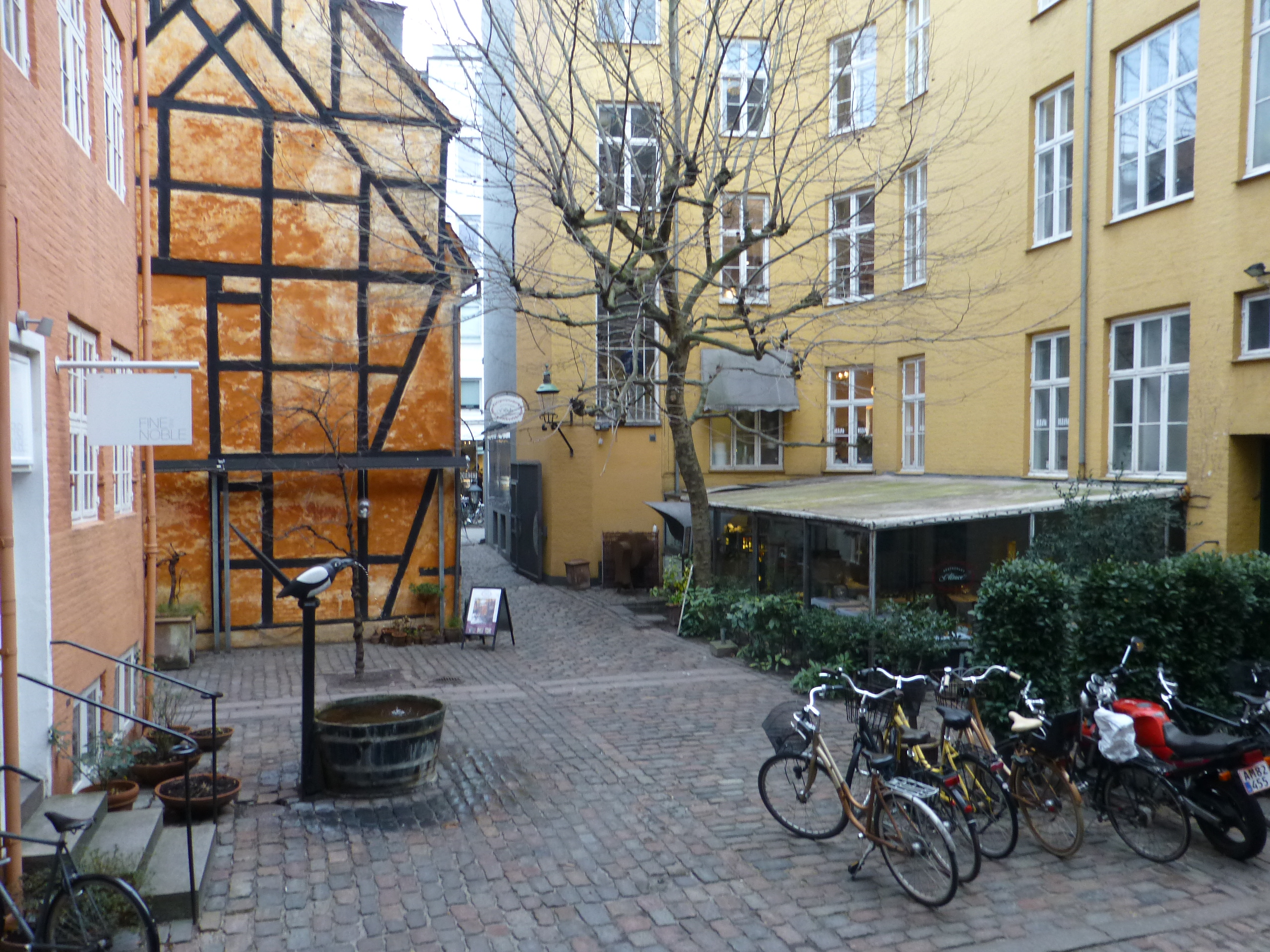
Pistolstræde with the Magpie Fountain

Pistolstræde is a passageway in the Old Town of Copenhagen, Denmark, linking the Østergade-section of the pedestrianized shopping street Strøget with Ny Østergade. It widens into a small plaza to the north and is entered through a gateway at each end. The name Pistolstræde (Pistol Alley) refers to its L-shape. its wider northern section being the "grip" of the pistol.

== History ==
Pistolstræde is the last of a number of similar alleys in the area. It was originally connected to another one, Peder Madsens Gang, which was replaced by Ny Østergade in 1873.

== Public art ==
The Magpie Fountain, created by Gunnar Westman, was installed at the small plaza in 1980. It features a stylized sculpture of a common magpie sitting on a pole. Its beak sprays water into a wooden cask.
