= Tove Ólafsson =

Danish sculptor (1909–1992)

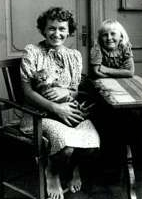
- Born: Tove Thomasen; October 5, 1909; Copenhagen, Denmark
- Died: December 5, 1992 (aged 83); Gentofte, Denmark
- Resting place: Ordrup Cemetery
- Awards: Eckersberg Medal, Tagea Brandt Rejselegat

Tove Ólafsson née Thomasen (1909–1992) was a Danish sculptor who is remembered for her publicly displayed works, especially those of children and women. She worked mainly with wood and stone but also with clay. Her bronze Hurtigløber (Fast Runner, 1982) stands outside Copenhagen's Brøndbyhallen. In 1948, Ólafsson was awarded the Eckersberg Medal.

== Biography ==
Born in Copenhagen on 5 October 1909, Tove Thomasen was the daughter of the manufacturer Rolf Clemen Thomasen (1877–1958) and Agnes Sophie Rossing. Although she had shown an interest in working with her hands from an early age, she was not trained as a sculptor until 1927 when she studied under Poul B. Olrik. In 1929, she spent a year in Florence with the Italian sculptor Aristide Aloisi. Thereafter, encouraged by her uncle, the translator Einar Thomassen, she studied under Einar Utzon-Frank at the Royal Danish Academy of Fine Arts from 1932 to 1935. She was also guided by her husband to be Sigurjón Ólafsson, the Icelandic sculptor whom she married in 1934.

Ólafsson first exhibited at the Charlottenborg autumn exhibition in 1934 but it was not until 1944 that she developed her interest in depictions of mother and child, initially exhibiting Mor og Barn, representing a mother breastfeeding her child. Her 1961 work with the same title which was displayed in Odense's Eventyrhaven depicts a mother teaching her child to walk.

In 1944, Ólafsson was the first woman and the first sculptor to become a member of the artist association Kammeraterne. She exhibited with the association almost every year until she died in 1992. Together with her husband, she settled in Iceland in 1945 where they lived under very primitive conditions. They returned to Copenhagen in 1953 but things became difficult for Tove, particularly after her divorce in 1955 when she was left to raise her two children in Nærum. After Copenhagen Municipality bought a figure from her in the late 1950s, her financial situation improved.

== Awards ==
Ólafsson received many awards, including the Eckersberg Medal in 1948, the Kai Nielsen memorial prize in 1959, and the Tagea Brandt travel scholarship in 1960.
