= Povl Søndergaard =

Danish sculptor (1905–1986)

Povl Goltermann Olsen Søndergaard, usually known as Povl Søndergaard, (4 June 1905 — 19 September 1986) was a Danish sculptor. He is remembered for his lifelike busts, his female figures and for monuments such as the Memorial to the Fallen in Bispebjerg Cemetery.

== Early life ==
The son of the painter Ole Søndergaard, Povl Søndergaard learnt stonemasonry in Roskilde (1920–24) before serving an apprenticeship with Svend Rathsack at the Maritime Monument on Copenhagen's Langelinie (1920–24). After attending the Technical School (1925–26), he studied sculpture under Einar Utzon-Frank at the Danish Academy (1927–33).

== Career ==
Sondergaard's early works are inspired by Kai Nielsen's lush approach, resulting in naturalistic figures and busts such as Pige, der sætter sit hår (Girl Setting her Hair, 1931) and Siddende pige (Seated Girl, 1933). Later he found a simpler, more natural idiom of his own. He preferred working with granite although several of his official works were crafted in bronze. These include his Mand og pige (Man and Girl, 1934) on Copenhagen's Genforeningspladsen, depicting two figures walking boldly into the future while looking lovingly at one another. Their attitudes and clothing are typical of the way young people were viewed in the 1930s. His Sportspige (Sports Girl, 1939) and Knud Rasmussen monument (1963) near Charlottenlund present a more robust and somewhat simpler approach with figures exuding calmness and restraint. The same can be said of the Mindesmærke for de faldne (Memorial to the Fallen, 1947) in Bispebjerg Cemetery and of Den sårede frihedskæmper (The Wounded Freedom Fighter, 1950) in Kolding, both in granite. His busts bear the same clarity and firmness, always highlighting the particular characteristics of the individuals concerned.

Søndergaard was also the driving force behind the Atelier Houses (Aterlierhusene) in Bispebjerg which provided simple, inexpensive accommodation for artists during the difficult years of the Second World War. Completed in 1943, the three rows of two-storey terraced houses near Utterslev Lake were specially designed to contain small studios with plenty of daylight.
