= Knud Nellemose =

Danish sculptor (1908–1997)

Knud Nellemose (12 March 1908, Copenhagen – 14 January 1997, Copenhagen) was a Danish sculptor who is remembered for his figures of sportsmen and his statues of famous Danes.

== Biography ==
Between 1927 and 1933, with some interruptions, Nellemose studied under Einer Utzon-Frank at the Danish Academy. After beginning his career as a sports journalist and newspaper illustrator, he turned to sculpture, concentrating on figures of boxers, footballers and athletes, often in motion. Initially influenced by Kai Nielsen, he soon developed a style of his own, creating figures showing the rhythmic movements of arms and legs. He travelled to Greece and Italy, where he was particularly impressed by Donatello. However, the lively representations he was able to create through the accentuated shaping of muscles and asymmetrical body positions, are entirely of his own making. Another imposing piece from before the war is his Avismanden Leitriz (1935), depicting a newspaperman dressed in the clothes he wore when selling newspapers in the streets of Copenhagen.

Highly productive in both stone and bronze, Nellemose created the Marble Church statues of Søren Kierkegaard (1972) and Bernhard Severin Ingemann (1988) as well as many groups of footballers. Among his many portraits, some focused on the face, others as half figures, are those of the archaeologist Peter Vilhelm Glob (1979) and the architect Steen Eiler Rasmussen (1988).

Under the German occupation during the Second World War, Nellemose was a member of the Frit Danmark resistance group. As a result, he received many commissions for war memorials including those for Silkeborg (1946) and for the 4th of May Dormitory in Aarhus (1953). His Erindring (Remembrance) from 1987 is a striking representation of a prisoner from a concentration camp.

From 1939, Nellemose exhibited as a member of the Decembrist artists and from 1946 at Den Frie Udstilling. His work was also part of the sculpture event in the art competition at the 1948 Summer Olympics.

Knud Nellemose's sister, Karin (1905–1993) was a well-known actress, figuring in many stage productions and films.

== Awards ==
- Nellemose received the Eckersberg Medal for Ung mand med diskos (Young Man with Discus) in 1944 and the Thorvaldsen Medal in 1968.

== Bibliography ==
- Knud Nellemose, Preben Wilmann, Thomas Winding, Pia Nellemose, Anders Nyborg: Knud Nellemose, Copenhagen, 1979, Anders Nyborg, 207 pp. ISBN 8785176117. (in Danish)
