= Ny Carlsberg Vej =

Street in Vesterbro, Copenhagen

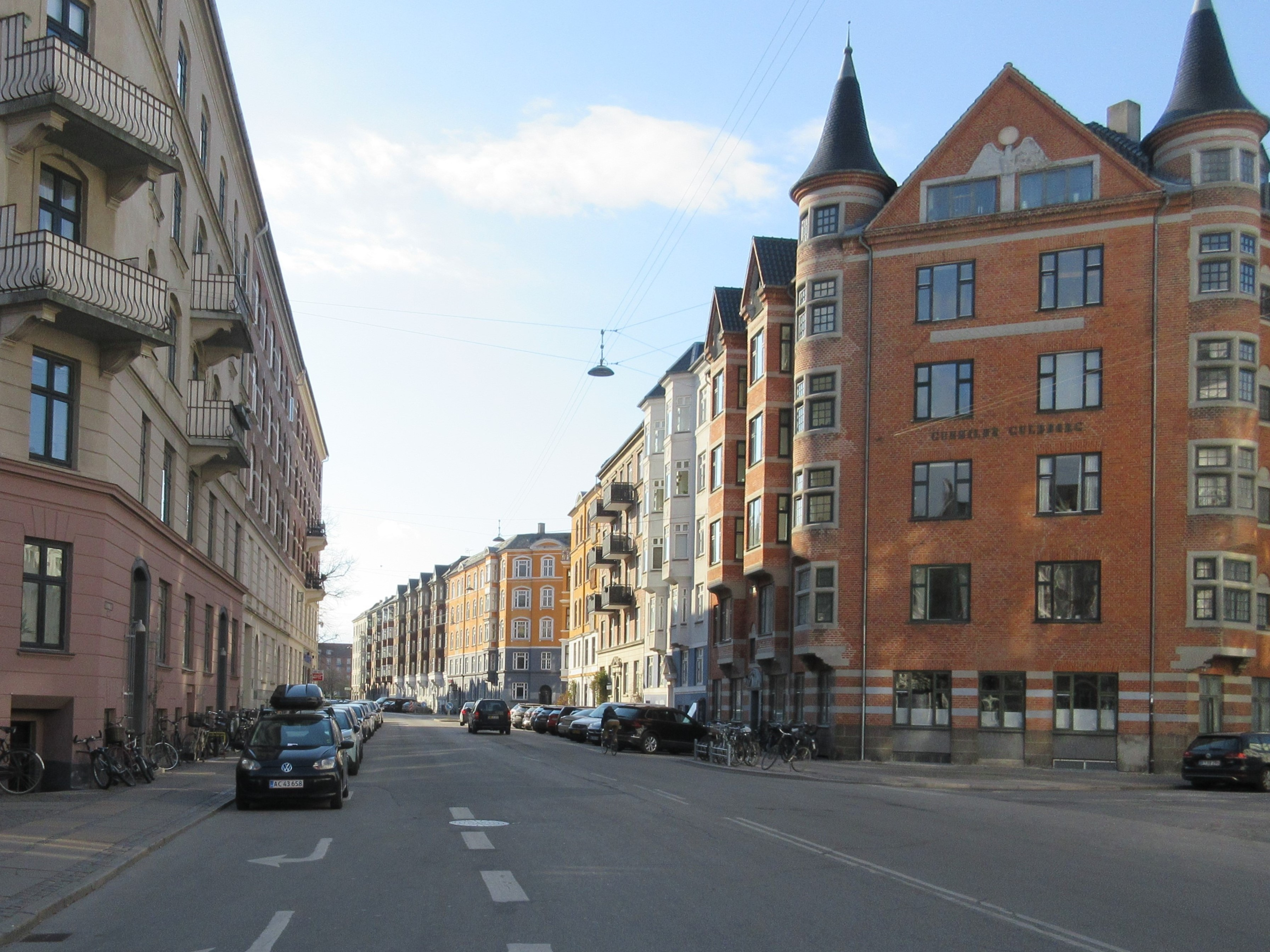
- Ny Carlsberg Vej seen from Sønder Boulevard
- Length: 1,180 m (3,870 ft)
- Location: Copenhagen, Denmark
- Quarter: Vesterbro
- Nearest metro station: Enghave Plads
- Coordinates: 55°40′0.3″N 12°32′12.66″E
- East end: Sønder Boulevard
- Major junctions: Enghavevej, Vesterfælledvej
- West end: Pile Allé-Valby Langgade

Ny Carlsberg Vej is a street in the Vesterbro district of Copenhagen, Denmark. It runs from Sønder Boulevard in the east to the point where Pile Allé turns into Valby Langgade at the southeastern corner of the park Søndermarken in the west. The last cobbled part of the street passes through the Carlsberg neighbourhood. This section of the street is spanned by the Dipylon Building and the Elephant Tower, both of which were designed by Vilhelm Dahlerup in the ornate Historicist style and are among the most iconic buildings of the former Carlsberg brewery site.

== History ==
=== Bakkegårdsvej ===
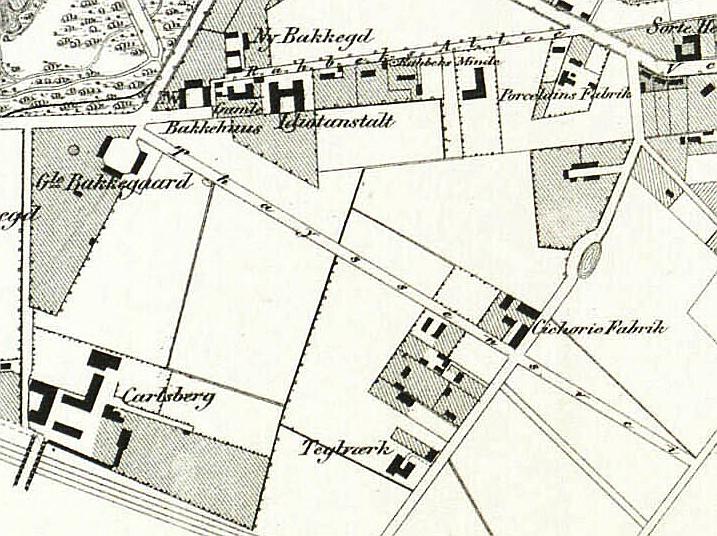
Bakkegårdsvej seen on a map detail from the 1870s: Famle Bakkegård, Carlsberg, Adolph's Chikory Factory and the brickyard are all shown on the map.

The road section from Enghavevej to Valby Langgade was created in around 1859 and was then known as Bakkegårdsvej. It was named for the property Bakkegården (The Hill Farm) at the western end of the street. The property had since the construction of Ny Bakkegård (New Hill Farm) on Rahbeks Allé also been known as Gamle Bakkegård (Old Hill Farm).

The new road passed through open farmland. One of the first buildings along the road was Adolphs Cikoriefabrik, a chickory factory, at the corner of Vesterfælledvej. A brickyard was located on the other side of the road.

Back in 1847, J. C. Jacobsen had established his Carlsberg Brewery on a site to the south of Bakkegården. In 1870 the brewery was extended with an annexed brewery, which was leased by J. C. Jacobsen's son Carl Jacobsen after disagreements with his father.

=== Industrial development, 1880 to 1900 ===
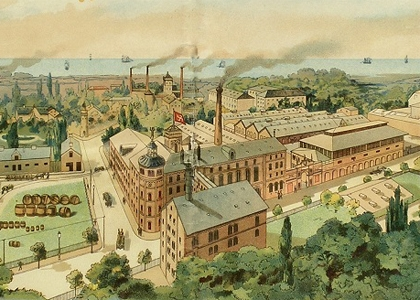
The Ny Carlsberg Brewery with Ny Carlsberg Vej in the foreground in 1890

In 1880 J. C. Jacobsen terminated his son's lease. Carl Jacobsen responded by purchasing Gamle Bakkegård and constructing his own brewery on part of the land. With his father's consent he named it Ny Carlsberg (New Carlsberg), while Carlsberg's name was changed to Gammel Carlsberg (English: Old Carlsberg). Carl Jacobsen resided at Fanke Bakkegård for a few years but then replaced it with a new house. In 1883, Bakkegårdsvej was renamed Ny Carlsberg Vej after his brewery.

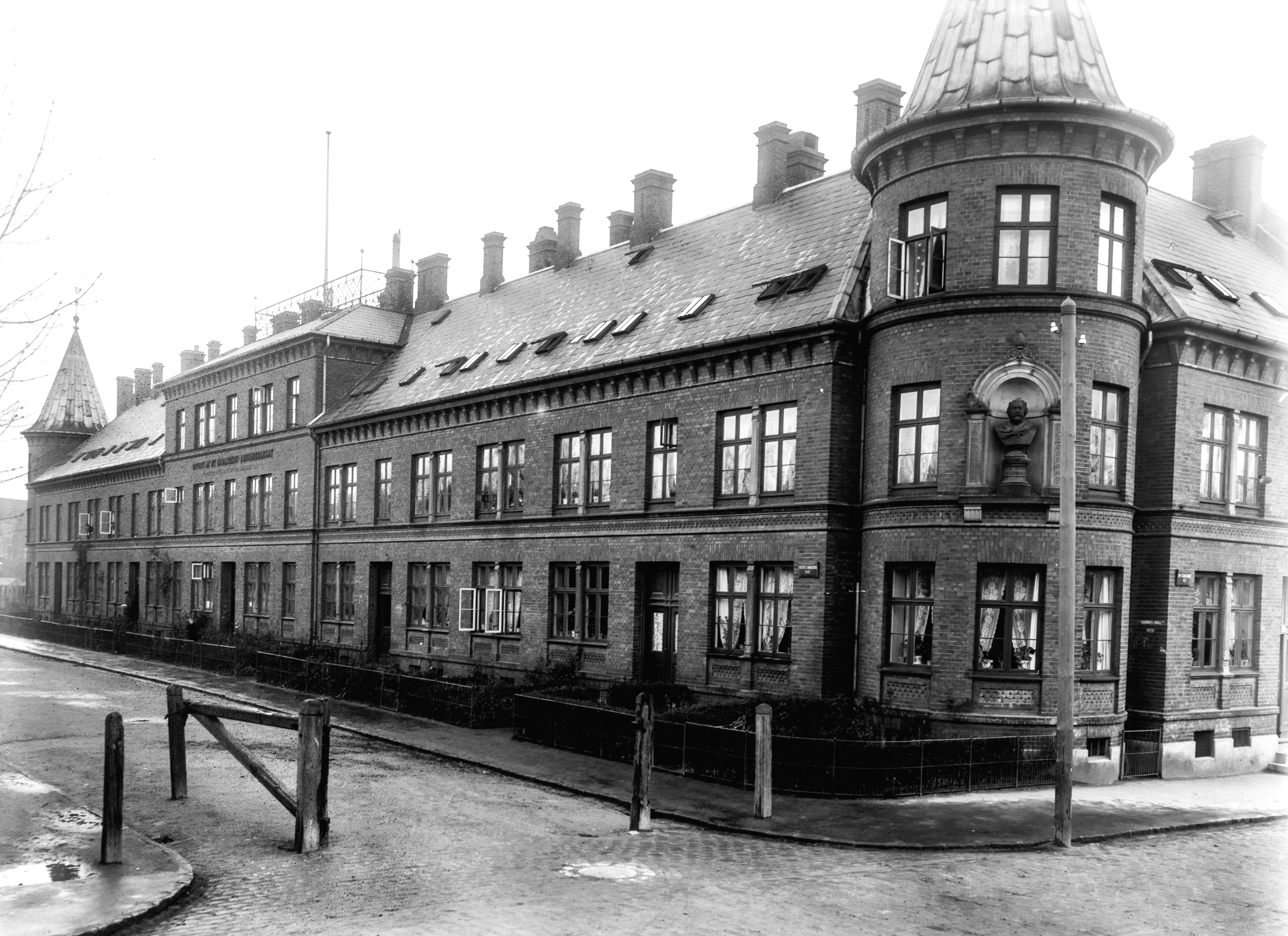
The no longer existing side street Theophilus Hansens Gade with workers' housing, photographed by Frederik Riise

The Ny Carlsberg Brewery buildings were designed with the assistance of some of the leading architects of the time, including Vilhelm Dahlerup. A housing development for workers at the brewery was also constructed along the no longer existing street Theofilus Hansens Gade. It was built in 1887–88 to designs by Christian Laurits Thuren but demolished in 1962.

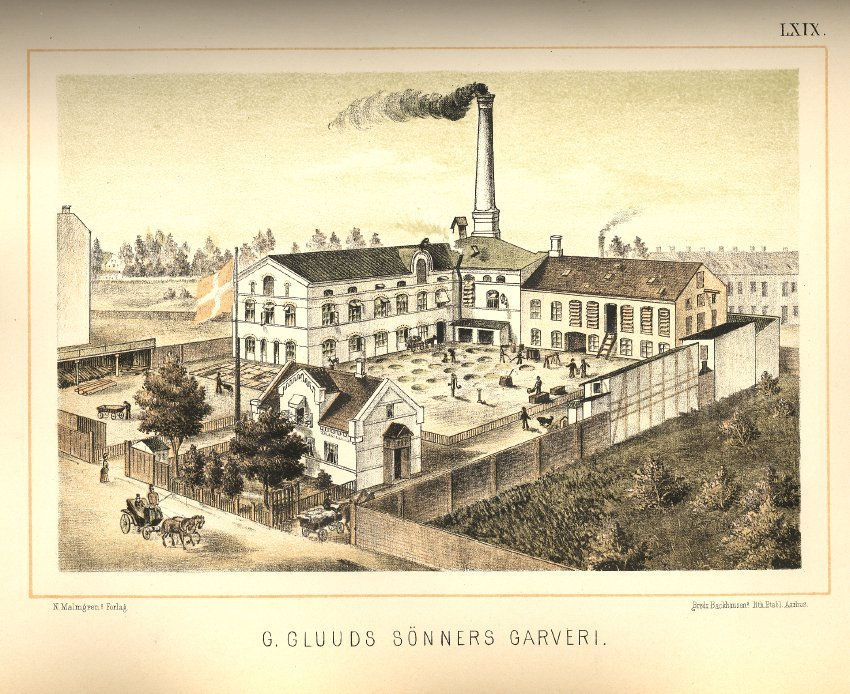
G. Gluud's Tannery, 1888

In 1880, Eduard Gluud moved his tannery from Blegdamsvej to Ny Carlsberg Vej (No. 14, later No. 78). It operated a shop with leatherware at Store Kongensgade 32. The company F. Gluud's Sønner closed in 1911.

In 1887, Camilla Nielsen acquired a dilapidated property on Ny Carlsberg Vej which she adapted to house 75 small apartments for needy families with children.

=== 20th and 21st centuries ===
In approximately 1900, Ny Carlsberg Vej was extended eastwards to Sønder Boulevard. The street section from Enghavevej to Vesterfælledvej was in the 1910s and 1920s redeveloped by the city, both with the creation of Enghave Park and a number of new housing estates. The far end of the street was still dominated by the ever expanding Carlsberg Brewery.

In October 2008, the brewery site was finally decommissioned when production moved to Fredericia. A masterplan for redevelopment of the area into a new urban neighbourhood was subsequently adopted. Redevelopment of the area was still ongoing as of December 2020.

== Notable buildings ==
=== Sønder Boulevard to Vesterfælledvej ===
Ny Vesterbro Skole (No. 35) is a public primary school created in 2004 through the merger of Ny Carlsbergvejens Skole and Alsgade Skole. Ny Carlsbergvejens Skole opened in 1913.

A/B Enghaven, which occupies the entire block between Vesterfælledvej and Enghaveparken, was built by the city in 1927. The block on the other side of Ny Carlsberg Vej (No. 37) is from 1917 and was designed by Christian Mandrup-Poulsen.

=== Vester Fælledvej to Pile Allé ===
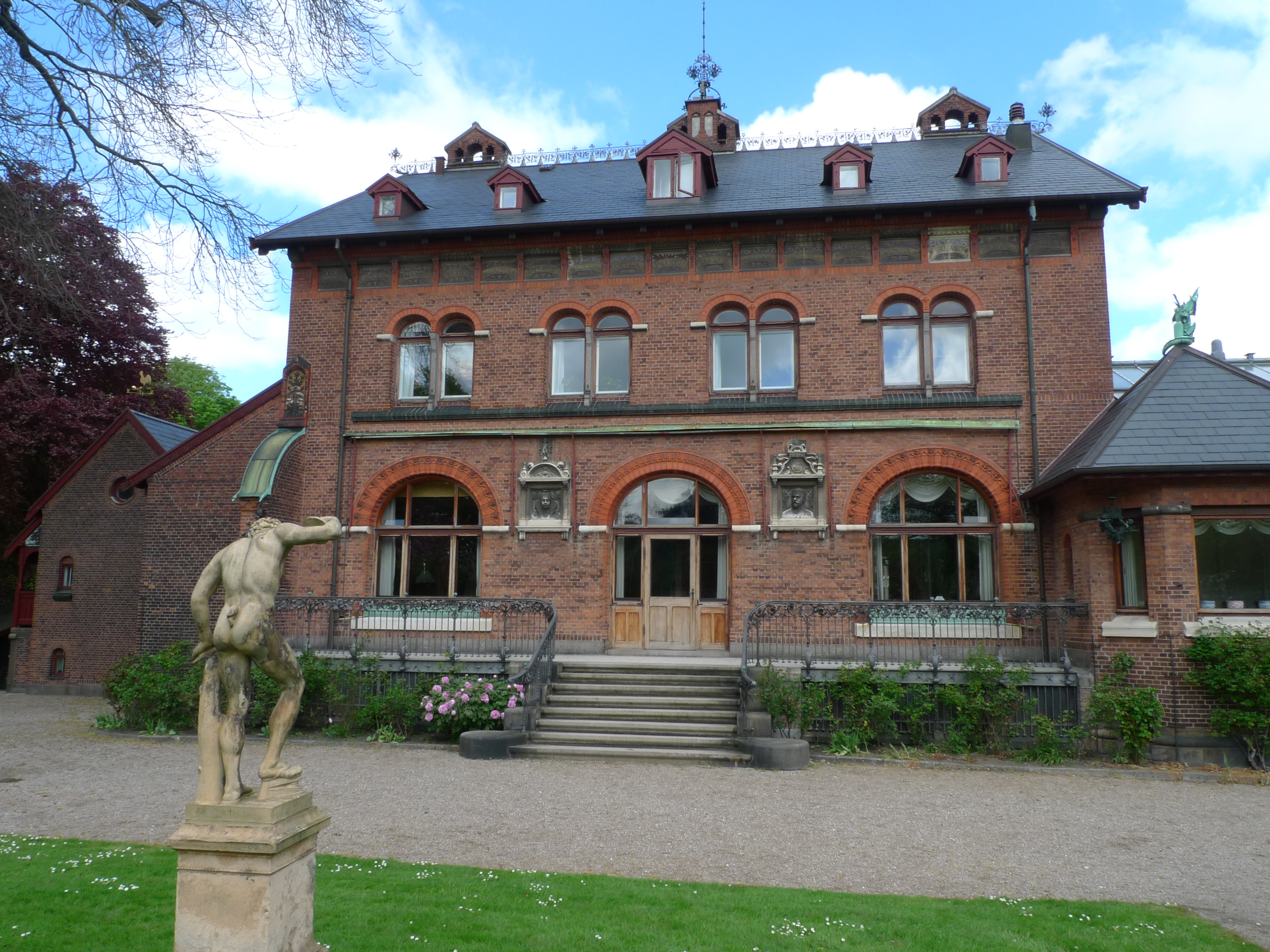
The Carl Jacobsen House

The Carl Jacobsen House was completed in 1892 to designs by Hack Kampmann. The adjacent Carlsberg Museum (No. 105) was built for his private art collection which was later moved to the Ny Carlsberg Glyptotek. The small round guardhouse at the corner with Valby Langgade, which guarded the entrance both to Jacobsen's villa and the brewery, is from 1905 and was also designed by Hack Kampmann. It is known as the Yeast Tower since it was possible for private customers to buy surplus fresh yeast from the guard.

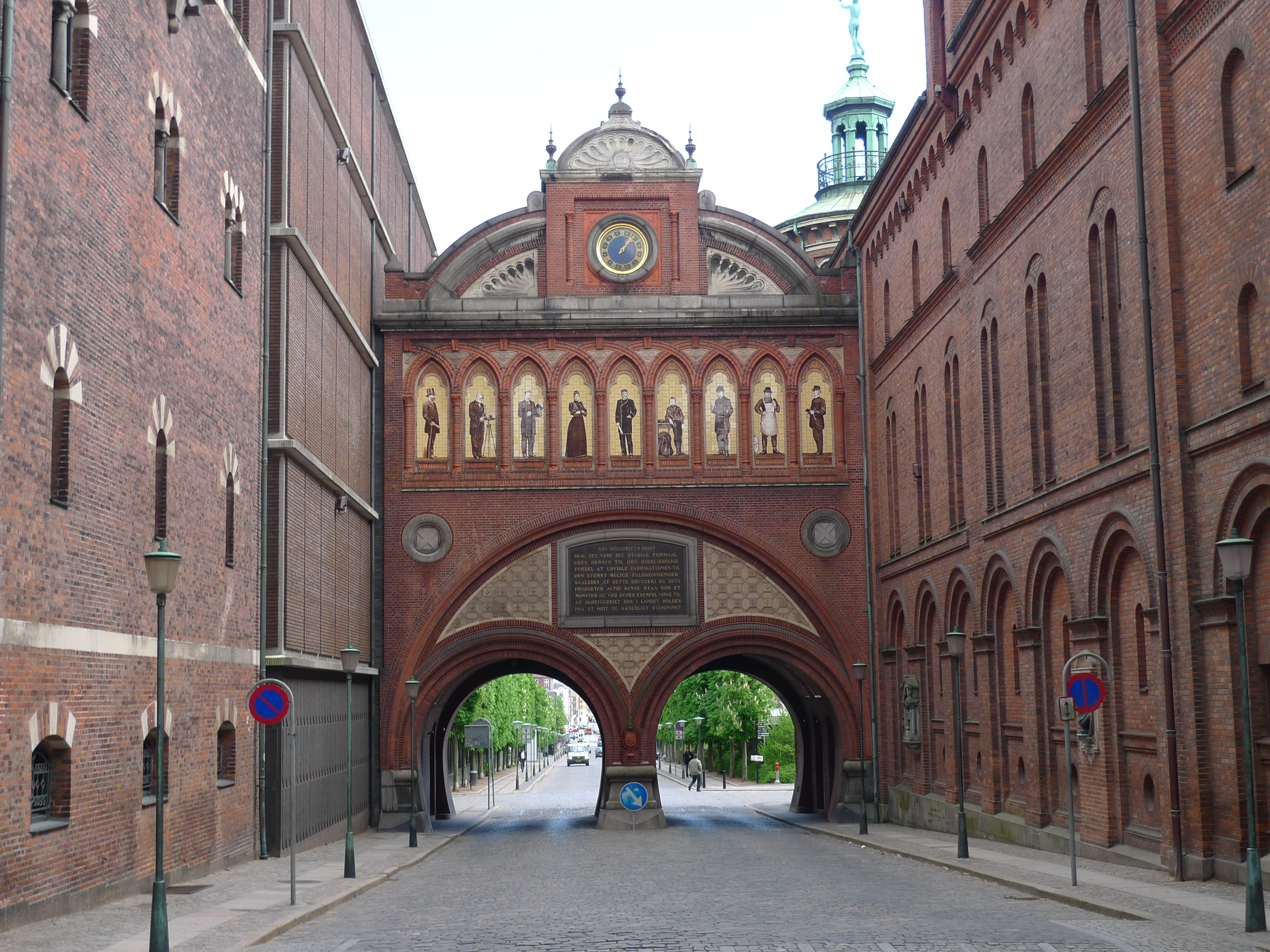
Dipylon Building

The Grey House on the other side of the street is a former villa constructed by Laurits Albert Winstrup in 1875. It was acquired by Carl Jacobsen in 1882 and used as the administration building of his new brewery. In 1901 it was expanded with a new north wing to designs by Hack Kampmann.

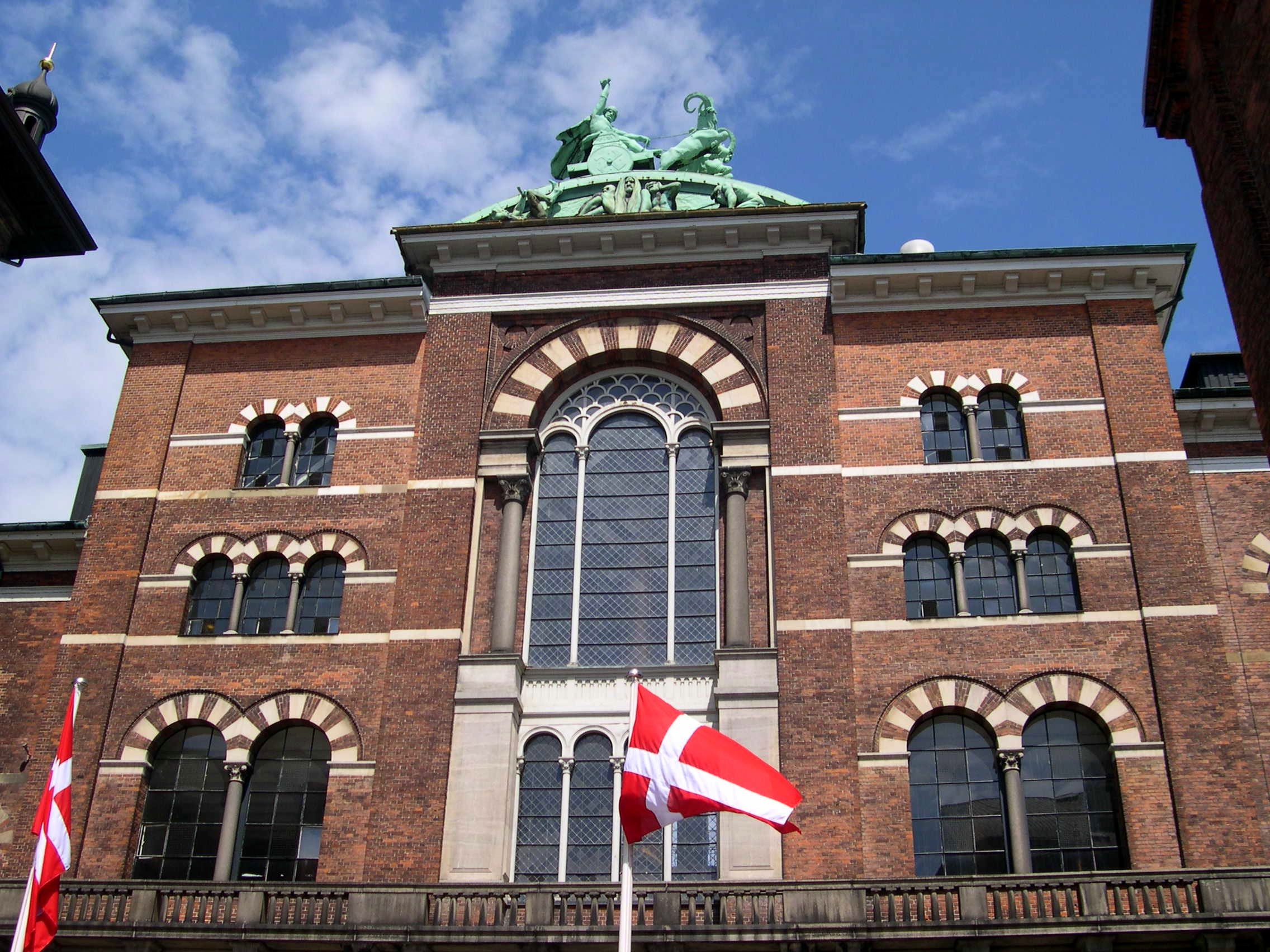
Ny Carlsberg Brewhouse

The Ny Carlsberg Complex was built in stages in the ornate Historicist style with the assistance of changing architects. Hotel Ottilia, located on the south side of the street, occupies a former maltery. Ny Carlsberg Brewhouse is from 1891 and was designed by Wilhelm Klein. The two buildings are at their eastern end connected across the street by the Dipylon Building, built in 1892 to a richly decorated design by Vilhelm Dahlerup. The nine years younger Elephant Tower, which spans the street at the western end of the complex, is carried by four life-size granite elephants.

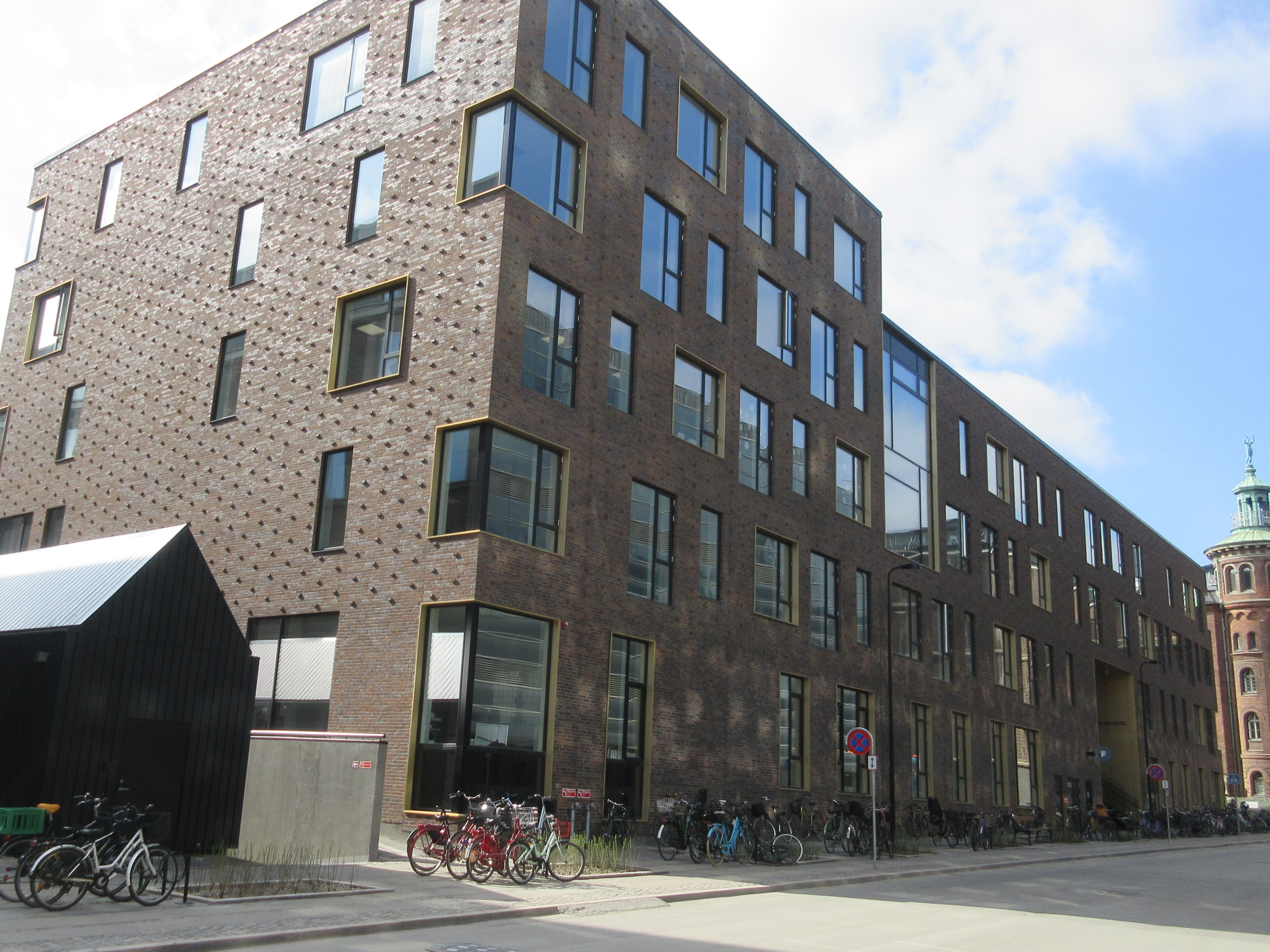
No. 99: The European School

Humleby (lit. "Hops Town") is an enclave of terraced houses built between 1885 and 1891 by the Worker's Building Society to provide healthy housing for the workers at Burmeister & Wain.

The European School Copenhagen (No. 99), which was inaugurated in November 2018, is an Accredited European School. The building was designed by Vilhelm Lauritzen Arkitekter in collaboration with Nord Arkitekter.

== Public art ==
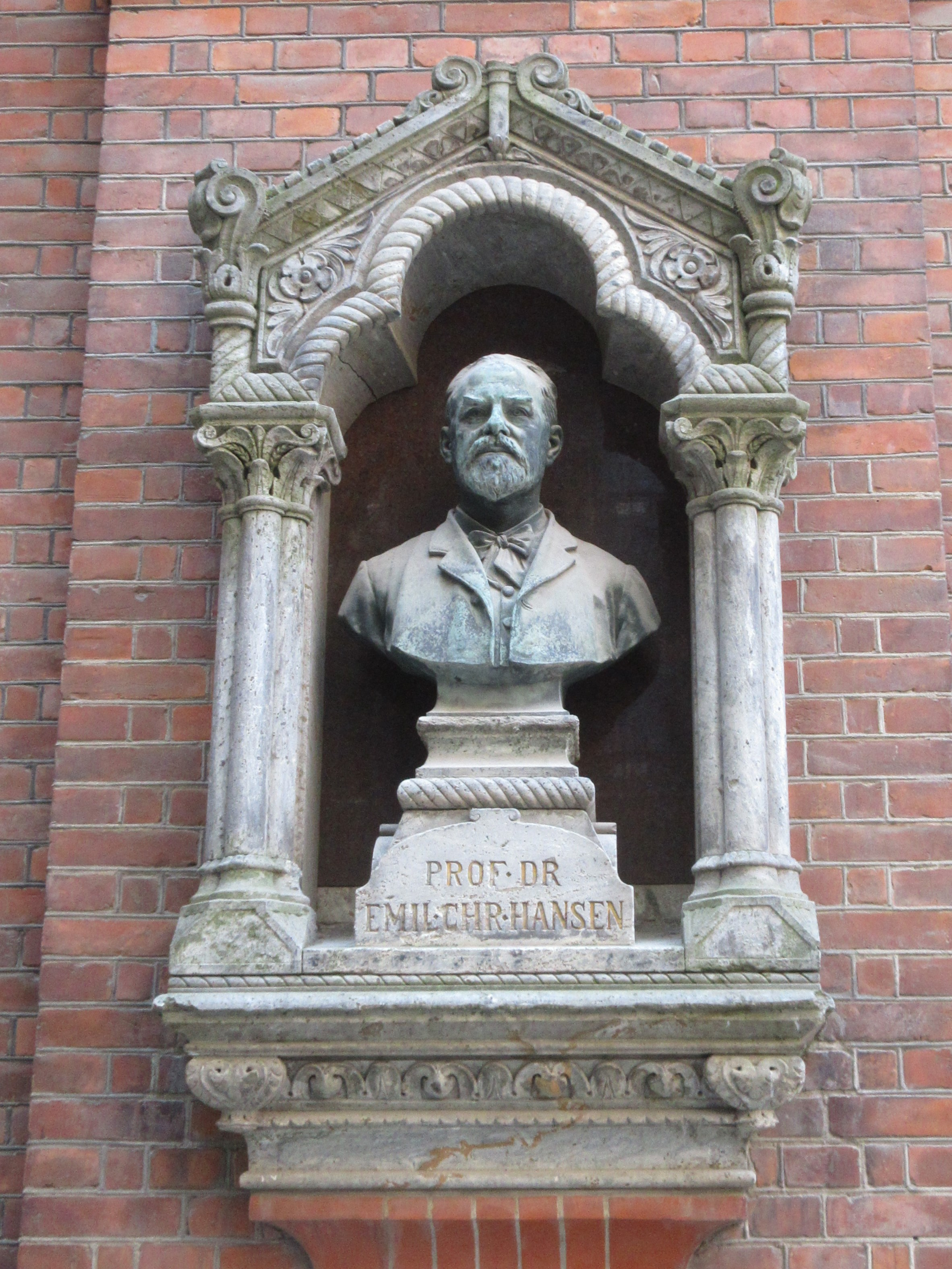
Bust of Emil Christian Hansen

The ground floor of Hotel Ottilia features a number of busts embedded in the facade. They commemorate Louis Pasteur (1884, Paul Dubois), Gabriel Sedlmayr (1900, Alexis Møller) and Emil Christian Hansen (Nicolai Outzen Schmidt). The corner tower of the building is topped by a copy of the Ancient Greek statue Praying Boy (original in Altes Museum).

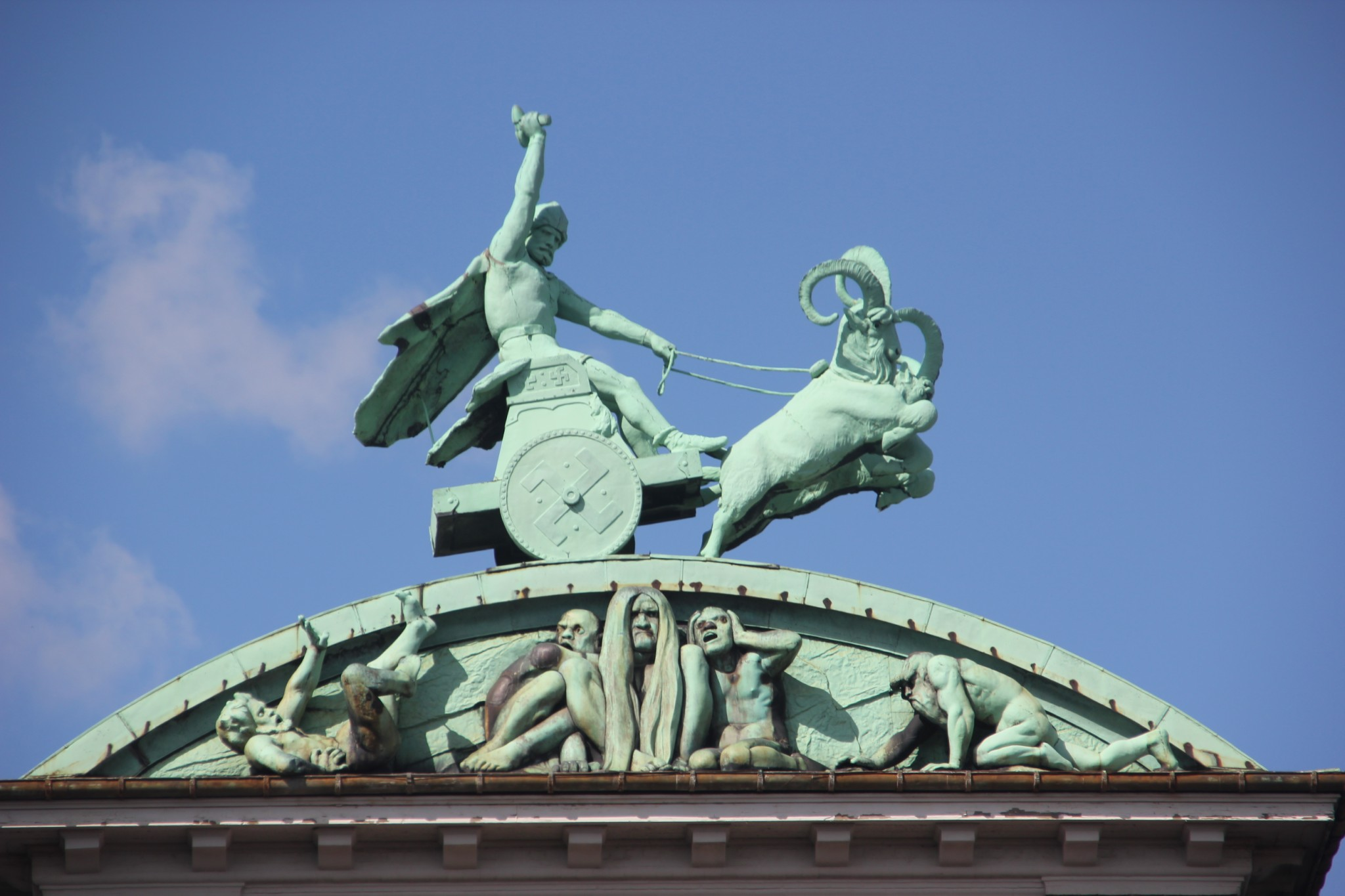
Thor sculpture topping the Ny Carlsberg Brewhouse

The two Bell-Strikers which top the Dipylon Building were created by Stefan Sinding. The four granite elephants of the Elephant Tower were created by the sculptor Hans Peder Pedersen-Dan. One of the arches of the loggia above the elephant features a double bust of Ottilia and Carl Jacobsen by Ludvig Brandstrup.

The Ny Carlsberg Brewhouse is topped by a Thor sculpture by Carl Bonnesen.

== Transport ==
The Enghave Plads City Circle Line metro station is located at the eastern end of the street. Carlsberg station is located close to the western end of the street.

== Gallery ==
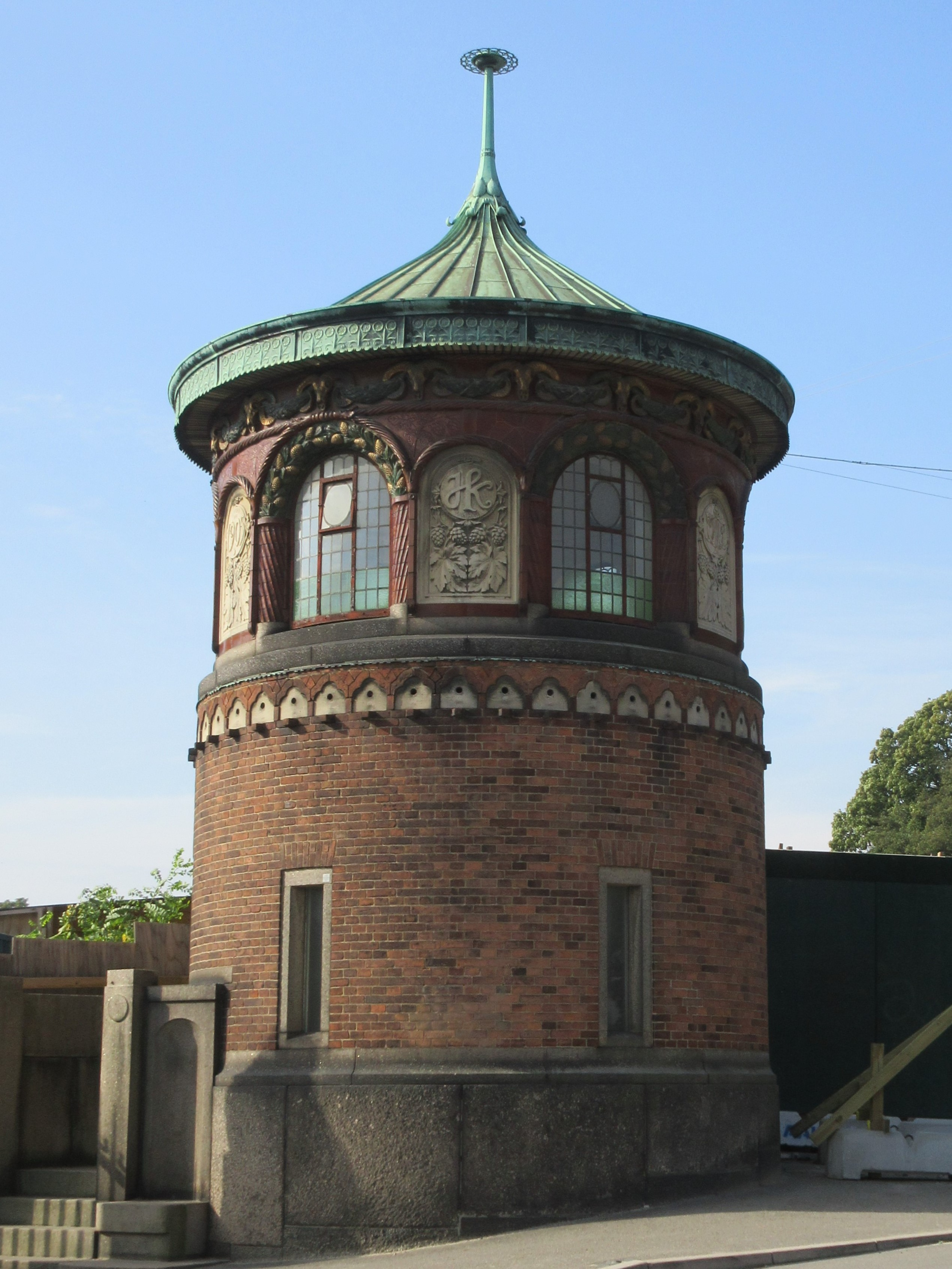
The Yeast Tower, former guardhouse

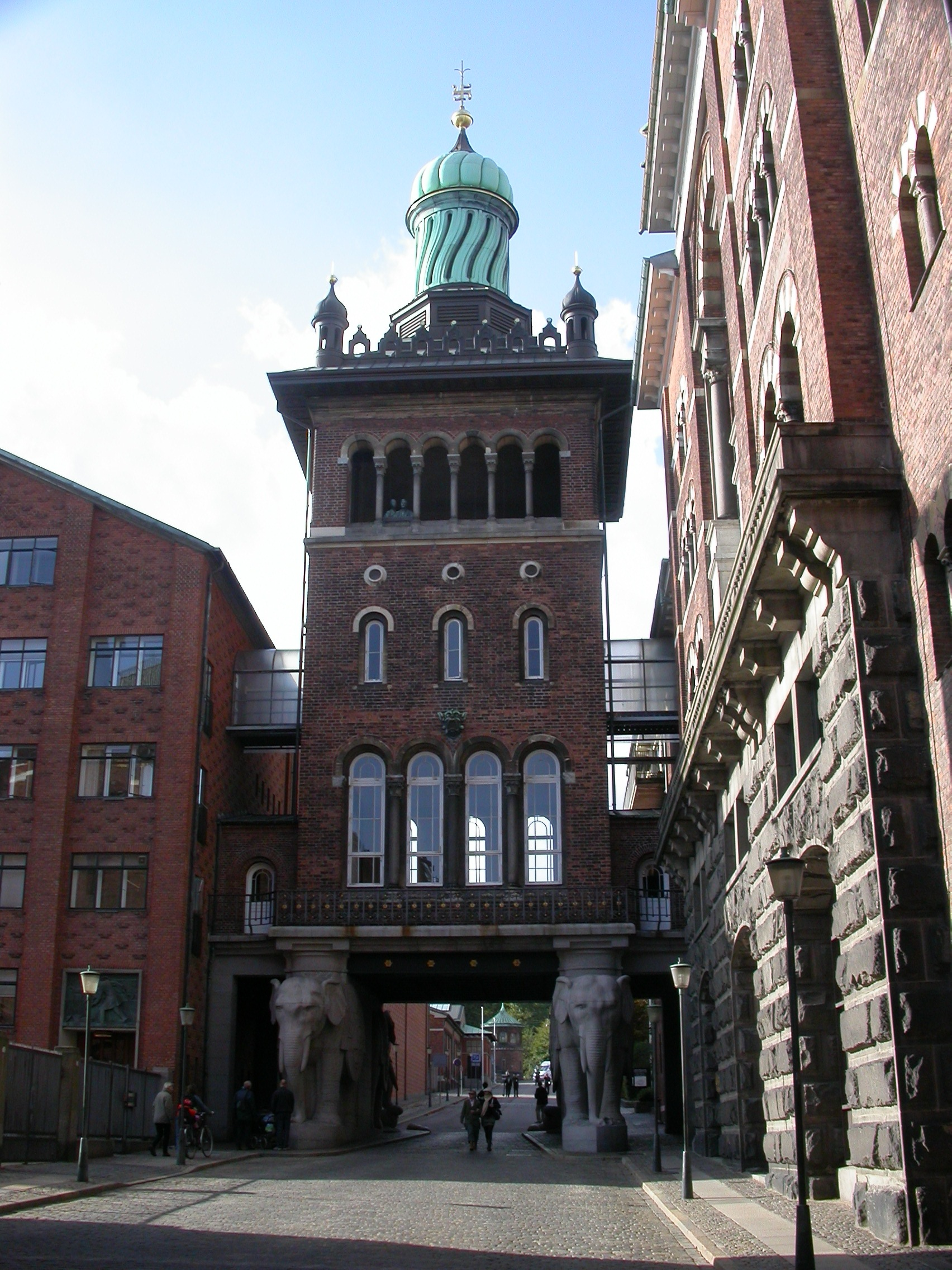
The Elephant Tower

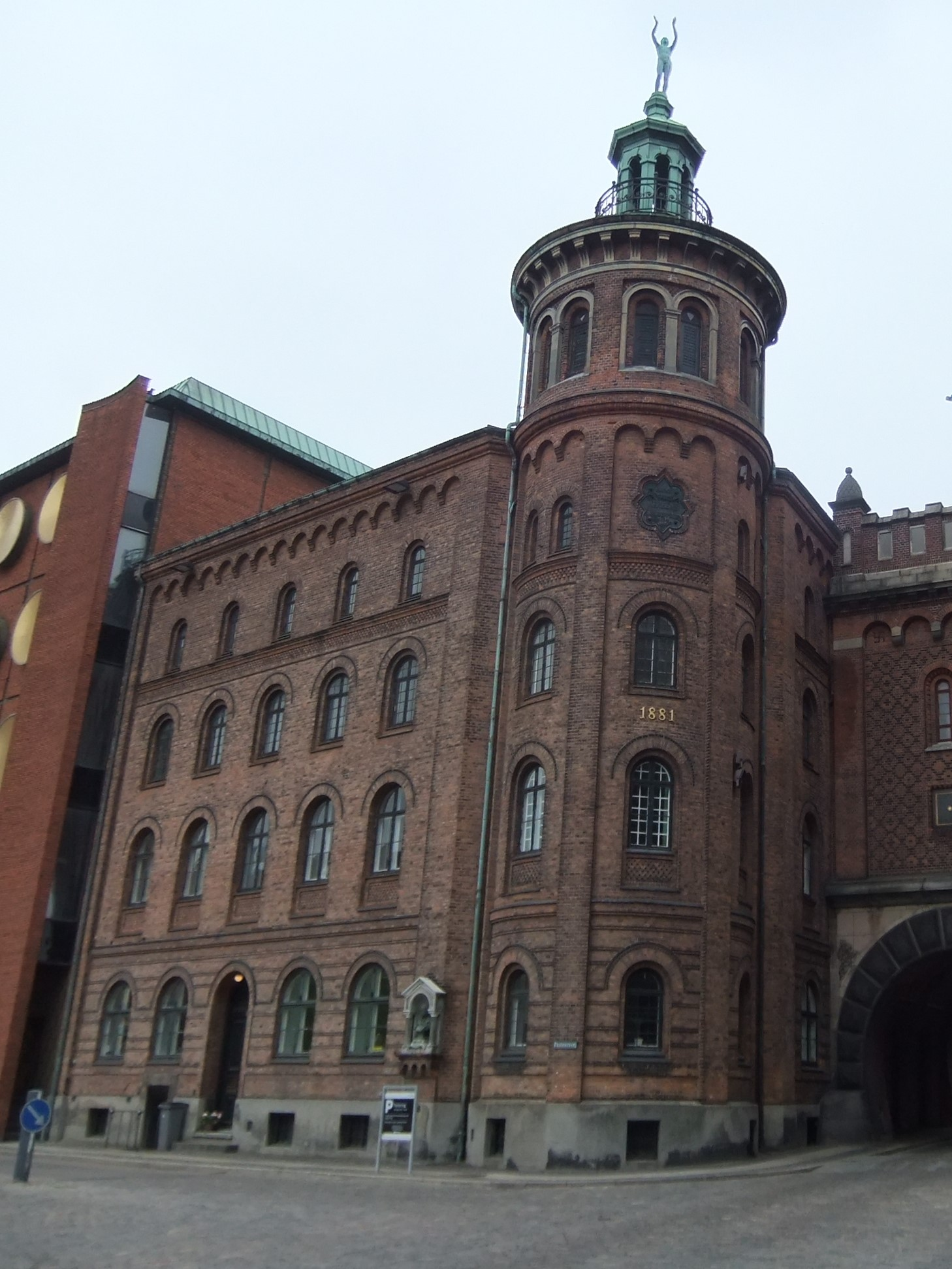
Hotel Ottilia
