= Titan A/S =

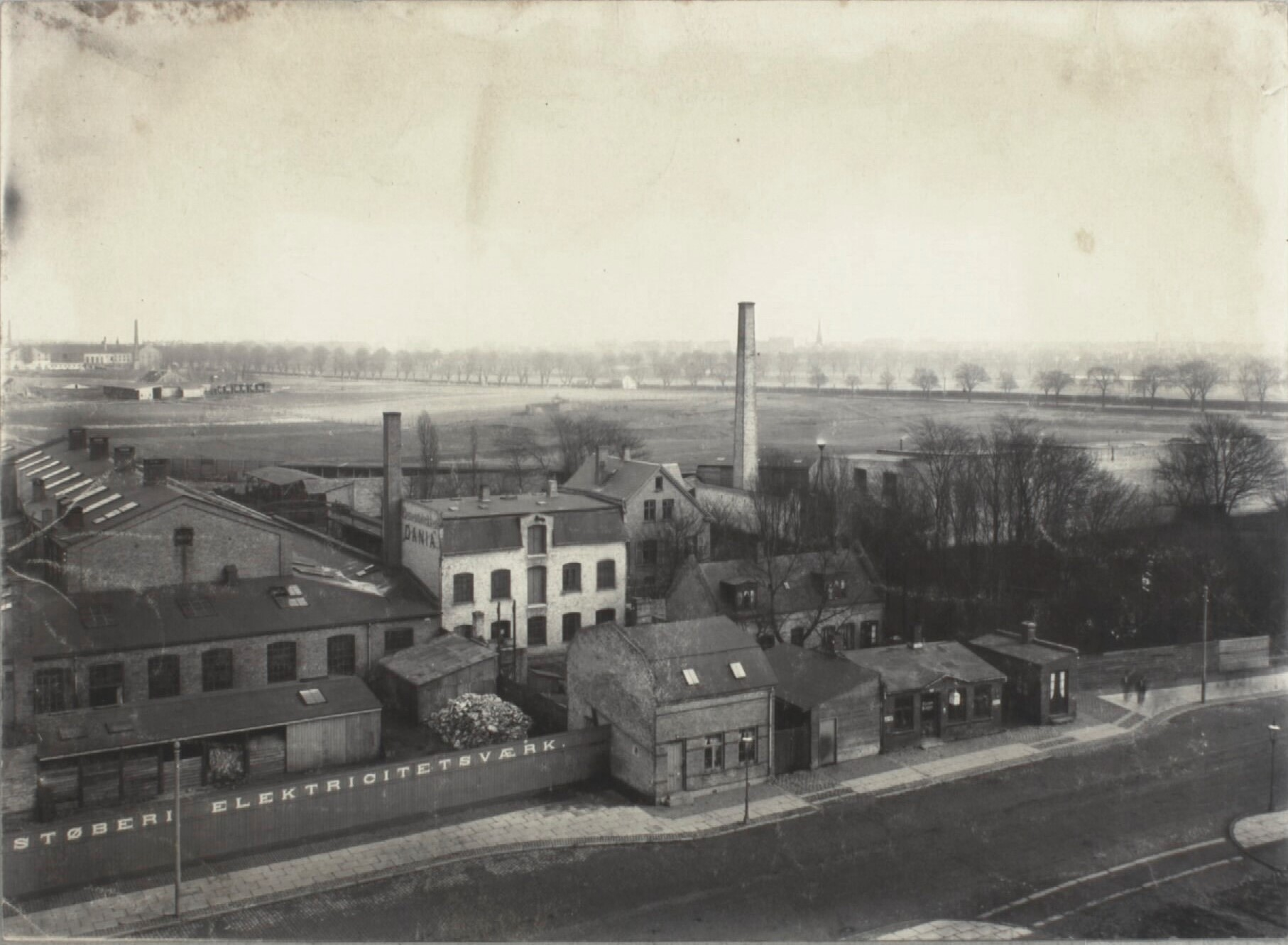
Titan in c. 1900

Titan A/S was a Danish machine factory and iron foundry founded by merger of two older companies in 1897 and based at Tagensvej 86 in the Nørrebro district of Copenhagen, Denmark. It occupied the entire site between the streets Tagensvej, Hermodsgade, Titangade, Sigurdsgade and Rådmandsgade. It merged with Odense-based Thriege in 1965 under the name Thriege-Titan. The merged company is now called T-T Electric and is headquartered in France.

== History ==
=== Koefoed & Hauberg ===
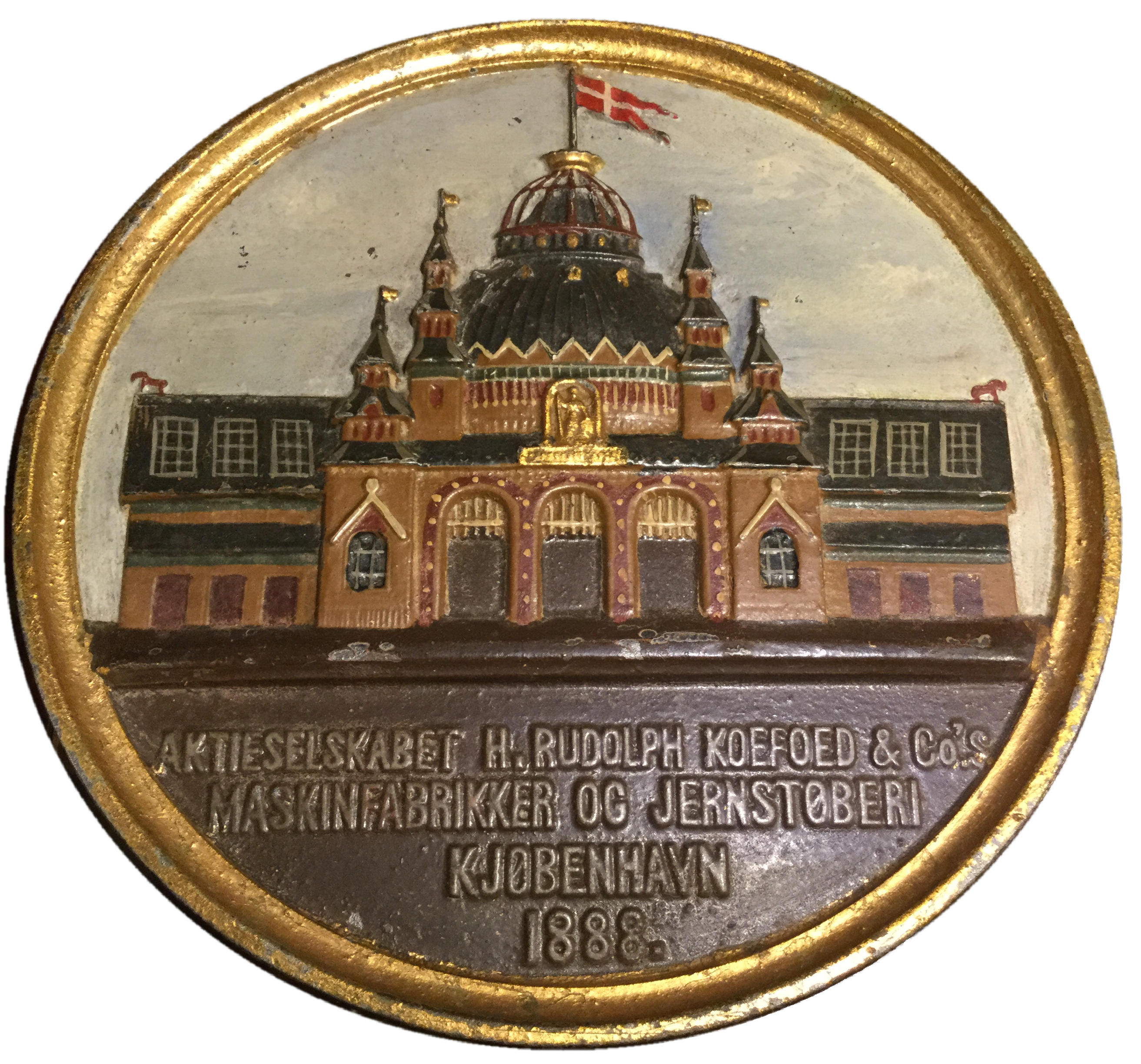
Cast iron advertisement sign from Rudolph Kofoed's Machine Factory

H. Rudolph Koefoed (1828-1915) established a machine factory in 1856 which was converted into a limited company (aktieselskab) in 1883. The company was in 1888 merged with S.C. Haubergs Maskinfabrik, a machine factory started on Tagensvej by Sophus Christoper Hauberg in 1885, under the name A/S Koefoed & Hauberg. Both factory sites were continued with Hauberg as the managing director.

=== Marstrand, Helweg & Co. ===
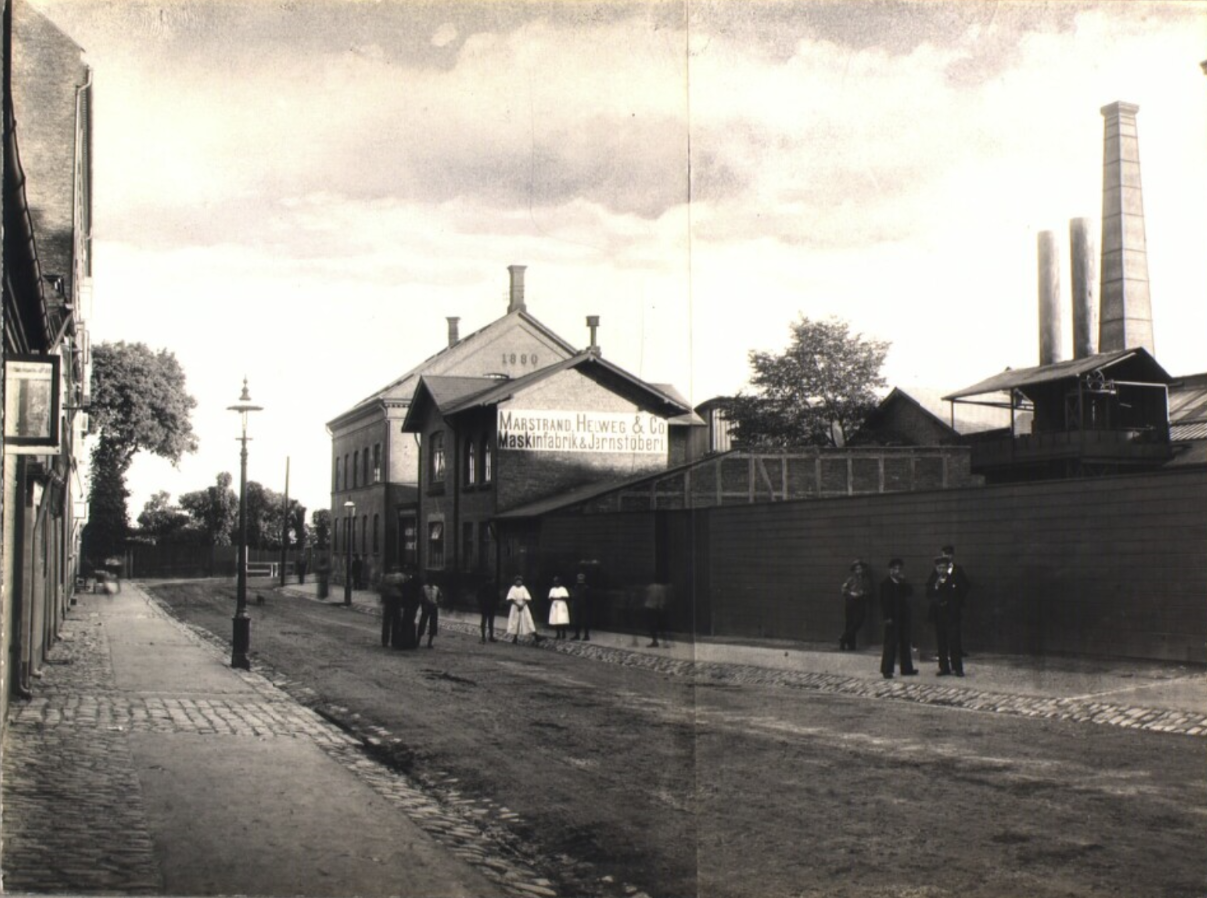
Marstrand & Helweg at Vesterfælledvej 32

Poul Marstrand (1851-1902) established another machine factory in 1875. It was in 1880 merged with a company founded by Regner Helweg (1861-1932) under the name Marstrand, Helweg & Co. The company was located at Vesterfælledvej 32. It developed into a leading manufacturer of lifts and electric cranes. It attracted media attention for producing the lift for the Tuborg Bottle at the 1888 Nordic Exhibition in Copenhagen and again in 1894 when it delivered electrical lifts for Magasin du Nord's building on Kongens Nytorv. The electric motors for the lifts were initially imported but from the late 1890s on the company was able to produce them at its own factory.

=== Titan A/S ===
In 1897, Hauberg instigated the merger of Koefoed & Hauberg and Marstrand, Helweg & Co.under the name Koefoed, Hauberg, Marstrand & Helweg, Aktieselskabet Titan. The company was one of the largest of its kind in Denmark, its only rival being Thrige in Odense. Titan's customers included Burmeister & Wain as well as the College of Advanced Technology in Copenhagen and it was also the leading supplier of cranes and hoists for Danish ports.

The factory on Tagensvej was destroyed by fire in 1800 but soon thereafter rebuilt. The factory on Tagensvej was decommissioned when the company merged with Thrige under the name Thrige-Titan in 1965. The company is now called TT Electric.

== See also ==
- Marstrand, Helweg & Co.
