= Tredje Natur =

Practice information
- Key architects: Malene Krüger, Flemming Rafn Thomsen and Ole Schrøder
- Founded: 2012
- Location: Copenhagen, Denmark

Tredje Natur (literally "Third Nature") is a Copenhagen-based architectural firm specializing in urban design and planning. It was founded by Flemming Rafn Thomsen and Ole Schrøder in 2012. Malene Krüger joined the firm in January 2015.

== Selected works ==
- St. Kjeld's Quarter, Copenhagen, Denmark (completion win 2012)
- Vinge masterplan, Frederikssund, Denmark (competition win, October 2014)
- Enghaveparken, Copenhagen, Denmark (competition win, January 2015)
- South Camp redevelopment, Værløse Air Base (with COBE Architects), Værløse, Denmark (competition win, January 2015)
- Faste Batteri (with Arkitema), Copenhagen, Denmark (competition win, March 2015)
- Sølund (with C. F. Møller Architects), Copenhagen, Denmark (competition win, March 2016)
