= Vesterfælledvej =

Street in Copenhagen Municipality, Denmark

- Length: 822 m (2,697 ft)
- Location: Copenhagen, Denmark
- Quarter: Vesterbro
- Nearest metro station: Carlsberg
- Coordinates: 55°40′0.45″N 12°32′21.73″E
- North end: Vesterbrogade
- Major junctions: Ny Carlsberg Vej
- South end: Vigerslev Allé

Vesterfælledvej (lit. "Western Common Road") is a street in the Vesterbro district of Copenhagen, Denmark. The street runs from Vesterbrogade at Sorte Hest in the north to Vigerslev Allé in the south. The Carlsberg and Humleby neighbourhoods are located on the west side of the street.

The Vigerslev Bridge carries the southern part of the street across the West Line and the Gøje Tåstrup radial of the S-train network.

== History ==
=== Copenhagen's western common ===
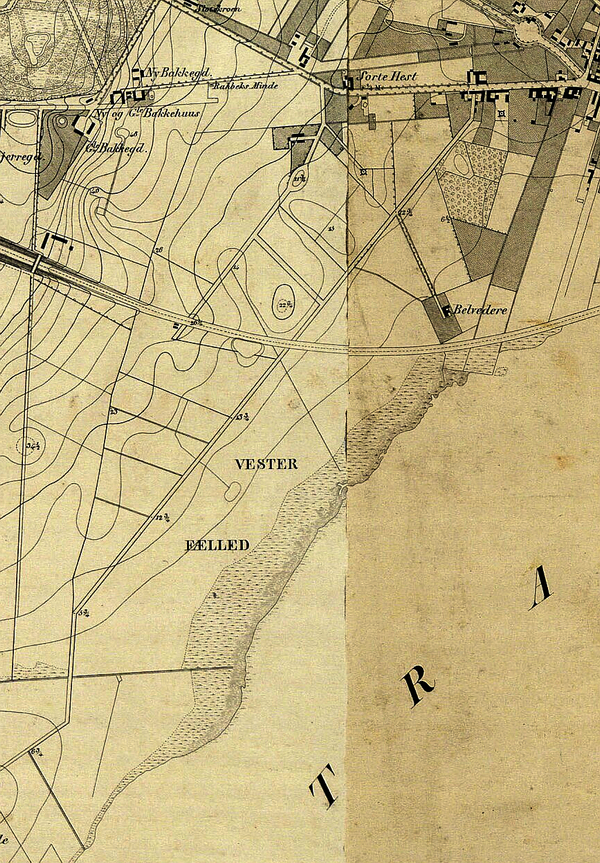
Vesterfælledvej seen on a map detail from 1852

Vesterfælledvej was originally an access road to Copenhagen's Western Common. Its current name was officially adopted in 1869.

=== Early industry ===
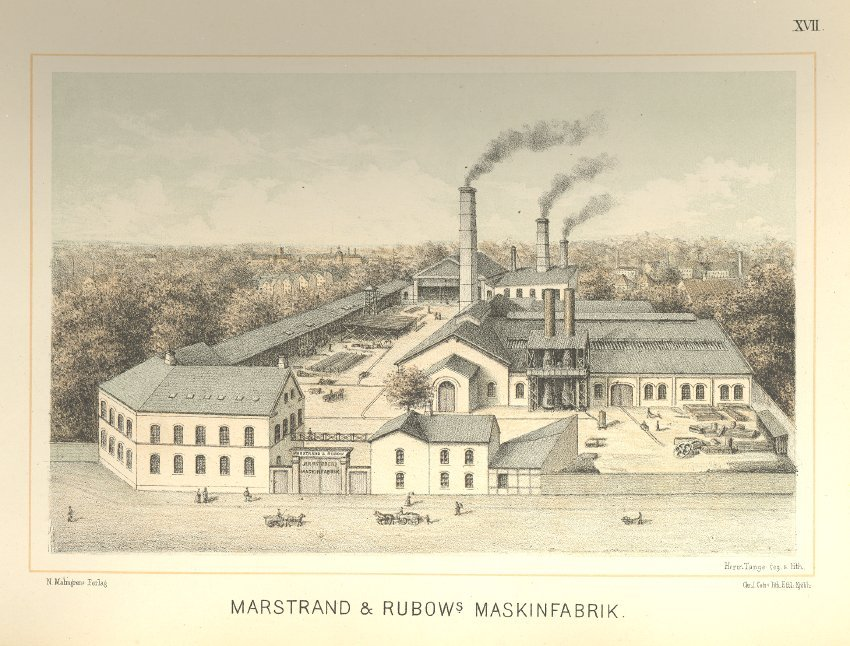
Marstrand & Rubow in 1888

The earliest development along the road was dominated by industrial enterprises. These included Adolph's Chicory Factory and a brickyard on each corner of Bakkegårdsvej.

In 1875, Peter Axel Schmith (d. 1881) and Poul Marstrand established a combined iron foundry and machine factory under the name Schmith & Marstrand at Vester Fælledvej 6. The name of the company was changed to Marstrand & Robow when H. Rubow joined it in 1886.

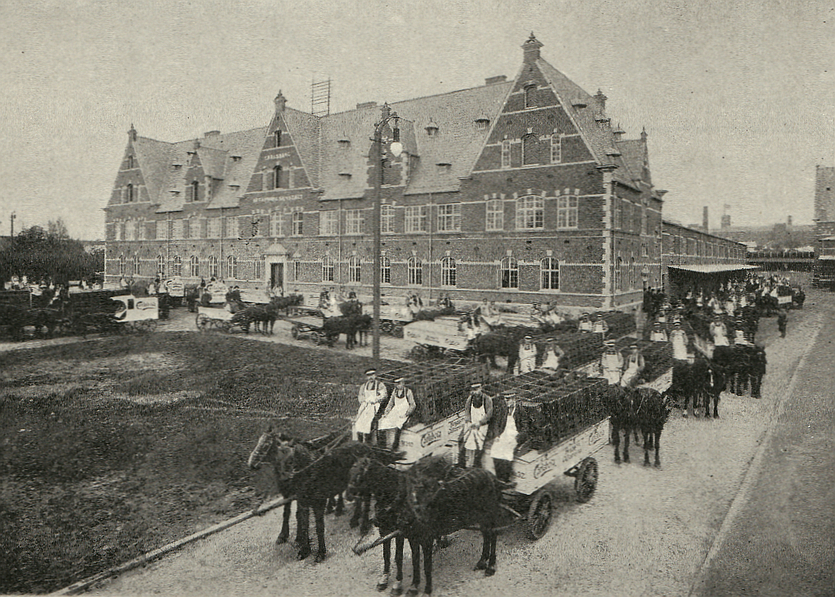
The former Carlsberg Head Oddice

On 23 September 1880, Sophus Napoleon Meyer established a tannery at a neighbouring site. S. N. Meyer & Co. grew to become one of the largest wholesalers of hides in the Nordic countries with branch offices in Sweden, Finland and a number of Russian cities as well as a sales office in New York City. In 1903, it constructed a new head office designed by the architect Thorvald Sørensen at Vesterfælledvej 7.

The west side of the street was around the turn of the century increasingly dominated by the ever-expanding Carlsberg Brewery, culminating with the construction of a new head office in 1927.

=== 20th and 21st centuries ===
The area between Vester Fælledvej, Ny Carlsbergvej, Vester Fælled Møllevej and Enghavevej was around the turn of the century occupied by the Enghaven Allotments, with 166 allotments (kolonihaver). In 1927, it was replaced by Enghaveparken and new municipal housing estate.

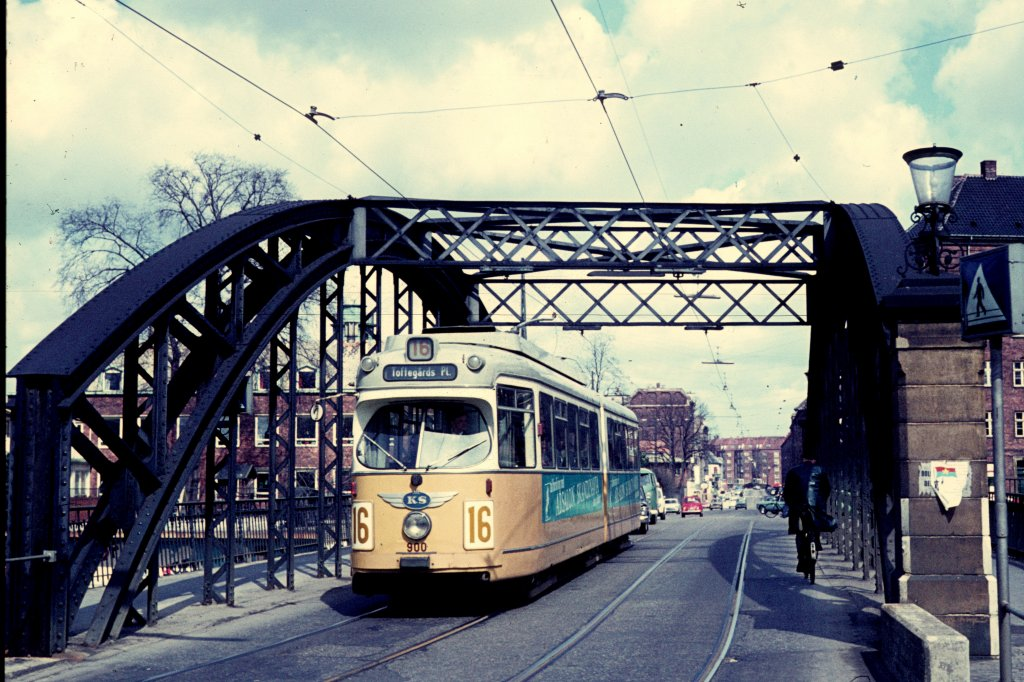
A tram on the Vigerslev Bridge

On 1 December 1911, Vesterfælledvej Station opened on the West Line. On 1 October 1923, its name was changed to Enghave station. The original station building was designed by Heinrich Wenck (demolished in 1984). From 1 November 1934, Enghave was also served by S-trains. The Carlsberg Brewert's private fraight station, Station Hof, opened on a side track in 1937.

== Notable buildings ==
Carlsberg Group's former head office (No. 100) is from 1903 and was designed by Vilhelm Klein. The building was heightened with one floor in 1927.

The block at Vesterfælledvej 61-73/Alsgade 24/Ejderstedgade 18-32/Ny Carlsberg Vej 37 is from 1917 and Christian Mandrup-Poulsenwas designed by Christian Mandrup-Poulsen. The block at Vesterfælledvej 87-91/Angelgade 3-17/Slesviggade 16/Sønder Boulevard 122-36 is from 1923 and was designed by Hans Wright. The building at the corner of Lyrskovgade og Vesterfælledvej is from 1943 to 1944 and was designed by Poul Holsøe and Curt Bie.

== Public art and memorials ==
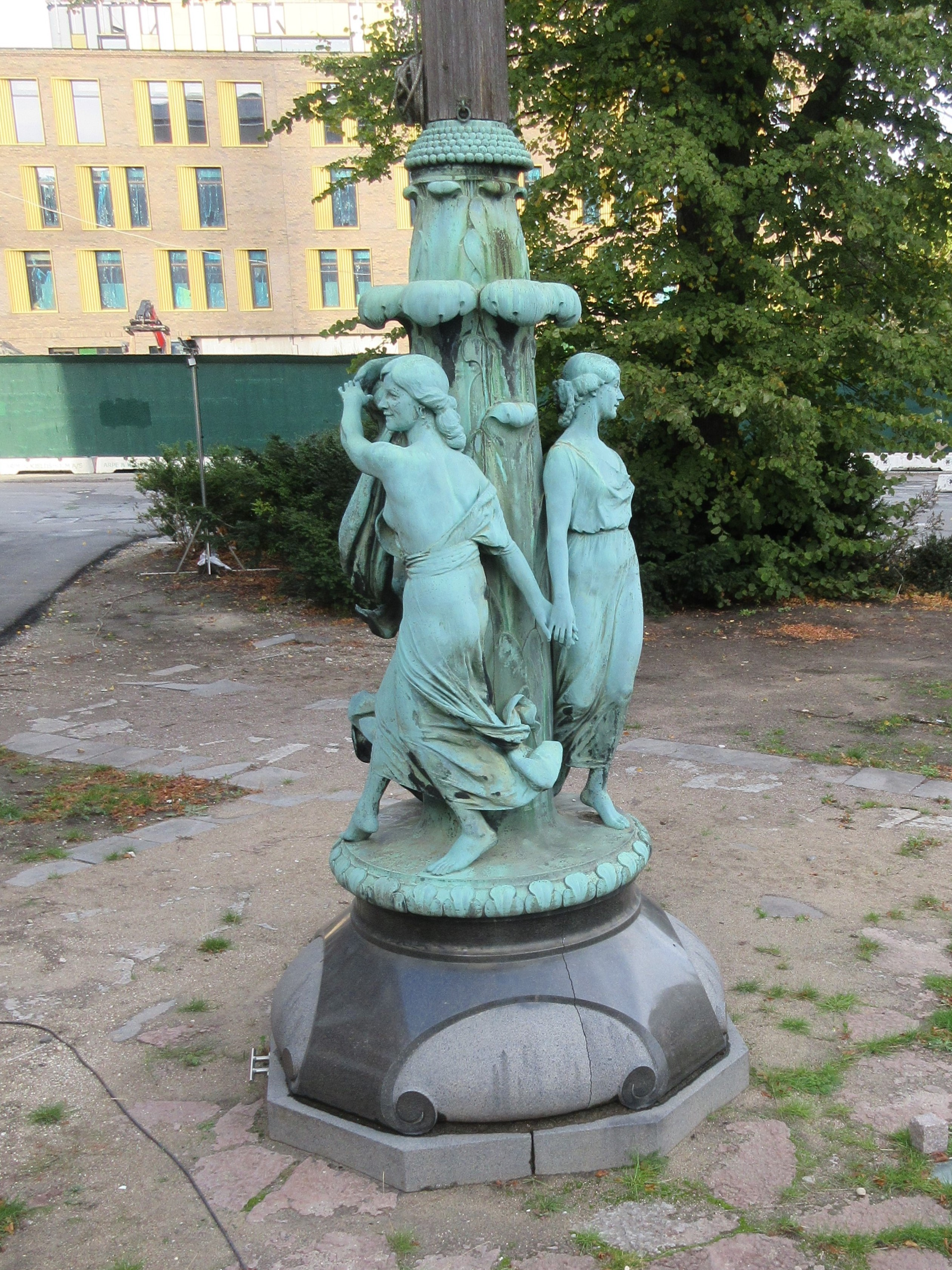
Bonnesen's ballarinas in 2020

In front of the former Carlsberg Head Office stands an octagonal fountain featuring eight bronze reliefs by Max Andersen depicting scenes from the brewery, The fountain was a gift from the brewery's employees in connection with its 100-year anniversary in 1947,

The fountain is flanked by two tall flag poles whose bases feature two group sculptures of three young female dancers. They were created by Carl Johan Bonnesen after he had participated in Carl Jacobsen's competition for the design of the Ballarina Well (now in Helsingør. The competition was won by Rudolph Tegner but Jacobsen was also fond of Bonnesen's entry and subsequently commissioned him to incorporate it in the design of two monumental flag poles for the space in front of the Ny Carlsberg Glyptotek. They were unveiled in 1913 and moved to their current location in 1927.

== Transport ==
Carlsberg S-train station is located at the southern end of the station. The station is located on the network's Høje Tåstrup radial.
