= Camilla Nielsen =

Danish philanthropist and politician

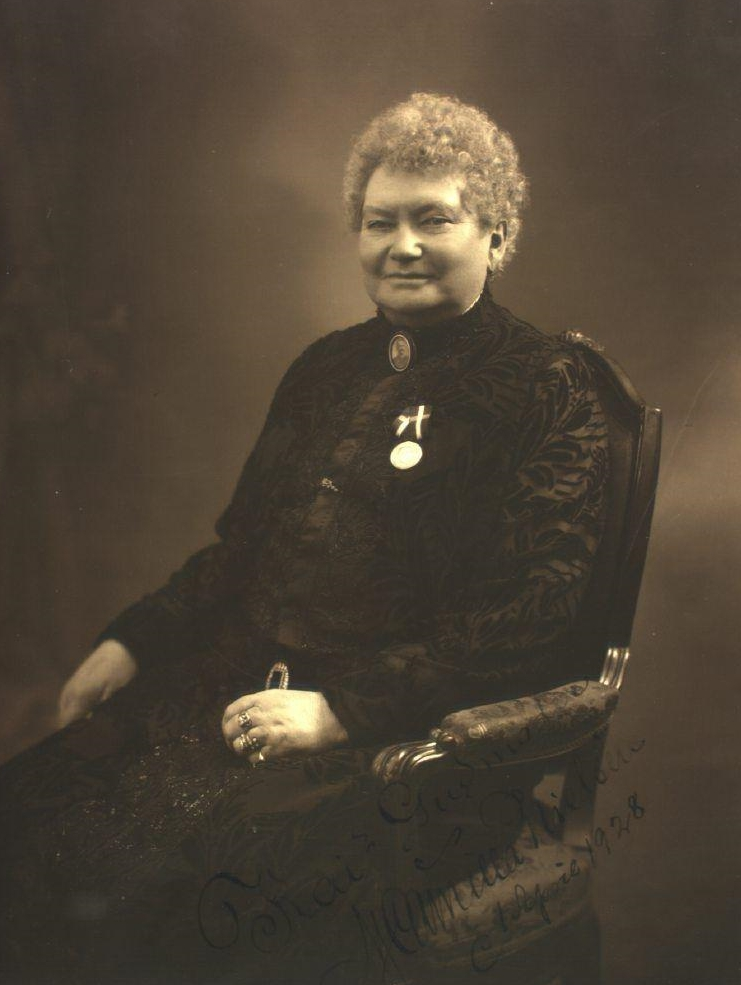
Camilla Nielsen (1928)

Camilla Marie Nielsen née Jensen (1856–1932) was a Danish philanthropist and politician who is remembered for her commitment to social work in the Frederiksberg district of Copenhagen. In 1887, she acquired a dilapidated property on Ny Carlsberg Vej which she adapted to house 75 small apartments for needy families with children. In 1909, after being elected to the board of Frederiksberg's newly established relief fund, she set up a folk kitchen which produced over a thousand meals a day for those in financial difficulties. Increasingly engaged with the Social Democrats, she fought for better housing conditions and improvements for women and children. Not only did she participate in several philanthropic associations in Denmark but in 1915 she was one of the Danish delegates at the Women's Peace Congress in the Hague.

== Early life and family ==
Born on 20 April 1856 in Særslev Parish near Jyderup in Holbæk Municipality, Camilla Marie Nielsen was one of six children, but the only daughter, of the estate owner Jens Jensen (1823–1878) and his wife Ane Kirstine née Kjølsen (1827–1899). In 1881, she married Andreas Frederik Larsen, a workman, with whom she had one child, Jens Frederik (1881). After the marriage was dissolved in 1903, she married the engine driver Christen Nielsen.

Camilla Jensen was raised on a large estate, attending school three days a week. She became so competent in writing and arithmetic that she soon acted as her father's secretary in his farming activities. She spent a year and a half working as a kitchen maid at Algestrup Manor. In 1881, she married a workman with whom she moved to Copenhagen, living from the odd jobs they were able to find.

== Career ==
In 1887, thanks to her contacts with a property agent, she became the owner of a dilapidated building on Ny Carlsbergsvej in Frederiksberg where she went on to renovate 75 small apartments, renting them out at cheap rates to working-class families with children. In 1903, she married her former sweetheart Christen Nielsen, an engine driver who roused her interest in the Social Democrats. He died four years later in the summer of 1907, leaving her to fend for herself. Encouraged by the Social Democratic Women's Association, in 1908 she was elected to serve on the board of the Frederiksberg relief fund, a position she maintained for the rest of her life. The following year, she was called upon to run the local kitchen facility where she prepared over a thousand servings a day of good, cheap food, most of the expenses being covered by the relief fund.

With the additional needs resulting from World War I, in 1917 she ran the Frederiksborg Folk Kitchen, producing 3,000 dinners a day as well as meals for children during the winter months. Thanks to the support she was able to muster, the operation which continued until 1931, did not incur any costs for the municipality.

On the political front, Nielsen was a board member of the Social Democratic Women's Association, while in 1917 she was elected a member of the board of Frederksberg Municipality, where she served until her death in 1932. With the outbreak of the First World War, she became a member of the Danish Peace Society (Dansk Fredsforening). Together with Andrea Brochmann, she represented the Social Democrats at the 1915 Women's Peace Conference in the Hague, becoming a member of the Danish branch of the Women's International League for Peace and Freedom. She was also a member of several other philanthropic associations including the Peter Sabroes Foundation and children's home, the Odd Fellows Rebekka Home and Princess Helena's children's home.

Camilla Nielsen died on 16 December 1932 in Frederiksberg. She is buried in Frederiksberg Cemetery.

== Awards ==
In 1928, Nielsen was honoured with the Medal of Merit.
