= Dipylon, Carlsberg =

Building in Copenhagen, Denmark

Dipylon
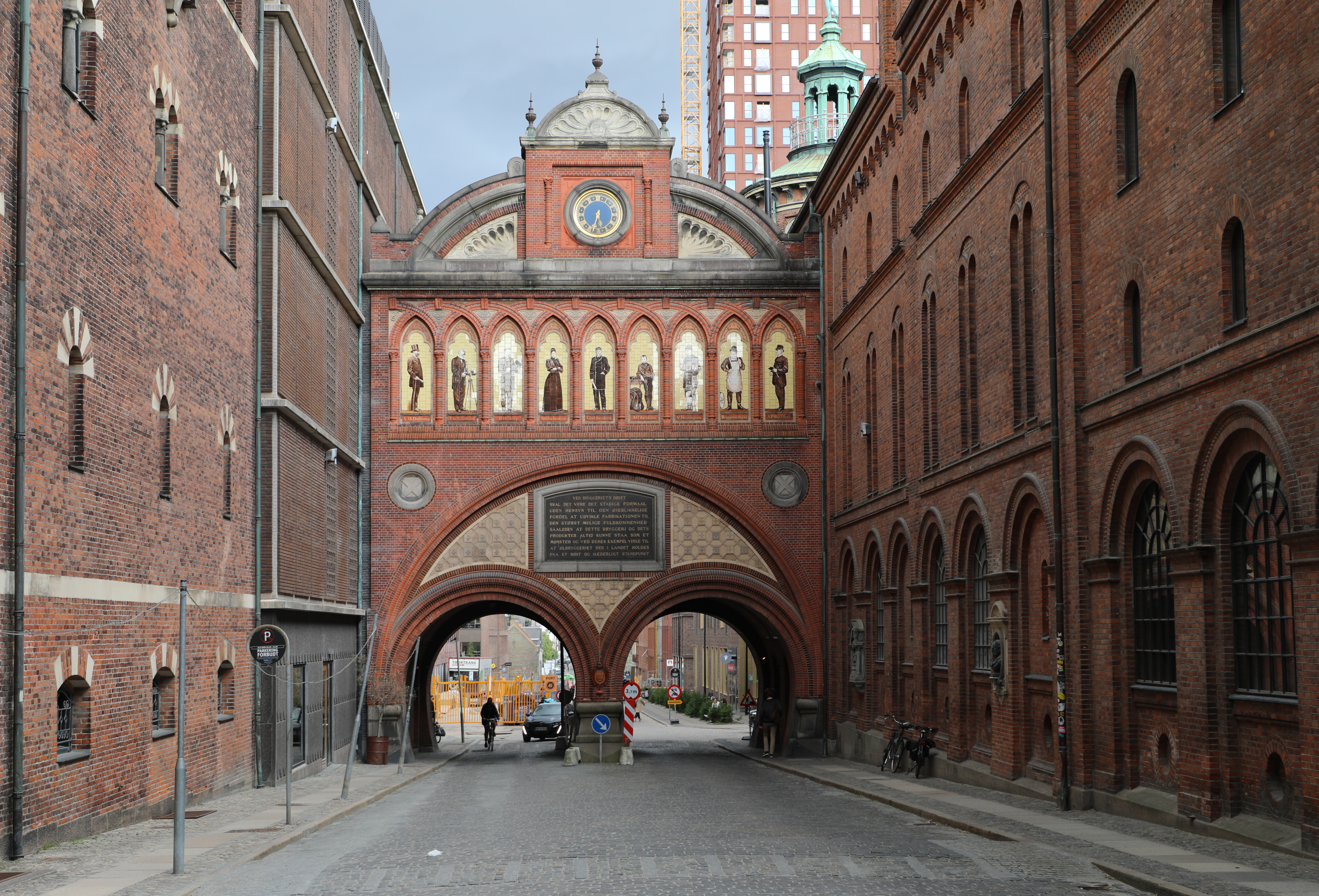
- The Dipylon seen from the courtyard side
- Interactive map of the Dipylon area

General information
- Architectural style: Historicism
- Location: Copenhagen, Denmark
- Coordinates: 55.6672°N 12.5333°E
- Completed: 1892
- Client: Carl Jacobsen

Design and construction
- Architect: Vilhelm Dahlerup

The Dipylon, or the Double Gate (Danish: Dobbeltporten), is a landmark structure which spans Ny Carlsberg Vej in the Carlsberg area of Copenhagen, Denmark. Part of the now decommissioned Carlsberg Brewery site, it combines a double-arched gateway, from which it takes its name, with a clock tower.

The name which simply means "double gate" in Greek, refers to a gateway in the north-west of ancient Athens.

== History ==
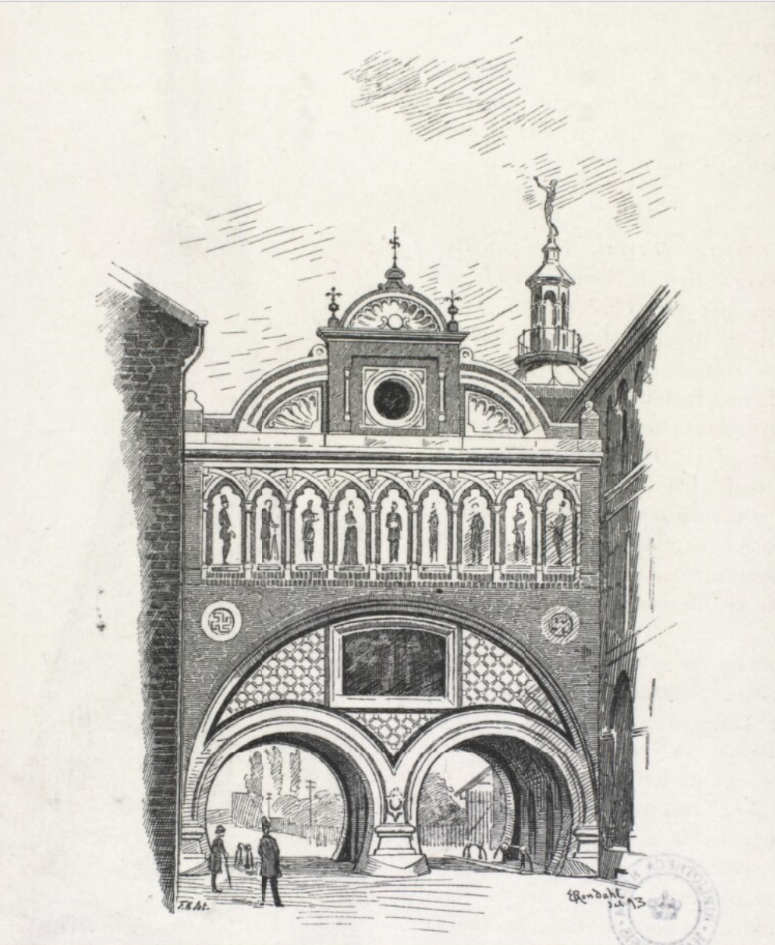
The front side, facing Vesterbro

Designed by Vilhelm Dahlerup, the Dipylon structure was built in 1892, at a time when the Ny Carlsberg complex was still under redevelopment and far from finished.

The gateway of the lower part marked the Vesterbro-side entrance to the Ny Carlsberg complex, complementing the Elephant Gate to the west which afforded access to the brewery from the Valby side.

Above the gateway, the building originally contained two malting floors. Through two valves, one in each arch, malt mash could be poured into waiting wagons.

== Architecture and artwork ==
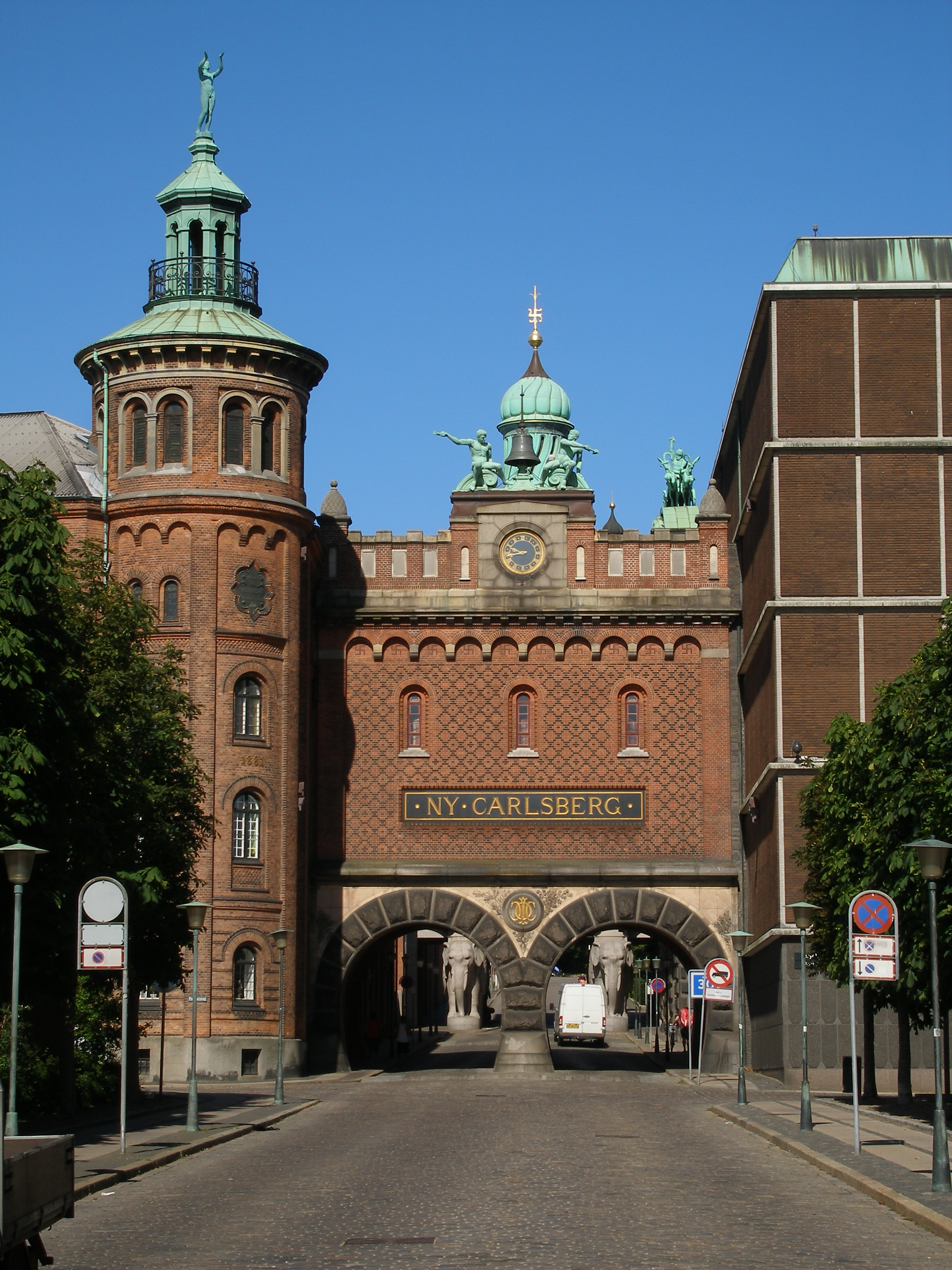
The front side, facing Vesterbro

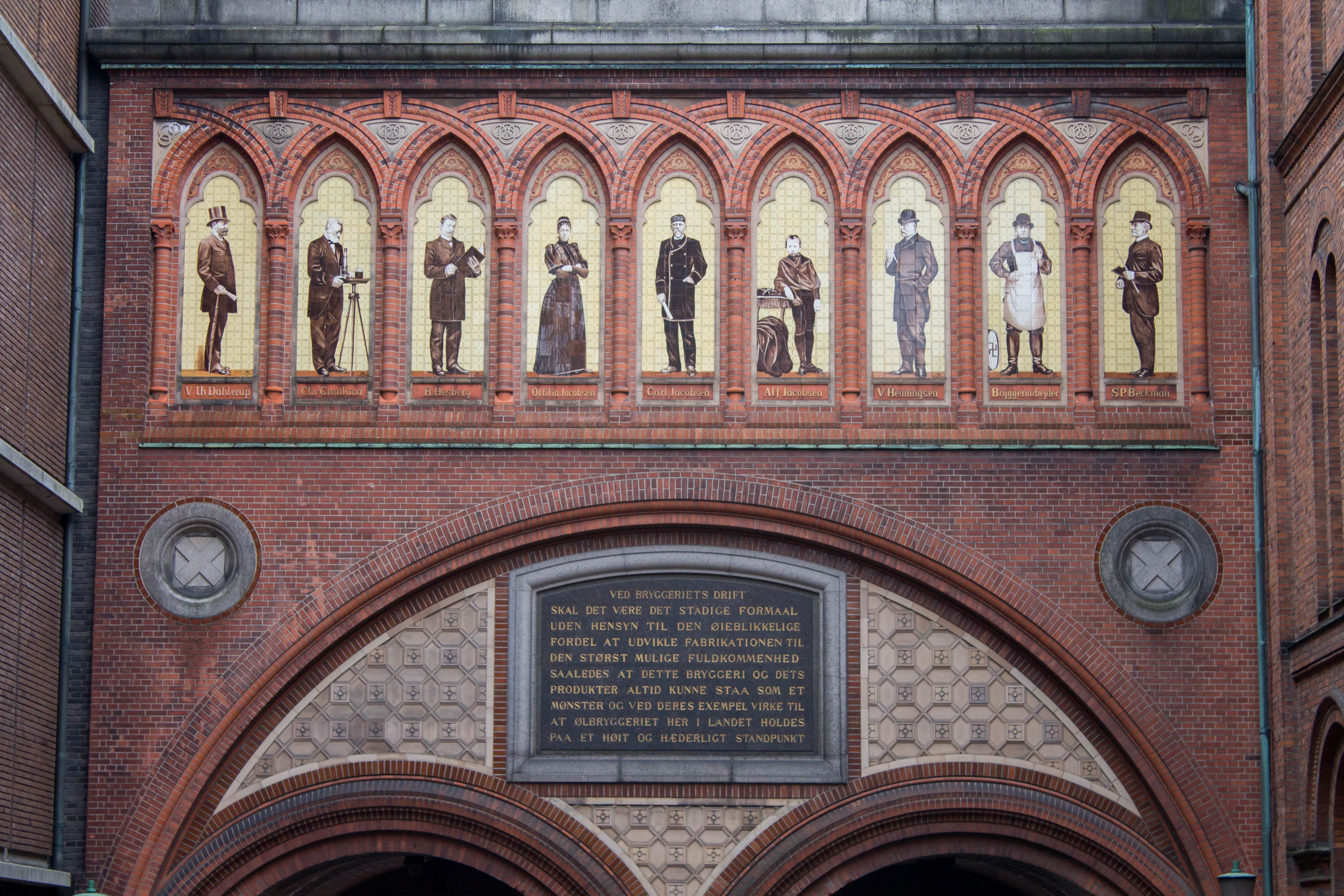
The portrait frieze

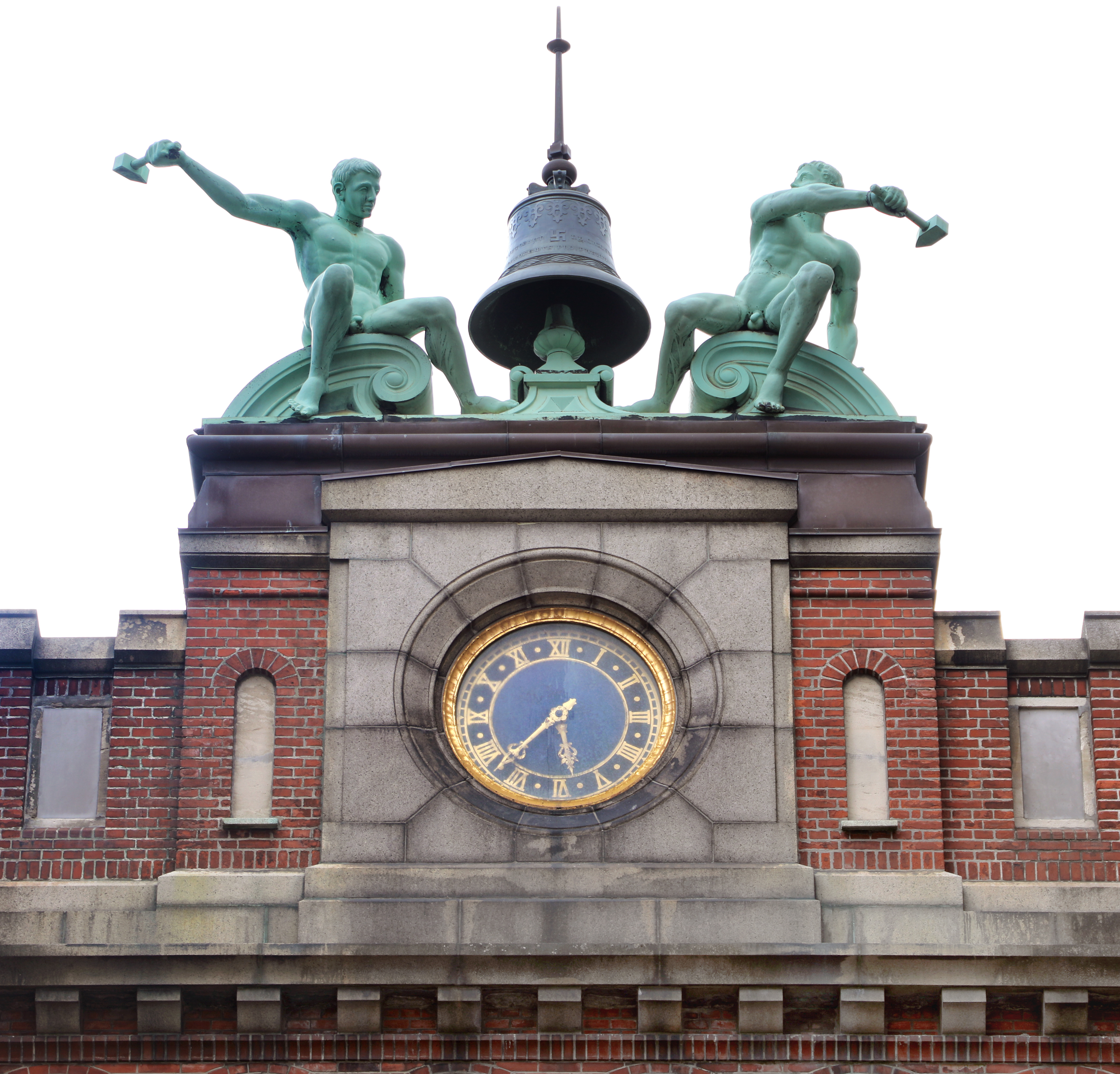
The Bell Strikers

The Dipylon building is built in red brick in the ornate Historicist style which is typical both of the Carlsberg area in general and especially of Vilhelm Dahlerup's work.

The arches have granite rustication. Above them there is a diagonal pattern in glazed and red tiles.

On the front (Vesterbro) side of the building, an integrated sign above the arches simply reads "Ny Carlsberg". Similarly placed on the rear (courtyard) side of the structure, there is a plate which is inscribed with a quotation from J.C. Jacobsen's will which was later adopted by Carl Jacobsen as a motto:

In the brewery's operations, a constant goal, regardless of immediate gain, should be to develop the art of making beer to the greatest possible degree of perfection so that the brewery and its products may ever serve as a model and, by their example, assist in keeping beer brewing in this country at a high and honourable level.

On the rear side of the gate building, a frieze consisting of nine tile paintings depicts various key figures in the construction and operation of brewery.

In the centre stands Carl Jacobsen, flanked by his wife, Ottilia, and his son Alf who was the chosen heir but died in 1890 shortly before the building was completed. The other figures are Carl’s closest collaborators in building the brewery, Vilhelm Dahlerup and master builder S. P. Beckmann, and, representing the brewery’s employees, Professor Christian Grønlund, office manager R. Hesberg, chief inspector V. Henningsen, and an ordinary brewery worker.

On the upper part of the building is a double-faced clock created by leading Danish clockmaker Julius Bertram Larsen. Its roof-top bell is flanked by the Bell strikers, a group statue by Stephan Sinding.

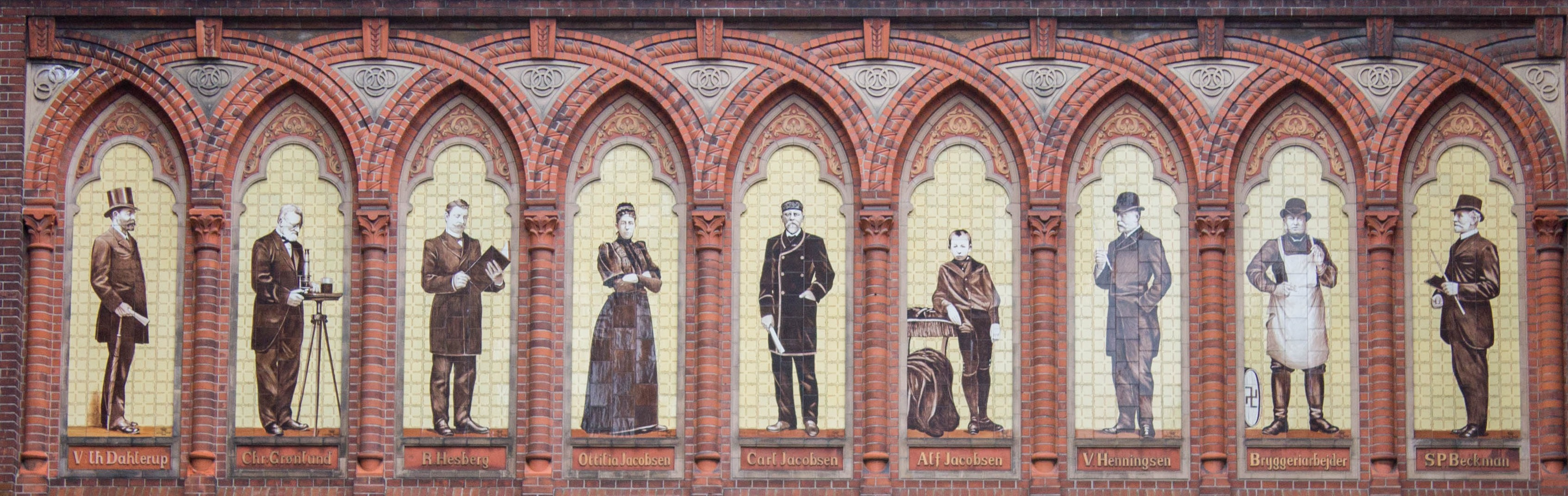
Dipylon's portrait frieze - from the left: Vilhelm Dahlerup, Christian Grønlund, R. Hesberg, Ottilia Jacobsen, Carl Jacobsen

== See also ==
- Ny Carlsberg Glyptotek
- Jesus Church, Valby
