= Elephant Tower, Carlsberg =

Building in Copenhagen, Denmark

Elephant Tower
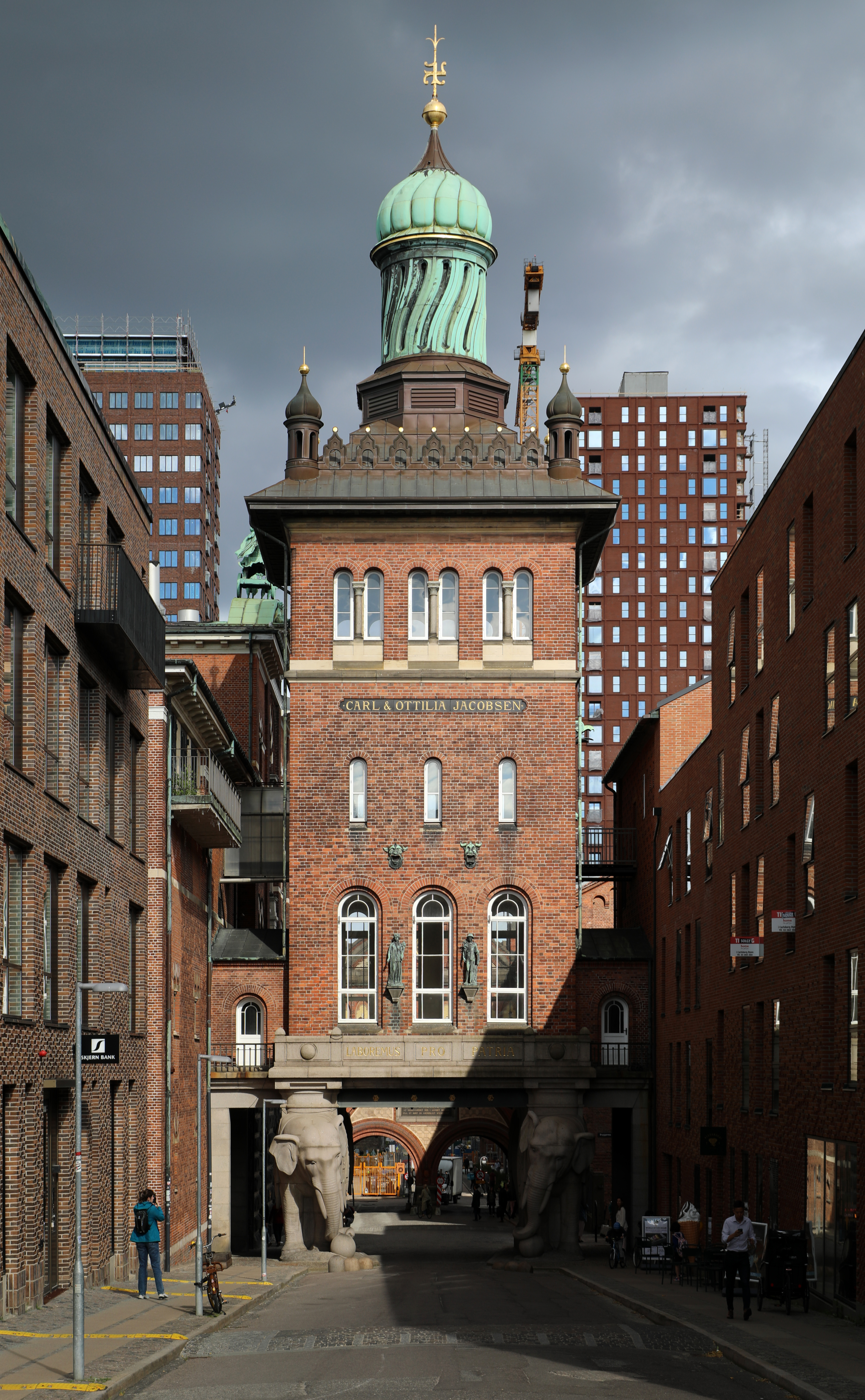
- The Elephant Tower in 2004
- Interactive map of the Elephant Tower area

General information
- Architectural style: Historicism
- Location: Copenhagen, Denmark
- Coordinates: 55.6673°N 12.5323°E
- Completed: 1901
- Client: Carl Jacobsen

Design and construction
- Architect: Vilhelm Dahlerup

The Elephant Tower (Danish: Elefanttårnet) (also known as the Elephant Gate (Danish: Elefantporten)) is the most famous landmark of the Carlsberg district in Copenhagen, Denmark, the original brewery site of the Carlsberg Breweries (the area is now under redevelopment as a new neighbourhood). The tower takes its name from four large granite elephants which flank the gate, standing back to back carrying the tower on their backs.

== History ==
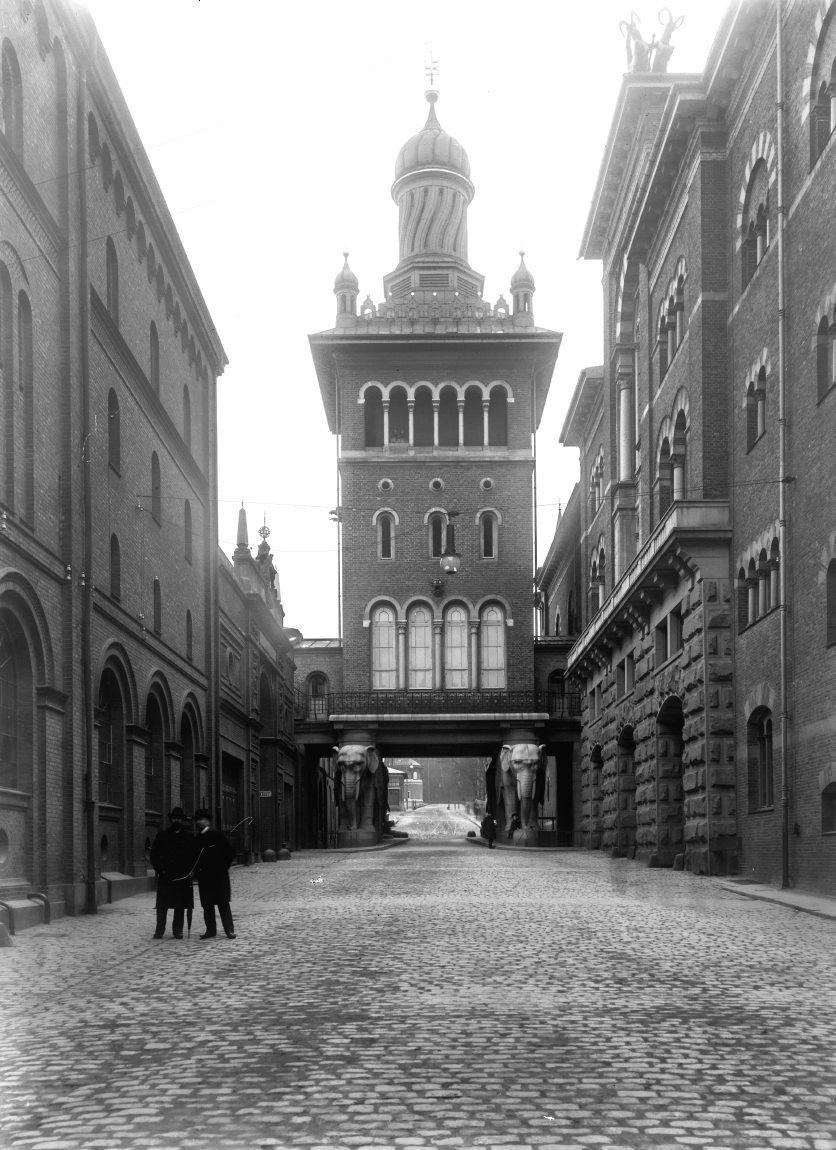
The Elephant Tower photographed by Frederik Riise

Completed in 1901, the Elephant Tower was built at the same time as the Ny Carlsberg Brewhouse. The architect was Vilhelm Dahlerup, who also worked on the previous stages but not the new brewhouse which was designed by Vilhelm Klein. Along with the original Ny Carlsberg building and the Dipylon, the tower formed the core of Ny Carlsberg complex, centred around a courtyard. The space above the tower originally served as a water tower and herb silo.

The new Elephant Tower marked the entrance to the brewery from the Valby side, complementing the Dipylon which served as the entrance from the city.

== Architecture ==
Typical of Ny Carlsberg's architecture and Vilhelm Dahlerup's work in general, the Elephant Tower is built in a colourful Historicist style inspired by various periods and cultures.

=== Elephants ===
The elephant feature, which was Carl Jacobsen's own idea, was inspired by Bernini's obelisk-carrying elephant on Piazza della Minerva in Rome. The four elephants were created by the sculptor Hans Peder Pedersen-Dan, based on a sketch by Dahlerup.

=== The spire ===
The upper tower, which has a floor area of only 115 square metres, is built in red, ornamental brick. It has tall, round-arched windows and is topped by a copper-clad onion dome.

== Image gallery ==
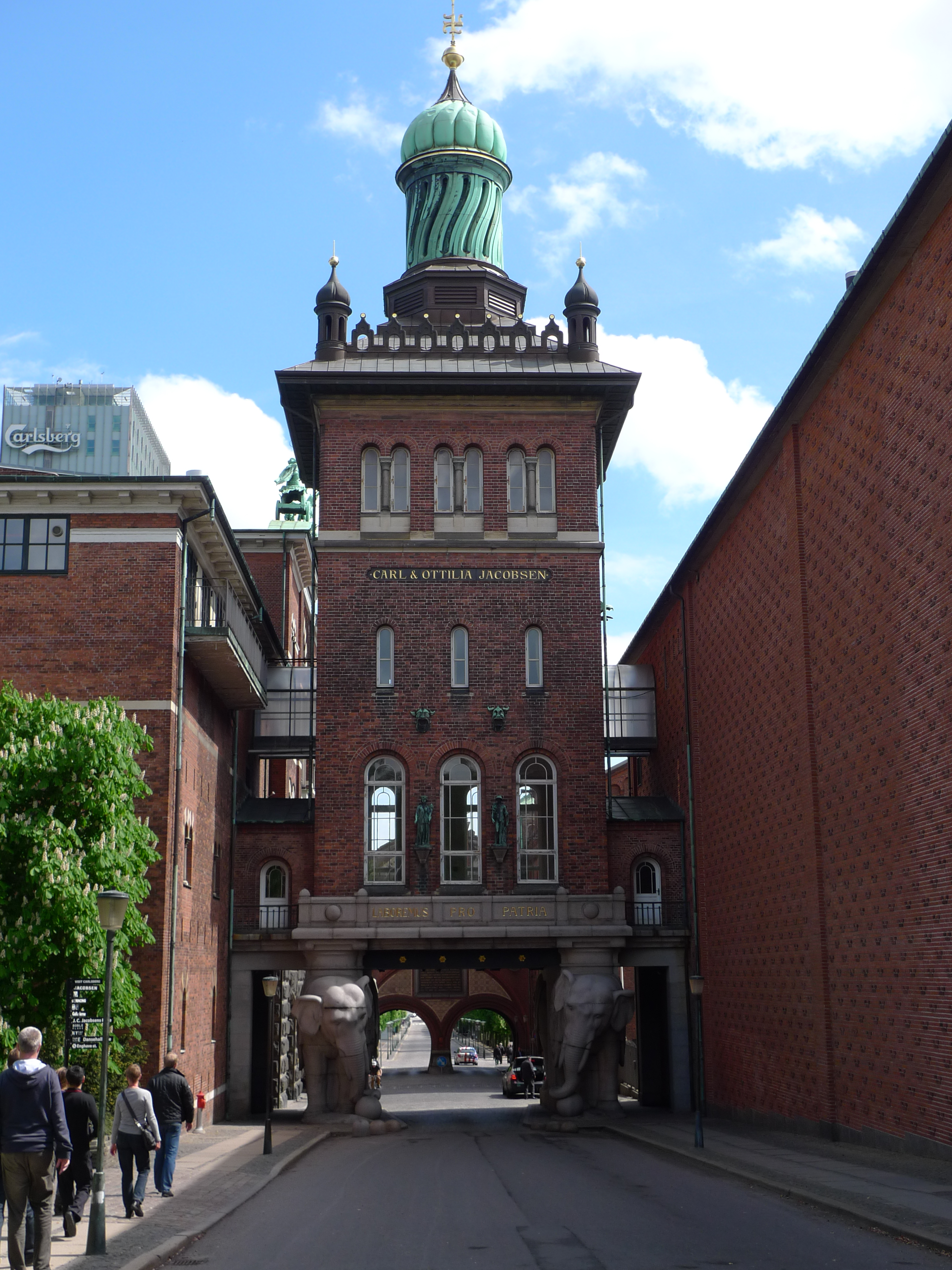
The tower viewed from the west

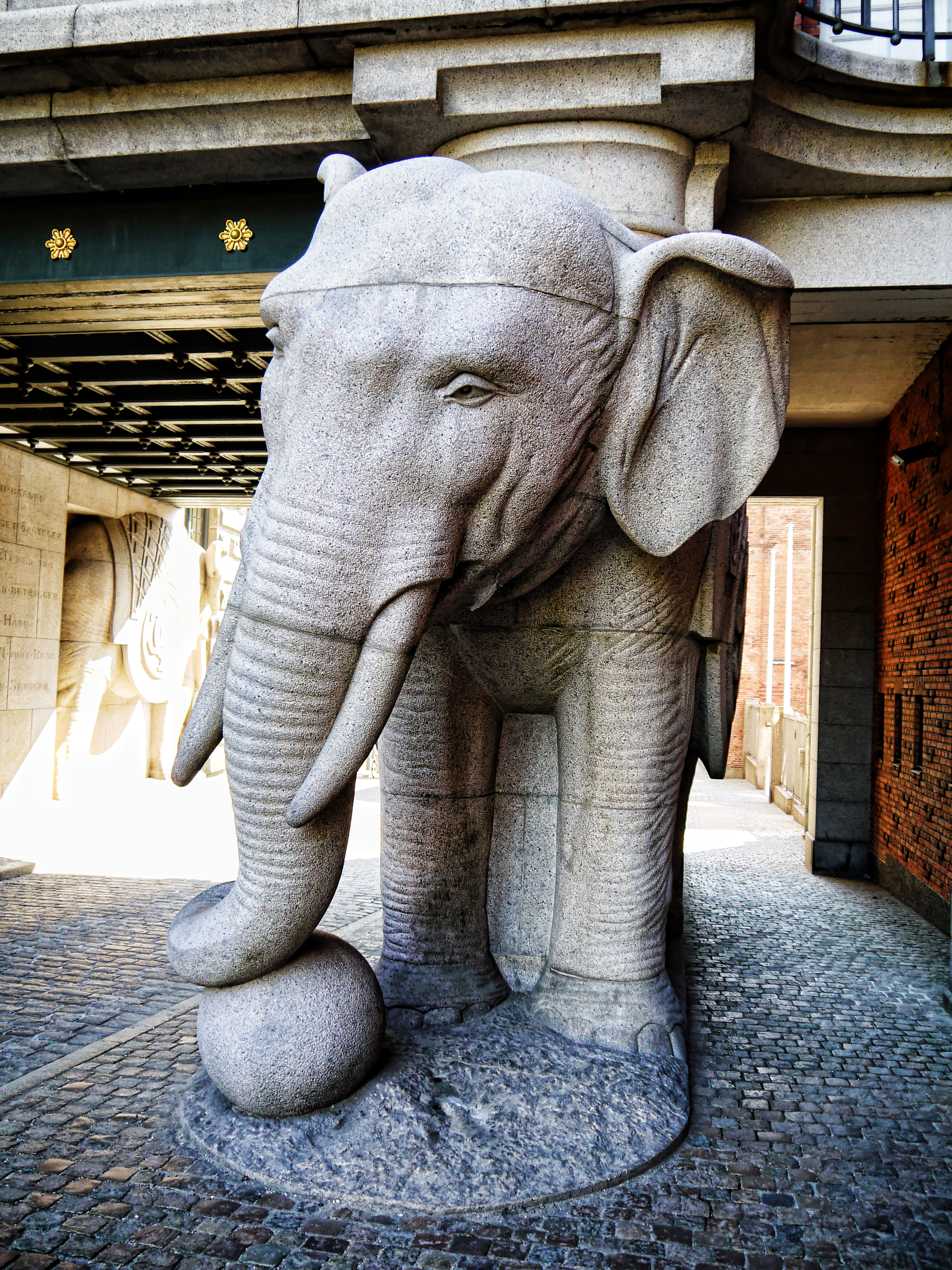
One of the elephants

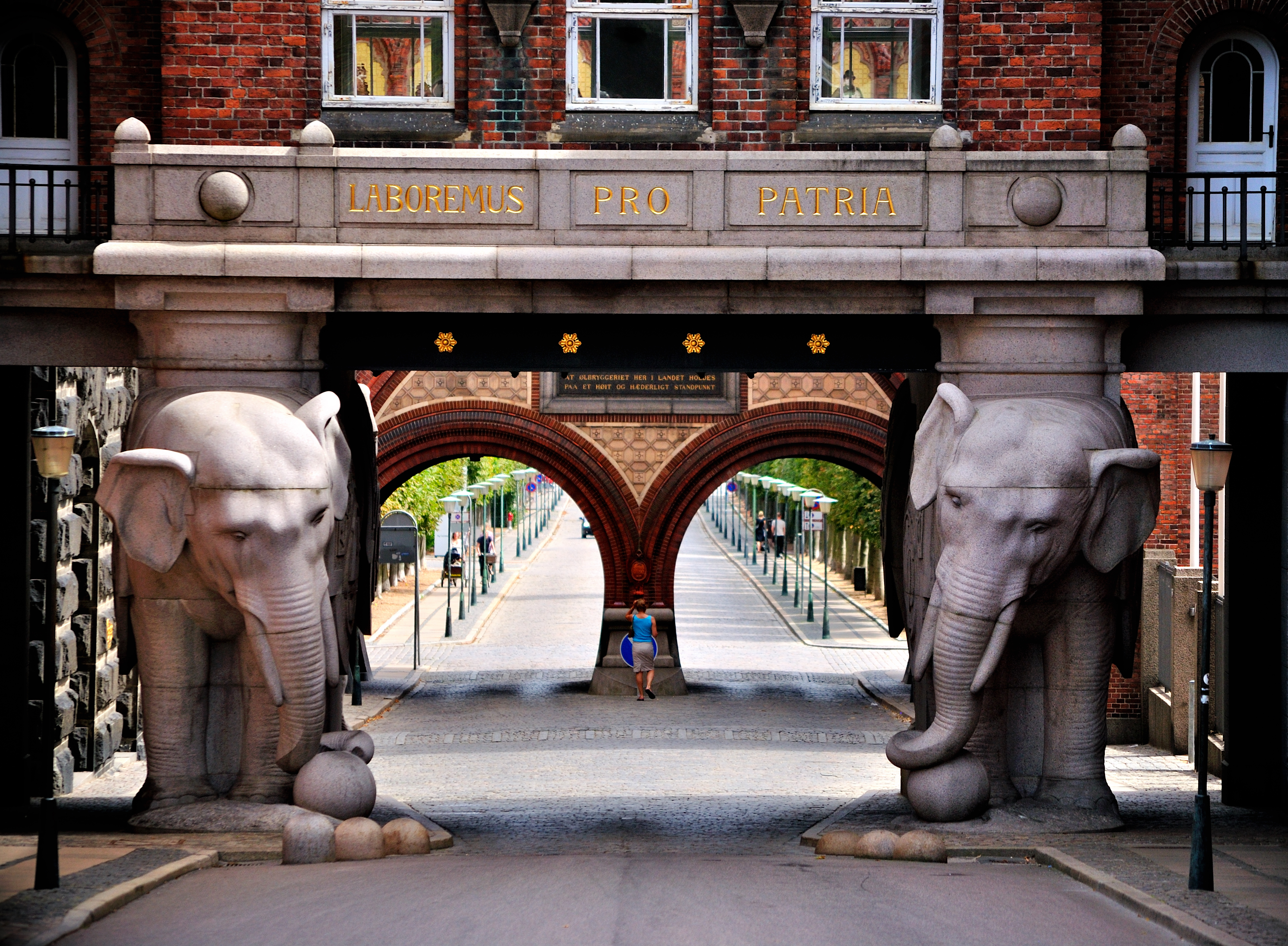
Detail of the gate viewed from the west

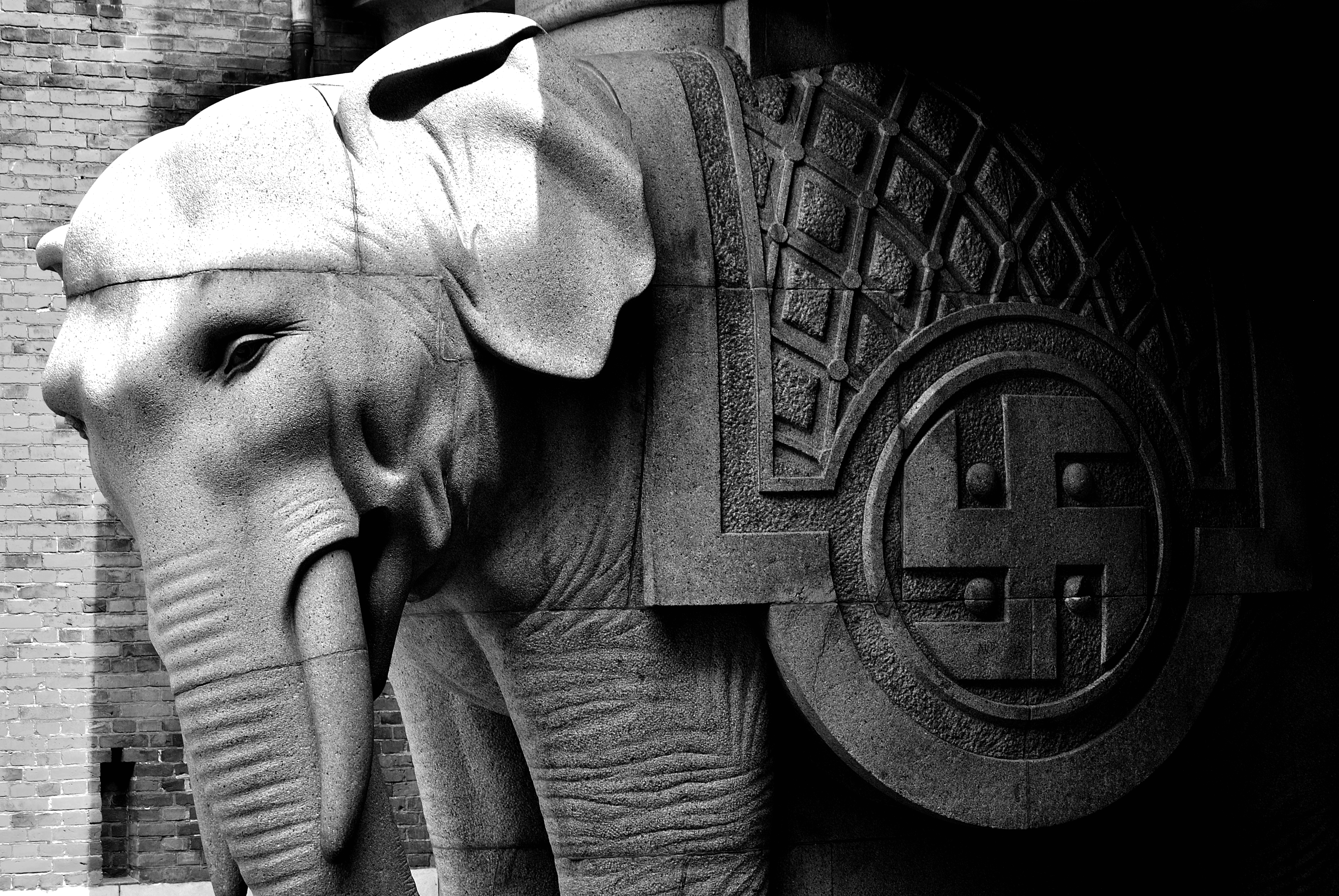
Detail of one of the elephants

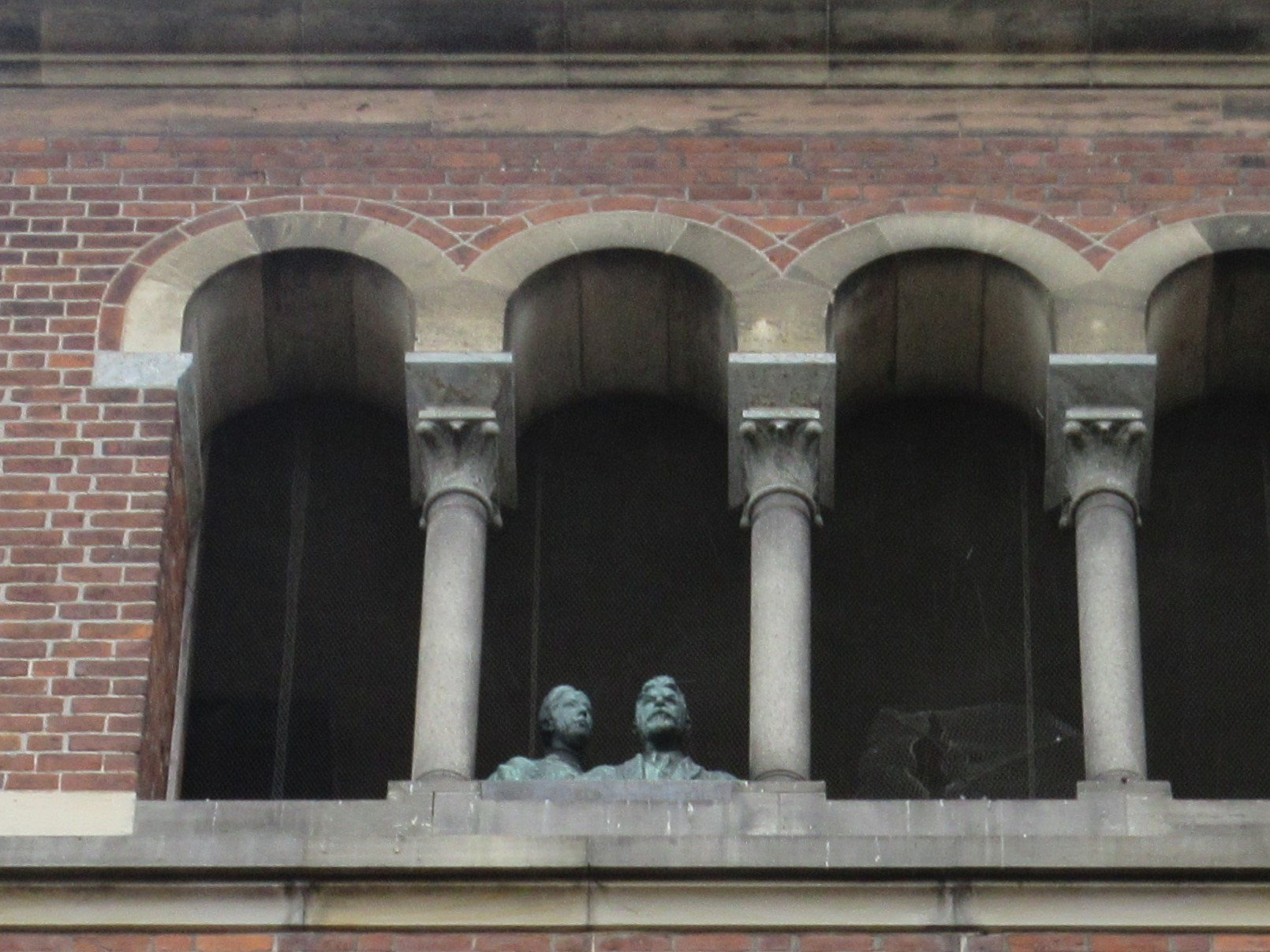
Bust of Carl and Ottilia Jacobsen

== See also ==
- Alexander Nevsky Church, Copenhagen
