= Enghaveparken =

Park in Copenhagen Municipality, Denmark

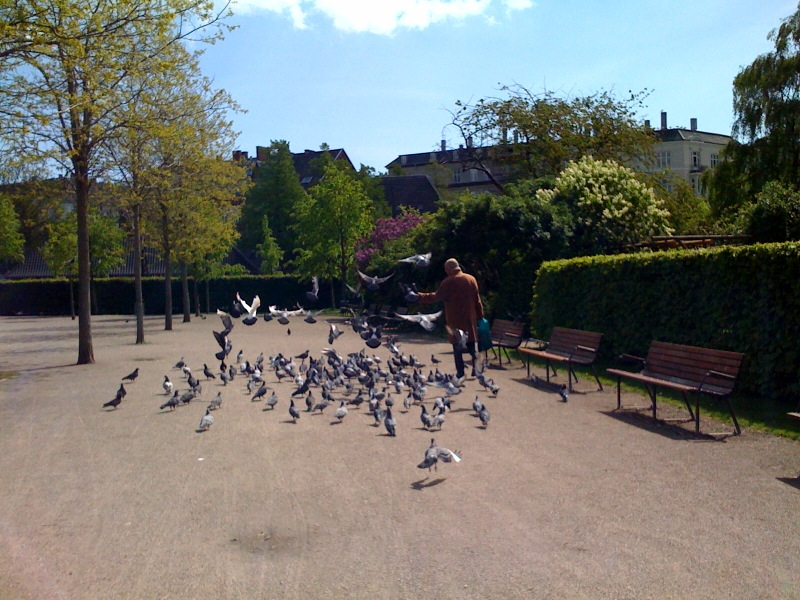
- Interactive map of Enghaveparken
- Type: Public
- Location: Vesterbro, Copenhagen
- Coordinates: 55°40′01″N 12°32′31″E
- Area: 4 hectares
- Created: 1929
- Owner: Copenhagen Municipality

Enghaveparken is a public park in the Vesterbro district of Copenhagen, Denmark. It was laid out in the late 1920s to cater for the citizens of the expanding city.

The park is designed in the Neoclassical style. It has grassy lawns, flower beds and contains a bandstand, a playground and facilities for sports as well as barbecuing.

== History ==
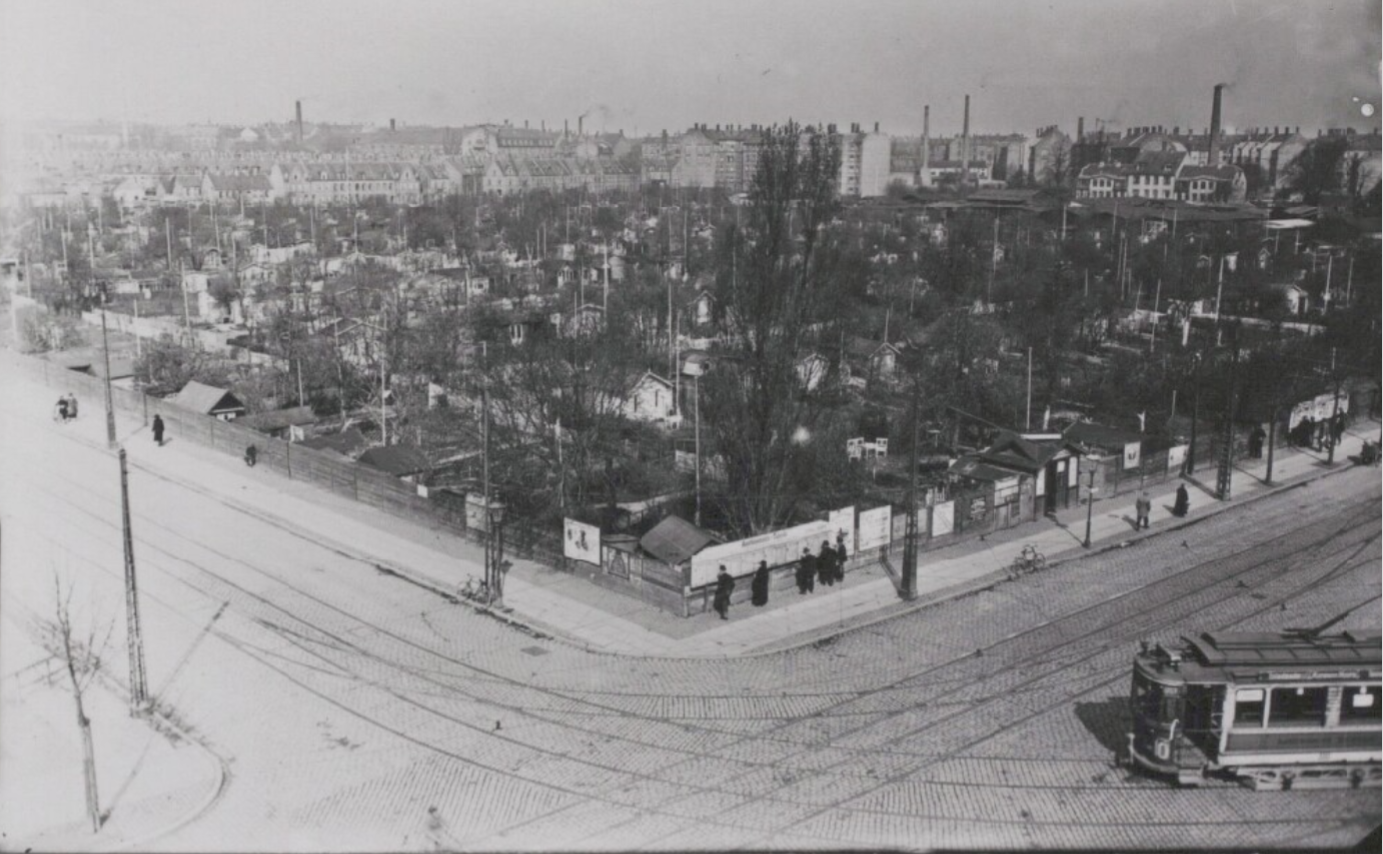
The allotments that were located at the site before the park was created

In the late 19th century, the Royal Danish Horticultural Society established 478 allotments in "Dronningens Enghave" at the site where Enghaveparken lies today. In the 1920s the allotments were moved and the small public park Enghaven was laid out under the direction of City Architect Poul Holsøe, who also designed the red-brick social housing which was built at the same time and borders the park on three sides. Tredje Natur has won a competition to redesign the park.

== Layout and features ==
The slightly rectangular park is divided into six spaces: a water garden, a rose garden, a perennial garden, a sports section, a playground and a 'meeting place'.

=== Basin and fountain ===
Along its central axis, in front of the main entrance which faces Enghavevej, there is a gravel area centred on a square basin with a fountain. It is popular with ducks and grey heron which come from a colony on a small island in close by Frederiksberg Park.

=== Bandstand ===
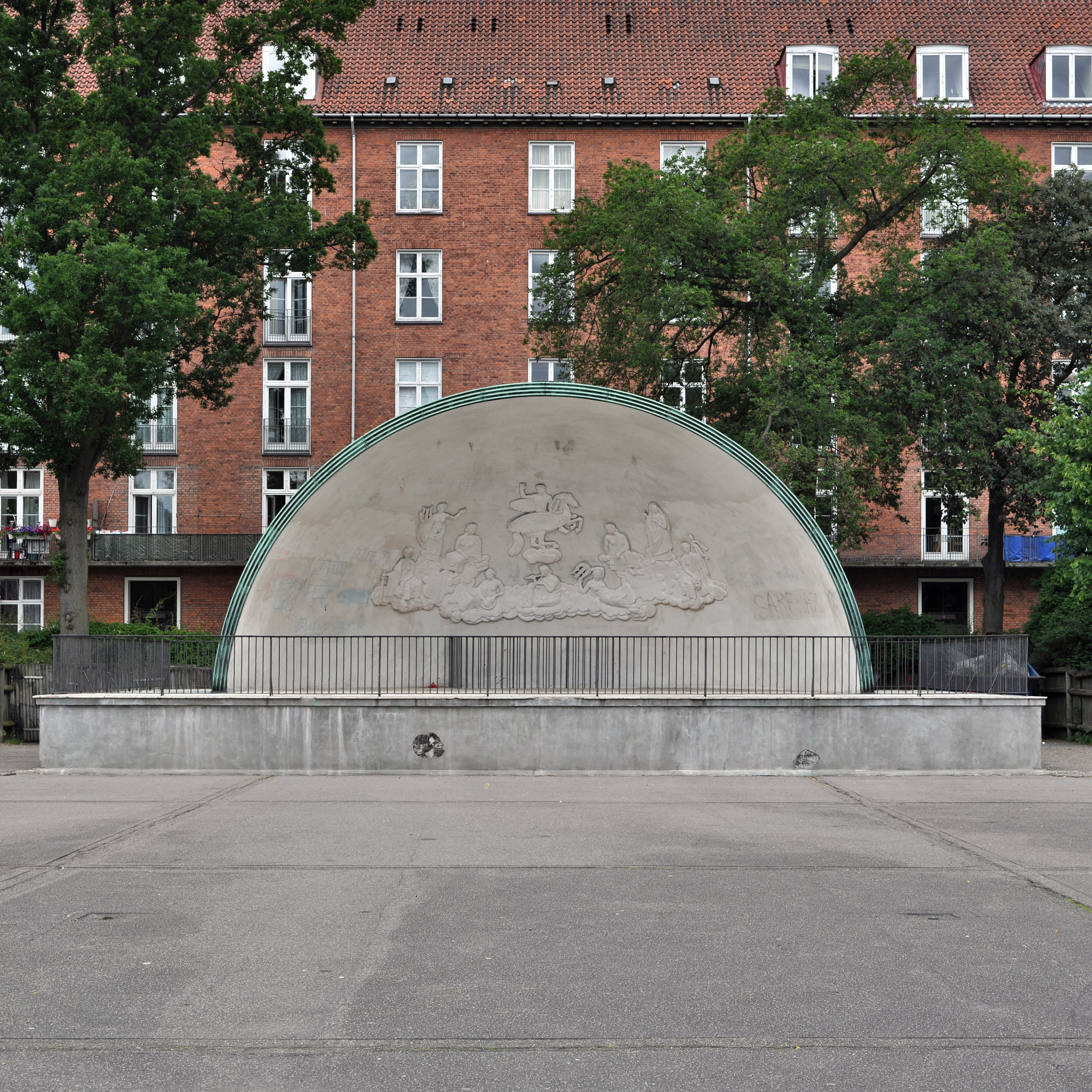
Arne Jacobsen's band stand

At the extreme far end of the central axis, opposite the main entrance, stands a bandstand. It was designed by later famous Danish Modernist architect and designer Arne Jacobsen who spend his two first years after leaving architecture school working at Poul Holsøe's office. It is one of his only Neoclassical works. A year later he opened his own practice and built his first Modernist building. The bandstand is decorated with figure reliefs by Aage Nielsen-Edwin, depicting Apollo and the Nine Muses.

=== Sculptures ===
In front of the main entrance stands the statue Venus med Æblet (Venus with the apple) by Kai Nielsen. The tight budget only allowed for this single piece of art at the time of the inauguration. Nielsen was popular with the Danish Neoclassical movement of the time, his work for instance dominates Carl Petersen's Faaborg Museum, the first major building of the movement. In 1933, Einar Utzon-Frank's statue Ungdom (Youth) was added.

== Water infrastructure ==
In 2019, as part of Copenhagen's broader cloudburst management adaptation plan, Enghaveparken was redesigned to serve as a major piece of stormwater infrastructure. The park sits on more than eight acres at the foot of the hill where Carlsberg ran its original brewery, making it particularly vulnerable to flooding from uphill runoff.

The renovation preserved the park's neoclassical character—including its sunken lawn, symmetrical layout, and brick pergola—while integrating flood-control features. Heavy concrete barriers lining the park's central space are fitted with hydraulic floodgates that rise automatically during storm events, allowing the park to retain up to 22,000 cubic metres (approximately 5.8 million gallons) of stormwater for up to 24 hours before releasing it gradually into the drainage system once pipe capacity clears.

Additional features include a hockey rink that doubles as a reservoir and a lawn planted over an underground retention chamber, which allows the city to recycle collected stormwater for irrigating plantings and cleaning nearby streets. The park reopened in August 2024. Within five days of reopening, an extreme rain event tested the new infrastructure; the basins performed as designed, forming a series of temporary ponds across the park.

== Activities ==
The park is popular with locals for sunbathing or picnicking. It also has facilities for skater hockey, basketball, football and pétanque. The bandstand is frequently used for open-air concerts.

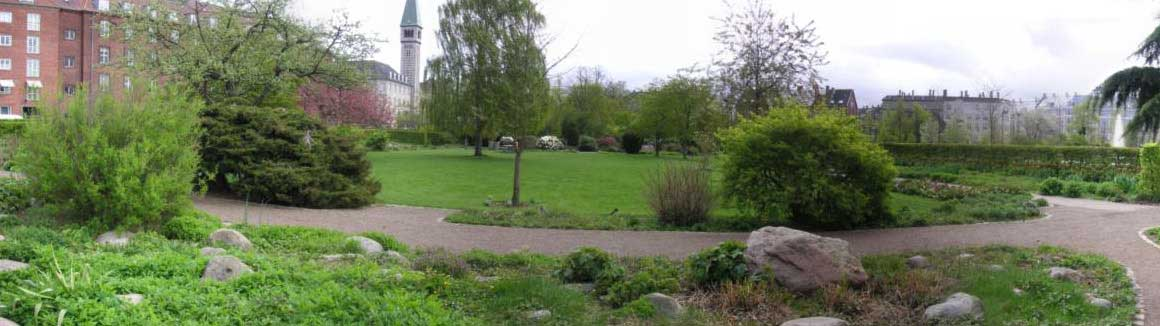
A panorama of the park with the tower of Church of Christ visible in the background

== See also ==
- Parks and open spaces in Copenhagen
