= Carl Nielsen Monument =

Monument in Copenhagen, Denmark

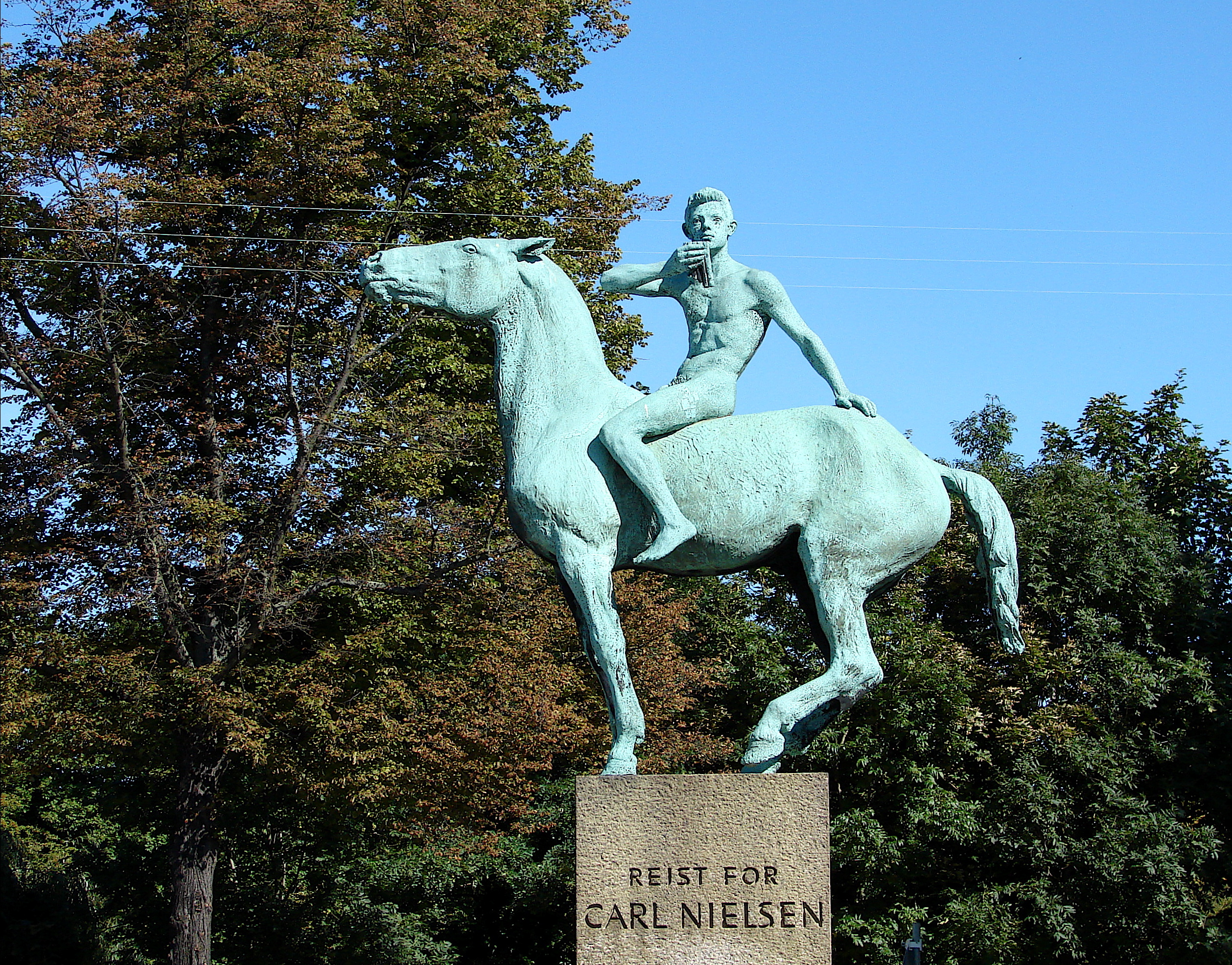
- Interactive map of Carl Nielsen Monument
- Location: Copenhagen, Denmark
- Designer: Anne Marie Carl-Nielsen
- Type: Equestrian statue
- Material: Bronze and granite
- Opening date: 17 December 1939
- Dedicated to: Carl Nielsen

The Carl Nielsen Monument, located at the corner of Grønningen and Store Kongensgade in central Copenhagen, Denmark, is a monument to Danish composer Carl Nielsen created by his wife Anne Marie Carl-Nielsen. It depicts a young man playing pan-pipes on a wingless Pegasus and is also known as The Genius of Music (Danish: Musikkens Genius). The original plaster model is owned by the Carl Nielsen Museum in Odense.

== Description ==
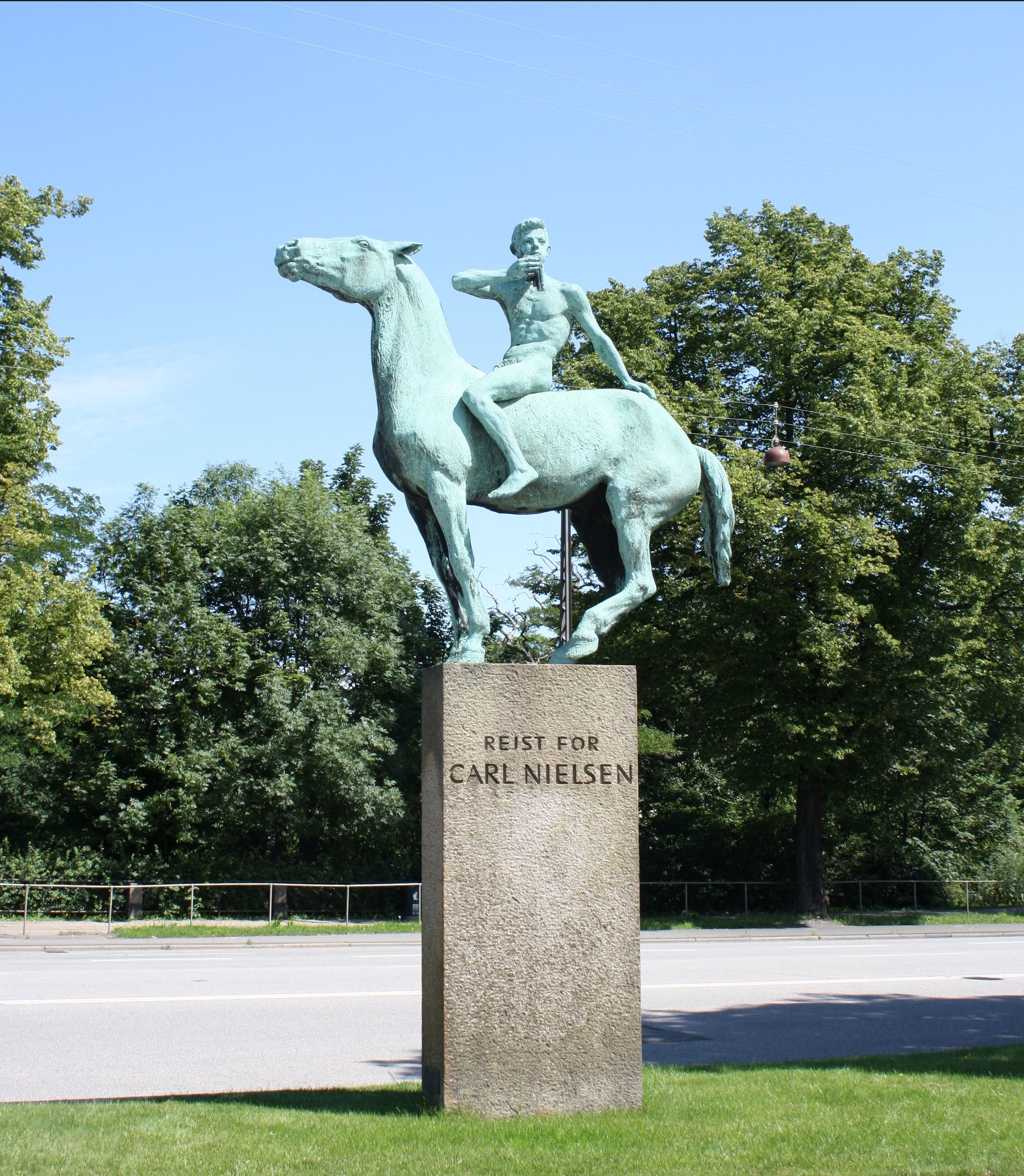
The monument with Grønningen in the background

The monument is an allegorical equestrian statue. Horse and man are depicted in a dynamic pose. The naked young man with pan-pipes represents Pan, god of music in Greek mythology. His face strongly resembles that of a young Carl Nielsen. The Pegasus figure had wings in Anne Marie Carl-Nielsen's earlier models but the wings were left out in the final design.

Carl-Nielsen has commented on the design that "What I wanted to show in my figure is the forward movement, the sense of life, the fact that nothing stands still."

== History ==
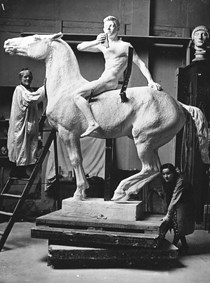
Anne Marie Carl-Nielsen and Pegasus – first model of her Carl Nielsen monument in her studio in Civiletatens Materialgård

Carl Nielsen died on 3 October 1931. The monument was a donation from the Committee for the Creation of a Monument to the Composer Carl Nielsen and the Foundation for the Advancement of Artistic Purposes (Fonden til kunstneriske Formaals Fremme).

Anne Marie Carl-Nielsen was commissioned to design the monument. She worked on it in her studio in Civiletatens Materialgård at Frederiksholms Kanal 26. She wrote: "I wanted to take the winged horse, eternal symbol of poetry, and place a musician on its back. He was to sit there between the rushing wings blowing a reed pipe out over Copenhagen". Dispute about her design and a shortfall in funding meant that the monument was delayed and that Anne Marie herself ended up subsidising it. It was finally unveiled on 17 December 1939.
