= Equestrian statue of Frederick VII =

Equestrian statue by Hermann Wilhelm Bissen

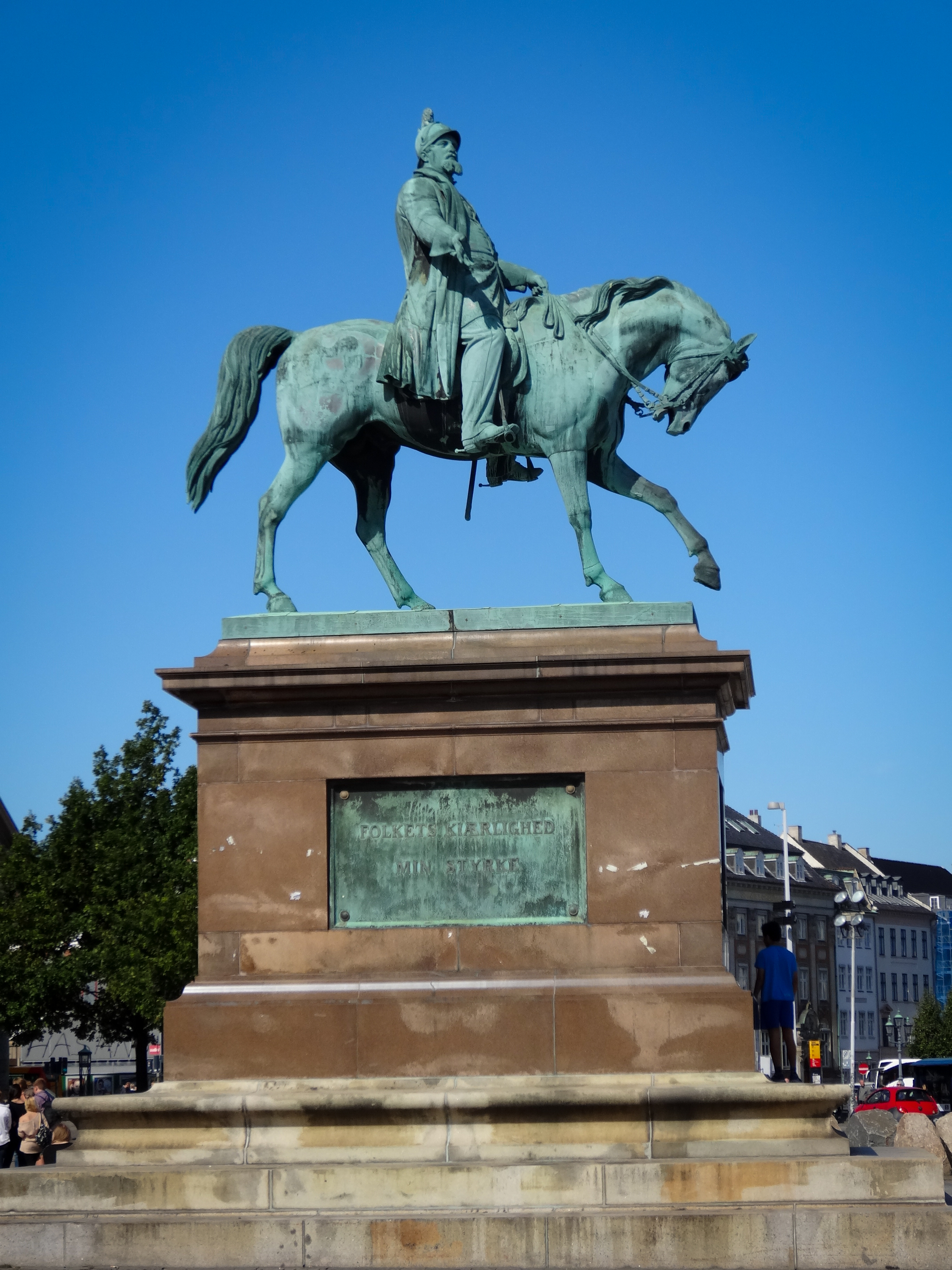
- Equestrian bronze statue of King Frederik VII in front of Christiansborg
- Artist: Herman Wilhelm Bissen
- Year: 1873
- Medium: Bronze
- Subject: Frederick VII on Horseback
- Location: Copenhagen

The Equestrian statue of Frederick VII in front of Christiansborg on Slotsholmen in Copenhagen, Denmark, was modelled by Herman Wilhelm Bissen and completed posthumously by his son Vilhelm Bissen in 1873. It was created to commemorate King Frederick's central role in Denmark's transition from absolute to constitutional monarchy.

== Description ==
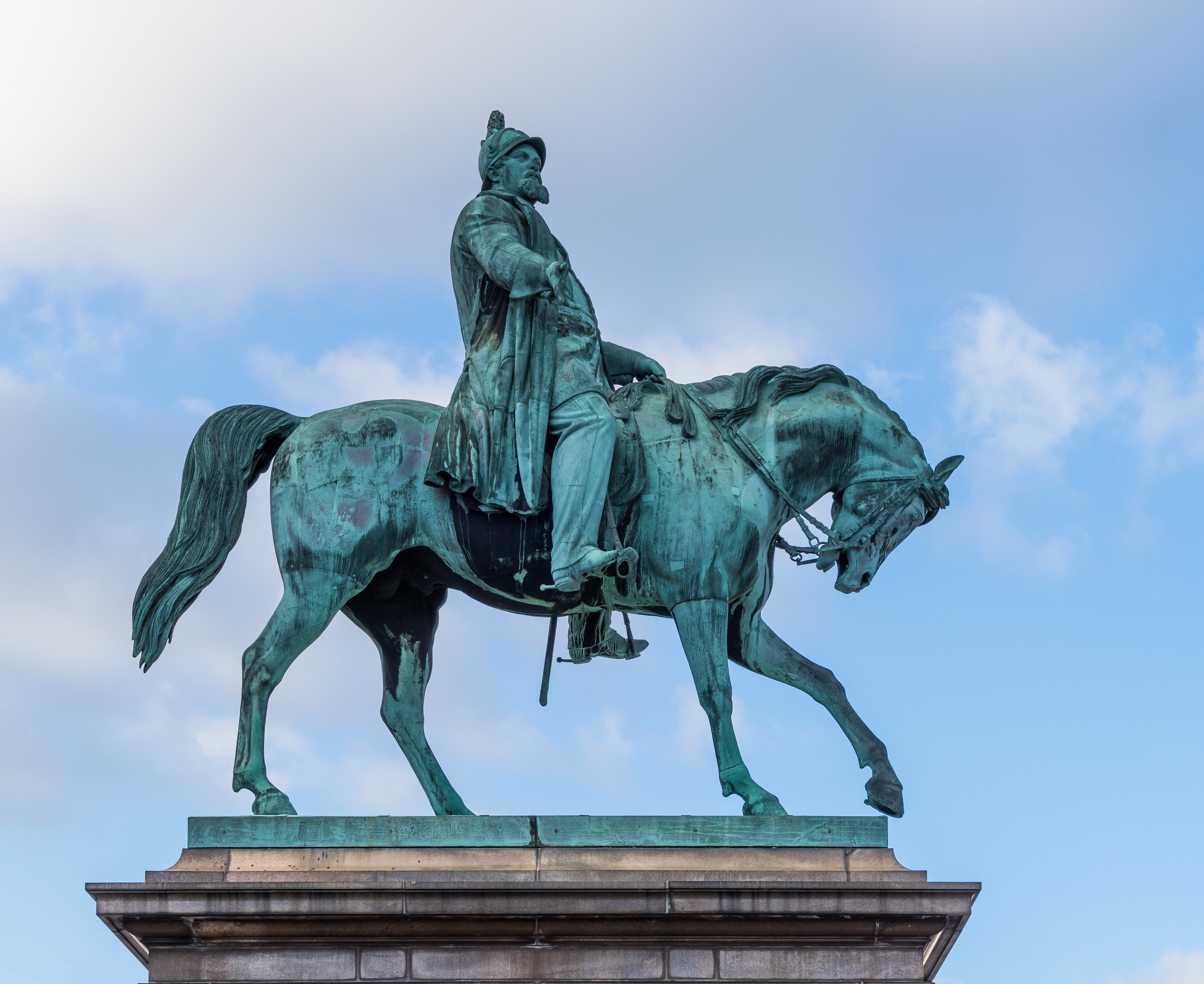
Closeup of the statue

The statue shows Frederik VII of Denmark on horseback, wearing a long coat.

The granite plinth is decorated with bronze plaques on all sides. That on the front features a gilt oak wreath and the inscription "5/IUNI/1849" in gilt letters. The bronze plate on the left hand side features Frederik VII's motto: "FOLKETS KIÆRLIGHED/MIN STYRKE" (The people's love, my strength). The inscription on the right hand side reads "FREDERIK D: SYVENDE/GRUNDLOVENS GIVER." (Frederik the Seventh, granter of the constitution). The inscription on the rear side reads "FØDT 1808./KONGE 1848./DØD 1863.” (Born 1808, King 1848, died 1863).

== History ==
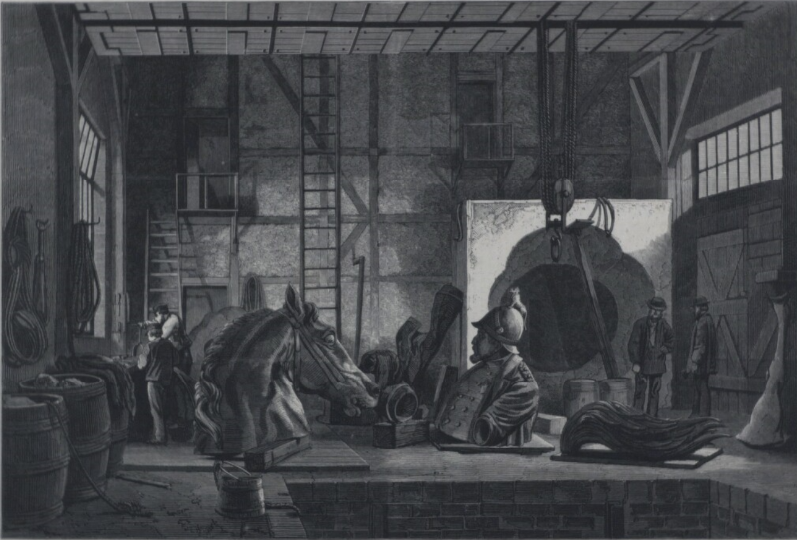
Bissen's studio in Civiletatens Materialgård with parts of the statue

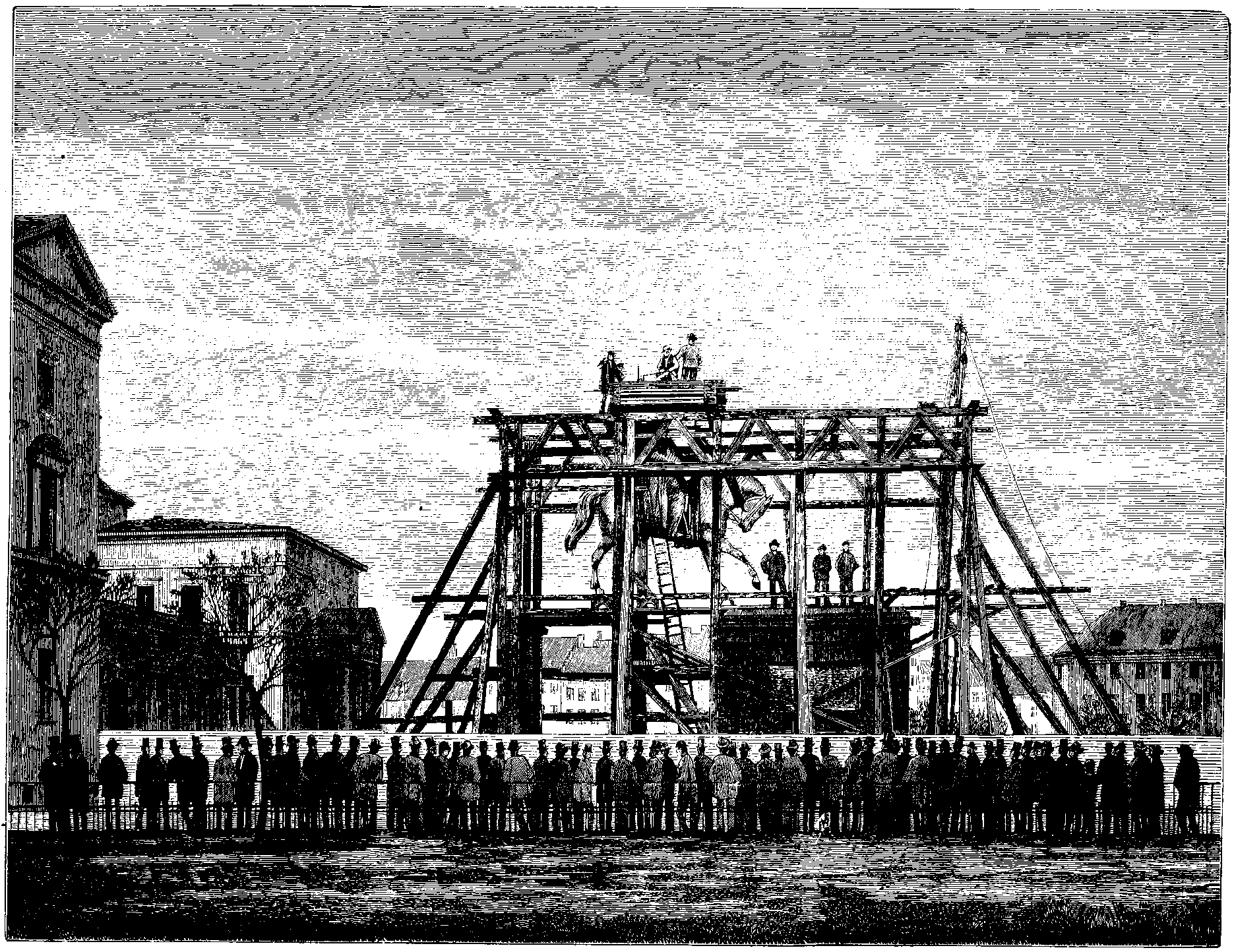
The monument under construction in 1873, illustration from Illustreret Tidende

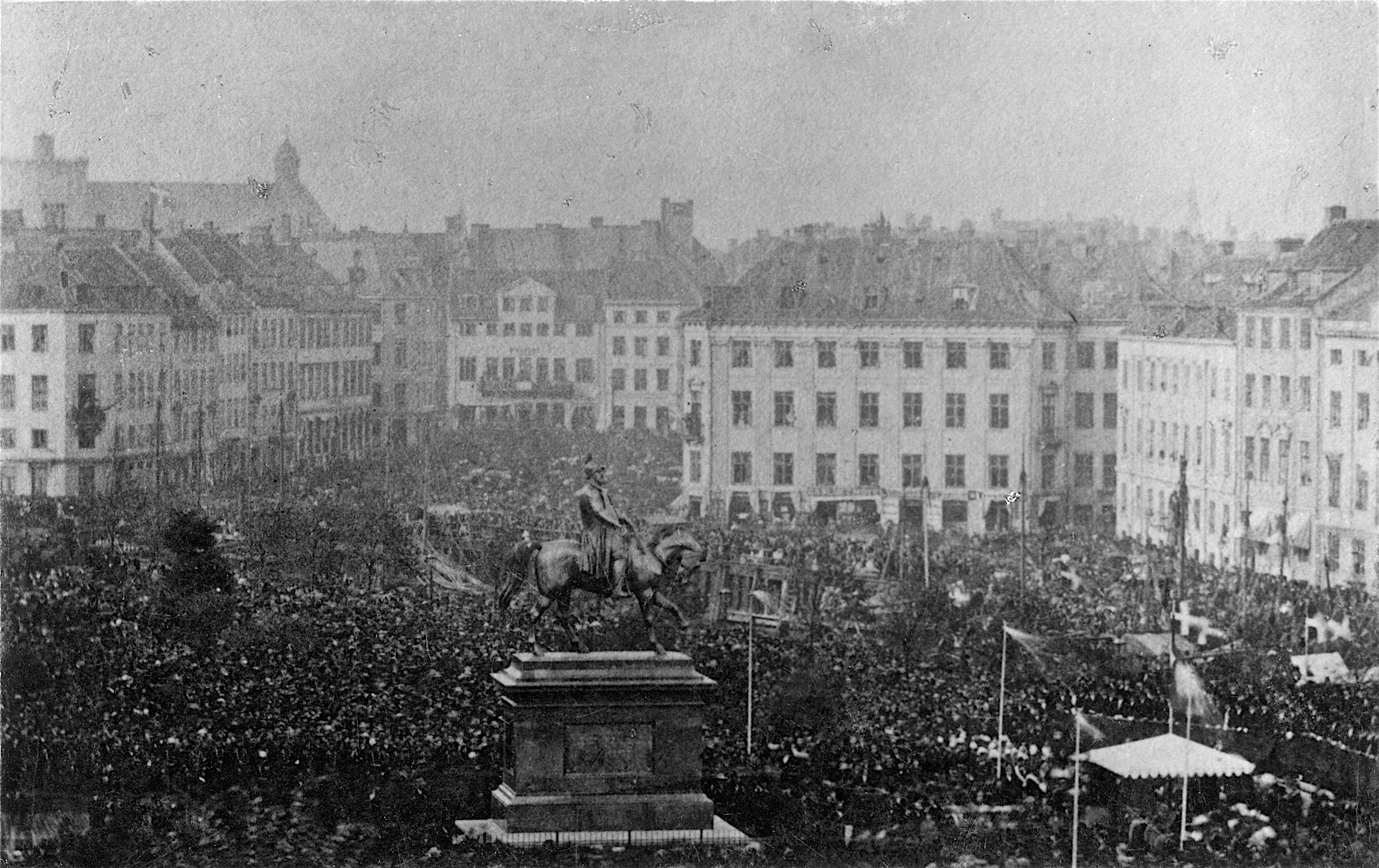
The statue in 1873 with the second Christiansborg Palace as a backdrop

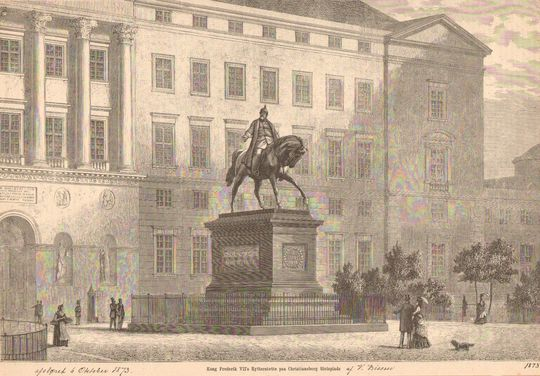
The statue in 1873 with the second Christiansborg Palace as a backdrop

When crown prince Frederick ascended to the Danish throne in 1848, following the death of his father, he became the ninth absolute monarch of Denmark since 1660. On 21 March 1848, a demonstration with 10,000 people gathered on the plaza in front of Christiansborg Palace, demanding a new government and democratic reforms. The king immediately agreed and the Constitution of Denmark was signed on 5 June 1849.

The statue was created on the initiative of a committee chaired by Carl Ploug to commemorate the monarch's role in ensuring Denmark's transition from absolute to constitutional monarchy. It was financed through contributions from the Danish state, the City of Copenhagen and private donations. Herman Wilhelm Bissen was charged with the design of the statue which was later completed by his son Vilhelm Bissen. It was cast by Parisian bronze casters at Vilhelm Bissen's workshop at Carlsberg. The monument was unveiled on 6 October 1873. It survived the fire of the second Christiansborg Palace in 1884.

== See also ==
- List of public art in Copenhagen
- Equestrian statue of Christian IX
