= Mermaid (Carl-Nielsen) =

1921 bronze sculpture by Anne Marie Carl-Nielsen

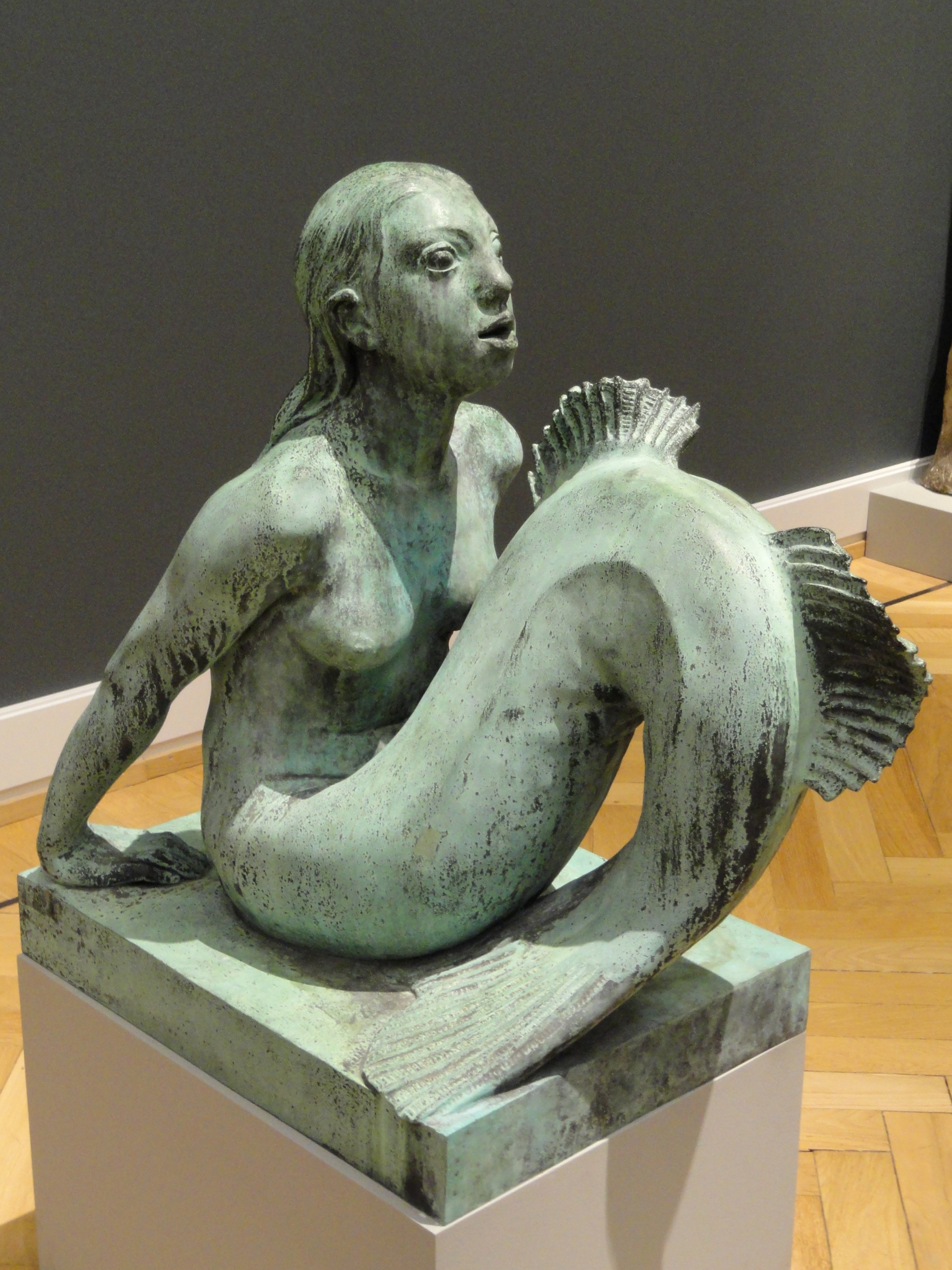
- Artist: Anne Marie Carl-Nielsen
- Year: 1921
- Type: bronze
- Dimensions: 77 cm × 44 cm × 84 cm (30 in × 17 in × 33 in)
- Location: Danish National Gallery

Mermaid (Danish: Havfrue) is a bronze sculpture designed by the Danish sculptor Anne Marie Carl-Nielsen, depicting a mermaid. The original bronze cast from 1921 is on display in the Danish National Gallery while another cast was installed at Christians Brygge outside the Royal Danish Library in Copenhagen in 2009. The original plaster model is owned by the Carl Nielsen Museum and is on display in the Funen Art Museum in Odense. Carl-Nielsen depicts her mermaid in a more dramatic pose than that of Edvard Eriksen's far more famous and nine years older Little Mermaid at Copenhagen's Langelinie promenade.

== History ==
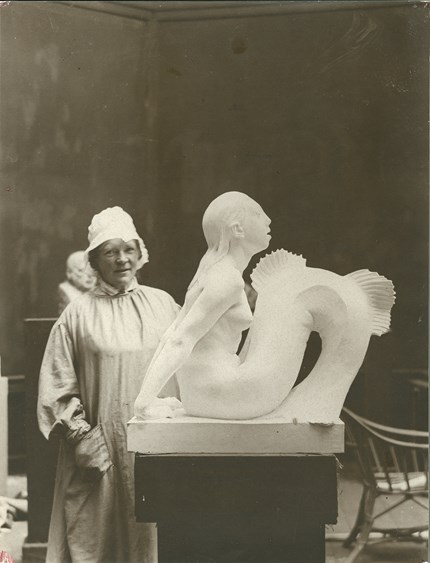
Anne Marie Carl-Nielsen with the plaster model

Little is known about the creation of the sculpture. One of Carl-Nielsen's sketchbooks contains some sketches of mermaids but it is not known when they were made or if it was in connection with the creation of the mermaid sculpture. It is unknown if she was inspired by Hans Christian Andersen's fairytale "The Little Mermaid" in the same way as other Danish artists such as Edvard Eriksen with his Little Mermaid and the painter Elisabeth Jerichau-Baumann, but she was familiar with mythological subjects. In 1937, she made a statue of The Little Match Girl.

The plaster model was created by Anne Marie Carl-Nielsen in 1921. The work was exhibited at Den Frie Udstilling in Copenhagen in 1921 and the Danish National Gallery subsequently purchased the bronze cast for DKK 4,500. The sculpture was placed in Østre Anlæg to the rear of the museum but was put on storage in 1970

== Outdoor sculpture in Copenhagen ==
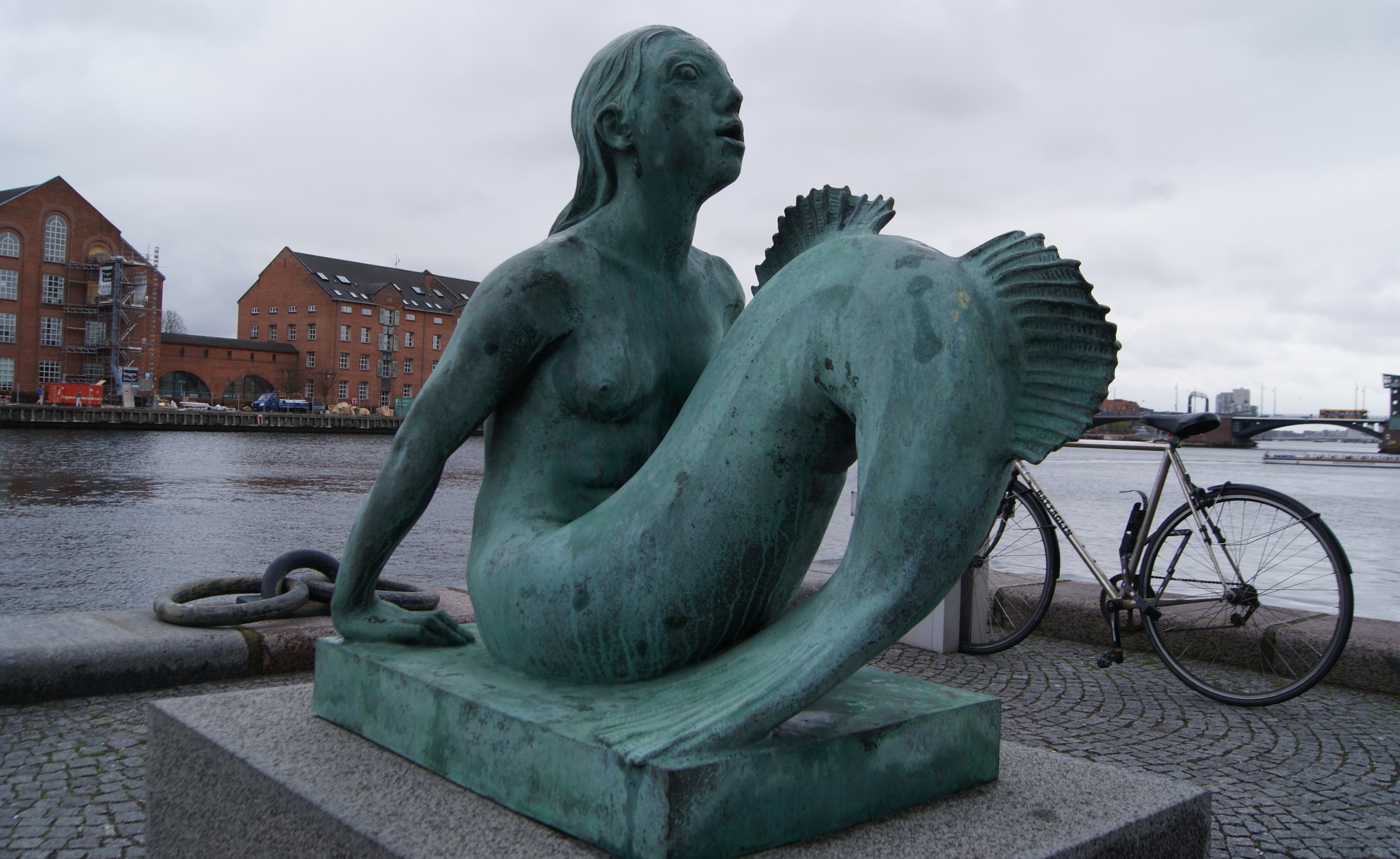
The Mermaid sculpture outside the Black Diamond

A bronze cast of the sculpture was unveiled on the waterfront outside the Black Diamond in Copenhagen on 5 May 2009. The location was once known as the Mermaid Bank. The cast was a gift to the Royal Danish Library from the Carl Nielsen and Anne Marie Carl-Nielsen Foundation. The Royal Danish Library contains all Carl Nielsen's musical scores and letters including the almost 500 letters from his wife Anne Marie.

== Description ==
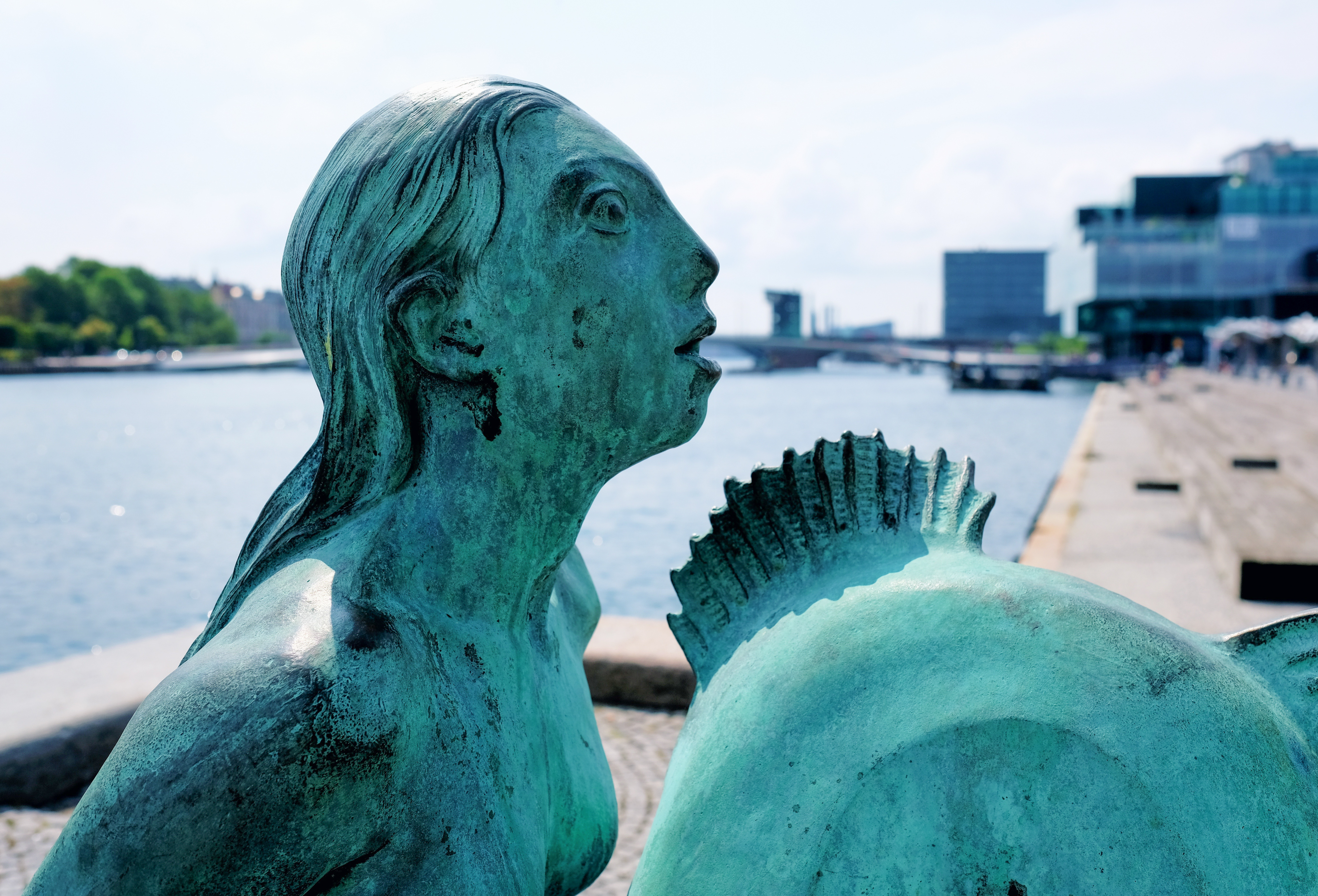
Detail

Carl-Nielsen's mermaid is, with her projecting fins, flat nose and fish-like mouth, more creature and less human than Edvard Eriksen's nine years older Little Mermaid. She is also depicted in a more dynamic pose and with a more dramatic expression than that of Eriksen's more famous mermaid: She has a terrified look in her eyes and appears to have just come out of the water, gasping for breath and with hair dripping with water. The Carl Nielsen specialist John Fellow has suggested that the mermaid's tormented facial expression is Anne Marie Carl-Nielsen's comment to her difficult marriage and her husband's repeated infidelity. He has pointed out that the mermaid sculpture was the only work that she created during this difficult period that was not a commission created out of economic necessity. It has also been suggested that the sculpture symbolizes the transition from girl to woman.

== See also ==
- Sculpture of Denmark
