= Equestrian statue of Christian IX, Copenhagen =

Christian IX
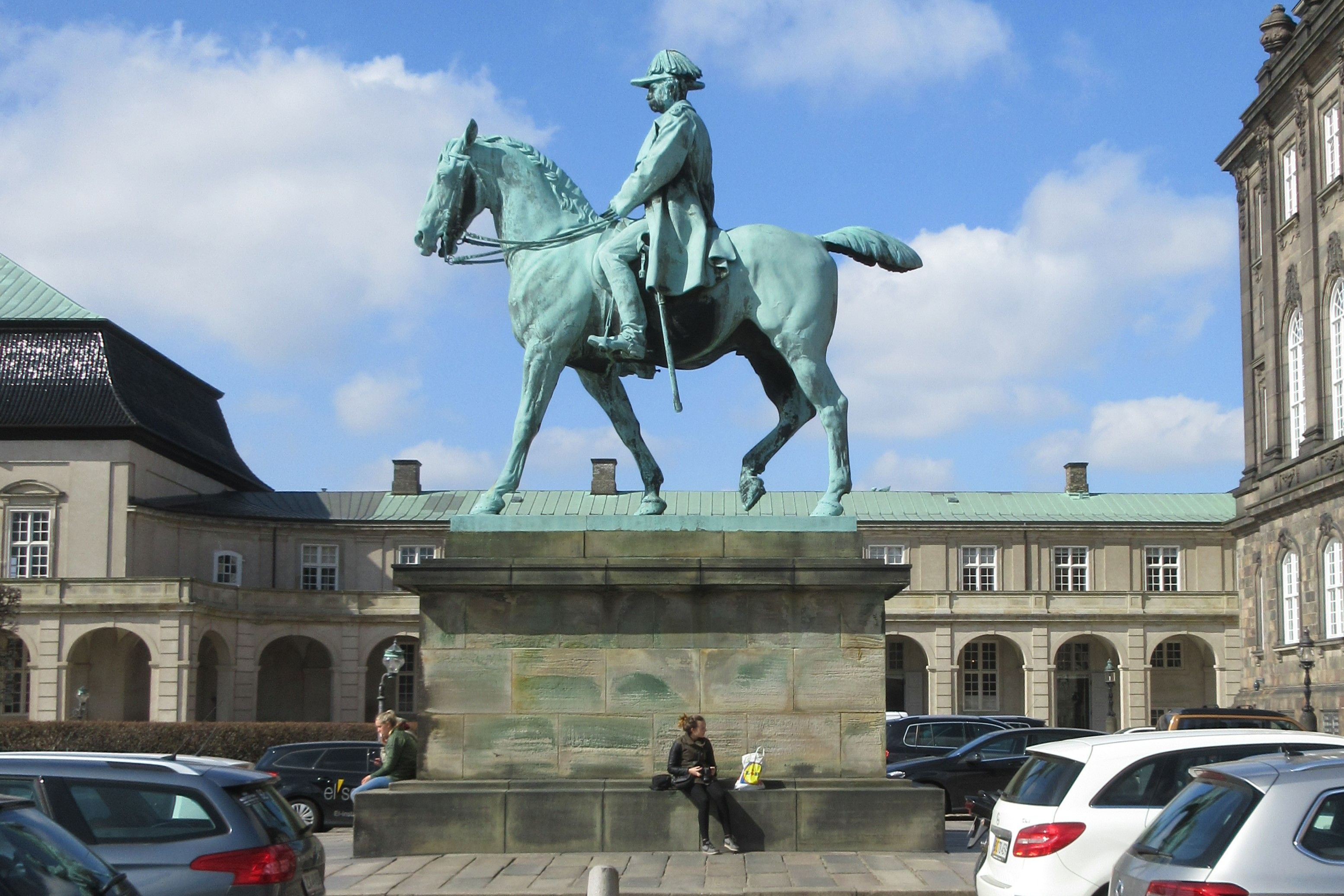
- The statue in 2018
- Artist: Anne Marie Carl-Nielsen
- Year: 1927; 99 years ago
- Type: Bronze equestrian statue
- Location: Copenhagen, Denmark

The equestrian statue of Christian IX, overlooking Christiansborg Ridebane on Slotsholmen in Copenhagen, Denmark, was created by Anne Marie Carl-Nielsen. Unveiled in 1927, it was the first equestrian statue of a monarch created by a woman sculptor.

== Description ==
The statue shows Christian IX of Denmark on horseback, holding the reins of the horse in his left hand.

== History ==
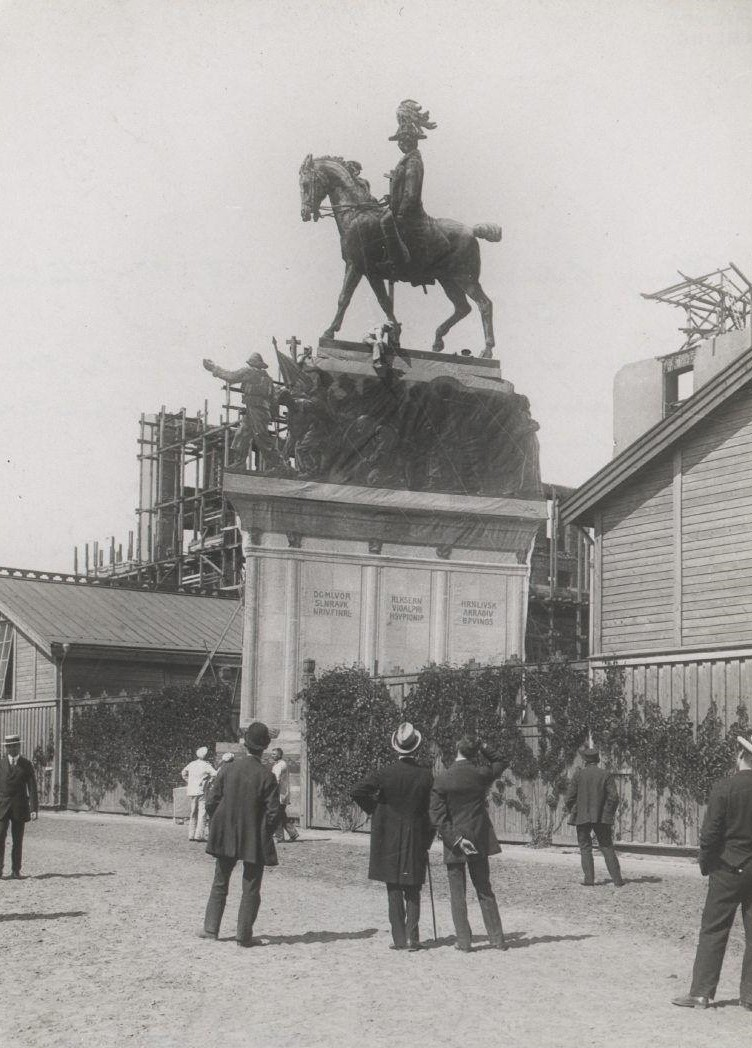
The mock-up that was installed at the site in 1911

Construction of the third and current Christiansborg Palace began in 1907 after the second Christiansborg Palace had been destroyed in a fire in 1884. Following Christian IX's death on 29 January 1906, it was decided to commemorate him with an equestrian statue that would complement the equestrian statue of Frederick VII in front of the palace. An invited competition held in 1908 was won by Anne Marie Carl-Nielsen. She found the model for the horse in Hannover, Germany. A wooden mockup of the sculpture was installed at Christiansborg Ridebane in 1911.

The statue was cast in royal bronze caster Carl and Poul Lauritz Rasmussen's foundry in Nørrebro. The plinth was designed by the architect Andreas Clemmesen and executed in stone carver Scheller's workshop. The monument was unveiled on 15 November 1927.
