= Anne Marie Carl-Nielsen =

Danish sculptor (1863–1945)

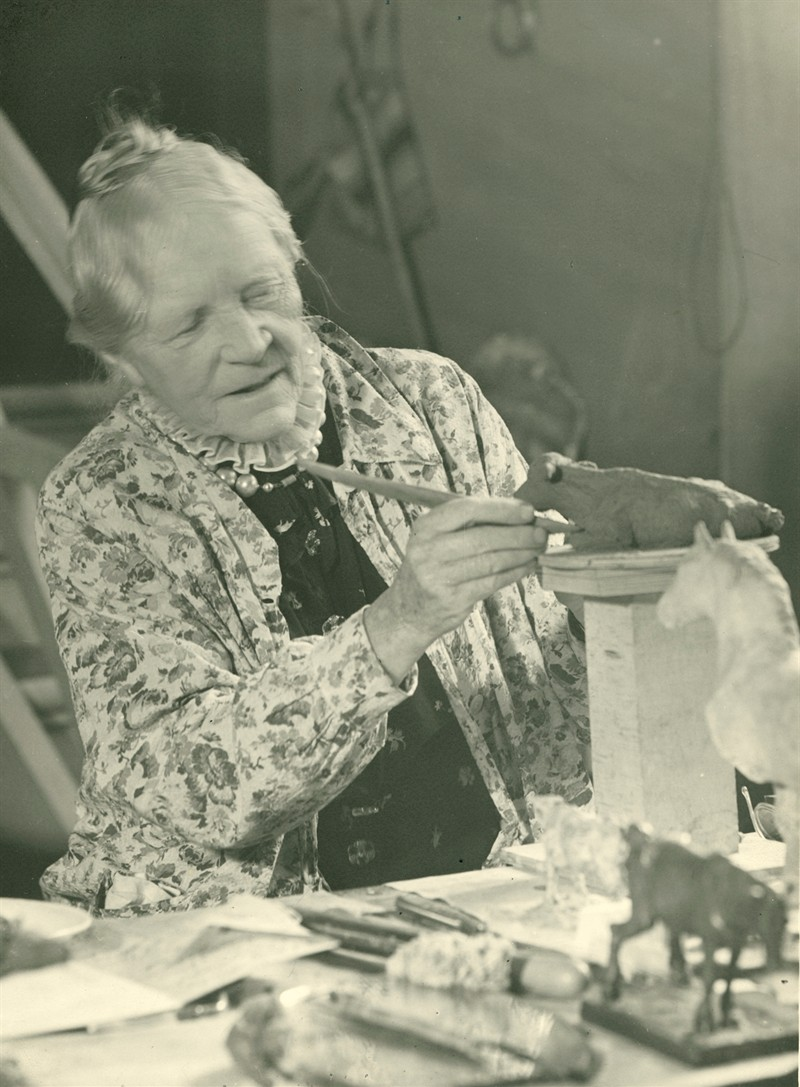
- Anne Marie Carl-Nielsen working on a sculpture
- Born: Anne Marie Brodersen; 21 June 1863; Sønder Stenderup, Denmark
- Died: 21 February 1945 (aged 81); Copenhagen, Denmark
- Known for: Sculpture
- Notable work: Equestrian statue of Christian IX, Copenhagen; Mermaid, Copenhagen; Doors of Ribe Cathedral
- Awards: Ingenio et Arti, 1927; Thorvaldsen Medal, 1932

Signature
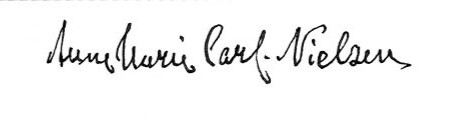

Anne Marie Carl-Nielsen (born Anne Marie Brodersen; 21 June 1863 – 21 February 1945) was a Danish sculptor. Her preferred themes were domestic animals and people, with an intense, naturalistic portrayal of movements and sentiments. She also depicted themes from Nordic mythology. She was "one of the first women to be taken seriously as a sculptor," a trend-setter in Danish art for most of her life. She was married to the Danish composer Carl Nielsen.

== Early life ==
Brodersen was born on Thygesminde, a large farm estate in South Stenderup, near Kolding. Her father Povl Julius Brodersen served in the German Dragoons before purchasing the farm. He married Friderikke Johanne Kirstine Gilling, who was his housekeeper. The Brodersens were "successful, daring people", some of the first to import livestock directly from England. Anne Marie was thus familiar with farming and animals from an early age.

Her first work, a small sheep using clay from the farm garden, dates from 1875. From 1881 to 1882, she trained at schools for carving and for drawing and applied art. She also studied with sculptor August Saabye and painters Jørgen Roed and Henrik Olrik. She first exhibited work at Charlottenborg Spring Exhibition in 1884. She was awarded first prize in Neuhausen's competition in 1887 for a fountain group Thor with the Midgard Serpent (Thor med Midgaardsormen) which she completed in Saabye's studio.

In 1889, she was awarded a scholarship from the Art School for Women (Kunstskolen for Kvinder). She travelled to the Netherlands, Belgium and Paris where she visited the Exposition Universelle, entering two calf figurines (Note: Mogensen (1992b, pp. 96–97) illustrates these figurines.) and winning a bronze medal. One of the figurines sold for Kr 700 (£35 (Note: Converting at a rate of Kr 20 = £1.)) and her father said "That is more than I get for my calves." She received a travel grant from the Academy of Fine Arts (Kunstakademiet) in 1890 to visit Paris again (and perhaps Italy).

Now in Paris, on 2 March 1891, Brodersen met Danish composer Carl Nielsen. (Note: Lawson (1997, pp. 56–57) quotes Carl Nielsen's diary from 2 March 1891: "Miss Brodersen is actually quite pretty", together with a contemporary photograph of the young artist (see also Odense City Museums' picture gallery.)) The couple became inseparable and on 20 March considered themselves married, celebrating with a party on 10 April and agreeing to wed formally once papers arrived from Denmark. They were married on 10 May in St Mark's English Church, Florence, having decided to visit Italy together before returning to Denmark, and Anne Marie took the family name Carl-Nielsen. Her daughter Irmelin Johanne Carl-Nielsen was born on 9 December. Although she had already overcome parental opposition to start her studies, with her marriage she was to have the freedom she needed to pursue her artistic career, (Note: Mogensen (1992b, p. 95): Ironically, on her arrival in Copenhagen in 1882, Anne Marie had sought to study with sculptor Christian Vilhelm Bissen, but he refused, saying that he did not accept women, they would never amount to anything as they always got married. Disappointed, she then approached August Saabye and became his student. The Nielsen family later moved into Bissen's former home and studio at Frederiksholms Kanal 28A in Civiletatens Materialgård.^{[Frederiksholms Kanal]}) including long stays away from home.

== Recognition ==
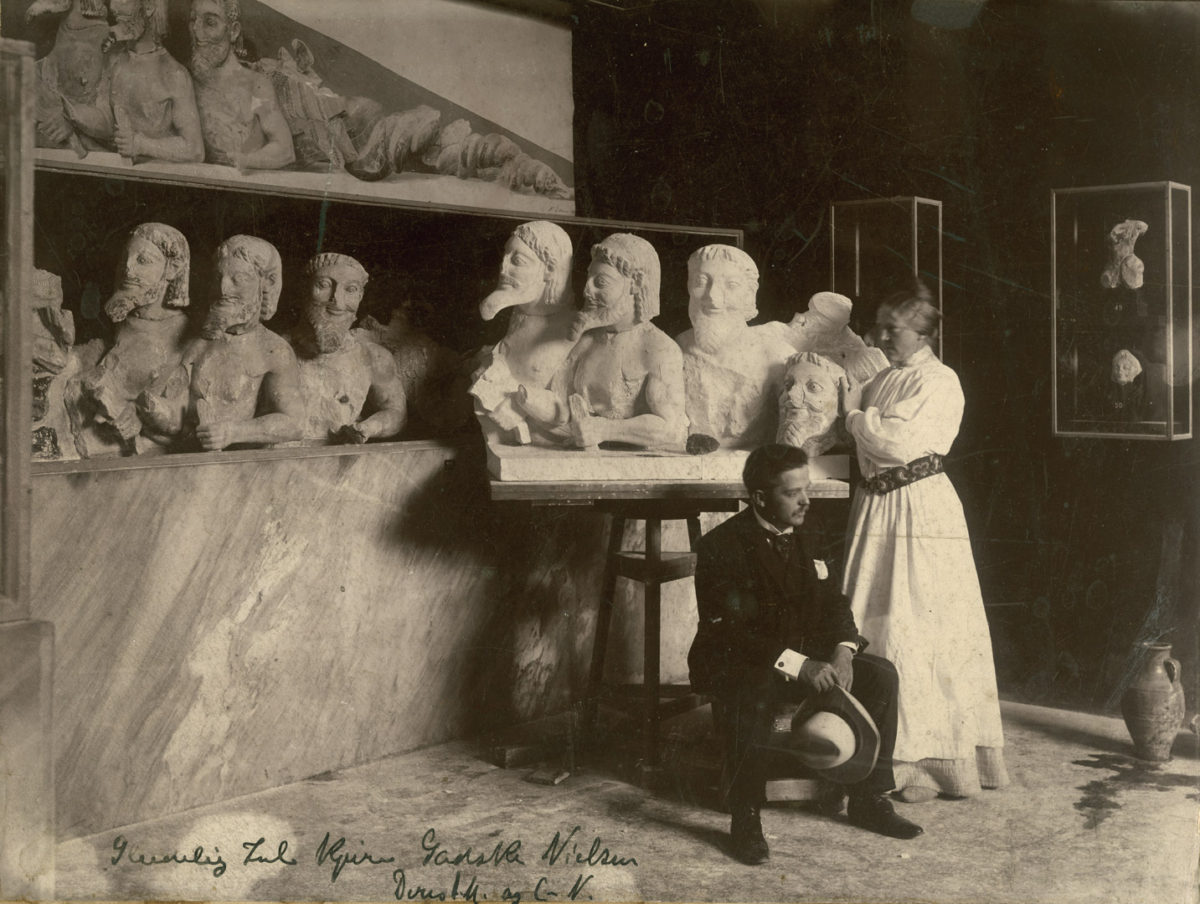
Anne Marie Carl-Nielsen and her husband photographed in front of her Typhon copy in the Acropolis Museum in Athens, 1903.

In 1892, Carl-Nielsen contributed for the first time to the Free Exhibition (Den Frie Udstilling) in Copenhagen. She became a permanent member in 1893. The two calves in bronze were accepted for the 1893 Chicago World's Fair. Her second daughter, Anne Marie Frederikke Carl-Nielsen (known as Søs – Sister) and son Hans Børge Carl-Nielsen were born on 4 March 1893 and 5 September 1895. Her father died on 14 September 1899.

She received the Anckerske Grant in 1903, undertaking a prolonged journey with her husband to Athens and Constantinople. Before they left they engaged as housekeeper Maren Hansen, who worked "with exceptional devotion", staying with the family until her death in 1946 and catering for the artistic needs of the parents. In Athens, Anne Marie copied the Poros Group from the gable (Note: The poros stone groups are mentioned in Richardson (1911, pp. 56–58): "Several gable groups in poros have been put together out of many fragments with striking results. ... The important groups ... are those now shown to have belonged to the gables of the old pre-Peisistratean Athena temple. Here Herakles appears wrestling with a larger Triton ..." (Peisistratos was ruler of Athens from 561 BCE).) of the Old Temple of Athena.

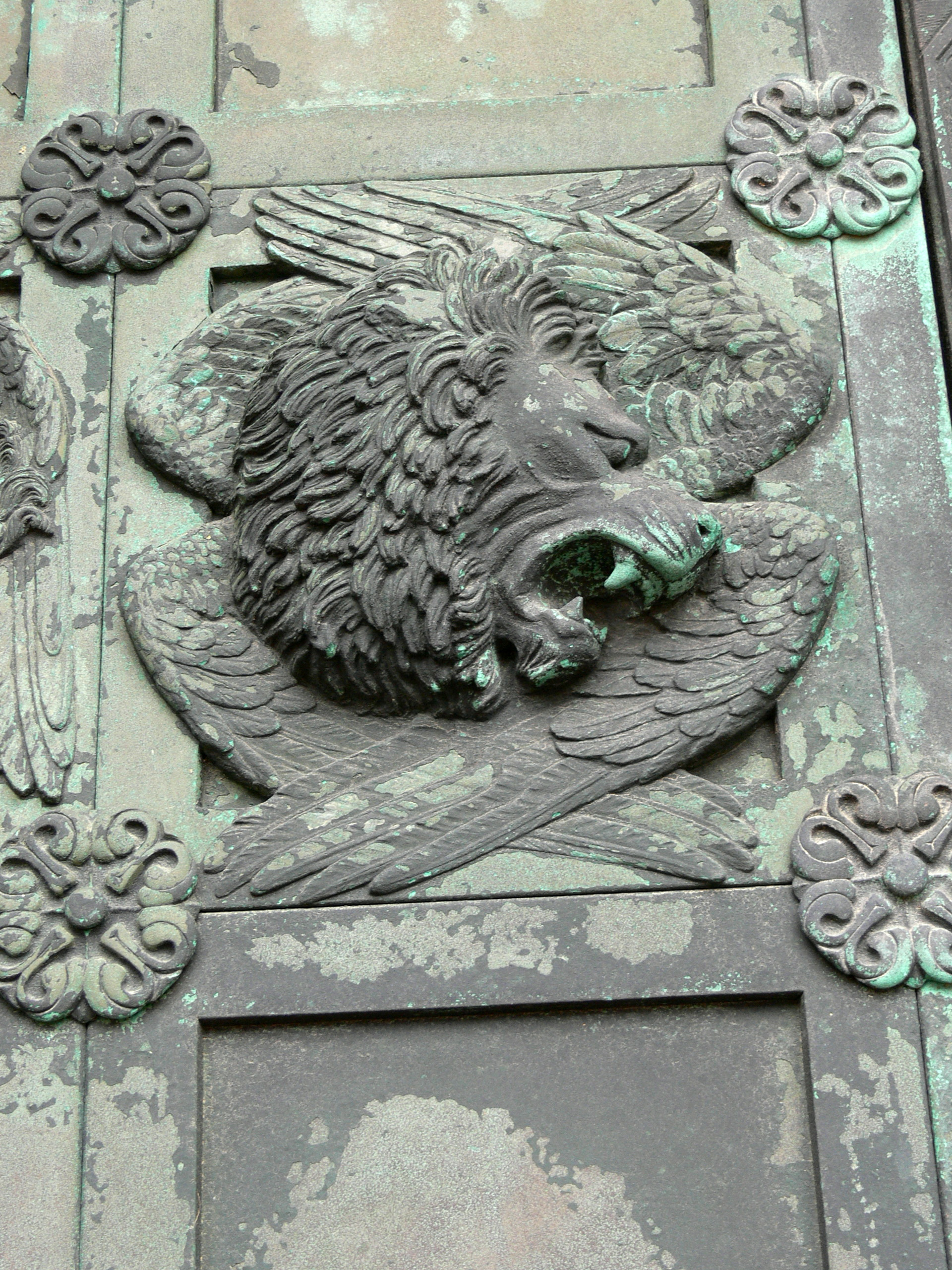
The lion of St Mark from the door of Ribe Cathedral

In 1904, Anne Marie created the three doors of Ribe Cathedral (Ribe Domkirke). Also in 1904, her mother died. In 1907, she shared first prize in a competition for a monument to physician Niels Ryberg Finsen and won first prize in Neuhausen's competition for A Woman Weeding (En Lugekone). She created sketches for six reliefs for the King Steps at Christanborg's Castle (Christianborg Slot).

She was commissioned in 1908 to create an equestrian statue of King Christian IX in Copenhagen—the first woman to receive such a prestigious commission. She was a member of the Academy of Fine Arts' Plenary Group (Kunstakademiets pleanrforsamling) 1912–1914. She created the monument to Queen Dagmar (Dronning Dagmar-monumentet) on Ribe Castle Hill (Ribe Slotsbanke) in 1913.

In 1916 she helped found the Society for Women Artists (Kvindelinge Kunstneres Samfund) with the painter Anna Ancher. Anne Marie's long absences from home to further her career had put a strain on the Nielsens' marriage as early as 1896. They started to discuss separation in 1916, the application for which was approved in 1919, but they reunited in 1922.

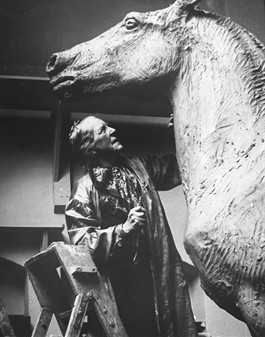
Anne Marie Carl-Nielsen and Pegasus – first model of her Carl Nielsen monument at Grønningen, Copenhagen – in her studio at Frederiksholms Kanal in Copenhagen

The Equestrian Statue of King Christian IX (Rytterstatuen af Christian IX) at the Christiansborg Palace Riding Arena (Christiansborg Slots Ridebane) was unveiled on 15 November 1927. On 17 November, Anne Marie received the Ingenio et Arti gold medal. In 1928, she created a portrait bust of her husband, for which she was awarded the Thorvaldsen Medal (Thorvaldsens medalje) in 1932. She entered the art competitions at the Summer Olympics in 1932, and in 1936 with Nordic Legendary Hero.

In 1933, part of the equestrian monument's pedestal was erected on Skagen as Danish Fisherman and Rescuer (Dansk Fisker og Redningsmand). Anne Marie became a member of the committee for the Anckerske Grant in 1935. She created The Headman (Høvding) and Queen Margrete I (Dronning Margrete I) in 1942. There were several events to celebrate her 80th birthday and she was admitted as an honorary member of the Danish Society of Sculptors (Dansk Billedhugger).

Carl-Nielsen's husband died on 3 October 1931. She completed two monuments in Denmark in his memory: The Herd Boy playing a Wooden Flute (1933) is in Nørre Lyndelse where he was born, and The Young Man playing Pan-pipes on a Wingless Pegasus (1939) in Copenhagen. She said: "What I wanted to show in my figure is the forward movement, the sense of life, the fact that nothing stands still." She died on 21 February 1945. Her funeral was in Copenhagen Cathedral and she is buried in the Vestre Cemetery next to her husband.

== See also ==
- Danish sculpture
