= Carl Nielsen Museum =

Museum in Odense, Denmark

Coordinates: 55°23′58″N 10°23′32″E

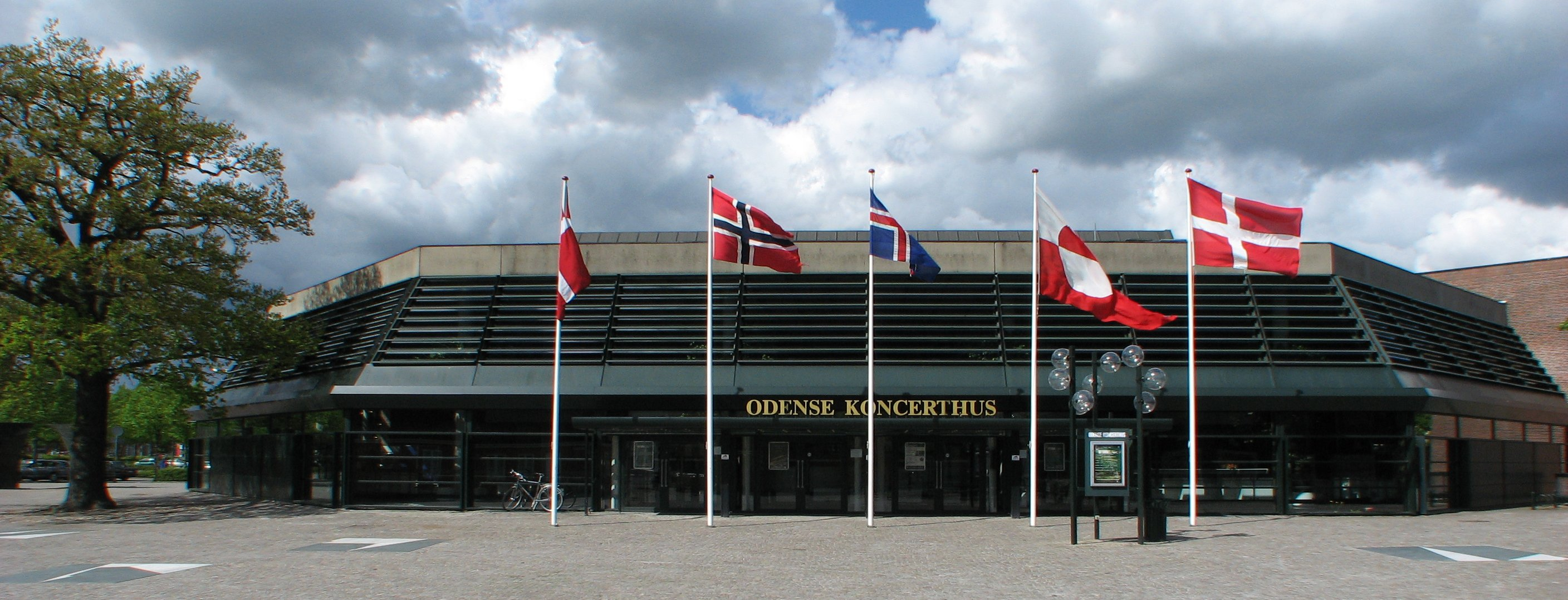
Odense Concert Hall

The Carl Nielsen Museum (Carl Nielsen Museet) is a museum in Odense, Denmark. The museum is located as an extension on the northwestern side of the Odense Concert Hall.

== History ==
The museum operates as a part of the Odense City Museums. The museum is dedicated to the life of Danish composer Carl Nielsen (1865–1931) and his wife, the sculptor Anne Marie Carl-Nielsen (1863–1945). The museum documents his life of Carl Nielsen from his childhood in the town of Nr. Lyndelse, to his career and success on the European music scene, with his violins, his bugle and his grand piano on display, as well as a number of his musical scores, including six symphonies, three concertos, two operas, and chamber music and a great number of songs. The museum also contains an exact reconstruction of two living rooms with the original furniture from Carl and Anne Marie Carl-Nielsen's last home on Frederiksholms Kanal in central Copenhagen.

As of February 2022, the museum is closed "for the time being".

== Gallery ==
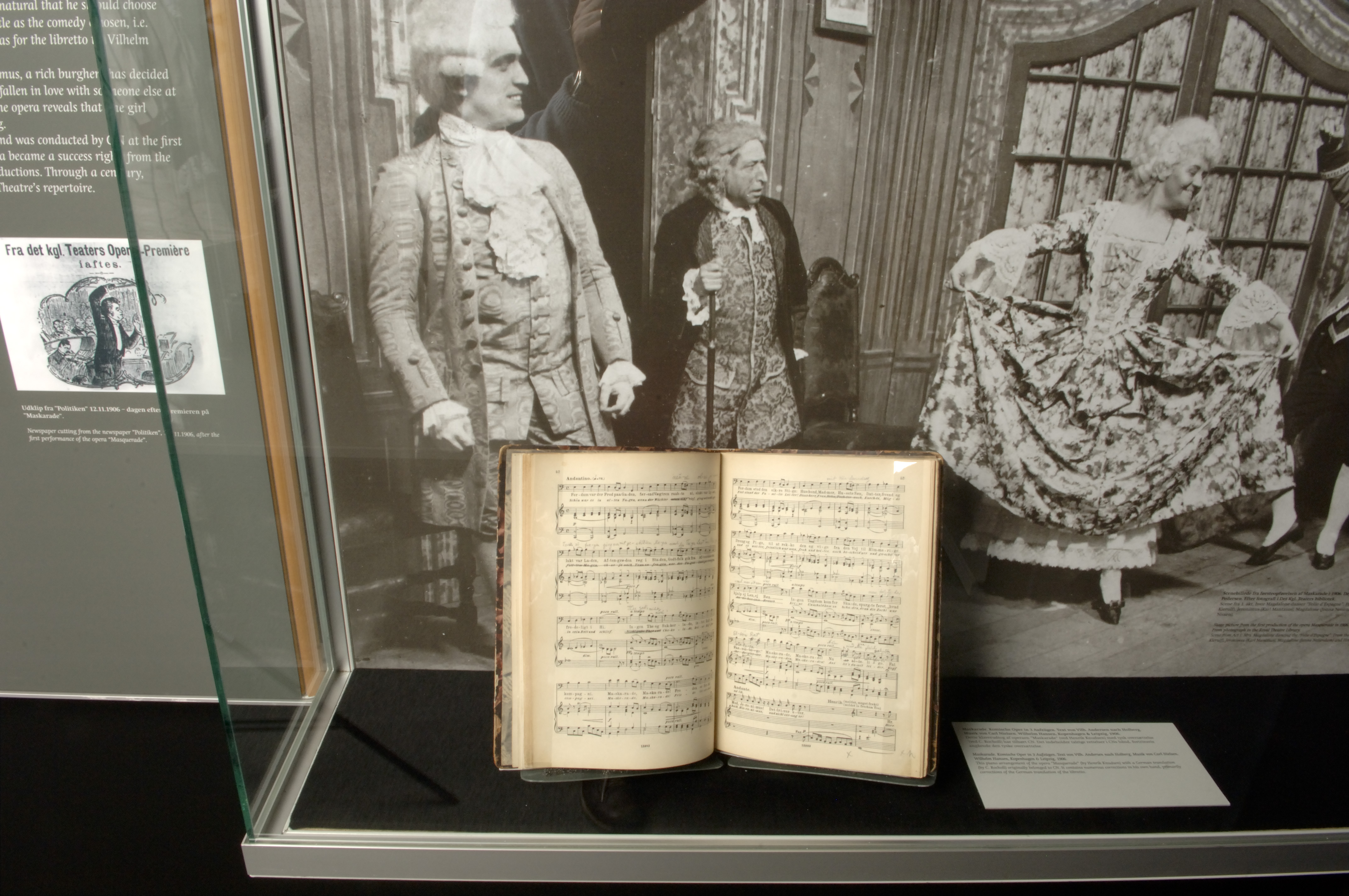

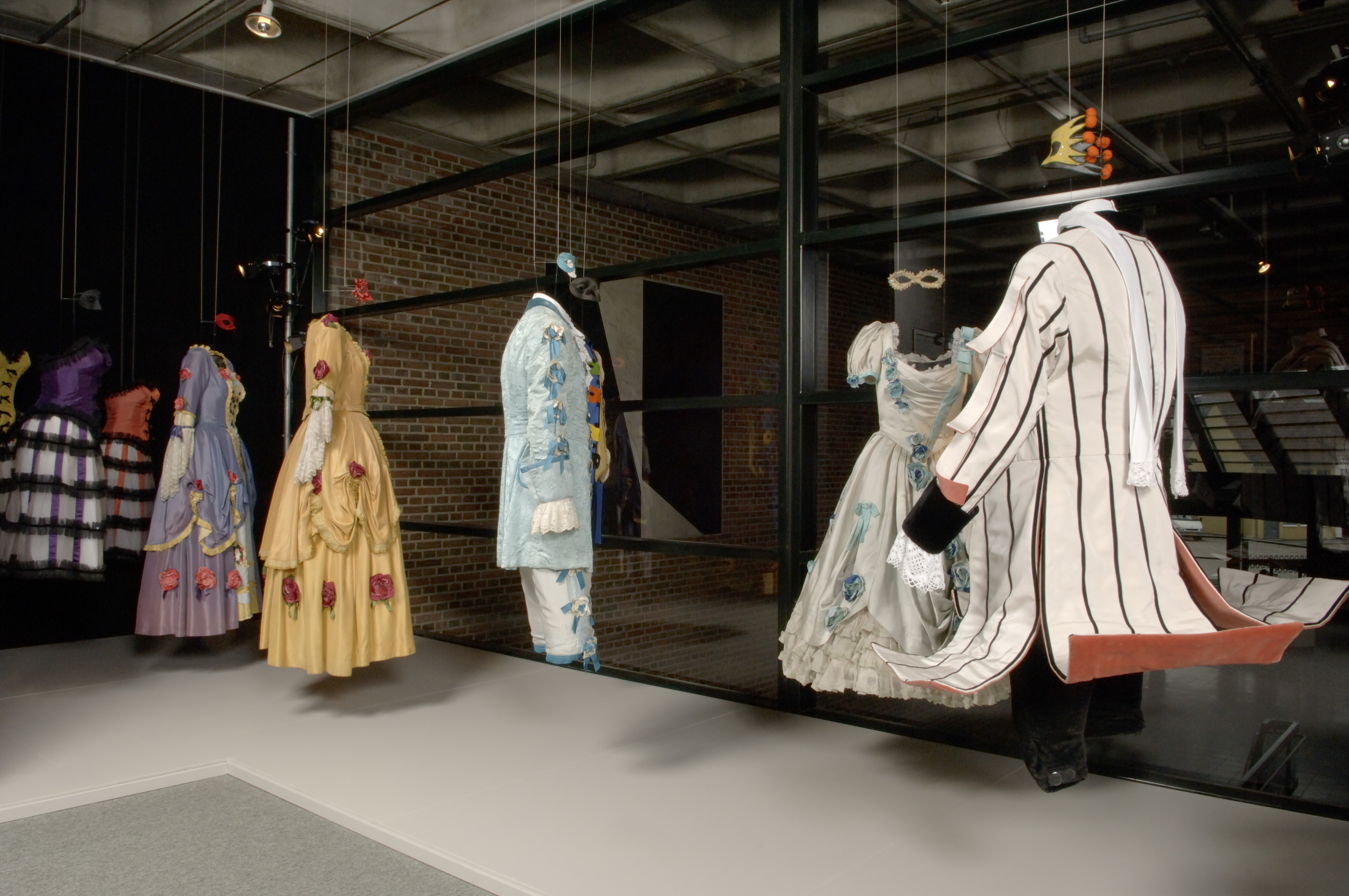

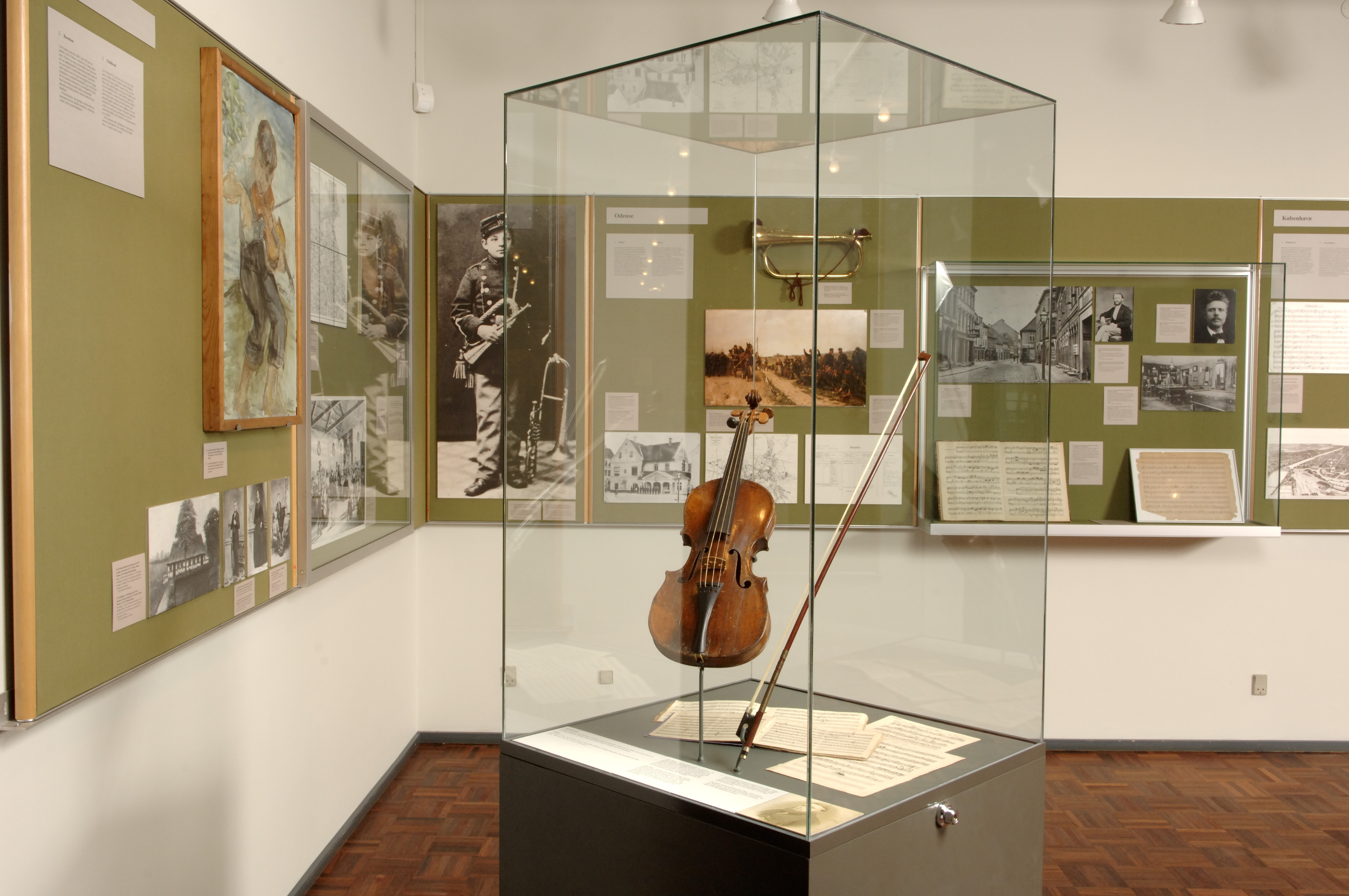

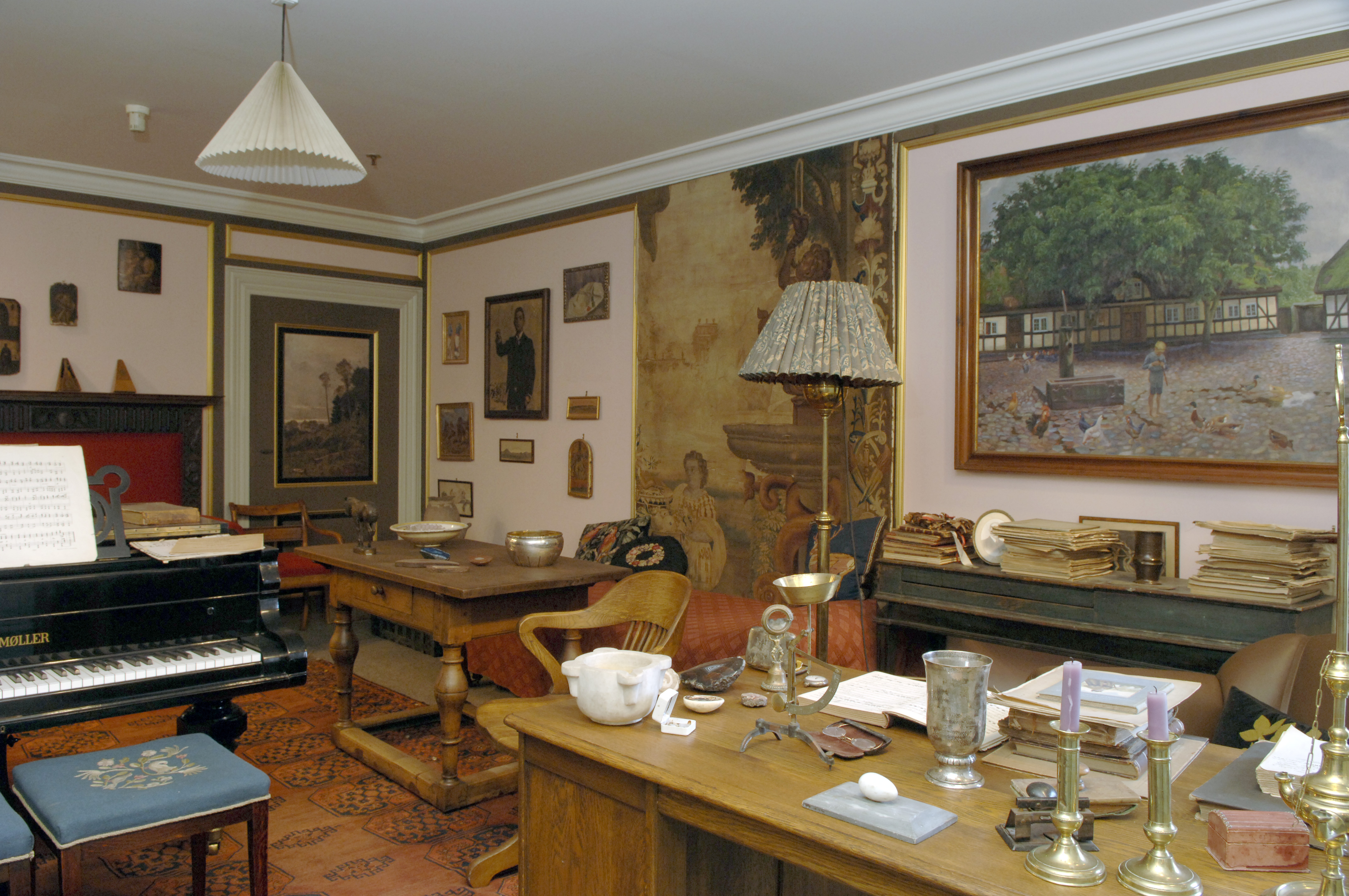

== See also ==
- List of music museums
