= Civiletatens Materialgård =

Building in Copenhagen, Denmark

Coordinates: 55.6732°N 12.5779°E

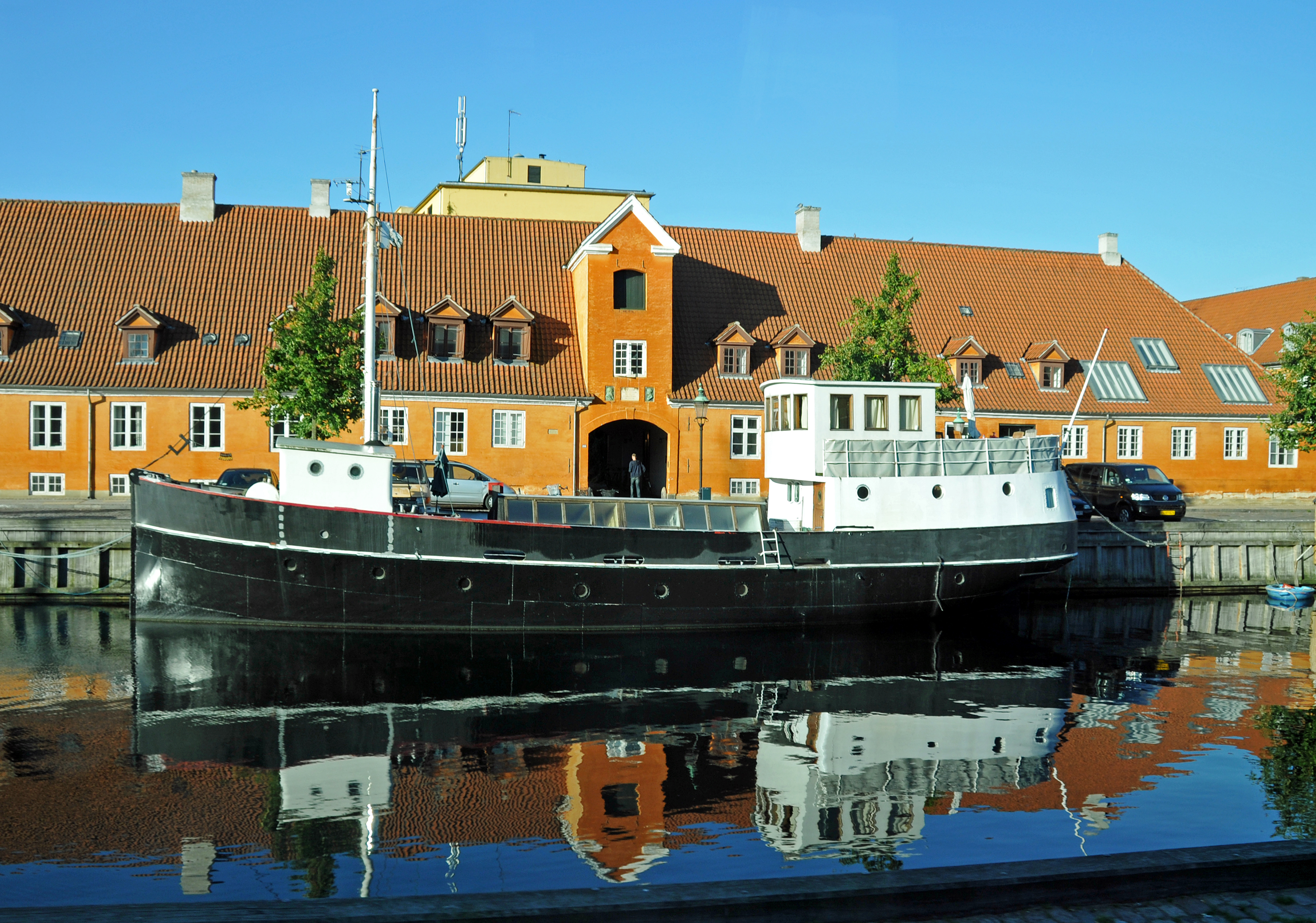
Civiletatens Materialgård viewed across the canal

Civiletatens Materialgård is a former storage facility at Frederiksholm Canal in Copenhagen, Denmark. The complex was used for the storing of materials used for the royal palaces but also has a long history as home and work place for sculptors associated with the Royal Danish Academy of Fine Arts. Together with the adjacent Fæstningens Materialgård, its military counterpart, and the Royal Horse Guards Barracks, it forms a cluster of low, yellow-washed buildings alongside Frederiksholm Canal. It now houses the Art Academy's School of Sculptury as well as residences.

== History ==
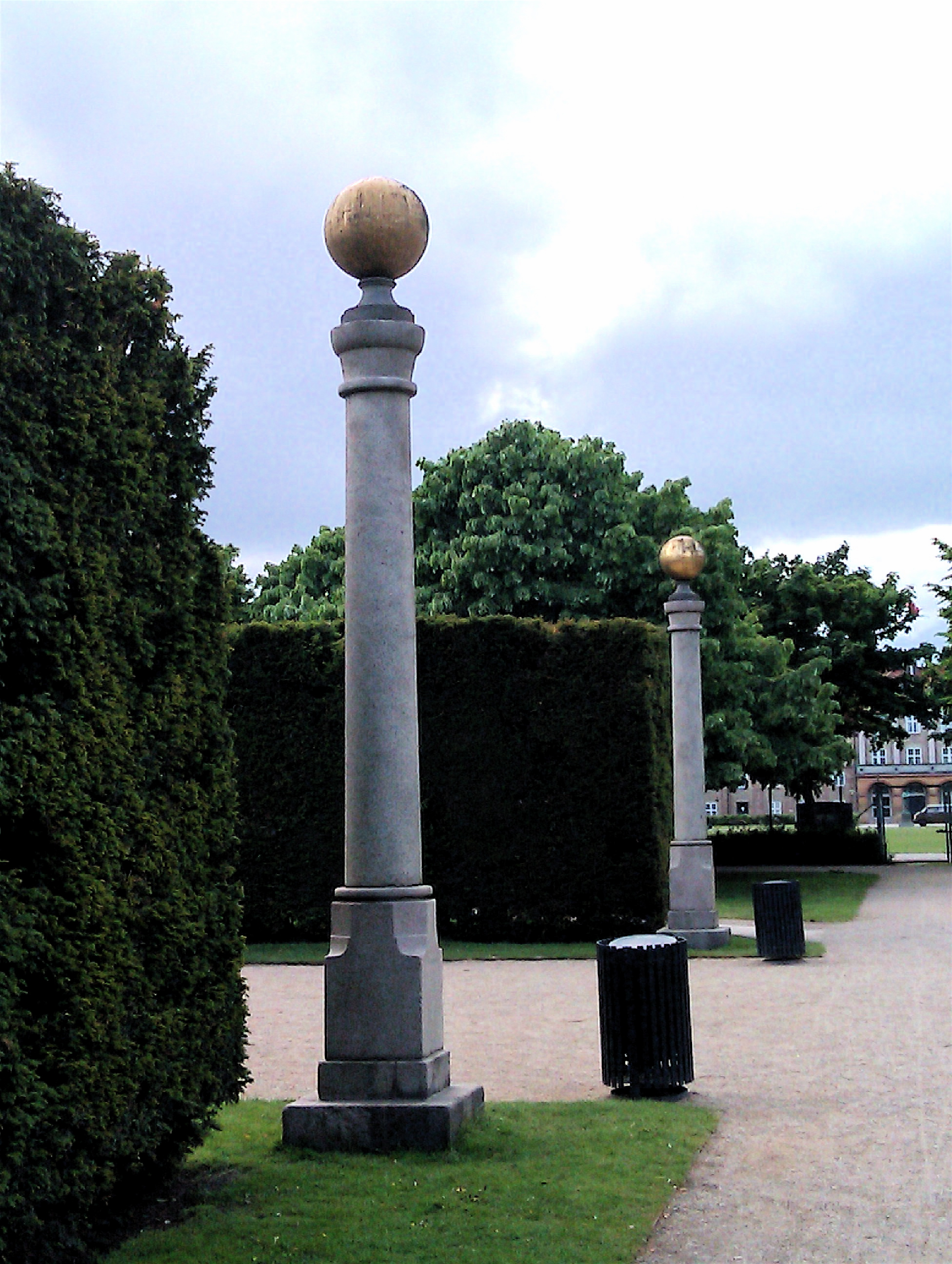
The ring riding columns at Rosenborg Castle Gardens, stored at Civiletatens Materilagård 1823–27

The long main building facing the canal was originally designed by Jacob Fortling. shortly before his death in 1761, and subsequently completed by court architect Georg David Anthon, roughly to that design, in 1771. The complex was used for the storing of materials and building parts and furnishings for the royal palaces and other buildings. The ring riding columns and marble balls in Rosenborg Castle Gardens are examples of artifacts at some point stored at Civiletatens Materialgård.

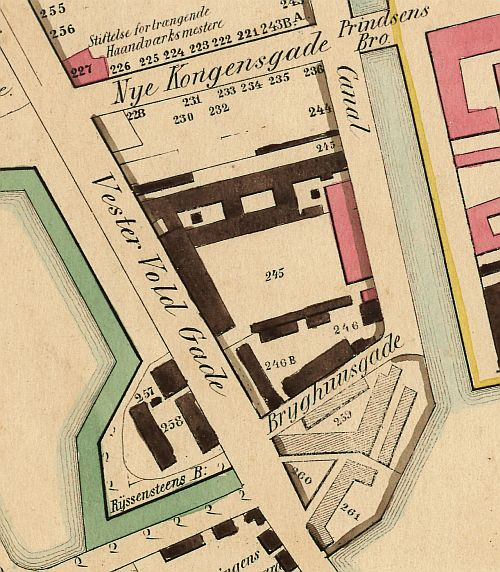
Civiletatens Materialgård seen on a map detail

From its earliest day, the complex also provided accommodation and studio facilities for sculptors at the Royal Art Academy. Most of the profession's work at that time consisted of producing artworks and other decorative features for royal construction projects. Johannes Wiedewelt lived there from its completion in 1771 until 1802 and as did his two sisters and a nephew. Wiedewelt also maintained a studio in the building where he created Frederick V's tomb for Roskilde Cathedral among other works.

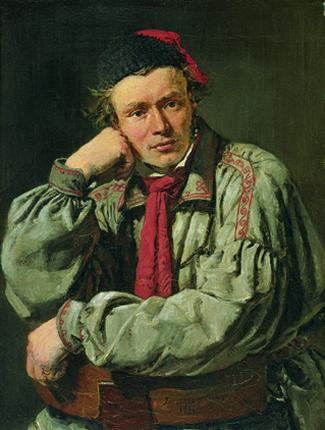
Hermann Ernst Freund painted in 1835, while he lived at Materialgården, by his friend Christian Albrecht Jensen

The residence was then taken over by Nicolai Dajon, from 1818 until 1821 director of the Art Academy, who lived there until his death in 1823. His works executed in the building included his two statues "Bravery" and "Civic Virtue" for the Liberty Column (Frihedsstøtten) at the site as well as Tordenskjold's tomb for Church of Holmen.

After Dajon's death, it would last five years before another artist, Hermann Ernst Freund, was given residency at Materialgården. He had just returned to Copenhagen after nine years in Rome, where he had worked for Bertel Thorvaldsen, and assisted by Georg Hilker and Constantin Hansen he decorated his new home, both interiors and furnishings, in Pompeian Styles. It attracted widespread attention with the city's establishment and led to many commissions for decorations of private homes in the time that followed.

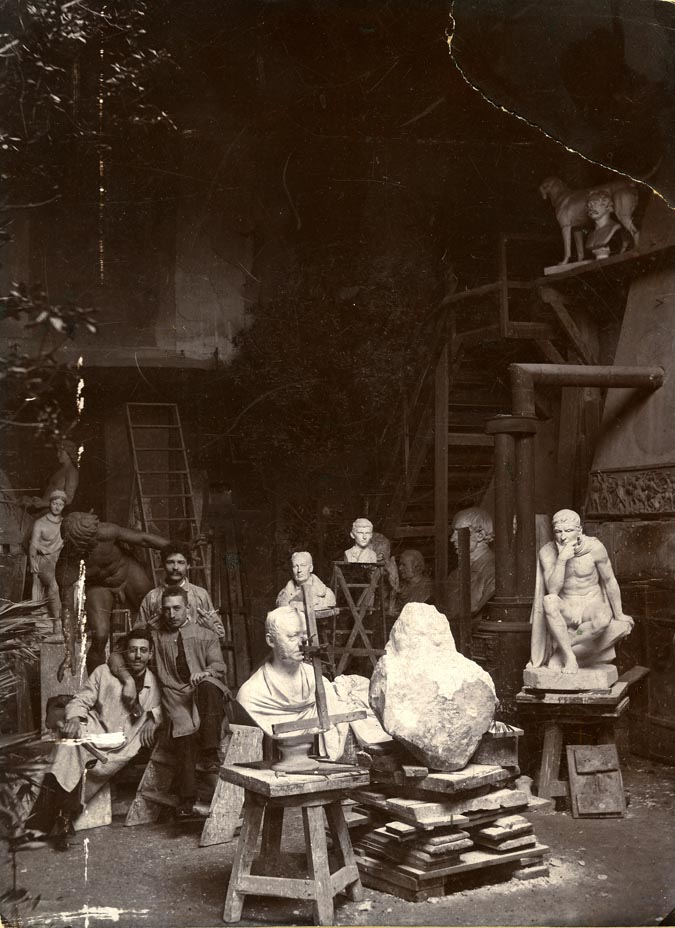
Vilhelm Bissen's studio in 1893

Herman Wilhelm Bissen also maintained a studio in the building, first in the north wing and after Freund's death in 1840 in the south wing. His practically lived at the studio, where he kept a tangle of plants and animals, including lizards, and did most of his works, including the Isted Lion, his Landsoldaten in Fredericia and the equestrian statue of Frederick VII in front of Christiansborg Palace.

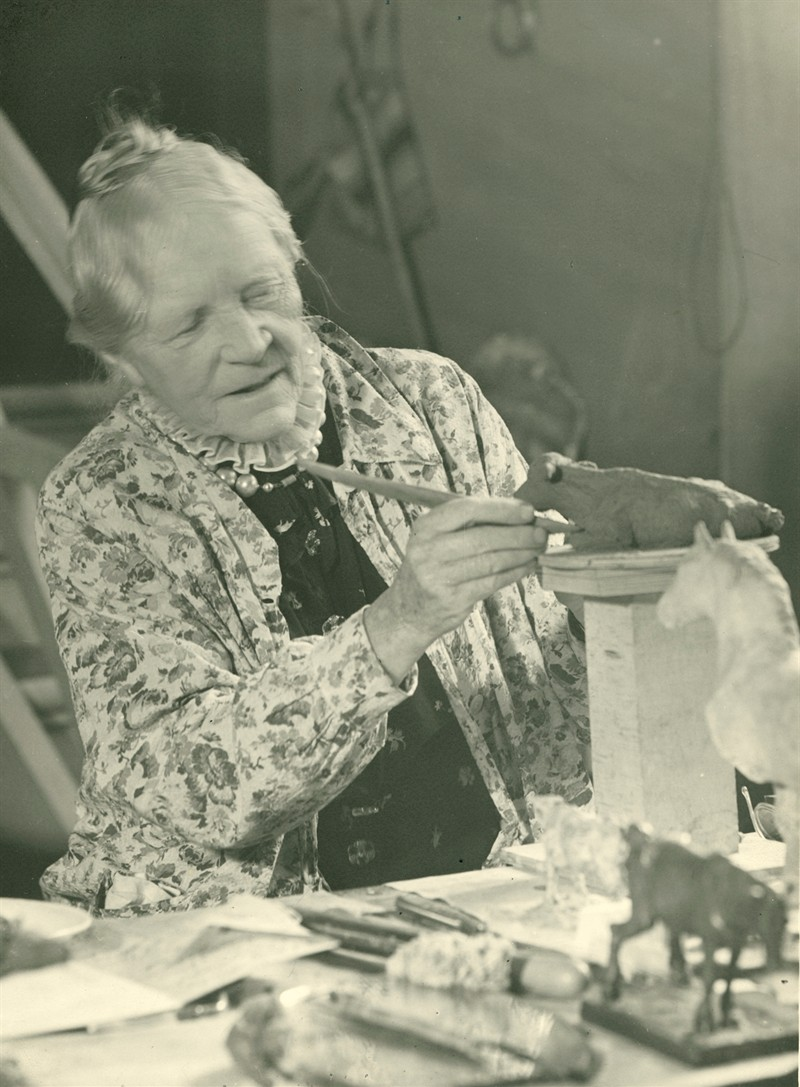
Anne Marie Carl-Nielsen at work in her studio

After Bissen's death, the premises were taken over by his son Vilhelm Bissen. He continued to work at Materialgården but gave up the residence after a few years to move to an apartment in Vester Voldgade. Jens Adolf Jerichau also worked at Materialgården before moving to Charlottenborg.

After Vilhelm Bissen's death in 1913, the sculptor Anne Marie Carl-Nielsen moved in, together with her husband, the composer Carl Nielsen. They lived in the south wing. The couple separated in 1919 but reunited in 1922 and continued to live at Civiletatens Materialgård until 1931. Back in 1908, Anne Marie Carl-Nielsen had been commissioned to create the equestrian statue of King Christian IX for Christiansborg's riding grounds on the opposite side of the canal. and she would continue to work on the project for most of the years she lived at Frederiksholm Canal, not completing it until 1927.

== Architecture ==
The main building along the canal is 21 bays long and has a large hipped roof of red tiles. In the middle there is a two windows high gable fronted wall dormer above an entrance gate. Various other buildings are located to the rear of the main wing, forming several courtyard spaces. Immediately to the left of the main building, also facing the canal, is a diminutive half-timbered house of only three bays. It served as residence for the stable boy (foderdrengen).

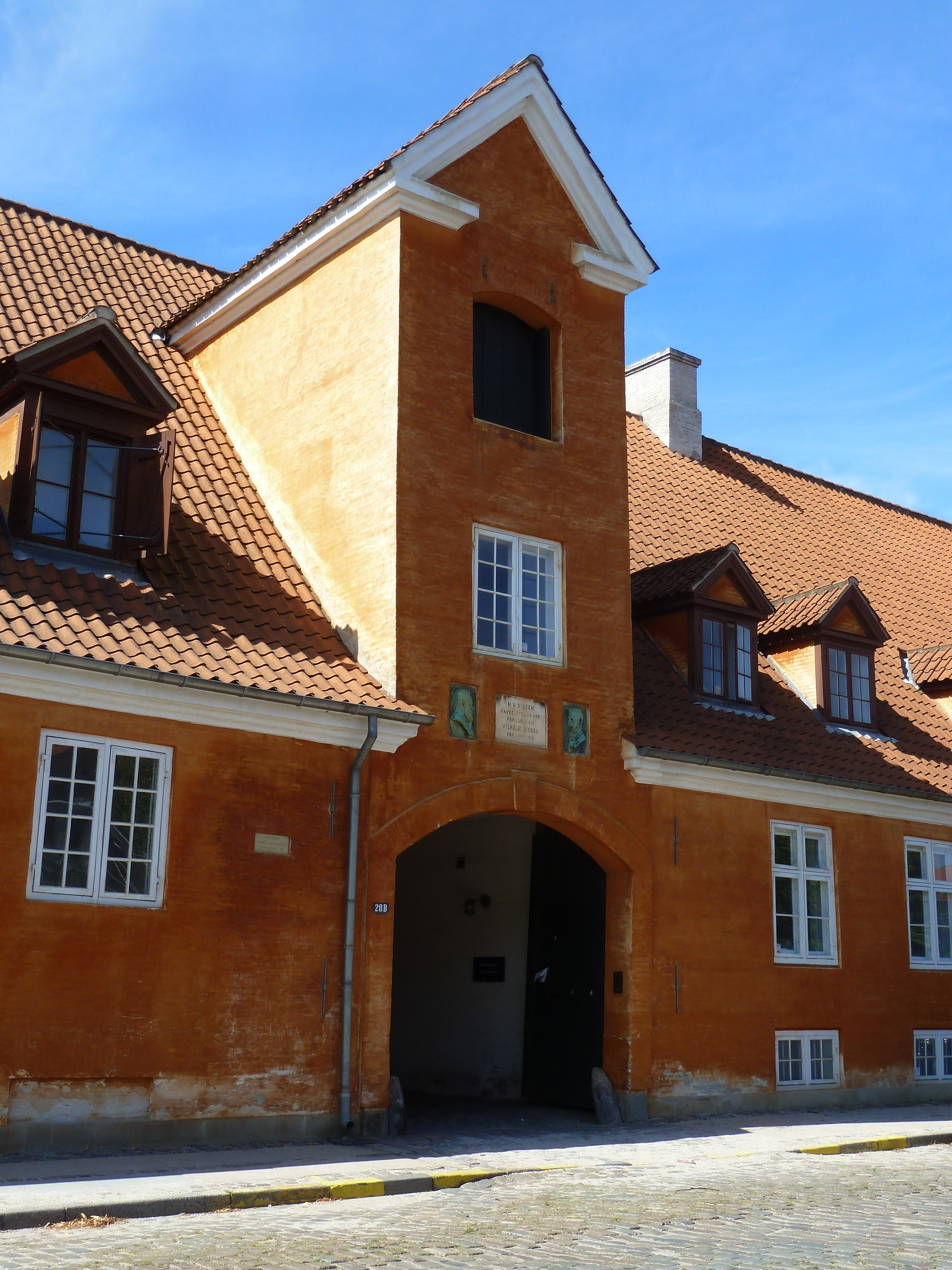
The gate of the main building

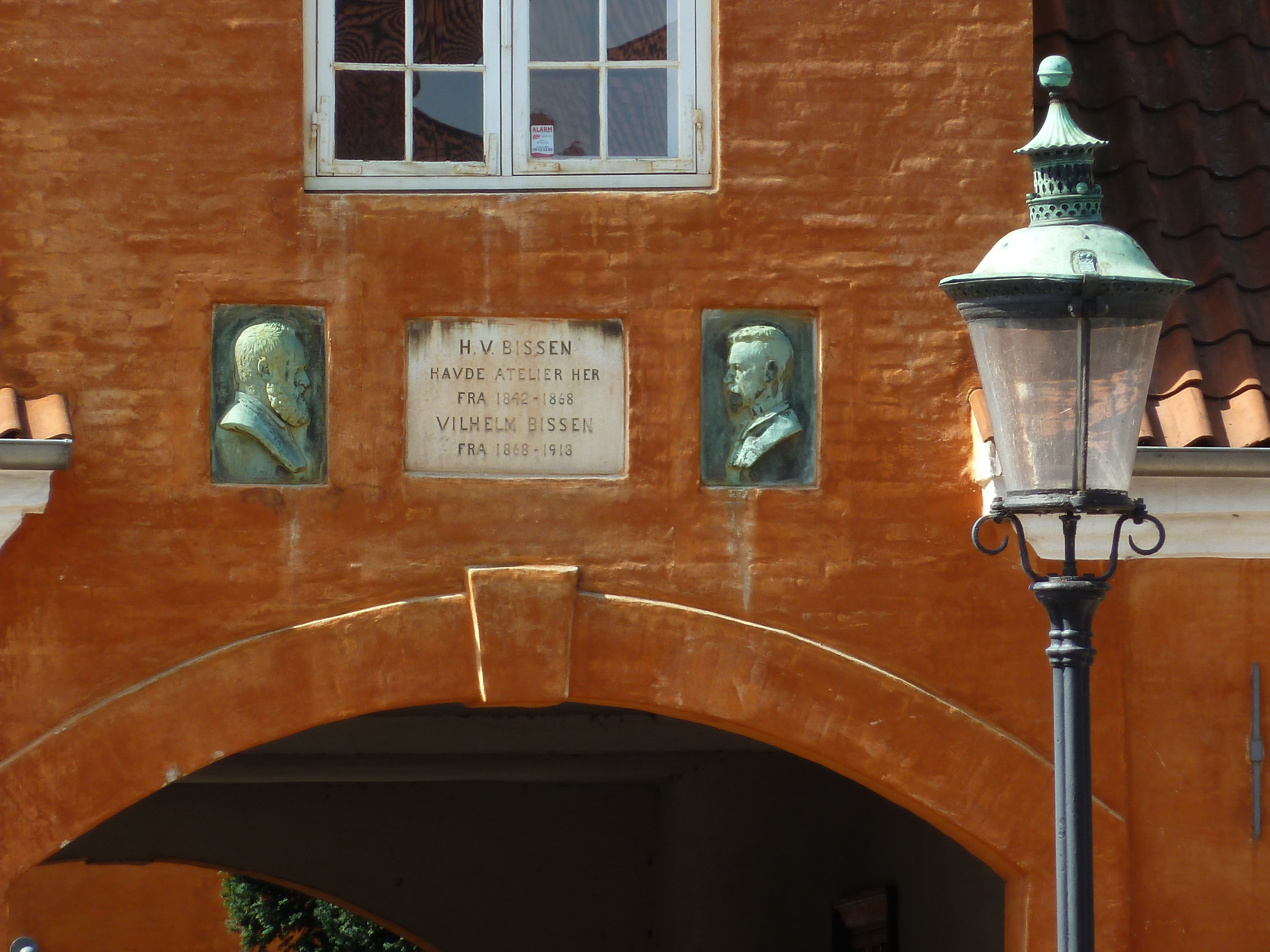
The plaque commemorating the Bissen's

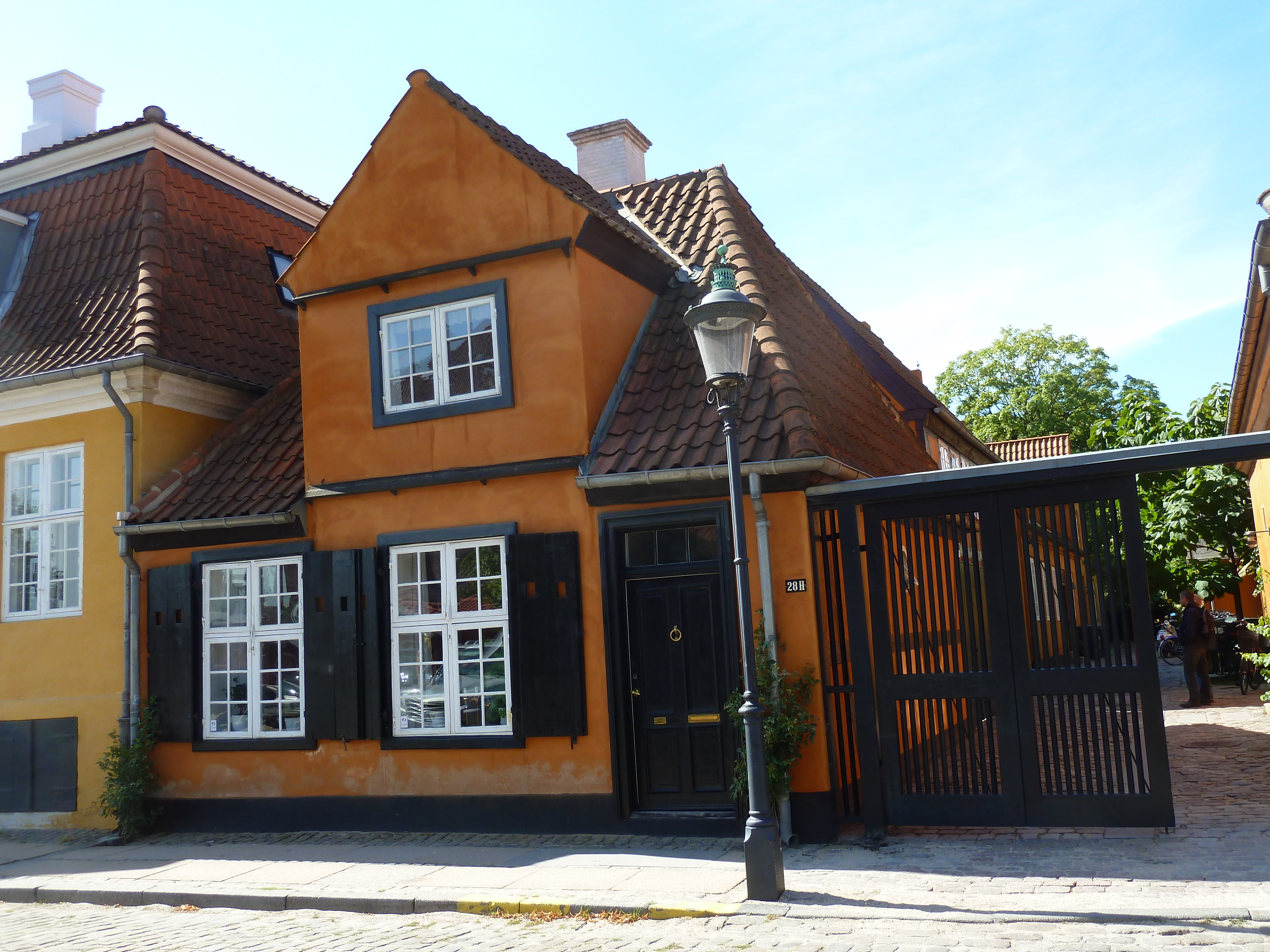
The Stable Boy's House

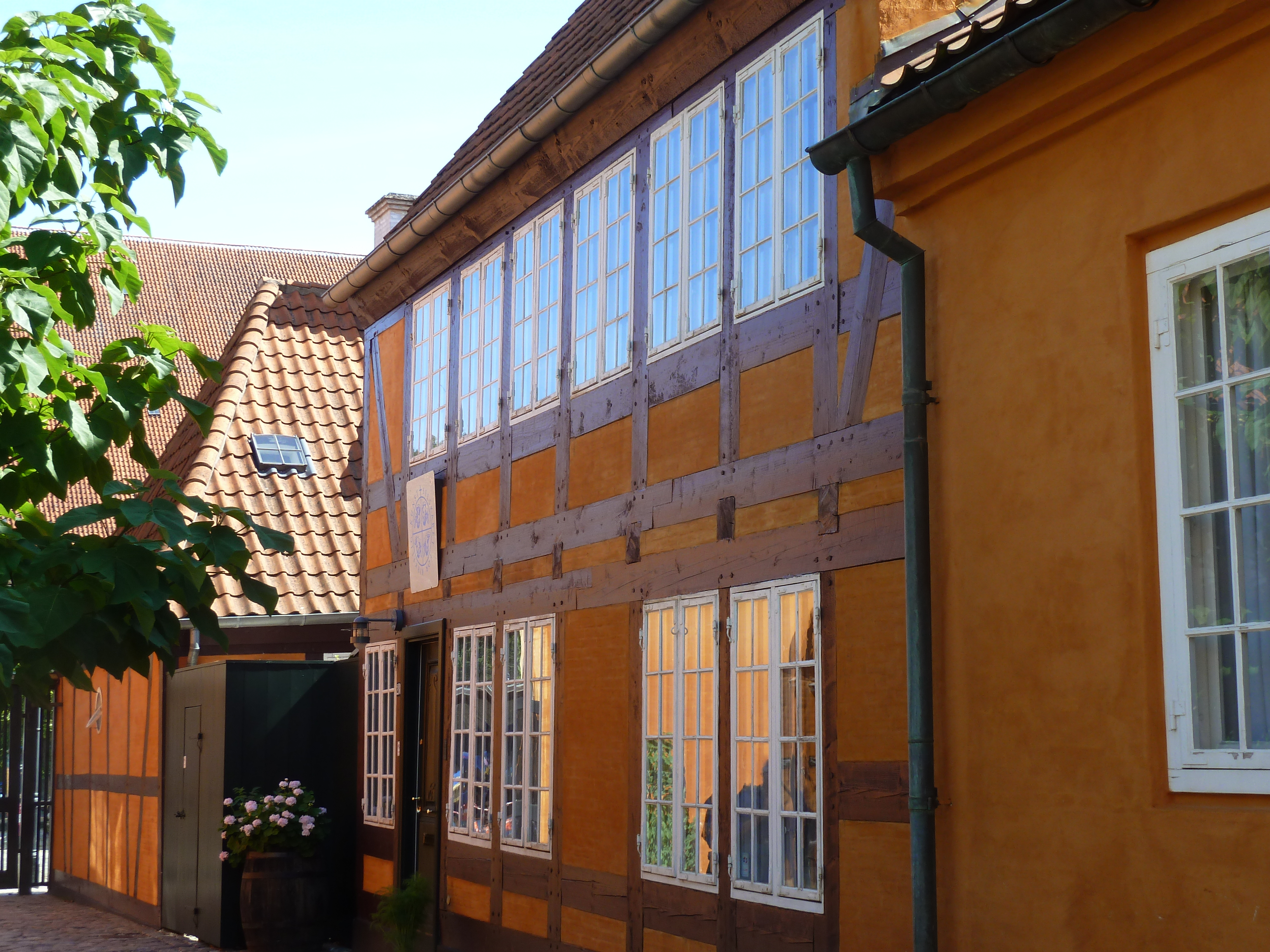
In the small alley behind the Stable Boy's House

== Materialgården today ==
Today the Royal Danish Academy of Fine Arts' School of Sculptury is based in the main building. Other parts of the complex contain residences. The premises were threatened by closure in 2011 but temporarily secured with funds from private sponsors.

The Danish Society for ecclesiastical Art 8 (Selskabet for Kirkelig Kunsts ) is based in 28G Frederiksholms Kanal.

== Literature ==
- Andersen, Henrik B.: Billedhuggerskolen i Frederiksholms Kanal. ISBN 8779450571 . Slots- og Ejendomsstyrelsen. 230 pages (in Danish)
