= Kai Nielsen (sculptor) =

Danish sculptor (1882–1924)

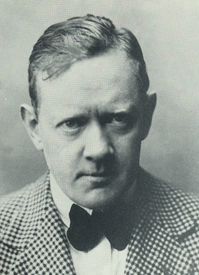
- Kai Nielsen, c. 1915
- Born: 16 November 1882; Svendborg, Denmark
- Died: 2 November 1924 (aged 41); Copenhagen, Denmark
- Education: Royal Danish Academy of Fine Arts
- Known for: Sculpting

Signature
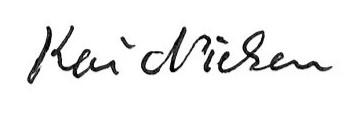

Kai Nielsen (26 November 1882 – 2 November 1924) was a Danish sculptor.

== Biography ==
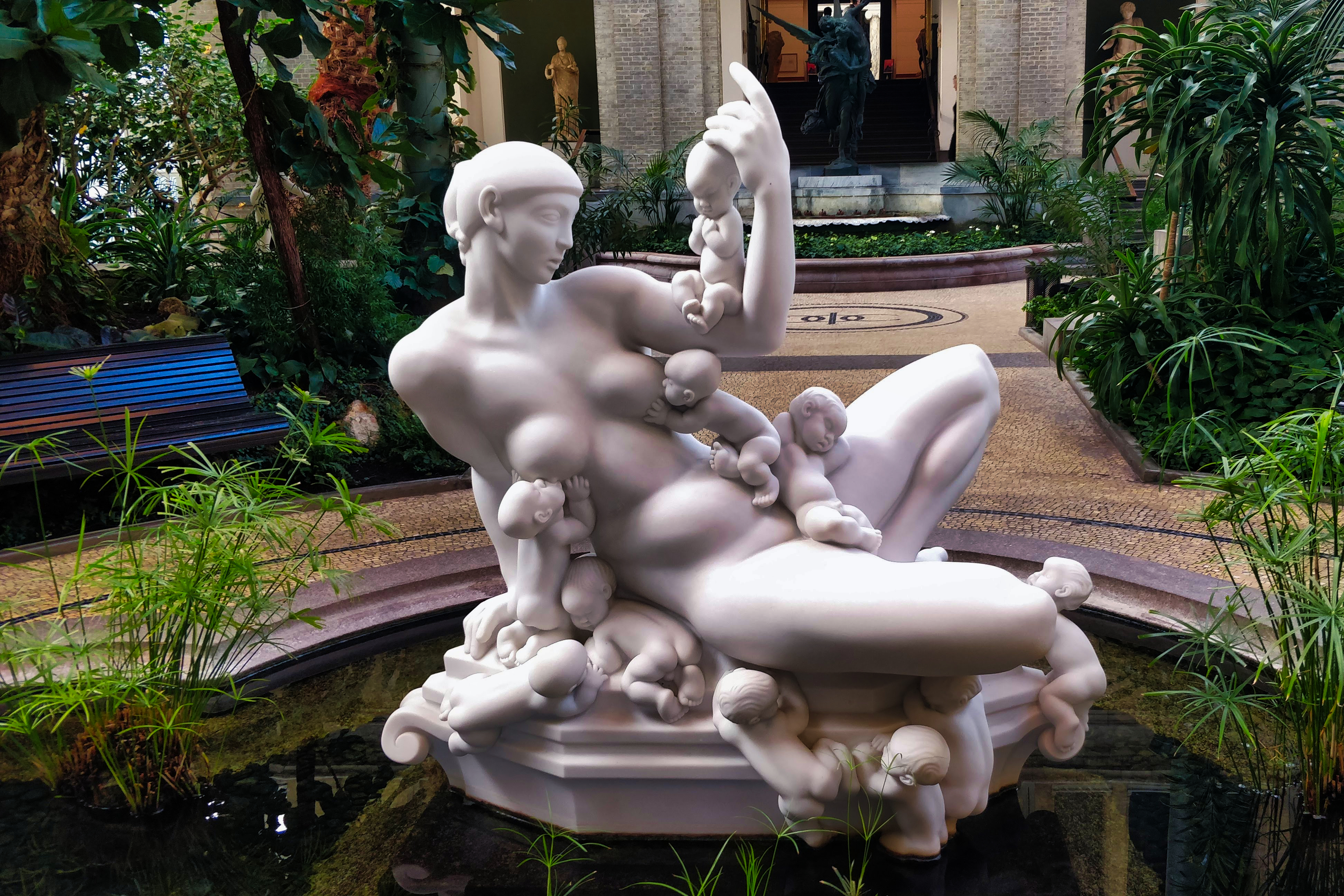
Kai Nielsen's sculpture "The Water Mother"

=== Early life and education ===
Kai Nielsen was born on 26 November 1882 in Svendborg, the son of Christian Nielsen, a watchmaker, and his wife Ane Marie. At 15 he became an apprentice painter but was artistically inclined and began to paint landscapes and portraits. At the same time he studied at the technical school in Svendborg where he was taught moulding by Edvard Eriksen, later famous for creating The Little Mermaid in Copenhagen. In 1901 he moved to Copenhagen and took drawing classes to prepare for the Art Academy. When he applied, they rejected his drawings but accepted him into the Sculpture School in view of a portrait bust he had made in Svendborg, and he became a student of Carl Aarsleff. At the Academy he began a lifelong friendship with Einar Utzon-Frank who also studied sculpture. Together they explored the modern collections at the Ny Carlsberg Glyptotek where Nielsen was particularly impressed by the works of Auguste Rodin and Constantin Meunier.

=== Career ===
Nielsen developed a socially conscious style (The Blind Girl, 1907, Ny Carlsberg Glyptotek). He had his breakthrough with Naked (1908) which was acquired by the Danish National Gallery. The Marble Girl attracted attention for its redefinition of the relationship between subject and material with its equal emphasis of the sculpture as woman figure and as stone block. It also introduced the rounded female forms which continued to be a dominant subject throughout his production.

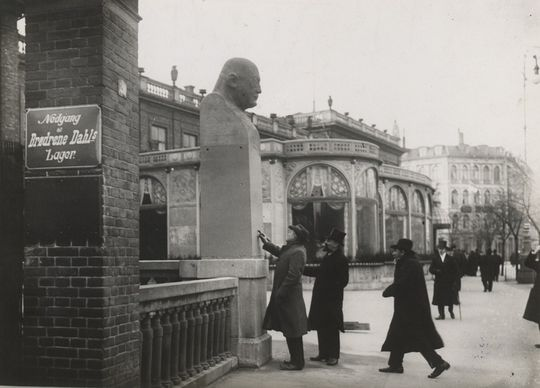
Kai Nielsen showing his Bindesbøll bust to art historian Karl Madsen and Prof. Joakim Skovgård

A large portrait bust of Thorvald Bindesbøll erected at Vester Boulevard (now H. C. Andersen Boulevard) in Copenhagen was his first large-scale commission in the portrait genre. It was followed by smaller portrait heads of artist colleagues such as Niels Larsen Stevns and Ludvig Karsten, the boxer Dick Nelson (1918) and more children.

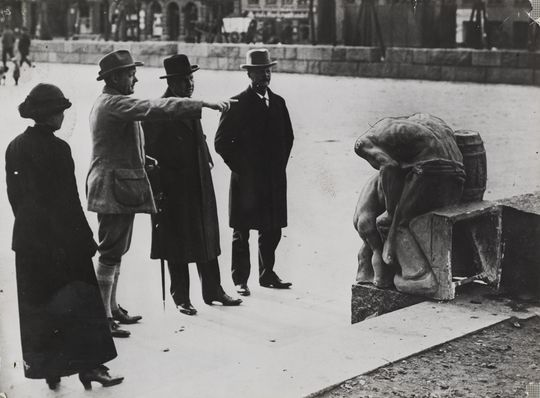
Kai Nielsen at Blågårds Plads

One of Nielsen's first public sculptures, the Ymir Well from 1913 for a square in Faaborg, was controversial in its own day for the nudity of the jötunn Ymir.

Around the same time he collaborated with the architect Ivar Bentsen on a redevelopment of Blågårds Plads, a public square in one of the poorest working-class neighbourhoods in Copenhagen. His work, executed from 1912 to 1916, consists of 22 granite sculptures integrated in a low wall which encloses a central, rectangular section of the square. The sculptures all portray a person plying a trade—a tailor, a cooper, a baker—accompanied by an abundance of chubby toddlers. The intention was to celebrate the workers and the children of the surrounding community and their everyday lives. It provoked hefty debate and criticism when it was inaugurated but was innovative in its integration of the sculptures in a piece of street furniture and a functional context. The wall was intended for sitting and climbing on, as well as the central space for children's play, and also incorporated a "soapbox" or tribunal for public speaking.

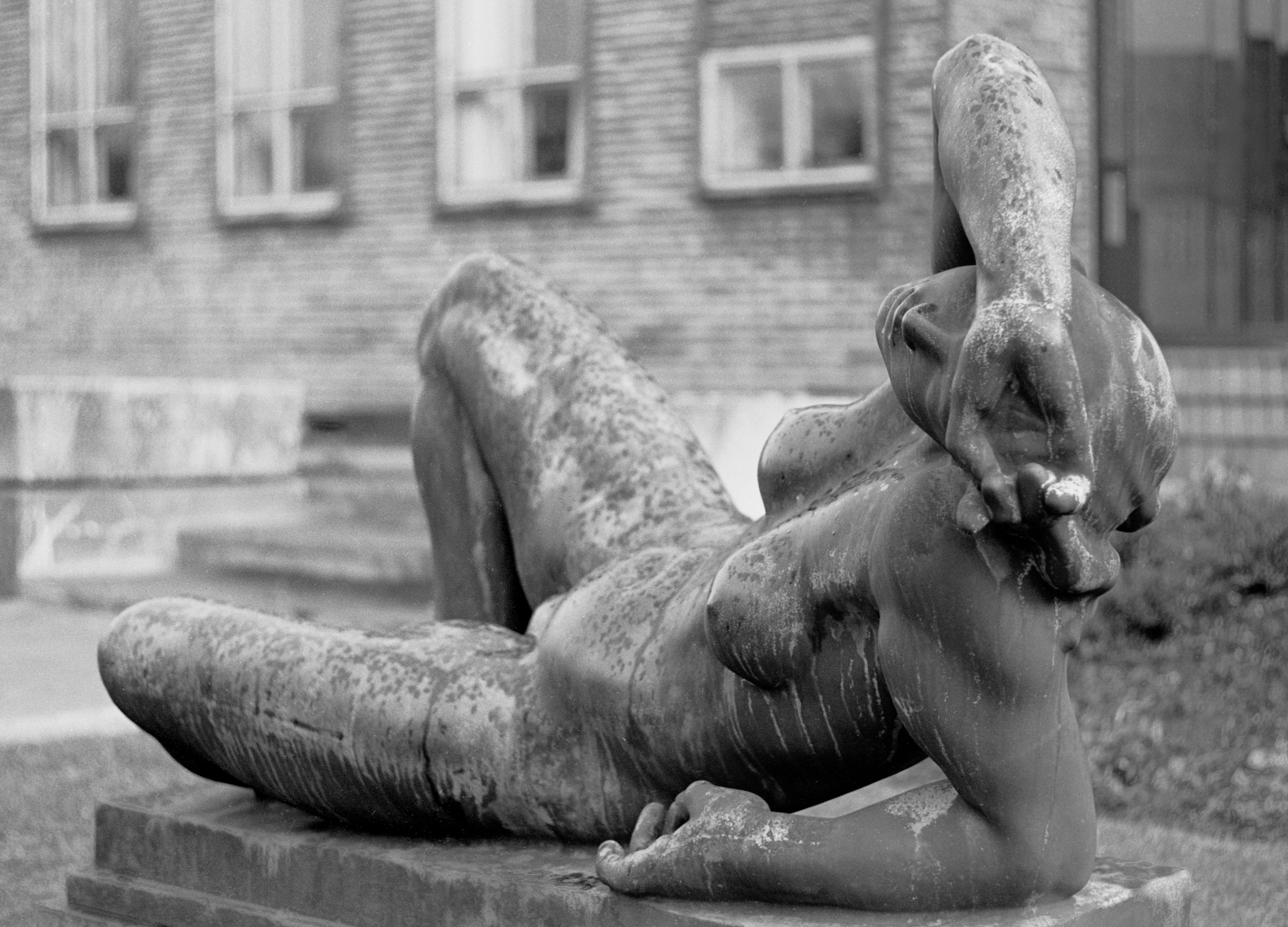
Leda without the swan, 1920

From 1918 to 1920 he created a comprehensive decorative scheme for the Norwegian shipping magnate Anton Fredrik Klaveness's park at Lysaker outside Oslo. Its centrepiece, The Water Mother (Danish: Vandmoderen), features prominently in the winter garden of the Ny Carlsberg Glyptotek which also holds the original plaster model.

=== Early death ===
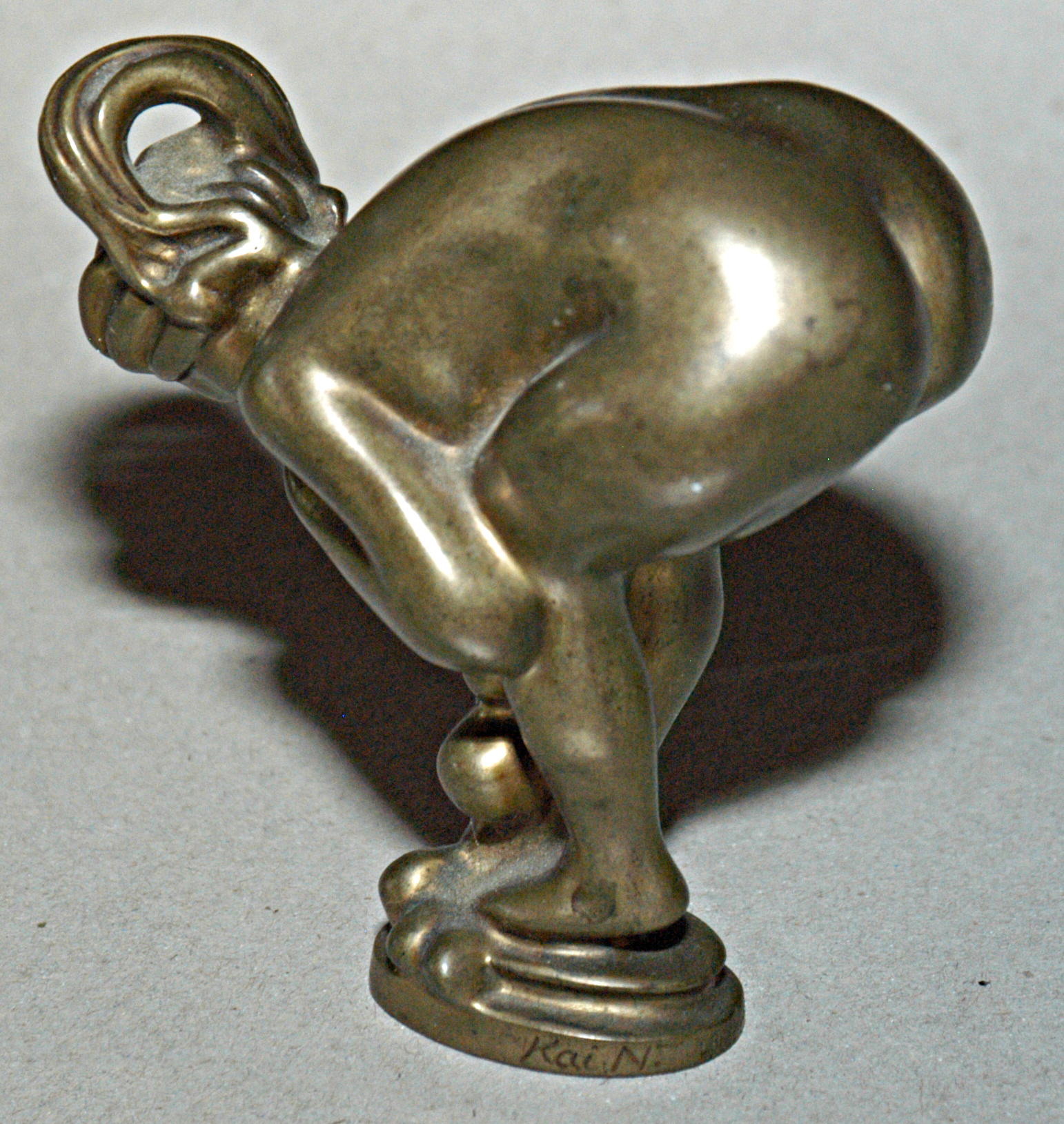
Bronze statuette, 14 cm

Kai Nielsen died on 2 November 1924 while working on a draft for a Maritime Monument (1924, Ny Carlsberg Glyptotek) after several lengthy spells of illness.

== Statuettes ==
Kai Nielsen also created statuettes which were produced for Bing & Grondahl and H.A. Kähler.

== Selected works ==
=== Museums ===
- Blind Peasant Girl, Ny Carlsberg Glyptotek (1907)
- The Marble Girl, Danish National Gallery (marble, 1908)
- Naked, Faaborg Museum (1810)
- Leda and the swan, Ny Carlsberg Glyptotek (limestone, 1918)
- Leda without swan, National Museum of Serbia, Belgrade

=== Outdoor sculptures ===
- Thorvald Bindesbøll, H. C. Andersen Boulevard (1909–10)
- Ymir Well, Faaborg (sandstone 1913, bronze 1964)
- Sculptures, Blågårds Plads, Copenhagen (1916)
- Århus girl, Aarhus Central Station, Aarhus (1921)
- Mother and children (Mor og barn), Frogner Park, Oslo (black granite, 1925)
- Venus with the apple, Enghaveparken, Copenhagen (1929)

== Gallery ==
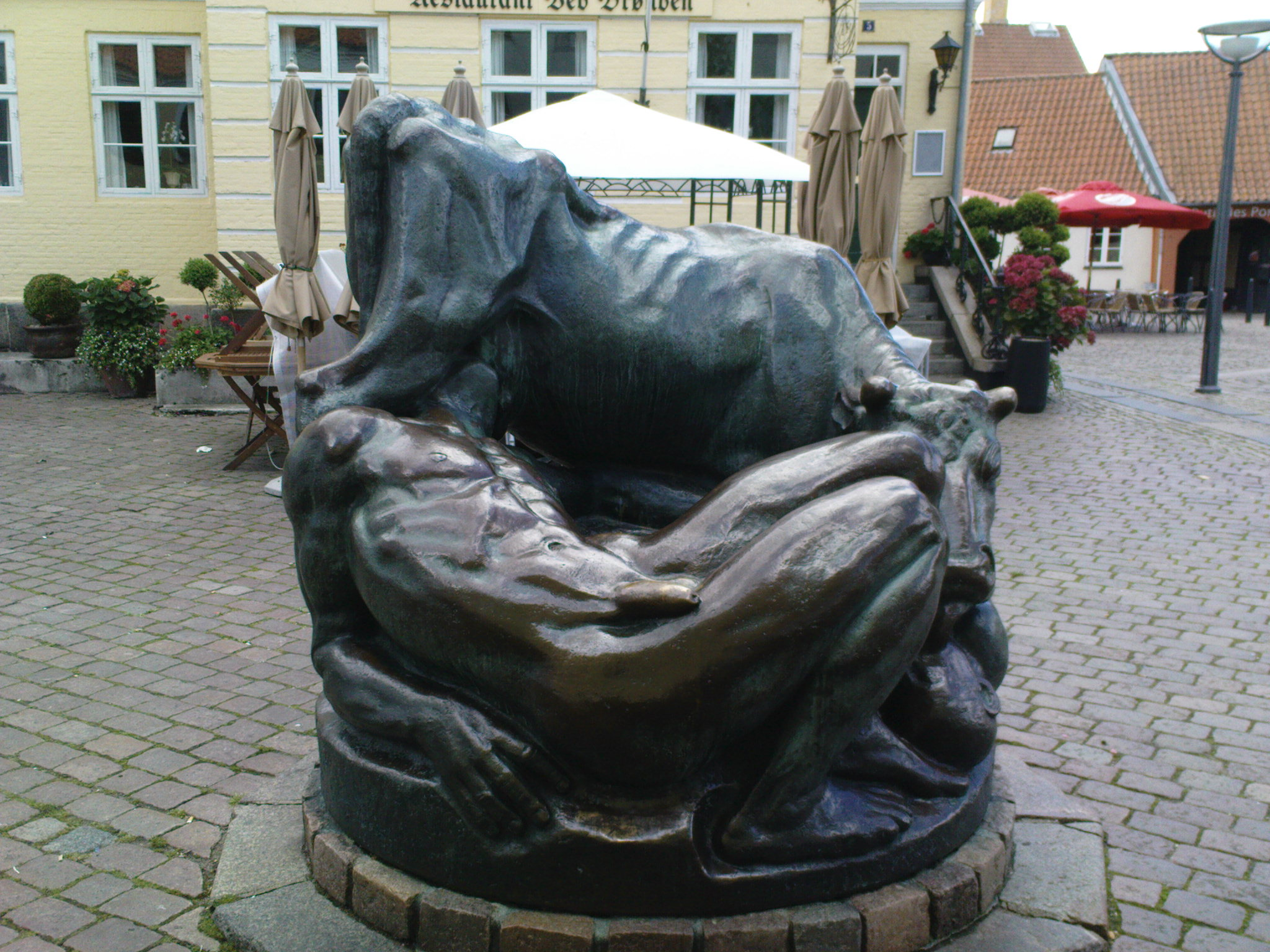
Ymir Well, Faaborg

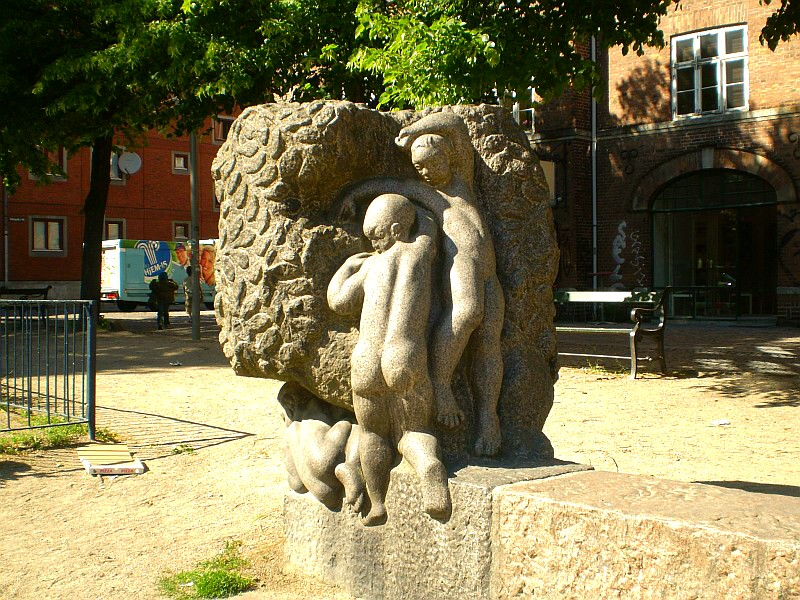
A corner sculpture at Blågårds Plads, 1916

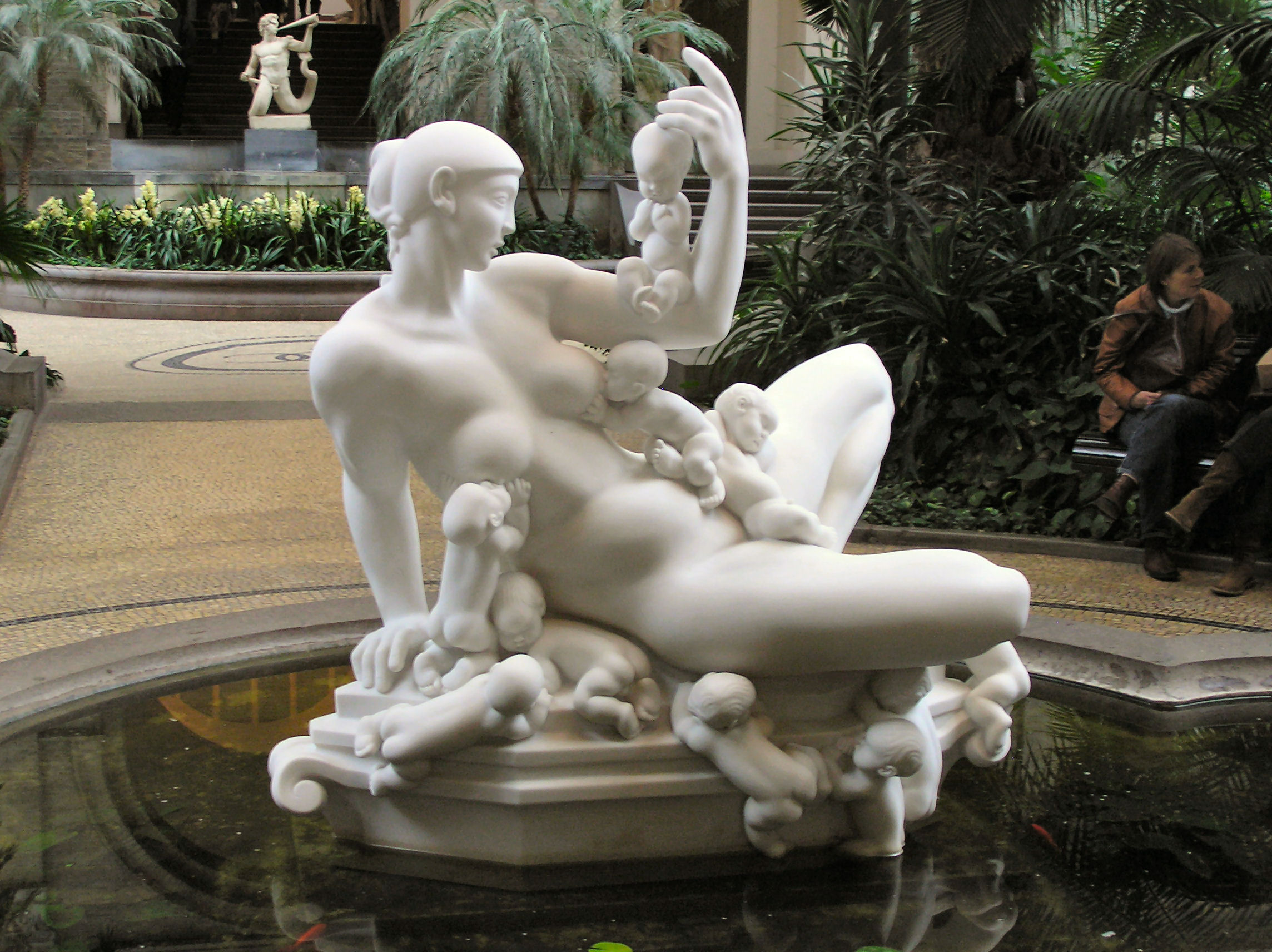
The Water Mother in the winter garden of the Ny Carlsberg Garden

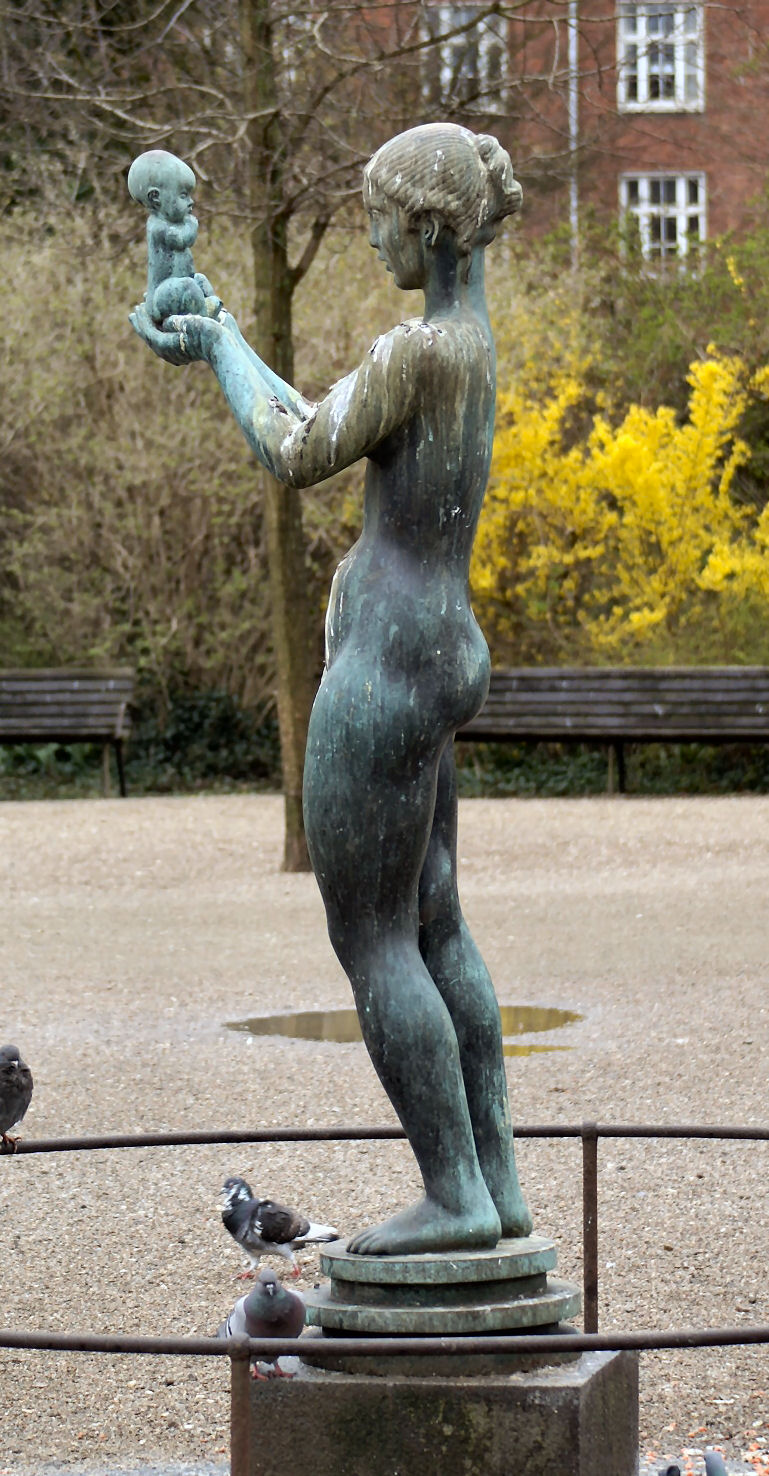
Venus and the apple in Enghave Park, 1929

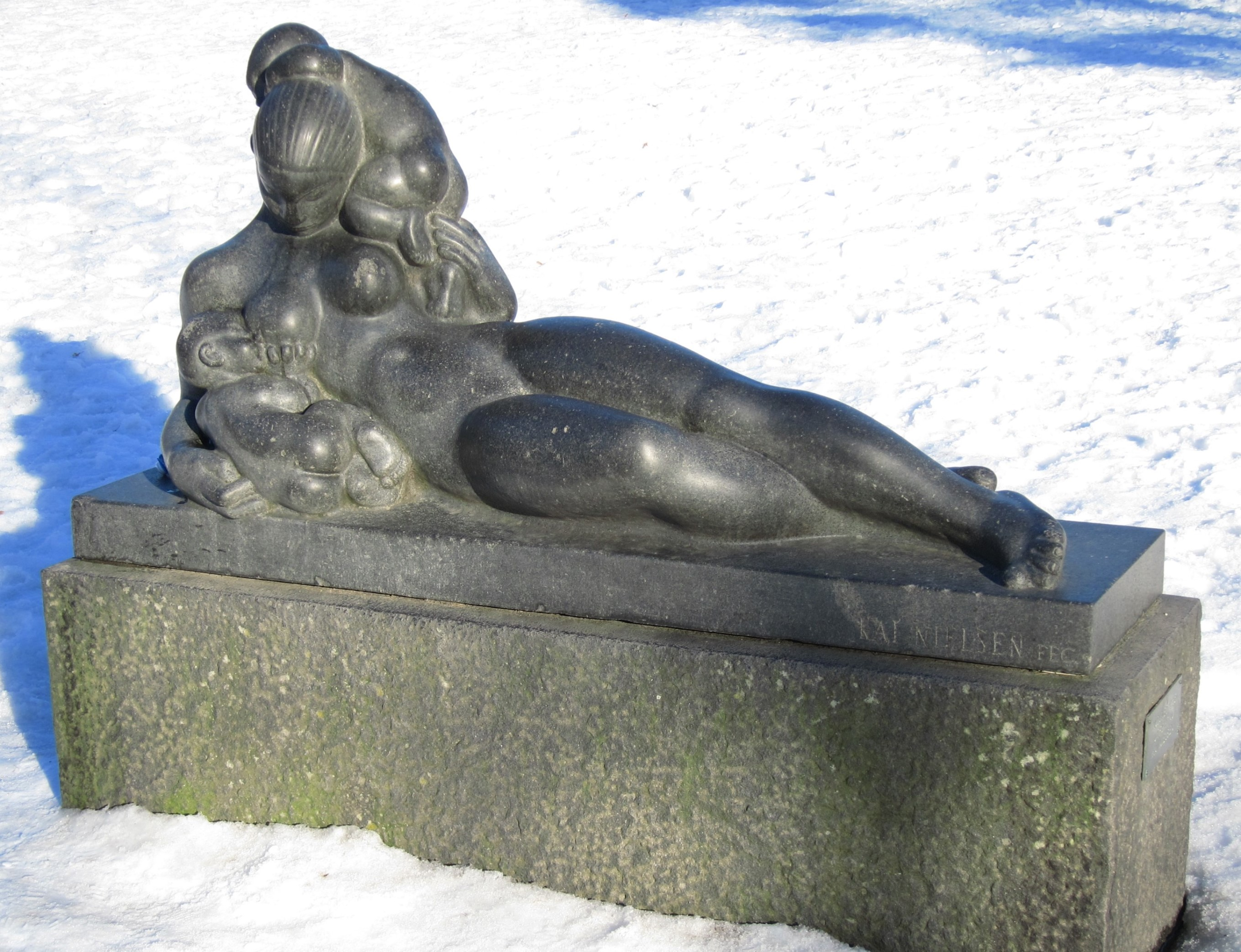
Mother and children (Mor og barn), black granite, in Frogner Park, Oslo, 1925

== See also ==
- Art of Denmark
