= Blågårds Plads =

Public square in Nørrebro, Copenhagen

Coordinates: 55.6864°N 12.5571°E

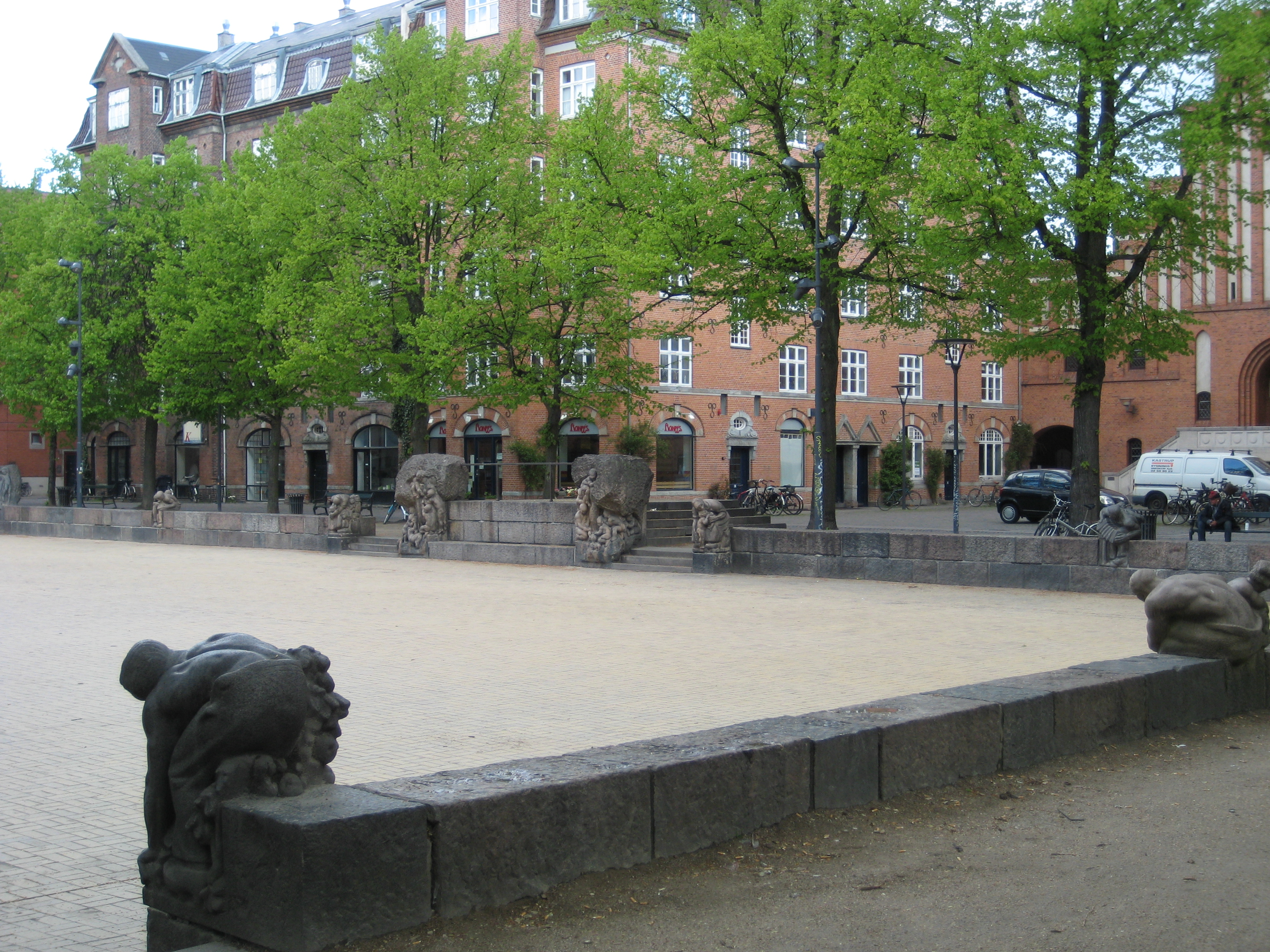
A section of the wall

Blågårds Plads (lit. 'Blue Manor Square') is a public square attached to Blågårdsgade, a side street to Nørrebrogade in the Nørrebro district of Copenhagen, Denmark. It is a popular venue for events and various activities in the summer time.

== History ==
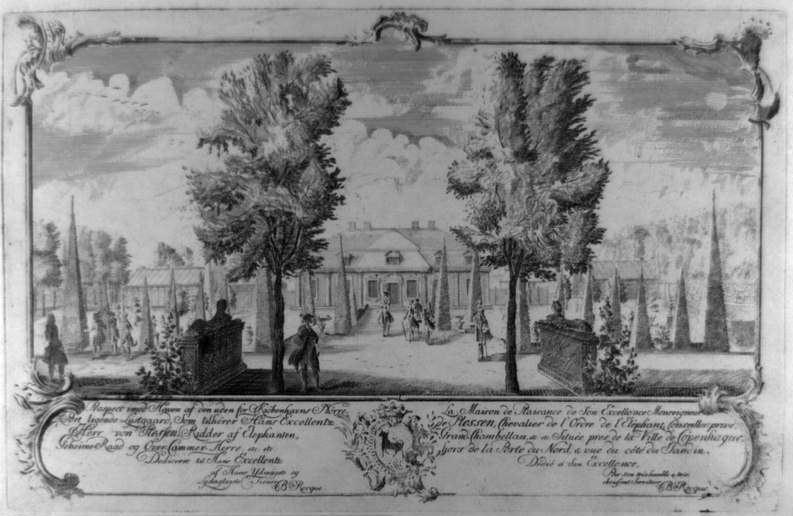
Barthélemy de La Rocque: View of Blaagaard, c. 1745

The square takes its name from a country estate, Blågård (English: Blue Manor), which was established at the site by Christoffer Gabel in the middle of the 17th century on the grounds of a former brickyard. Later owners included Ulrik Frederik Gyldenløve, Prince Charles and Peter von Scholten.

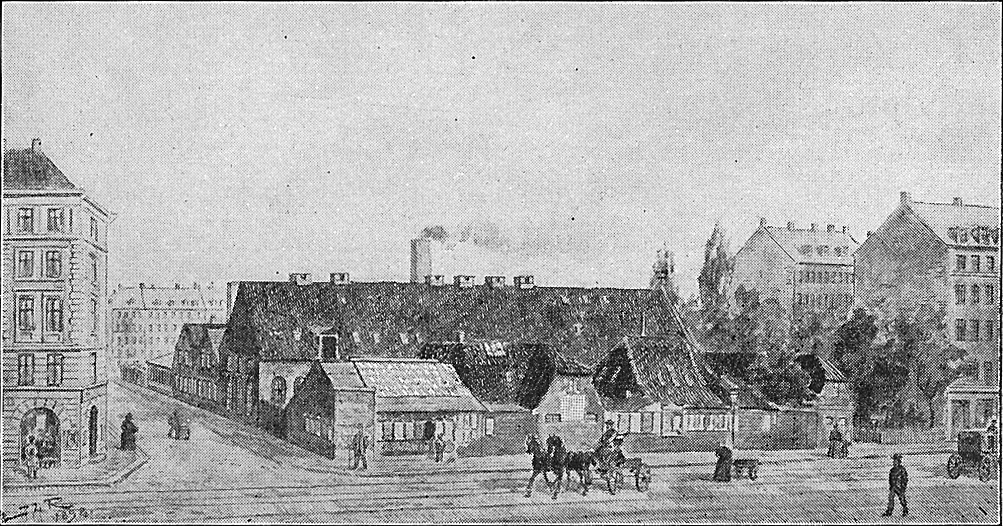
Anker Heegaard's iron foundry

In 1827 the owner obtained a licence from King Frederick VI to convert the property into an iron foundry. From 1852 to 1889, Copenhagen's old fortification ring was gradually decommissioned and the area began to undergo rapid urbanisation, becoming one of the densest and poorest parts of the city.

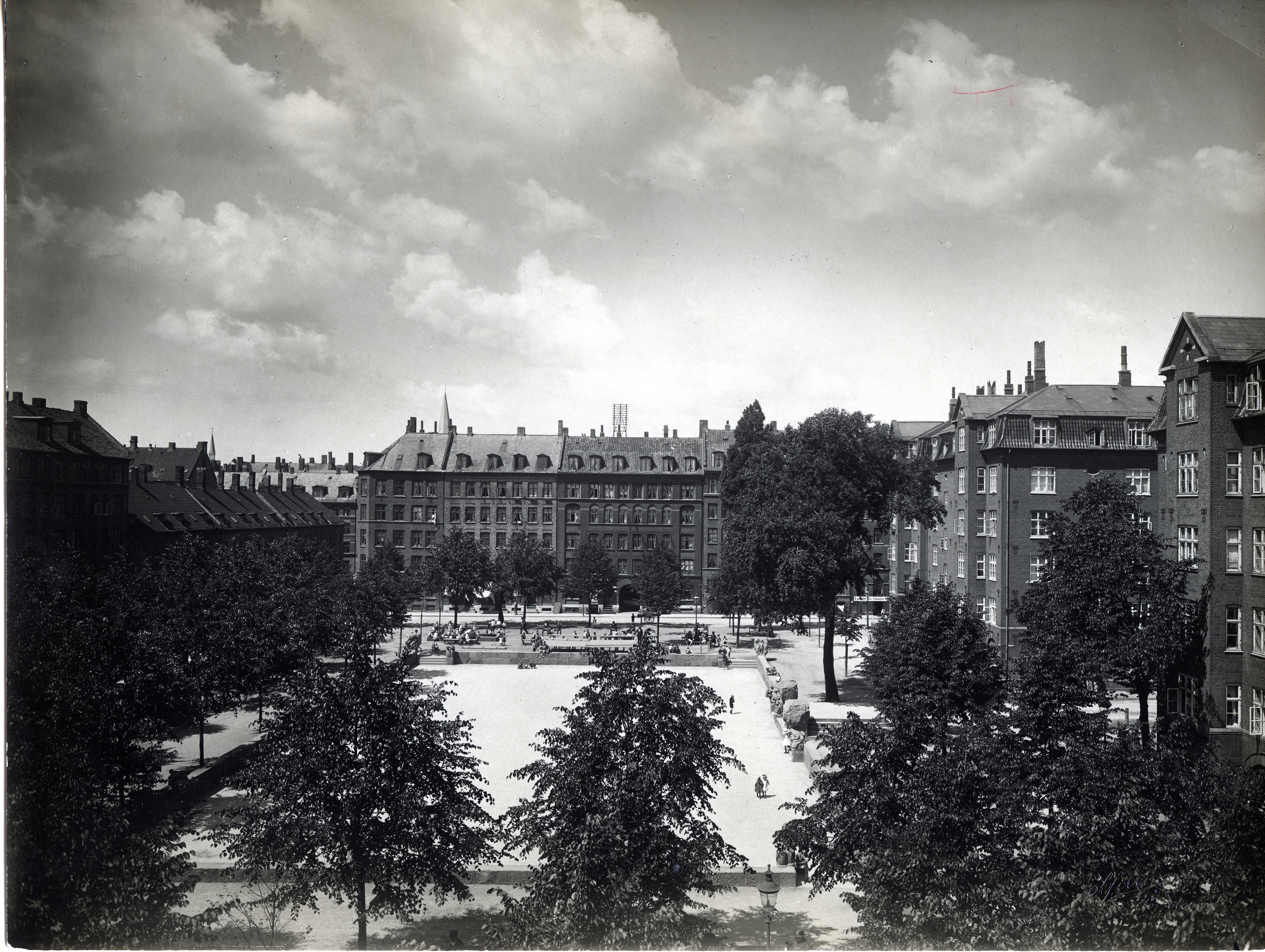
Blågårds Plads in 1921.

The foundry's highly polluting activities posed a severe health hazard and the neighbourhood became known as the Black Square (Danish: Den Sorte Firkant).

In 1898 the city acquired the property to turn it into a public space. The first square was laid out in 1902, enclosed by two rows of large-leaved Linden trees.

In the 1980s, the old buildings on two sides of the square were demolished and replaced by new houses.

== Buildings ==
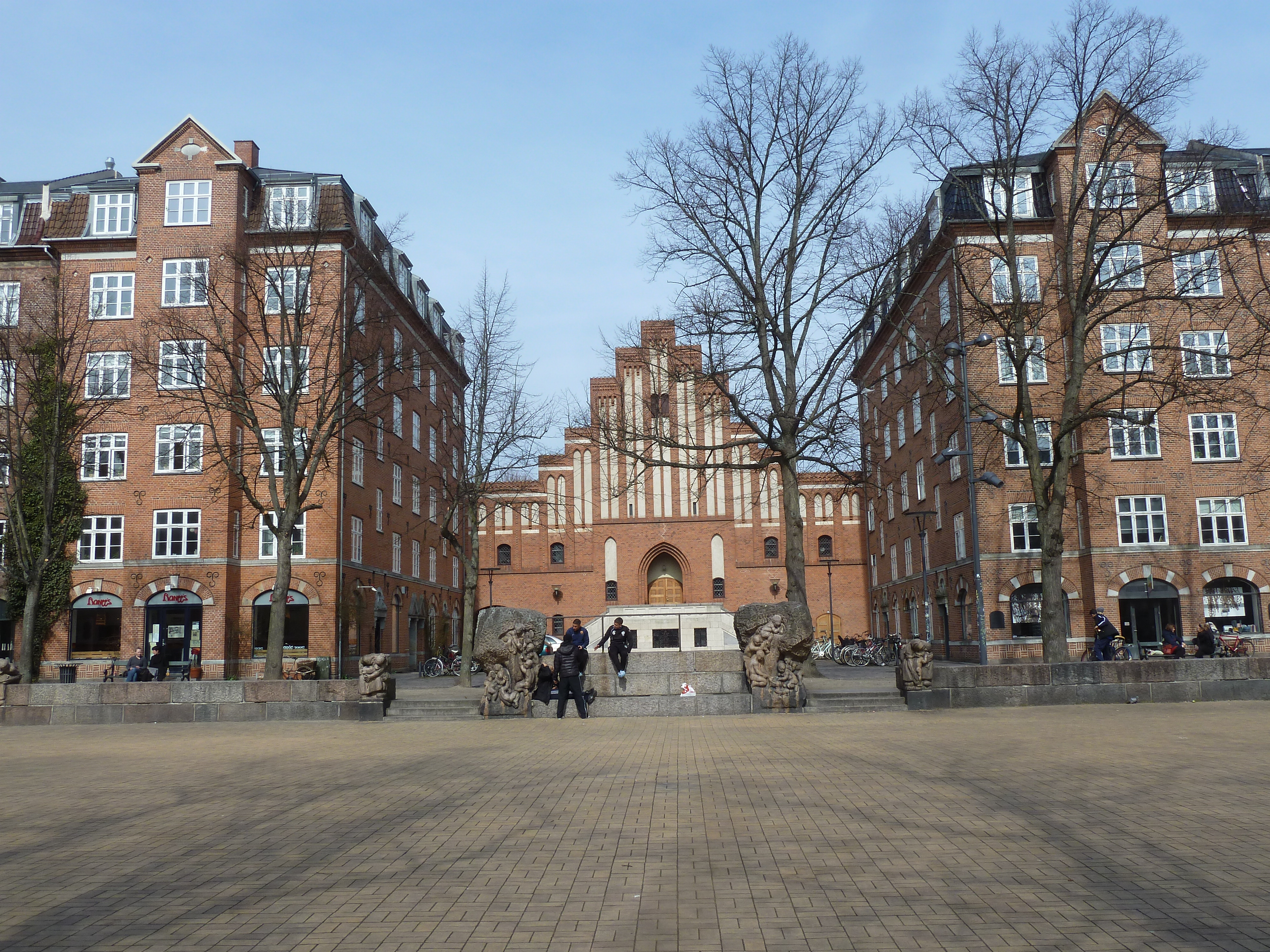
Blågård Church

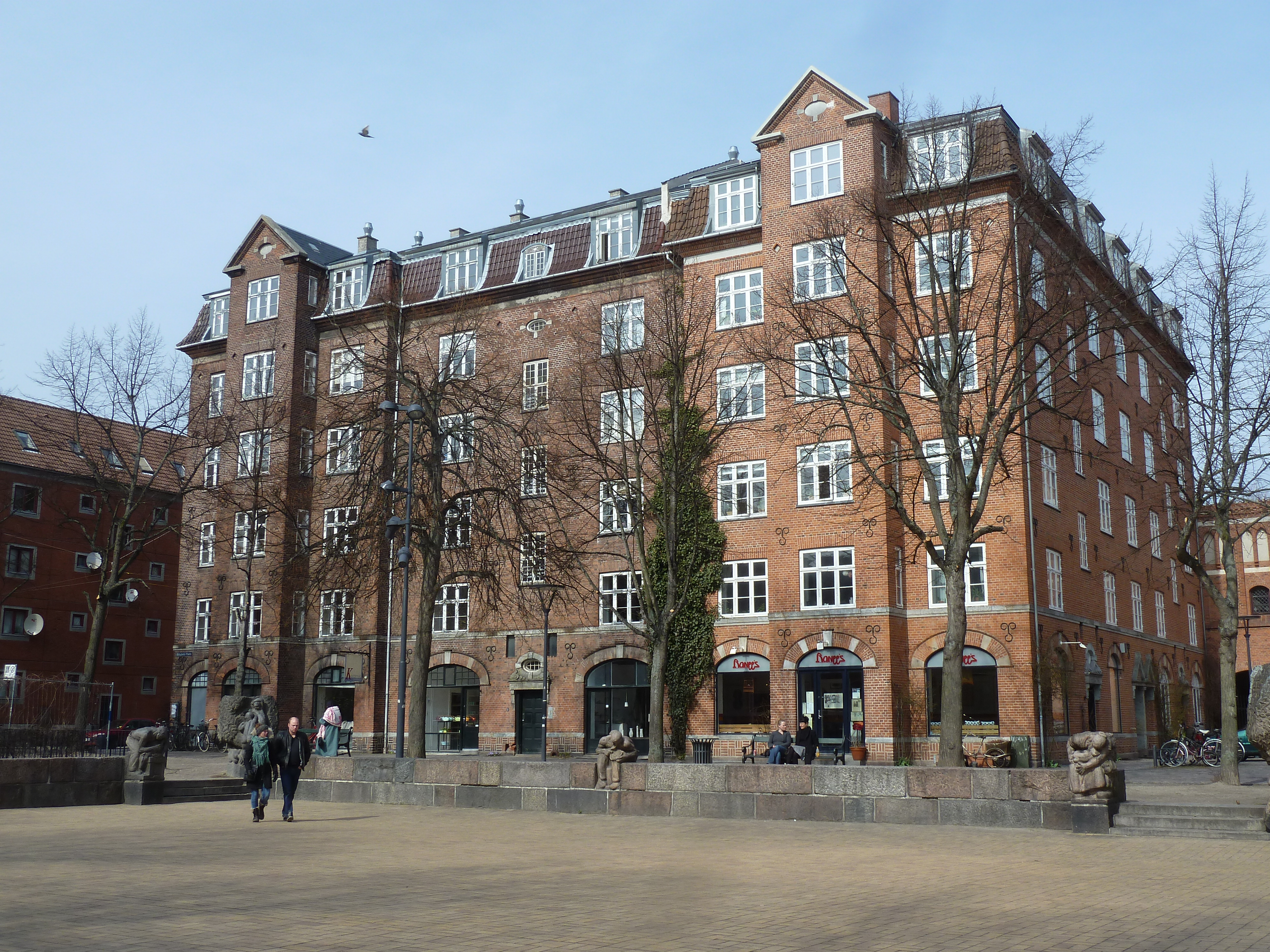
The building to the left of the church (No. 8-10), built 1900–1902

Blågård Church is located on the north side of the square. It was built in 1926 to a design by Andreas Clemmensen and Johan Nielsen, replacing a temporary church by Martin Nyrop from 1905.

The church is flanked by two buildings from circa 1900. The buildings on the two other sides are from the early 1980s.

== Kai Nielsen sculptures ==
The space is dominated by 22 granite figures integrated into a low granite wall enclosing a depressed, rectangular section in the centre of the square. Designed by sculptor Kai Nielsen in collaboration with the architect Ivar Bentsen, they depict people plying a trade—a tailor, a cooper, a barber, and a baker etc.—all in the company of a toddler. In the corners stand larger figure groups depicting playing children.

== Blågårds Plads today ==
With a community centre, a library and several popular cafés, Blågårds Plads is a focal point for the life of the surrounding neighbourhood, which is still known as the Black Square. The depressed central section serves as a football pitch in summer and features an ice-skating rink in winter.

The street gang known as Loyal to Familia (LTF) was founded around Blågårds Plads in 2013. They became entangled in a violent gang conflict with their rivals, Brothas, situated in Mjølnerparken, during 2017.

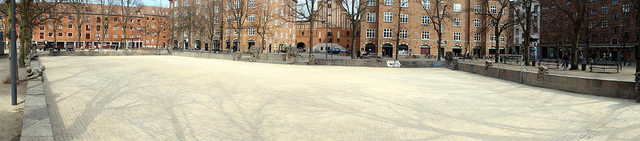
The central space
