= Blågårdsgade =

Street in Nørrebro, Copenhagen

Coordinates: 55.6862°N 12.5580°E

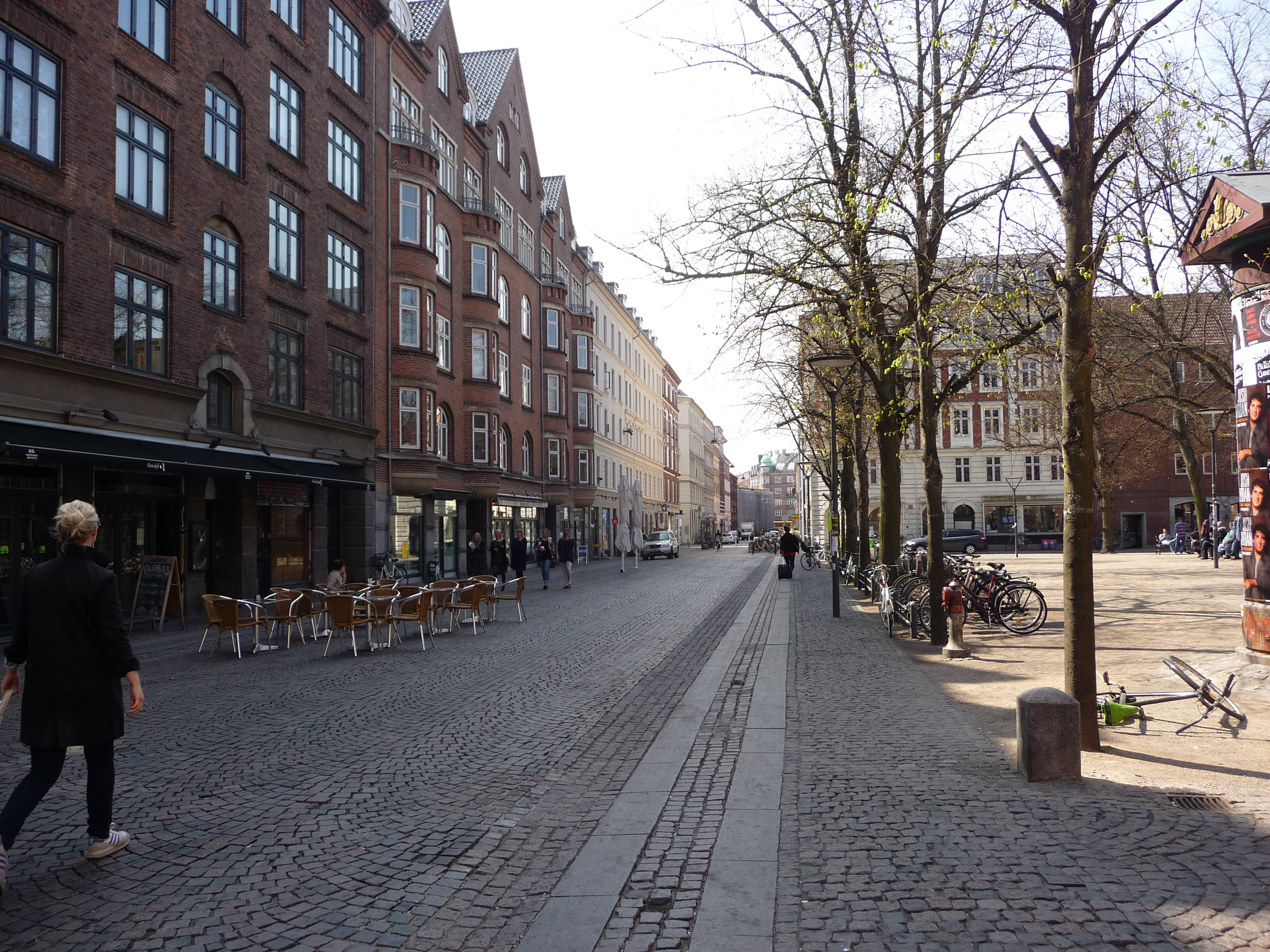
Blågårdsgade, looking west from Blågårds Plads

Blågårdsgade is a mostly pedestrianized street in the Nørrebro district of Copenhagen, Denmark. It runs from Nørrebrogade in the northeast to Åboulevard in the southwest and passes the square Blågårds Plads. The street is known for its many shops and cafés.

== History ==
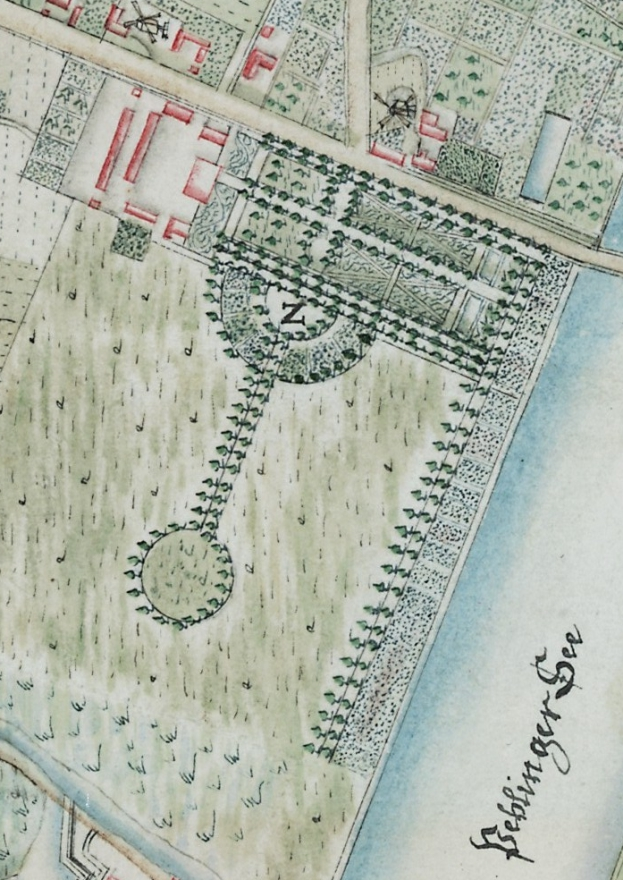
Map detail that shows the tree-lined driveway that led up to Blågård from present-day Nørrebrogade

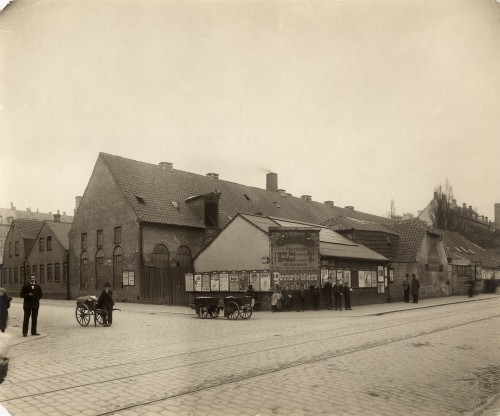
Anker Heegaard's iron foundry at Blågårdsgade 20 in 1898

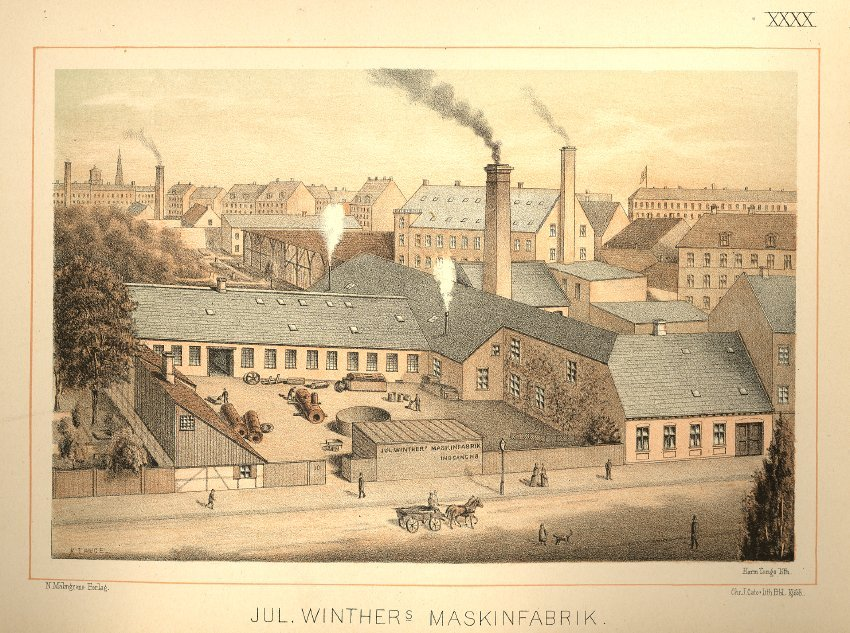
Julius Winther's Machine Factory

The street takes its name after a country house, Blågård, built at the site by Prince Charles in the 1700s. A tree-lined road, Blågårdsvej (Blågård Road), was constructed between Nørrebrogade in the east and the Ladegård Canal (now Åboulevard) in the west, when the estate was divided into parcels in the 1820s. In 1827, Mathias Anker Heegaard, the owner of Blågård, obtained a licence from King Frederick VI to convert the property into an iron foundry.

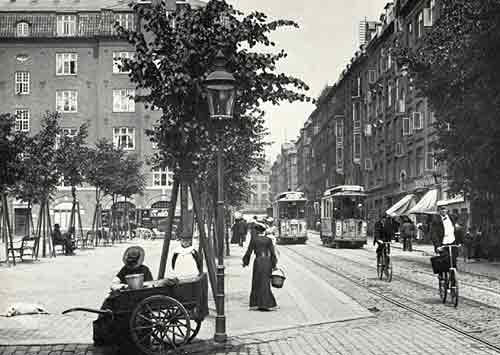
Blågårdsgade in the 1900s

The so-called Demarcation Line which restricted the construction of buildings in the area was moved from Jagtvej to Peblinge Lake in 1852 and the street received its current name in 1859. The teacher training college Blaagaard Seminarium was founded in rented rooms in Blågårdsgade in 1859 and a purpose-built building was inaugurated at No. 15 in 1863. The street was first built over with lower and more scattered buildings but with taller apartment blocks in the 1880s. The street was part of a working-class neighbourhood and also developed a city-wide reputation as a shopping street. The city acquired the iron foundry site in 1898 and established Blågårds Plds to improve the area. Tram line No. 3 operated through the street in both directions between 1906 and 1949.

== Notable buildings and residents ==
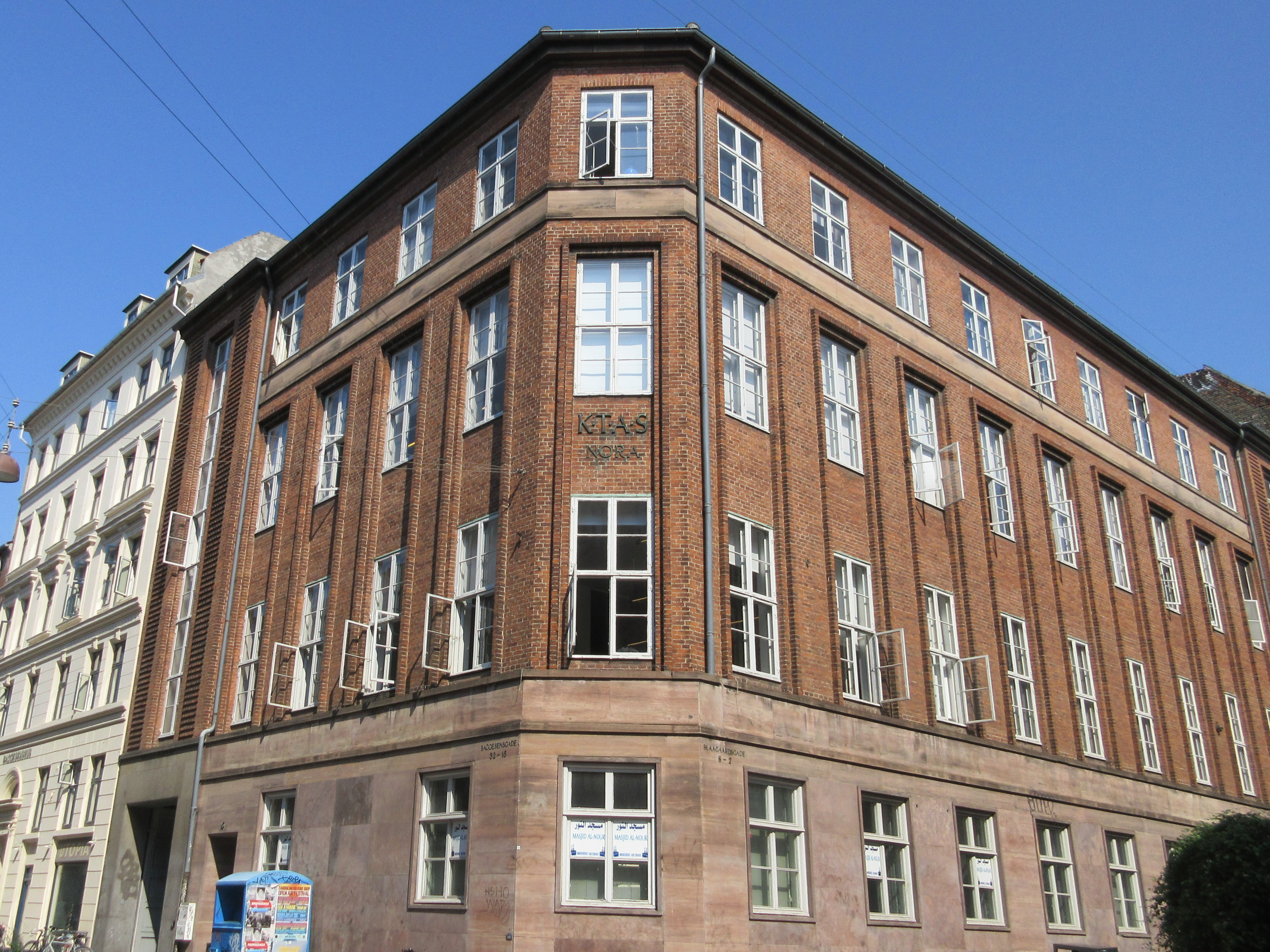
Blaagaard buildings 9

Located at the corner with Nørrebrogade, Alderstrøst was built in 1870 by Association of Craftsmen in Copenhagen to provide affordable housing for elderly, indigent members and their widows.

The building at No. 8 (Blågårdsgade 8/Baggesensgade 16) is KTAS' former Central Nord (Central North. It was built in 1933 to design by Jens Inwersen.

No. 29, the building with the canted bay windows located opposite Blågårds Plads, is from 1908 and was designed by Johannes Strøm Tejsen.

In the courtyard at Blågårdsgade stands a building which was built as a temporary church in 1889 and later used by the Evangelical-Lutheran Mission. It was designed by Robert Møller.

== Cultural references ==
- Blågårdsgade is used as a location in the Danish-Swedish television series The Bridge.

== Gallery ==
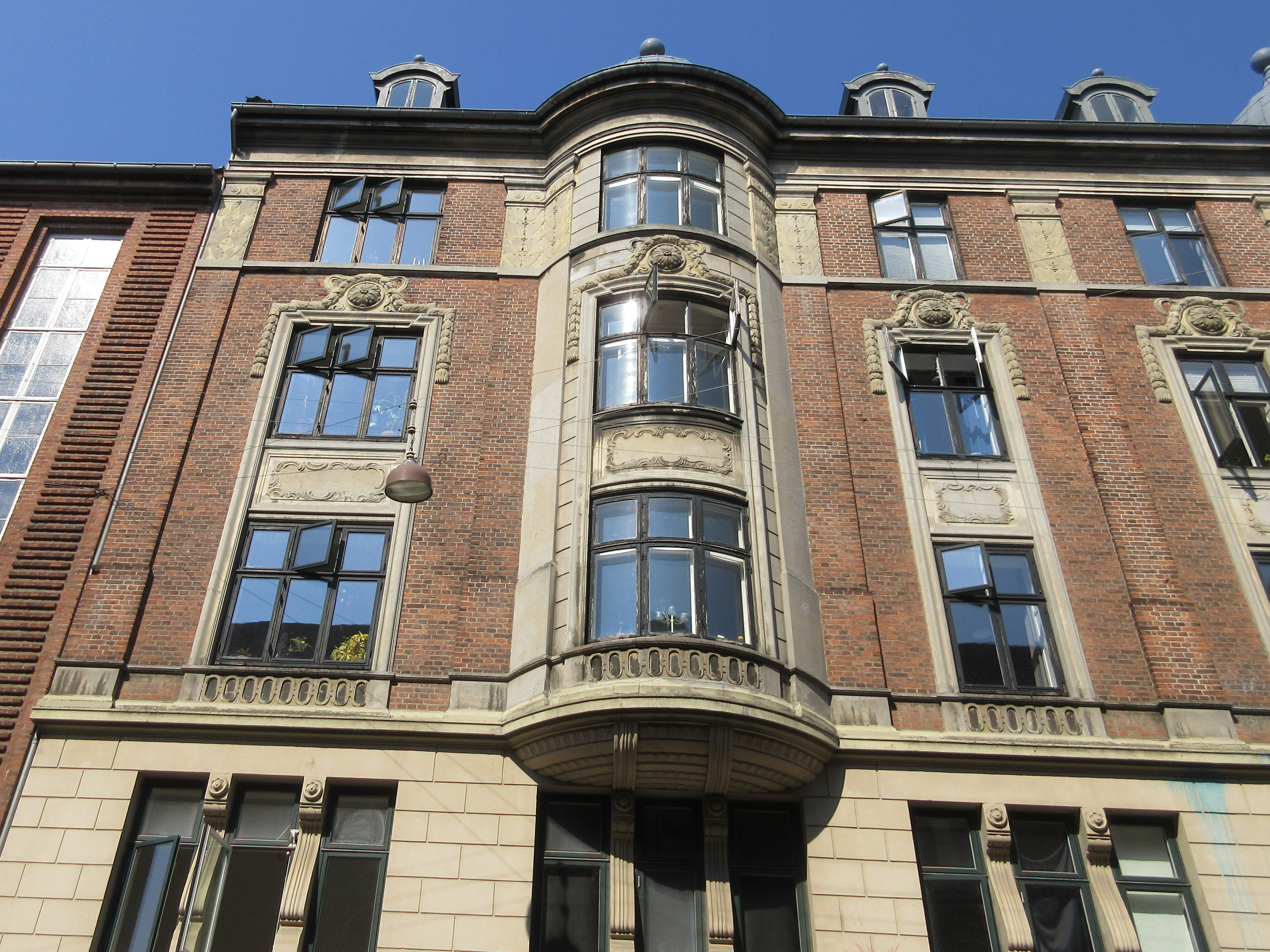
Blågårdsgade 4

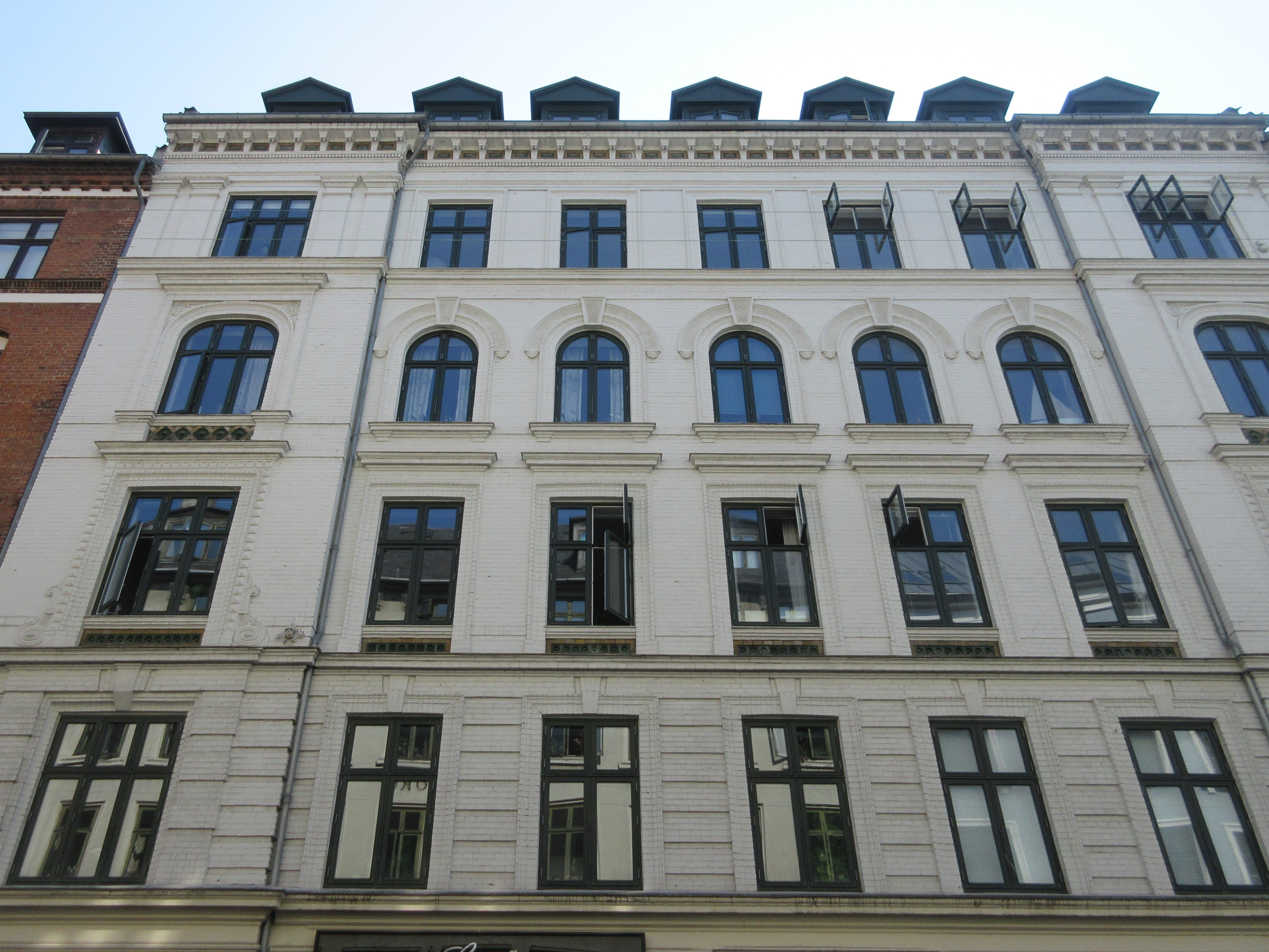
Blågårdsgade 17

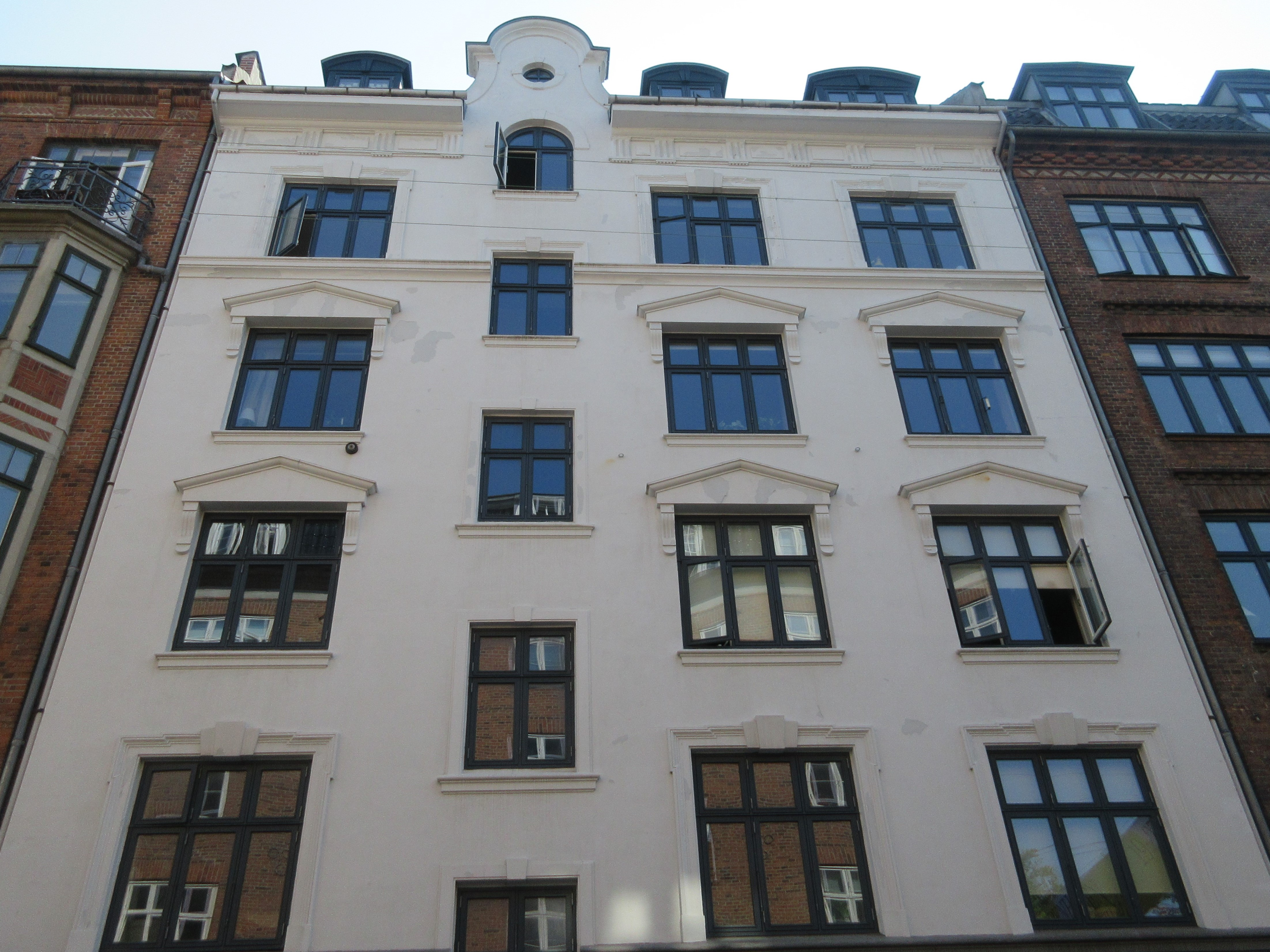
Bkågårdsgade 21
