= Blågård =

Former Danish historic country house

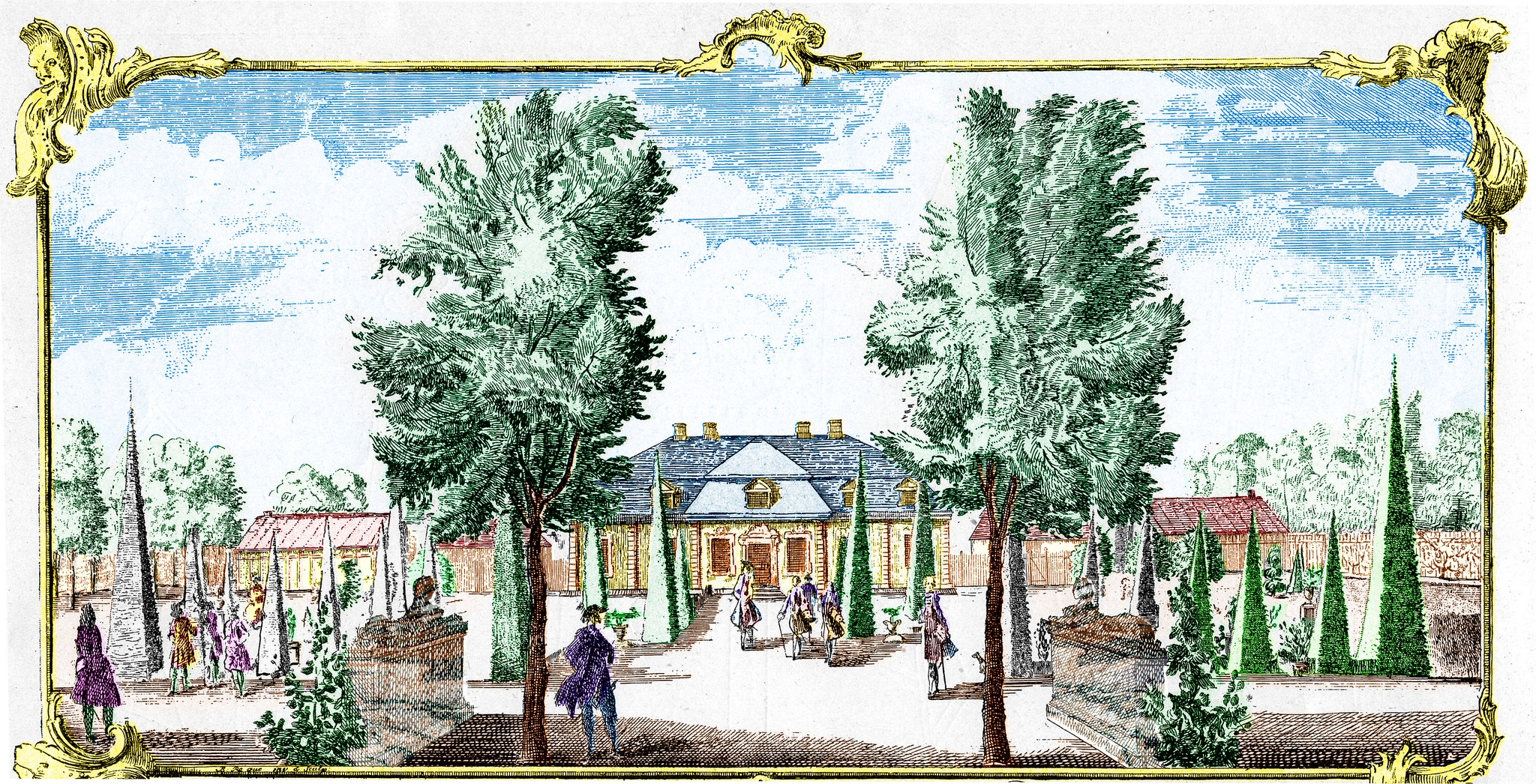
Blågård c. 1745

Blågård, also Blaagaard or Blågård Slot, was a royal country house near Peblinge Sø in what is now the Nørrebro district of Copenhagen, Denmark. Built in 1706 by Prince Charles of Denmark, in 1780 it was converted into a clothing factory before becoming a teacher training institution in 1791. After serving as a hospital in the early 19th century, in 1828 it became Nørrebro's first theatre until it was destroyed by fire in 1833. Today the name subsists in Blågårds Plads, Blågårdsgade and related developments in the area.

== Background ==
From the end of the 17th century, a park and a summer residence based on Italian traditions were developed just to the north of the former city limits of Copenhagen. In 1706 Prince Charles, the brother of King Frederick IV, acquired the estate where he soon built a one-storey country house with a mansard roof in the modern French style.

== Country house ==
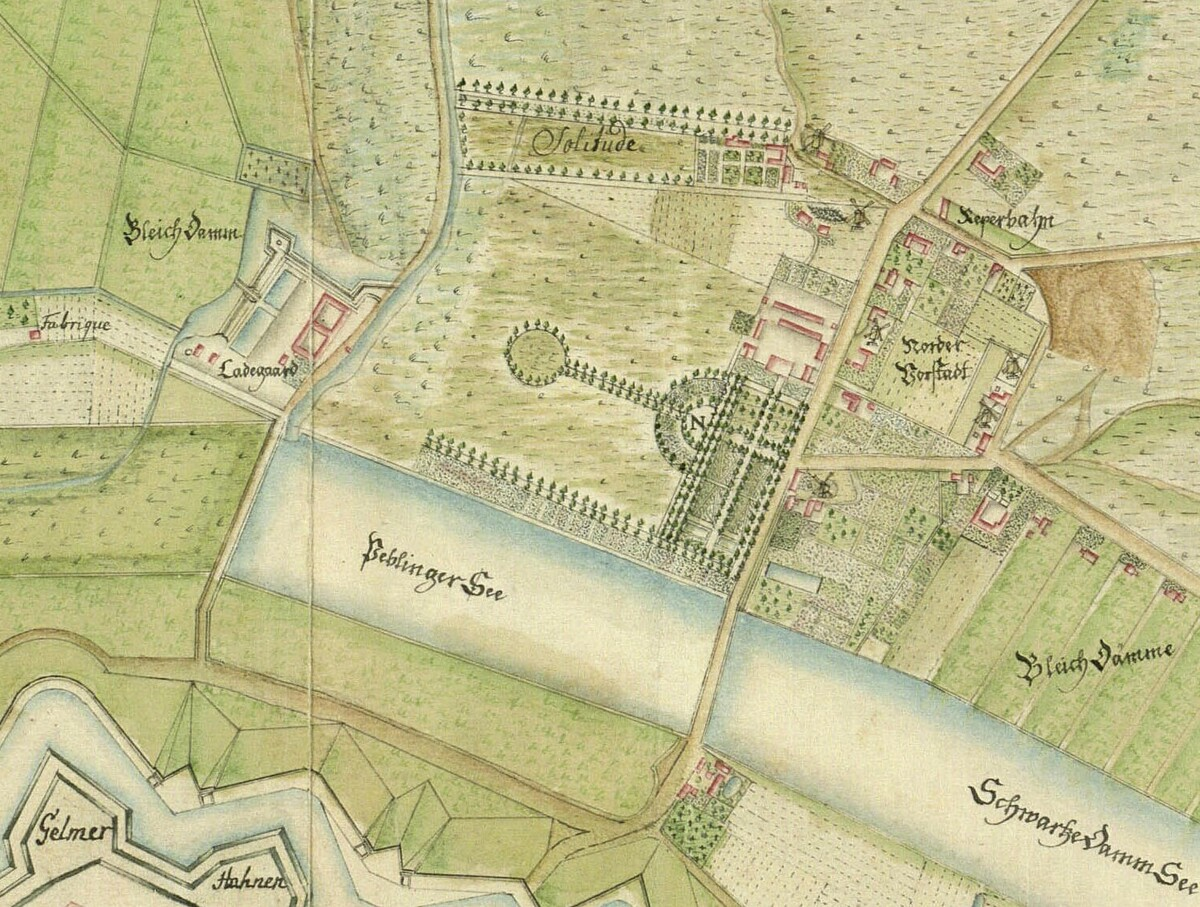
Blågård seen in a detail from Johan Friedrich Meyer's Frederik V's Atlas, 1742

The house overlooked the waters of Peblinge Sø with pavilions and gazebos in the surrounding park. Originally known simply as Prinsens Have (The Prince's Garden), the house was soon referred to as Blågård (literally Blue House) as a result of its blue-tiled roofs and the roofs of all the additional buildings. Today the name subsists in Blågårds Plads and related developments in the area.

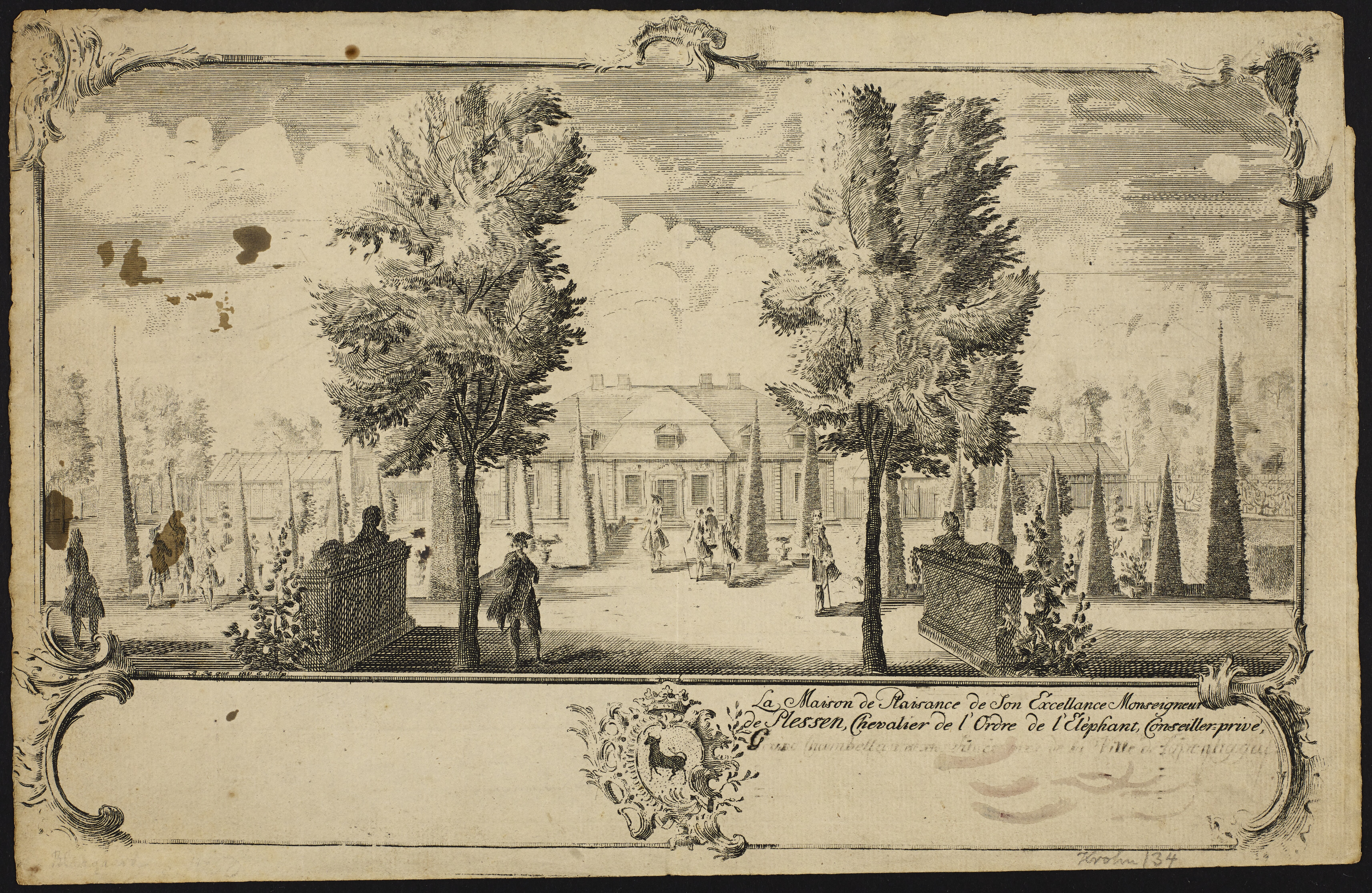
Bkågård in c. 1750.

In order to satisfy his interests in hunting and lavish entertaining, Prince Charles laid out a magnificent French Baroque garden with fountains, symmetrically positioned trees and fish ponds. The house itself had a conservatory or winter garden decorated with fine works of art and elegant furniture. There was also a prayer room with 35 Biblical pictures created by Hendrick Krock. With its two large glass doors, the lounge commanded fine views of the lakes and Copenhagen beyond.

== Later developments ==
When he died in 1729, Prince Charles left the estate to his sister Sophia Hedevig. She bequeathed Blågård outside to Carl Adolph von Plessen. Thereafter it passed into the hands of Count Conrad Holck, a favourite of King Christian VII. The king soon befriended a number of dancers from the Royal Danish Theatre, especially Støvlet-Cathrine, inviting them to stay at Blågård to take part in his festivities. In 1780, the building was converted for use as a clothing factory until in 1791 it became the first teacher training college in Denmark, known as Blågårds Seminarium. In 1807, the house was used as in infirmary for those wounded during the Bombardment of Copenhagen. The English seriously damaged the gardens, felling the trees for firewood.

In the 1820s, the former country house which had fallen into disrepair was acquired by Philippo Pettoletti from Venice who renovated it as a playhouse. He opened his Pantomimetheater in 1828, the first theatre in the Nørrebro area. His pantomime and circus presentations came to an abrupt end on 14 April 1893 when the building was completely destroyed by fire in 1833.

== See also ==
- Blågårds Plads

== Literature ==
- Jørgensen, Christoffer (2005), Ej blåt til lyst: fortællinger fra og omkring Blågården 1660-1833, Holkenfeldt, ISBN 9788791660061
- Source
