= Christoffer Harlang =

Danish architect

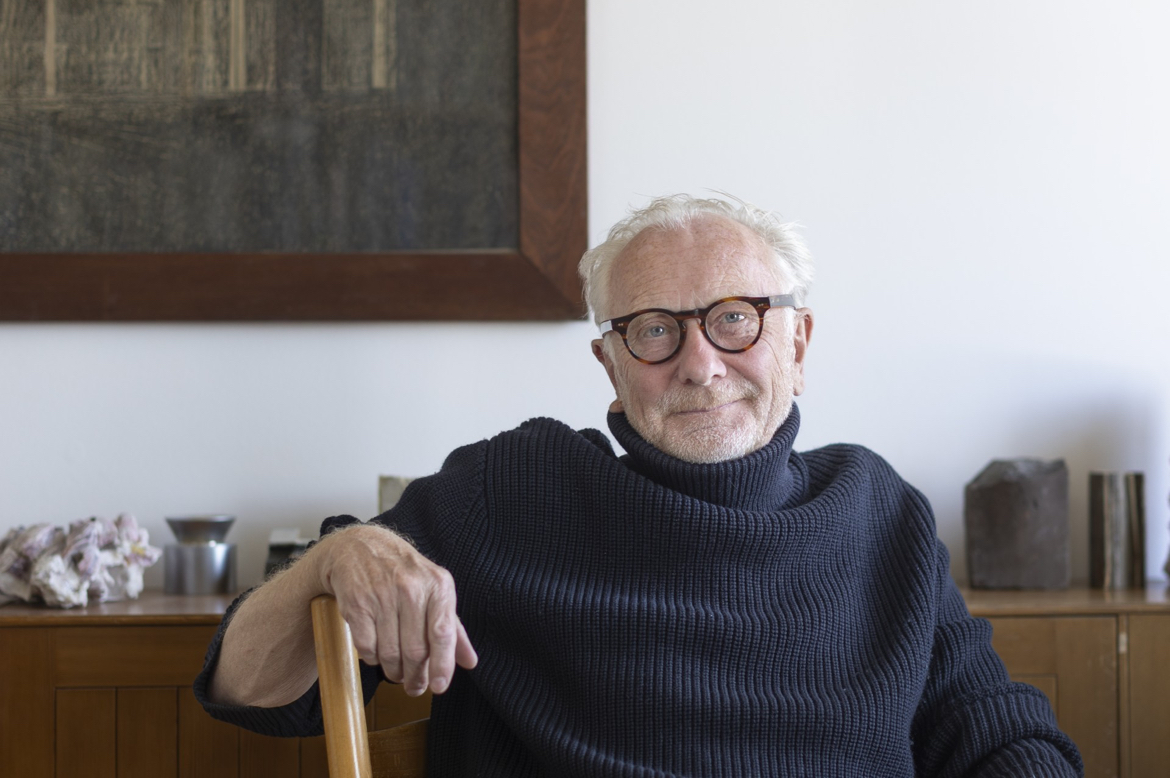
- Born: April 22, 1958 (age 68); Hellerup, Denmark
- Education: Royal Danish Academy of Fine Arts, School of Architecture; Architectural Association School of Architecture
- Father: Bent Harlang
- Family: Frantz Vilhelm Theodor Harlang (grandfather)Knud Sønderby
- Website: harlang.com

Christoffer Harlang (born 22 April 1958 in Hellerup, Denmark) is a Danish architect, designer and author and professor at the Royal Danish Academy of Fine Arts, School of Architecture.

== Career ==
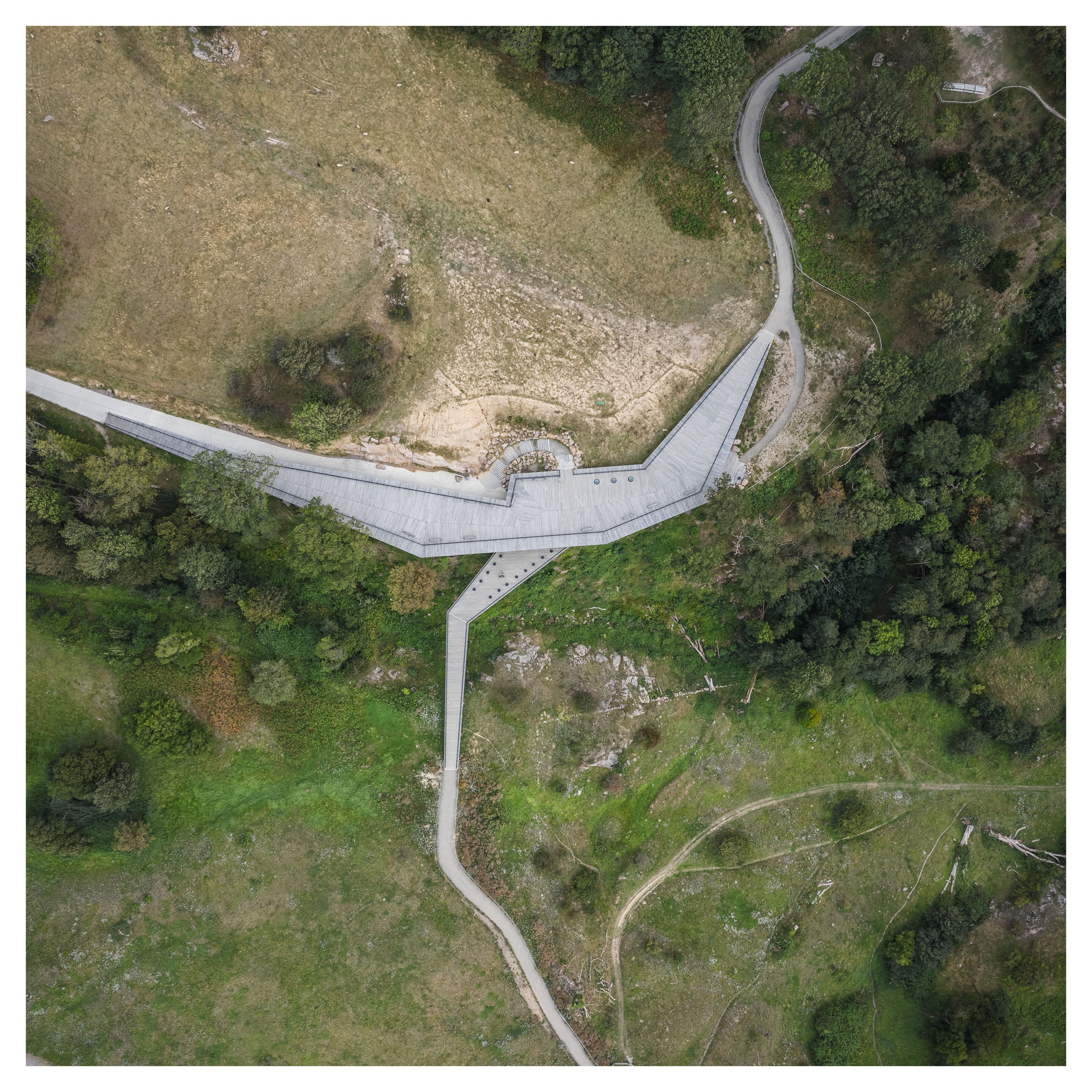
Hammershus + Christoffer Harlang

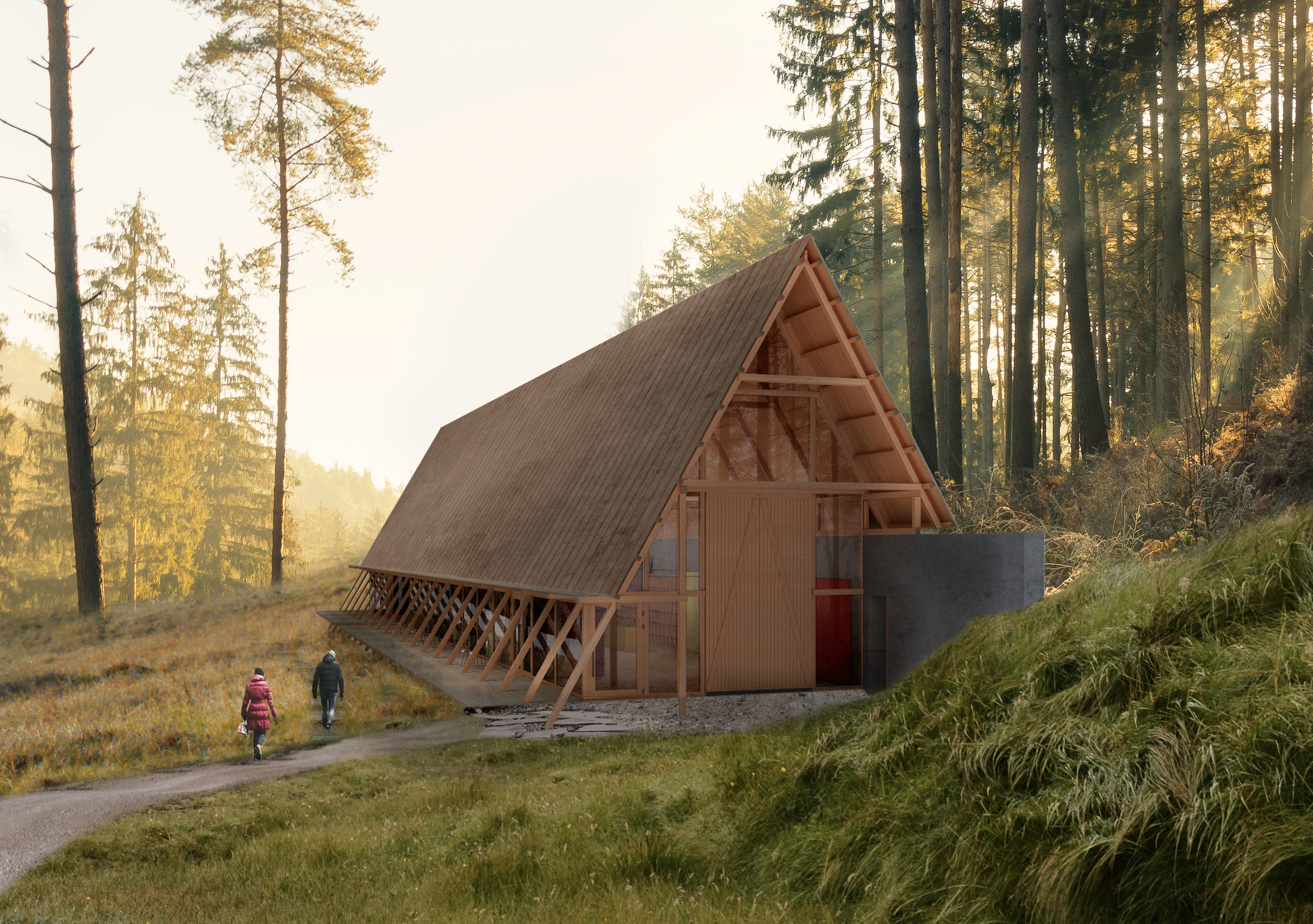
Regan Vest Visitors Centre in collaboration with Fogh & Følner 2019

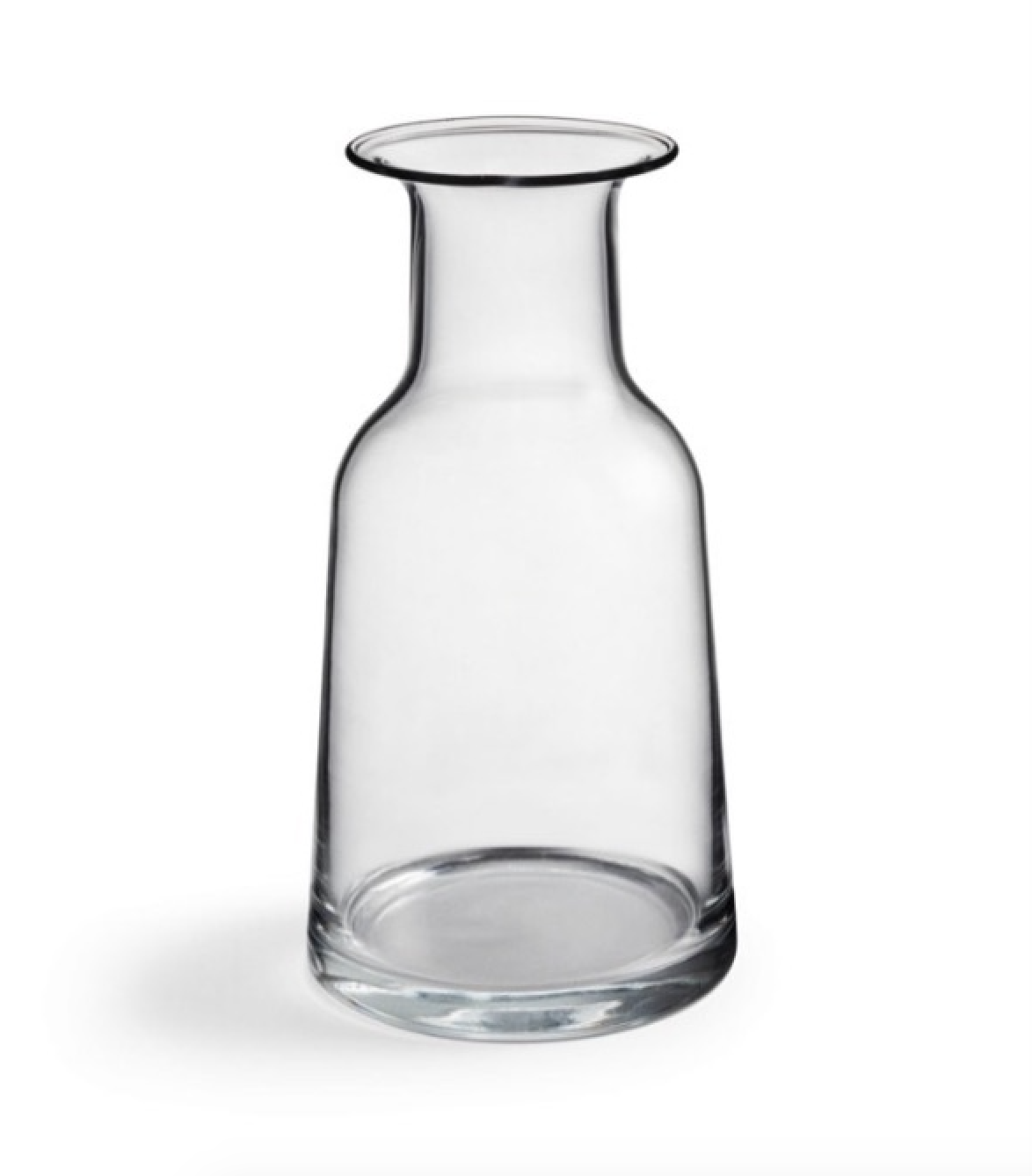
Hammer Decanter Christoffer Harlang Skagerak Denmark

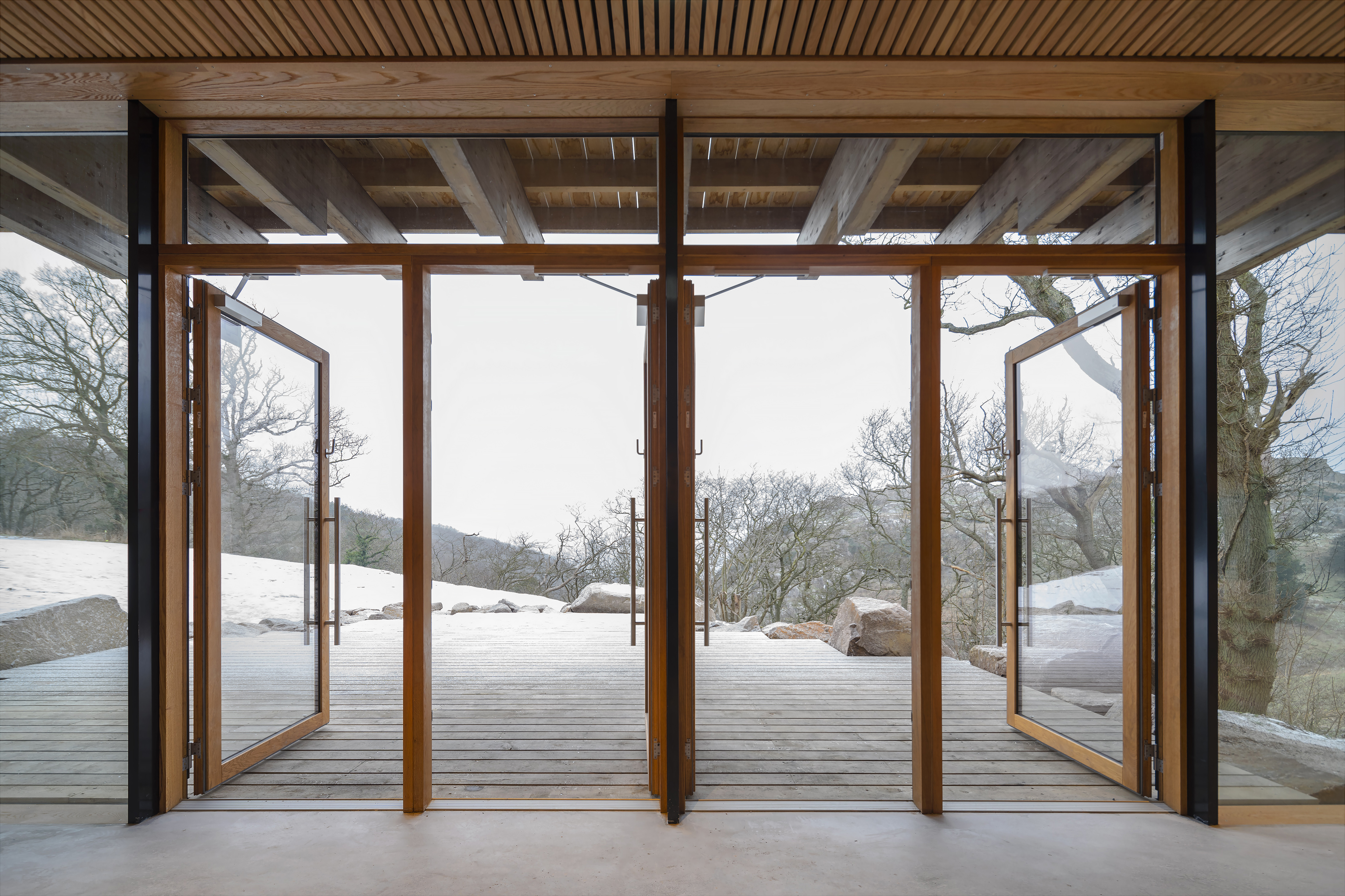
Hammershus Besøgscenter Interior

Harlang graduated from the Royal Danish Academy of Fine Arts School of Architecture Kunstakademiets Arkitektskole in Copenhagen 1983 and studied for some years in London at the Architectural Association and in Rome at the Accademia di Danimarca and later became a Ph.D. in architecture on a dissertation on Nordic modernism. Shortly after his education, he joined Professor Erik Christian Sørensens studio at the Royal Academy of Fine Arts Kunstakademiets Arkitektskole as a teacher. He worked at Henning Larsen's office Henning Larsens Tegnestue for some years and established in 1992 his own design studio, Christoffer Harlang Architects. He has received 1st, 2nd and 3rd prizes in Danish and international architectural competitions. Has built a studio for artistist Milena Bonifancini in 2006, single-family houses, holiday homes and Hotel Ottilia at Carlsberg.

He has designed furniture and products for Skagerak, Randi, Bent Brandt A / S and Louis Poulsen, including the cutlery series Harlang and the Clavis door handle.

Harlang won in 2013 in collaboration with Arkitema Architects the international shortlisted competition for a new visitor center at Hammershus Castle Ruin on the isle of Bornholm in Denmark. The building was inaugurated in 2018 and has since received a large number of Danish and international architectural awards, including the Carpenters' Guild's Architecture Award, the Insitu Award and the World Festival of Architecture Exhibition Building of the Year. Hammershus Visitor Center was nominated for the world's leading architecture award EU Mies van der Rohe Award 2019.

Harlang acts as an advisor to private and public companies and foundations. Since 2008, he has been professor in architecture heading the Institute of Cultural Heritage, Transformation and Restoration at the Royal Academy of Fine Arts School of Architecture.

Harlang is the author of a number of books and magazine articles on Nordic architecture and design in particular. In 2004-2007, he was chairman of the board of the Danish Arts Foundation and has held several positions of trust within his profession, including chairman of the Cultural Heritage Committee set up by the Ministry of Culture since 2007. He is on the board of directors of the Royal Danish Academy of Arts and of Halldor Gunnløgssons Foundation.

In 2020, Harlang was awarded Nykredit's Honorary Prize in Architecture, which is given to a person who has made a special contribution to Danish architecture.

Christoffer Harlang is the son of furniture manufacturer Bent Harlang (1925-1998) and grandson of advertising director and philanthropist Frantz Harlang (1899-1981).
