= Hotel Ottilia =

Luxury hotel in Copenhagen, Denmark

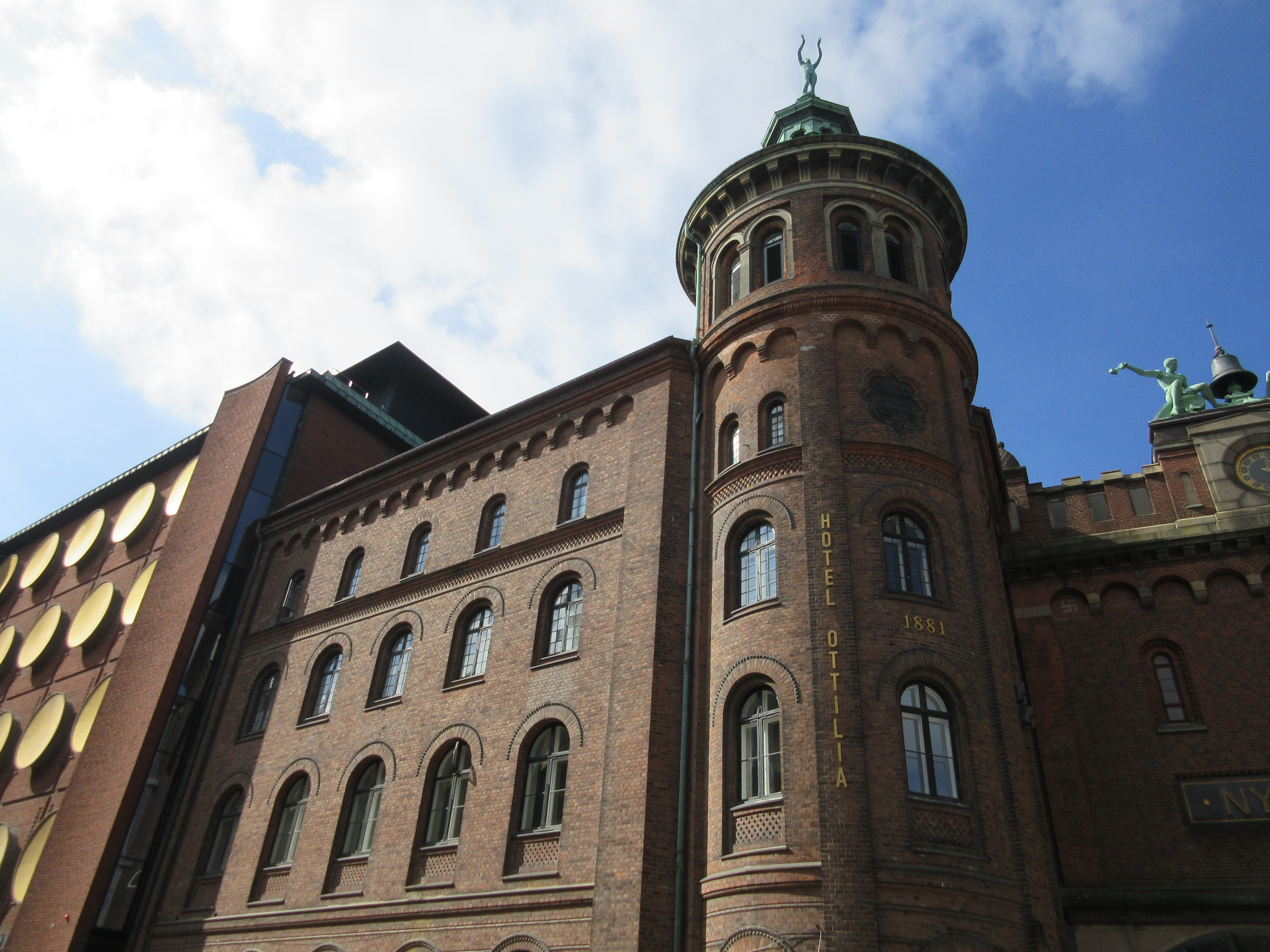

General information
- Location: Copenhagen, Denmark
- Coordinates: 55°40′01″N 12°31′00″E
- Opening: 2018; 8 years ago
- Owner: Brøchner Hotels

Design and construction
- Architect: Vilhelm Dahlerup

Other information
- Number of rooms: 155
- Number of suites: 4

Hotel Ottilia is a 155-room boutique hotel operated by Brøchner Hotels in two former brewery buildings in the Carlsberg area of Copenhagen, Denmark. The older building, known as the Malt Chamber, is from 1881 and was designed by Vilhelm Dahlerup. The other one, Storage Cellar 3, was built to a Functionalist design in 1969. Both buildings are listed in the Danish registry of protected buildings and places. The hotel opened in 2019. It takes its name after Ottilia Jacobsen, the wife of second generation Carlsberg brewer Carl Jacobsen.

== History ==
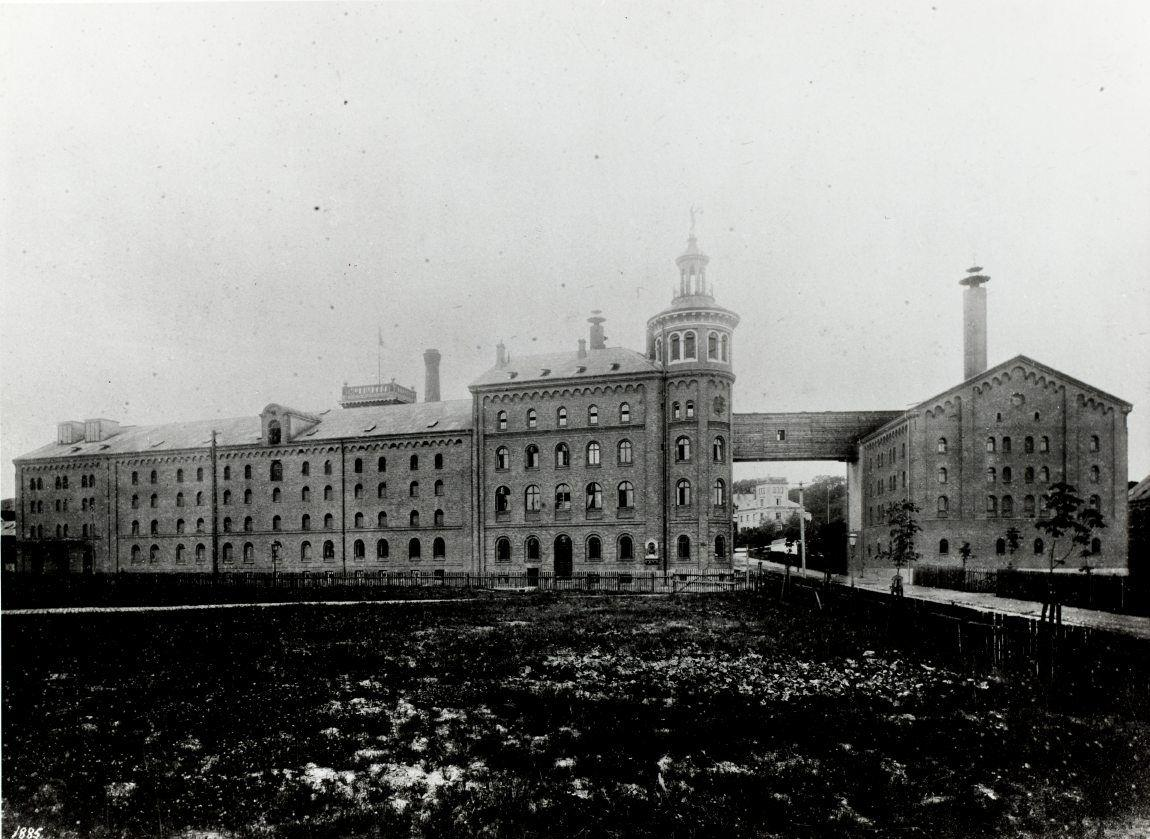
The old part of the building in c. 1885. The section to the left was demolished in 1969 to make way for Storage Cellar 3.

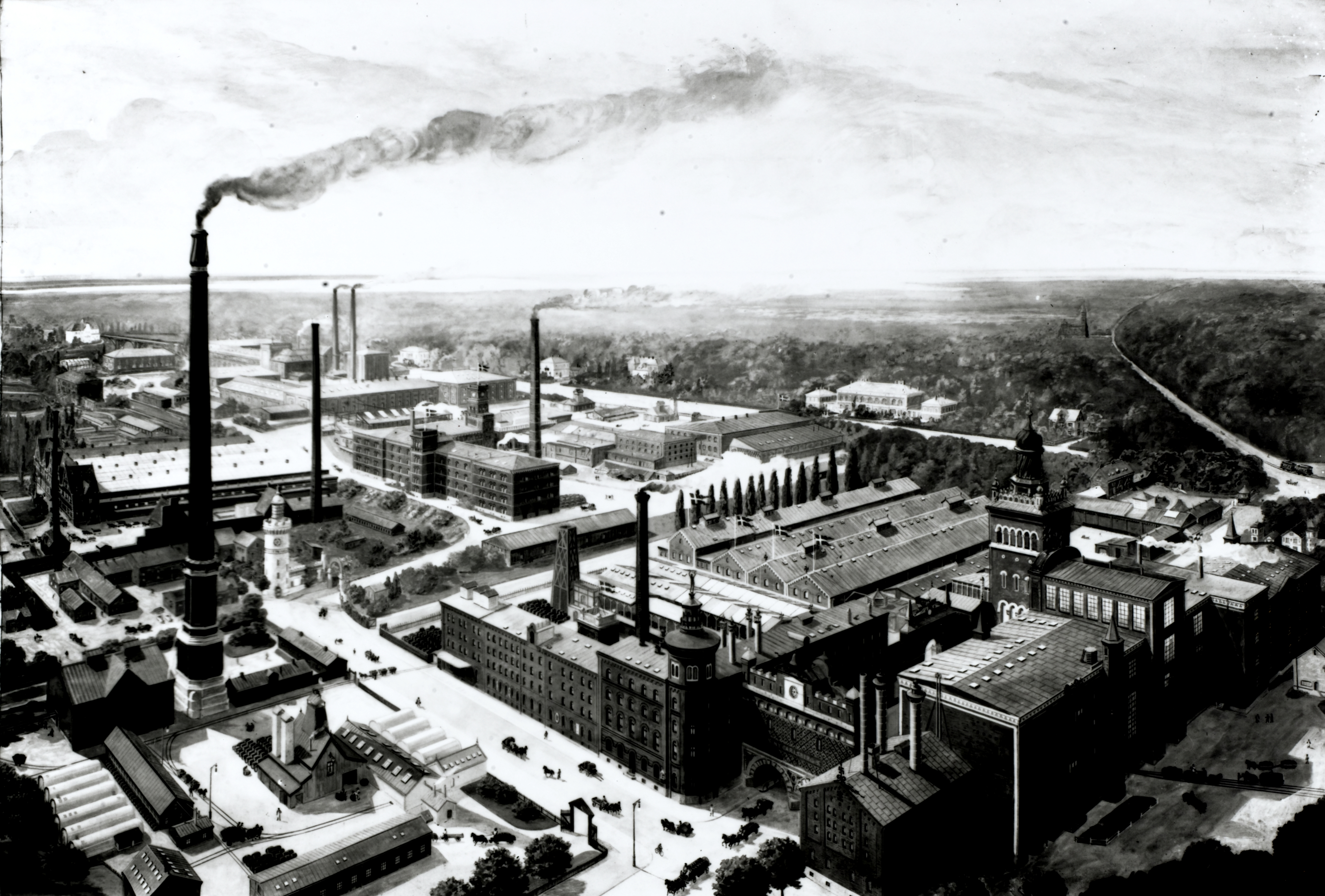
The building in 1909

In 1870, J. C. Jacobsen's Carlsberg Brewery was extended with an annexed brewery, which was leased by J. C. Jacobsen's son Carl Jacobsen after disagreements with his father. In 1880, J. C. Jacobsen terminated his son's lease and Carl founded his own brewery on a neighbouring premises. With his father's consent he named it Ny Carlsberg (New Carlsberg), while Carlsberg's name was changed to Gammel Carlsberg (English: Old Carlsberg).

The oldest of the two buildings in which the hotel is now based is from 1881. It was used both as brewhouse, machine house and malt storage. The tower at the corner with Pasteursvej was a watertower. The adjacent part of the building contained residences for unmarried brewery workers. Living at the brewery enabled them to serve as fire guards. A new Ny Carlsberg Brewhouse was in 1901 completed on the other side of Ny Carlsbergvej.

The newer of the two buildings in which the hotel is based is known as Storage Celler 3 (Lagerkælder 3). It was constructed in 1969. The building replaced an older building at the site. It had room for 6 million litres of beer. The tanks were removed in 1995 and the building was then used as archives and storage space.

== Architecture ==
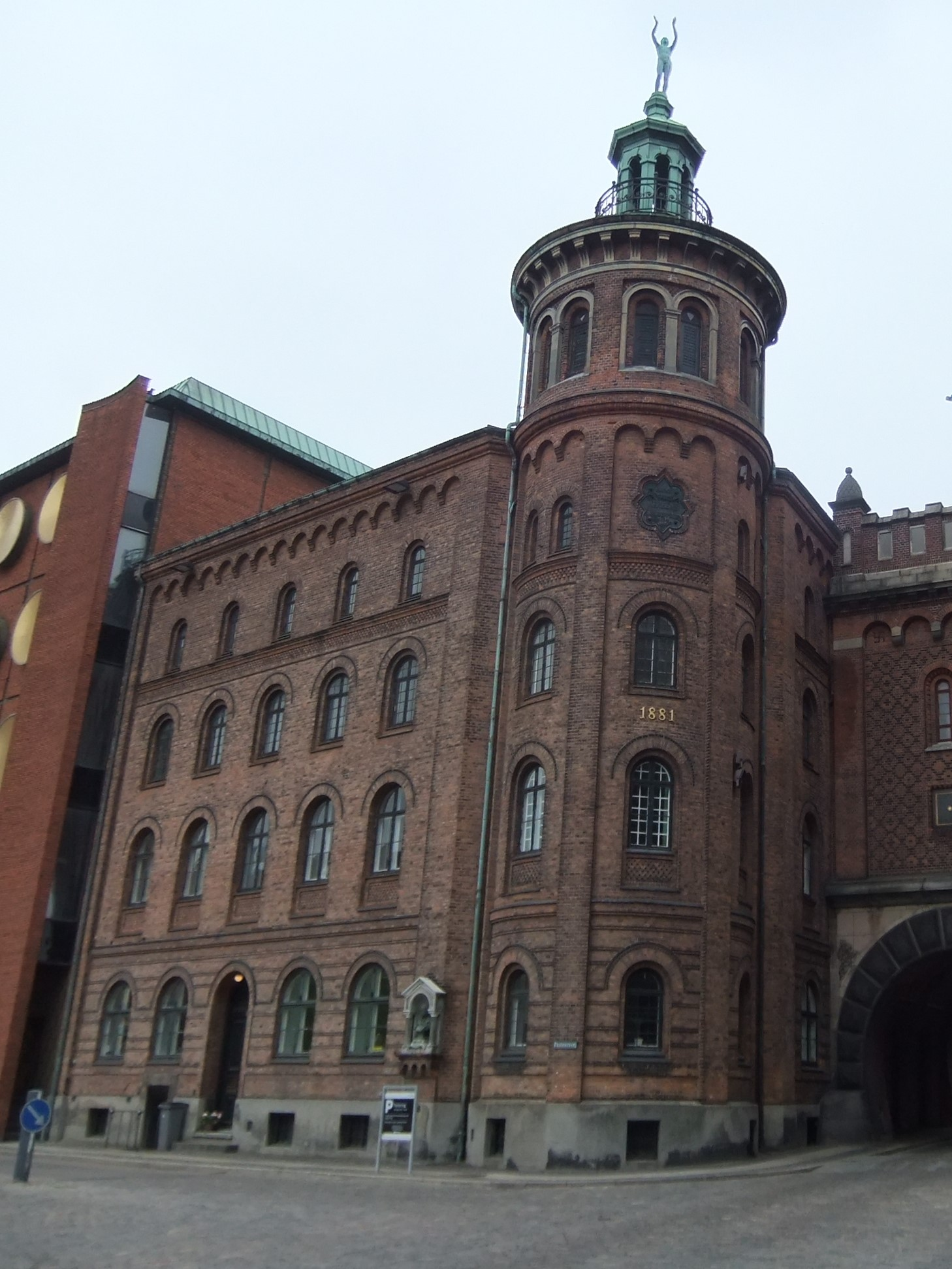
Dahlerup's building from 1881

The old part of the building is constructed in red brick with arched windows, and a Lomvard band is seen under the roof. The tower is topped by a tall roof lantern crowned by a copy of the Ancient Greek statue Praying Boy (original in Altes Museum).

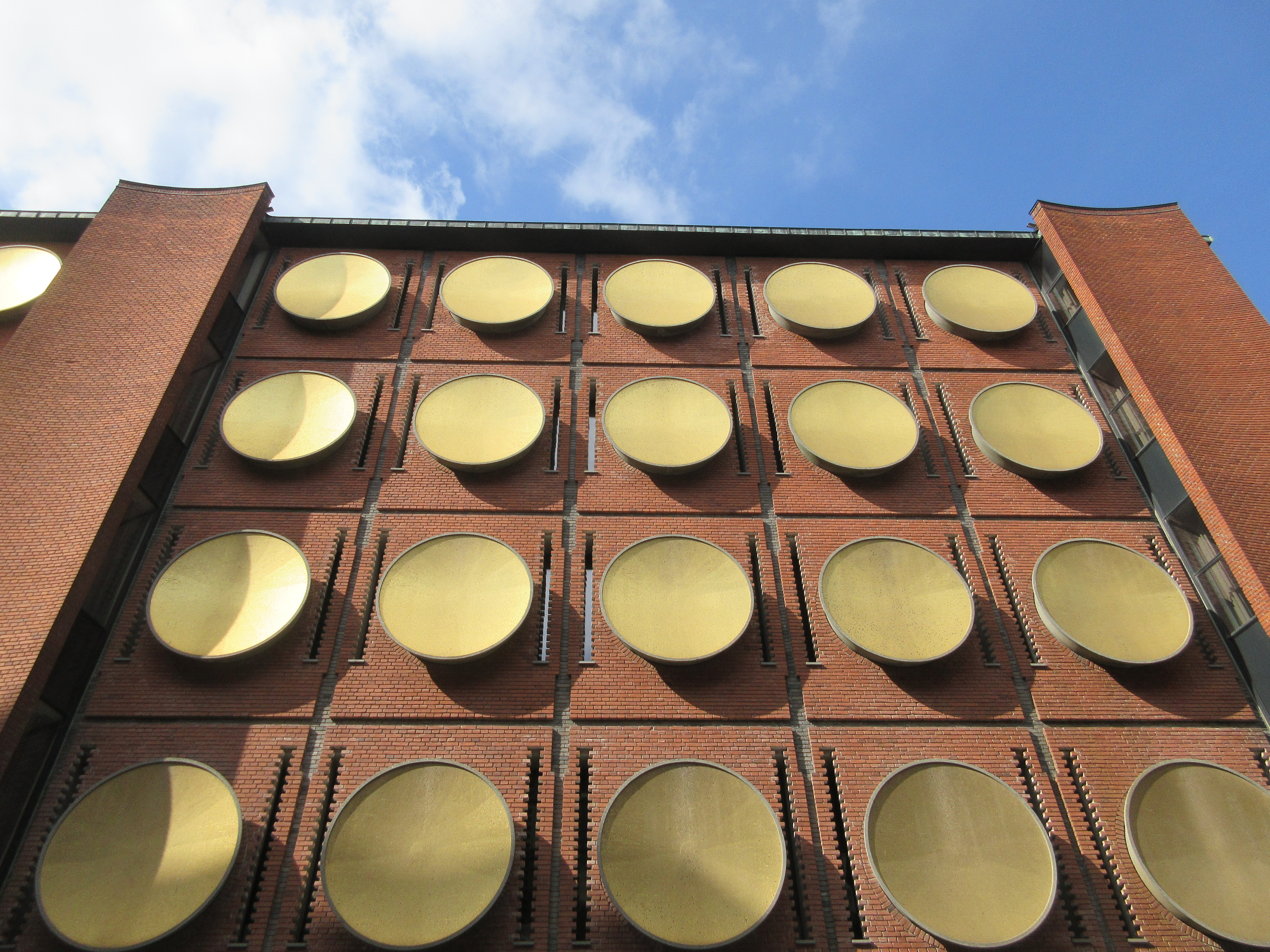
Storeage Cellar 3 under conversion into its new use

Storage Cellar 3 was designed by Svenn Eske Kristensen. The facade towards Pasteursvej is dominated by 60 golden mosaic discs in 5 rows, representing the horizontally placed, cylindrical tanks (with golden beer) with the same diameter that were originally located on the other side of the wall.

The buildings were adapted for their new use as hotel by Poul Schülein from Arkitema Architects in collaboration with professor Christoffer Harlang from the Royal Danish Academy of Fine Arts. The challenge of letting daylight into Storage Cellar 3 towards Pasteursvej was solved by creating tall, narrow windows on each side of the discs. On the other side of the building, towards Bryggernes Plads, each of the discs were complemented by shallow, round niches in the brickwork. These have been replaced by round windows.

=== Busts ===
The groundfloor of the building features a number of busts on its facade. The people seen on the facade of the old building include Louis Pasteur (by Paul Dubois), Gabriel Sedlmayr (by Ferdinand Miller) and Emil Christian Hansen (Nicolai Outzen Schmidt). The bust on the facade of Storage Cellar 3 depicts a number of members of the Jacobsen family, including I. C. Jacobsen, Carl Jacobsen and Ottilia Jacobsen. They were originally located on the building that was demolished in 1969 but transferred to the new one.

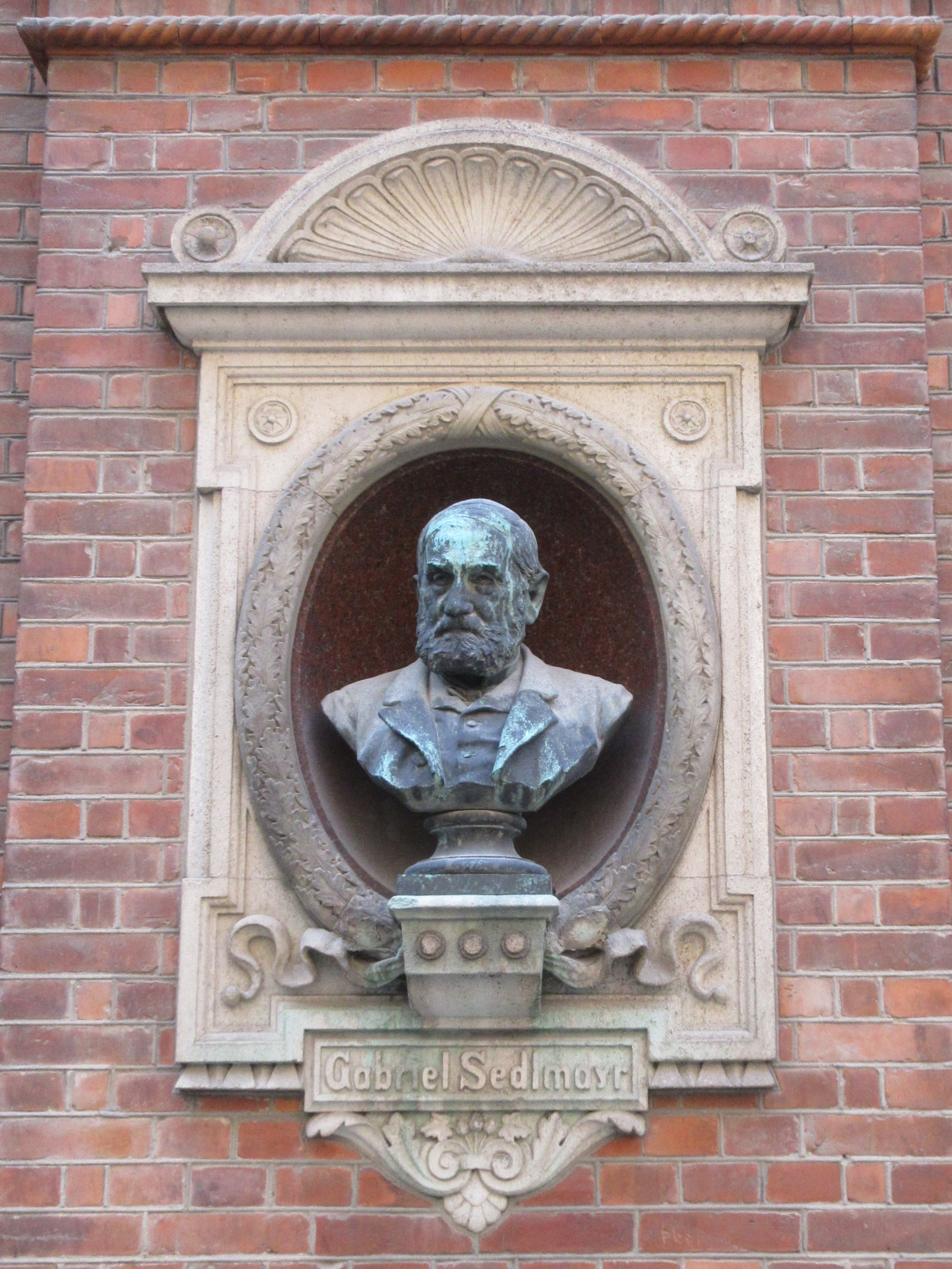
Gabriel Sedlmayr

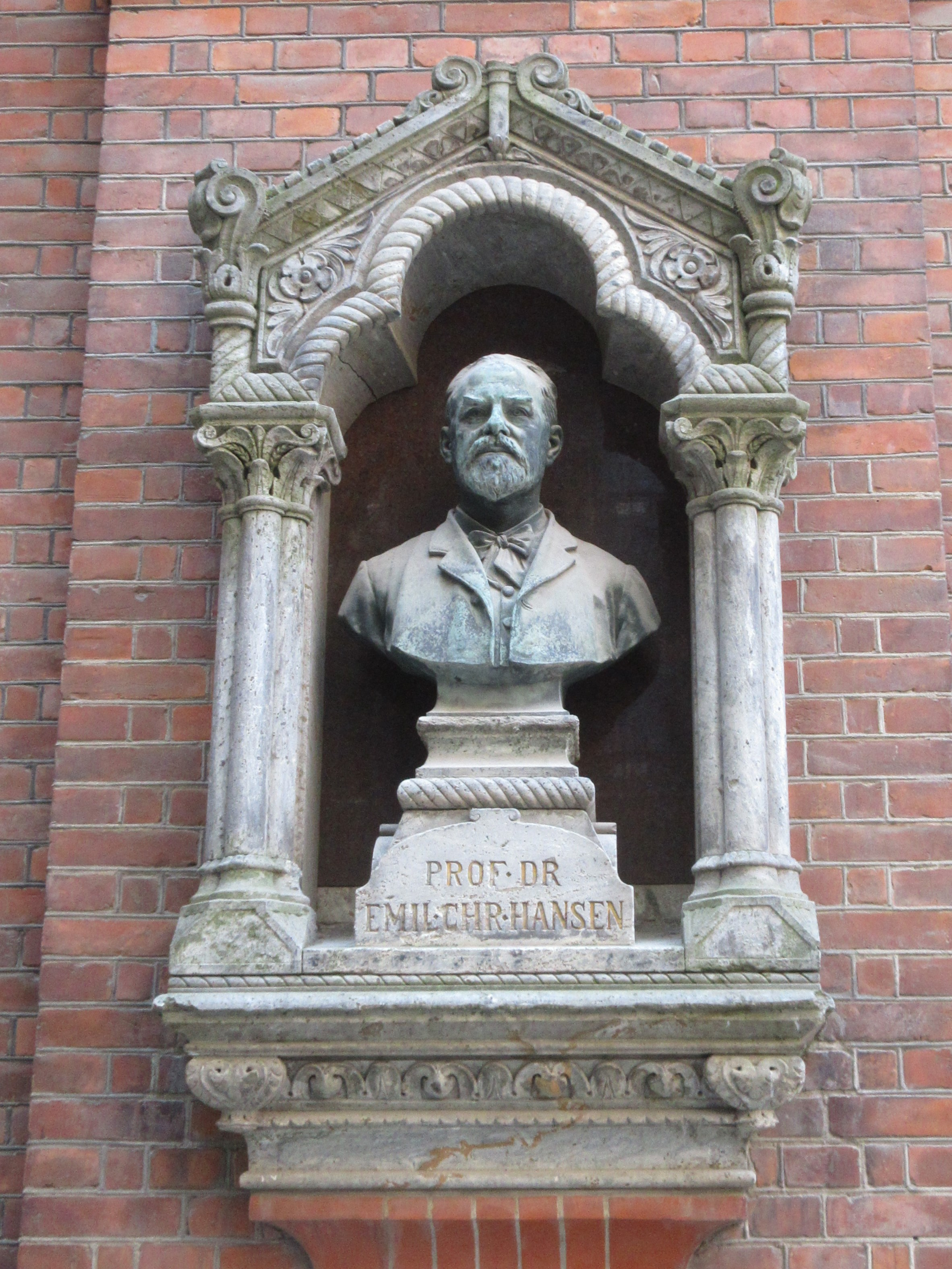
Emil Christian Hansen

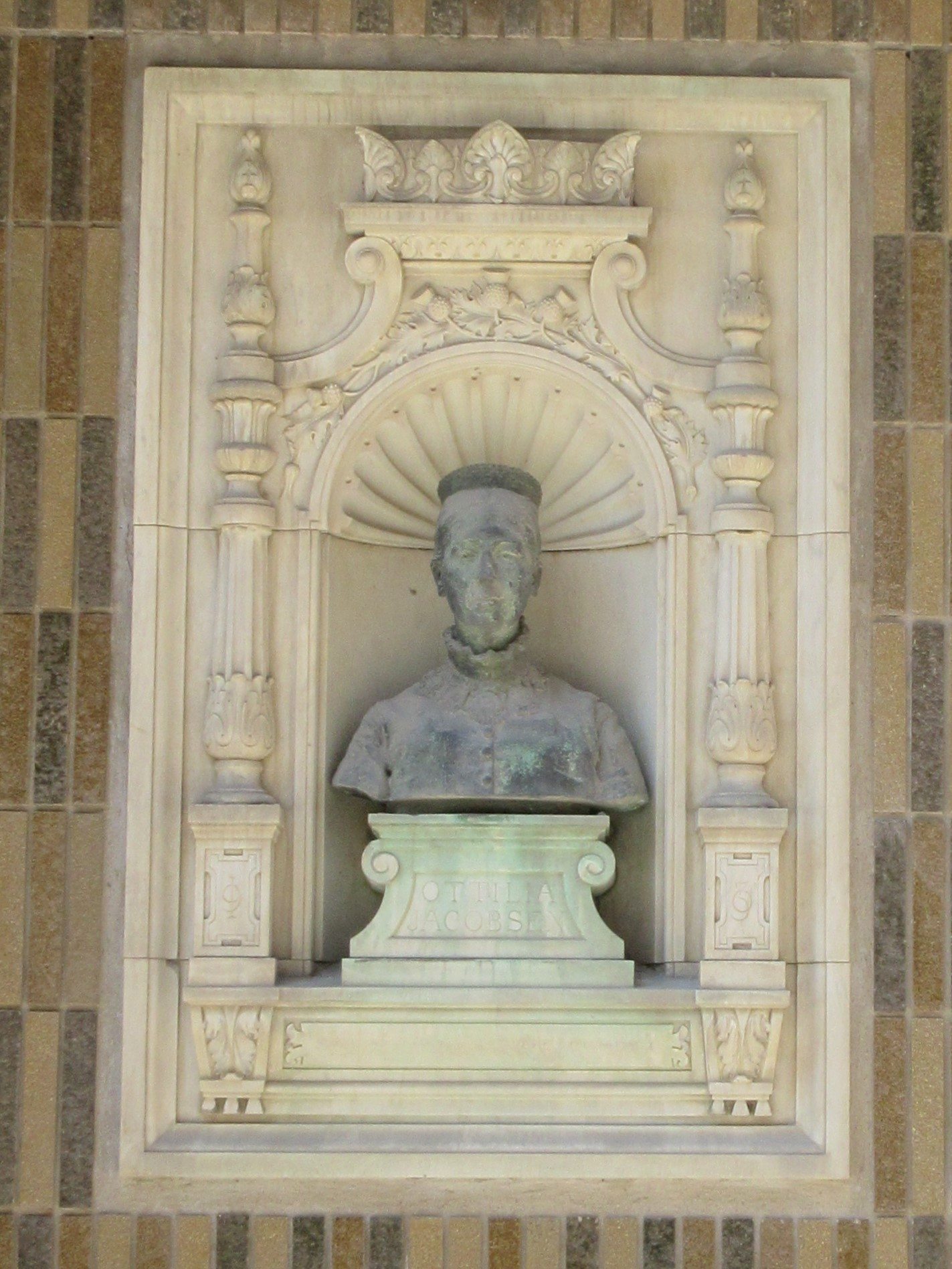
Ottilia Jacobsen

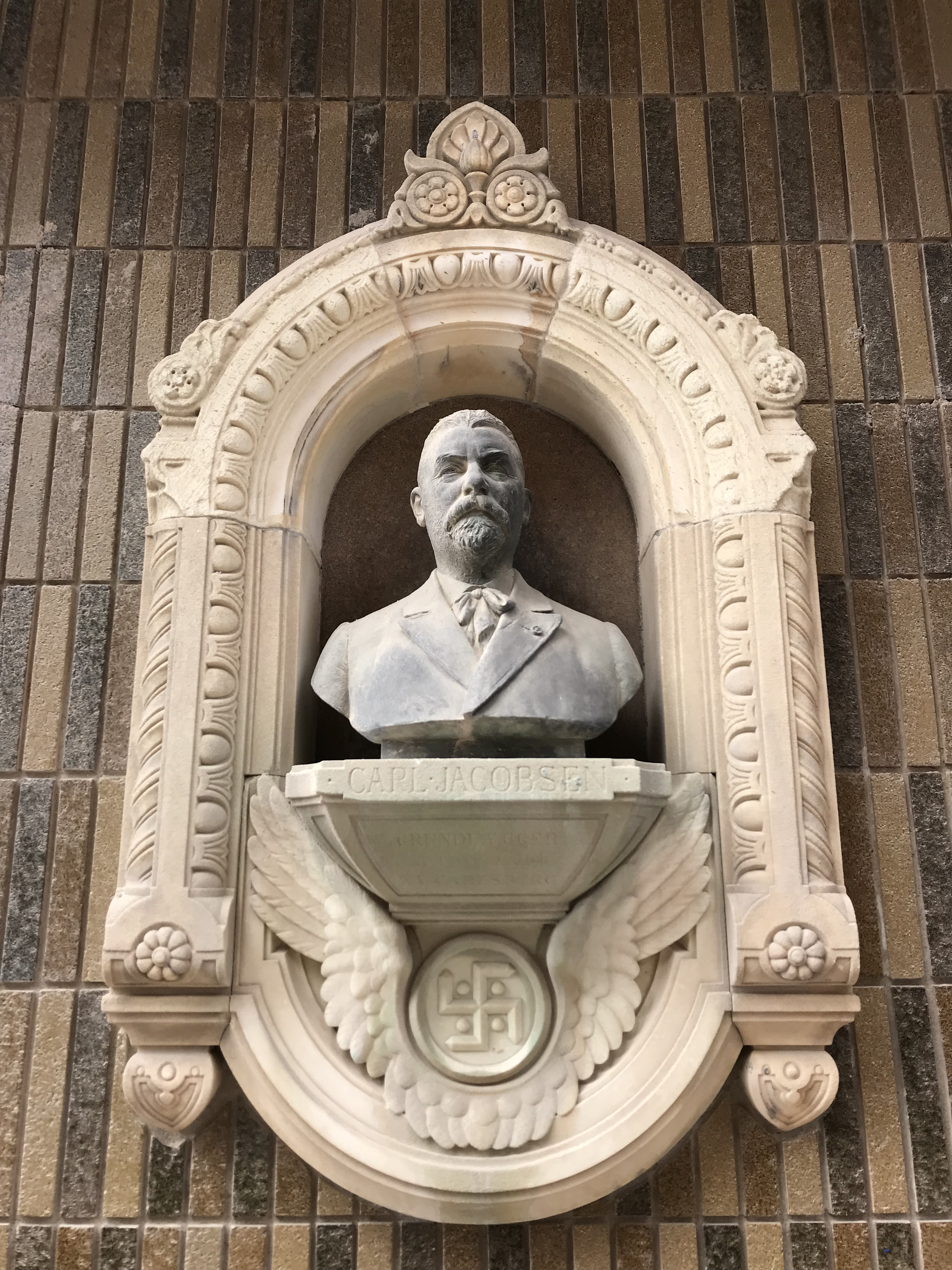
Carl Jacobsen

== The hotel ==
The hotel has 155 rooms, including 4 suites in the corner tower. Facilities include conference facilities, two bars, ground floor café and a rooftop restaurant and terrace overlooking Copenhagen.
