= Brøchner Hotels =

Hotel operator

- Type: Private
- Industry: Hotel
- Founded: 1982
- Headquarters: Copenhagen, Denmark
- Number of locations: 6 hotels
- Key people: Nickolas Krabbe Bjerg (CEO), Søren Brøchner-Mortensen (Owner and Director of Business Development)

Brøchner Hotels is a hotel group based in Copenhagen, Denmark. It operates four boutique hotels in Copenhagen.

== History ==
Brøchner Hotels was founded in 1982 when Einer Honoré bought 50-room Hotel Kong Arthur for his daughter and son-in-law Søster and Hans Brøchner-Mortensen who then gave up their jobs as nurse and carpenter to run the hotel. Hotel Kong Arthur was expanded to 107 rooms in 1989 and with new conference facilities in 1992. Brøchner-Mortensen bought Ibsens Hotel at the corner of Frederiksborggade and Nansensgade in 1997 and expanded it the following year.

In 2009, Hans and Søster Brøchner-Mortensen passed the company on to their children Søren and Kirsten Brøchner-Mortensen. In 2013, Søren and his wife Mette Brøchner-Mortensen acquired full ownership of the existing company while Hotel Kong Arthur and Ibsens Hotel were transferred to the new company Arthur Hotels owned by Kirsten Brøchner-Mortensen.

Karim Nielsen served as group CEO from 2010 to 2019. In 2018, Brøchner Hotels opened Hotel Herman K in a former distribution substation at Bremerholm 6 in downtown Copenhagen. It was Brøchner Hotels' first 5 star hotel. Hotel Ottilia opened in 2019 in two historic buildings in Carlsberg's former brewery site in Vesterbro. It was followed by BOOK, a hostel located inside the former main library in Aarhus.

In 2020, Brøchner Hotels was hit hard by the COVID-19 pandemic. In May 2020, Brøchner Hotels gave up the management of Hotel Herman K. In January 2021, Brøchner Hotels also had to give up the management of Hotel Astoria.

== Hotels and hostels ==
=== Hotels and hostels ===
Copenhagen

- Hotel Danmark
- Hotel SP34
- Hotel Ottilia
- Hotel Hans
- Ottilia Heritage
- SP34 Apartments

=== Former hotels ===
- Hotel Astoria
- Hotel Herman K
- BOOK1 Design Hostel (opened 2020 in Aarhus / closed in 2024).
