= Møllegade =

Street in Copenhagen Municipality, Denmark

Coordinates: 55.6920°N 12.5578°E

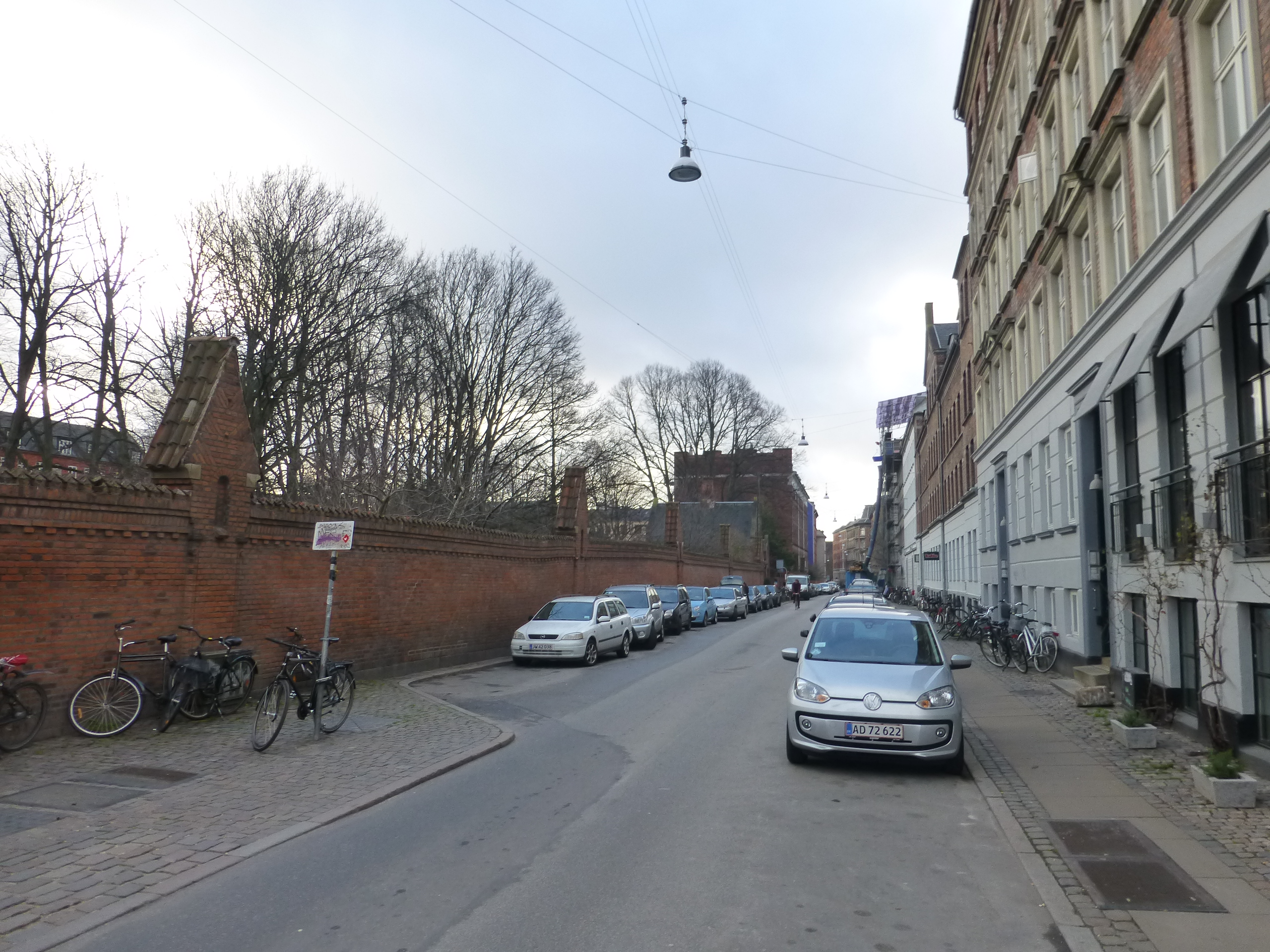
Møllegade.

Møllegade (lit. 'Mill Street') is a street in the Nørrebro district of Copenhagen, Denmark. It runs from Nørrebrogade in the southwest to Nørre Allé in the northeast. Copenhagen's Jewish Northern Cemetery has its entrance on the south side of the street and De Gamles By is located on its north side.

== History ==
The street is one of the oldest road stretches in Nørrebro. It was part of the original Jagtvej which was created shortly after the construction of Ladegården in 1620 to provide royal hunting parties with easy access to Store Vibenshus from where they followed the Eoyal Frederiksborg Road north to Jægersborg Dyrehave or Frederiksborg Castle in North Zealand.

The lower part of the road later became known as Jødevej (Jew Road) due to the location of the Jewish Cemetery. In 1831, it was one of only three side roads to Nørrebrogade. The upper part of the street was called Sandgravsvej ("Sand Pit Road") due to a number of sand pits located where De Gamles By is today. The sand was for instance used for white-washing of floors. The road received its current name in 1858.

== Notable buildings and residents ==
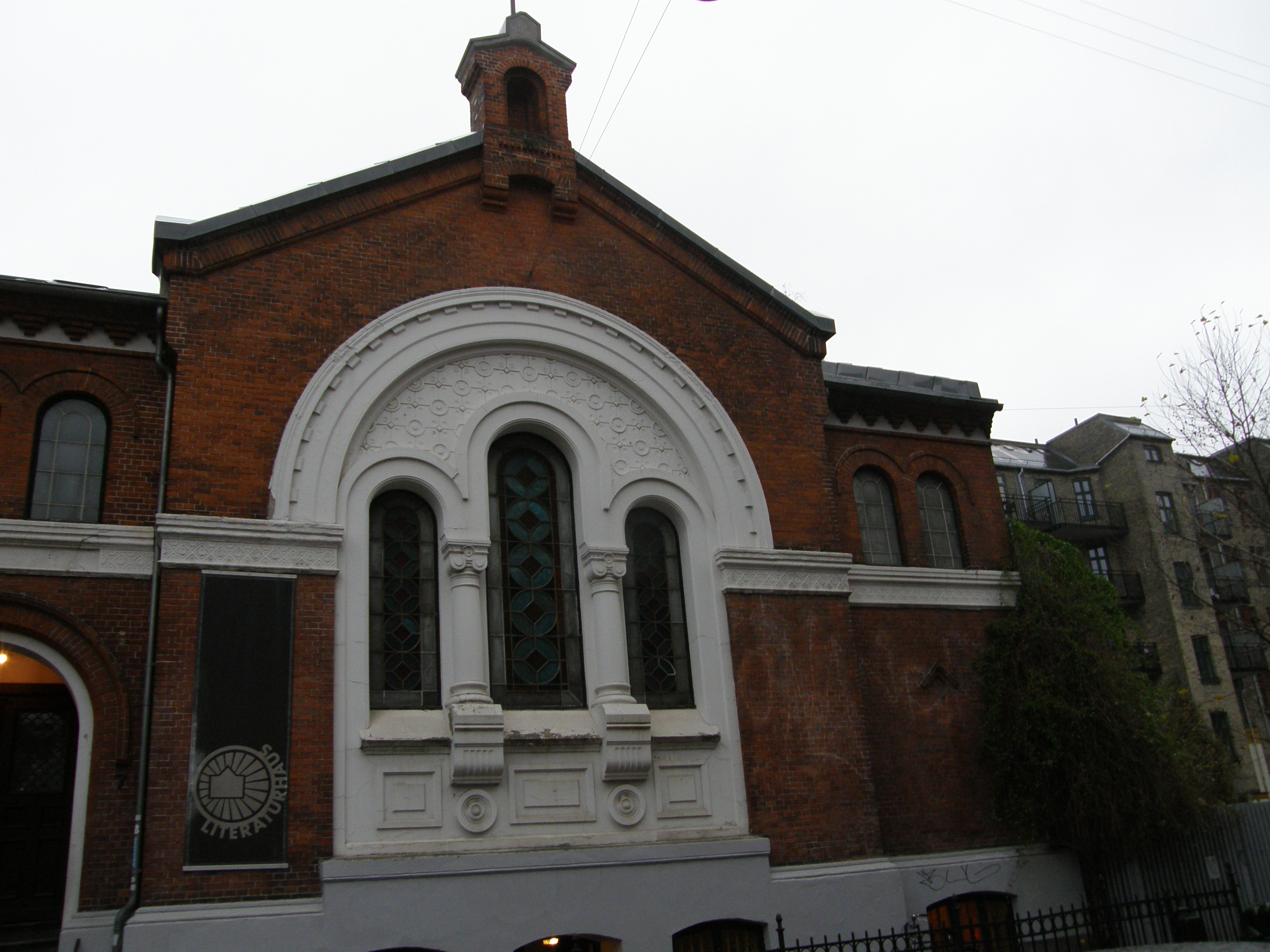
No. 7: LiteraturHaus

LiteraturHaus (No. 7) is a meeting place for aspiring writers, artists and other people with an interest in literature. The building is a former Methodist church, Bethania Church, which was built in 1892 to design by the architects Henrik Hagemann and Knud Arne Petersen. LiteraturHaus opened in April 2005 with inspiration from similar venues in Germany.

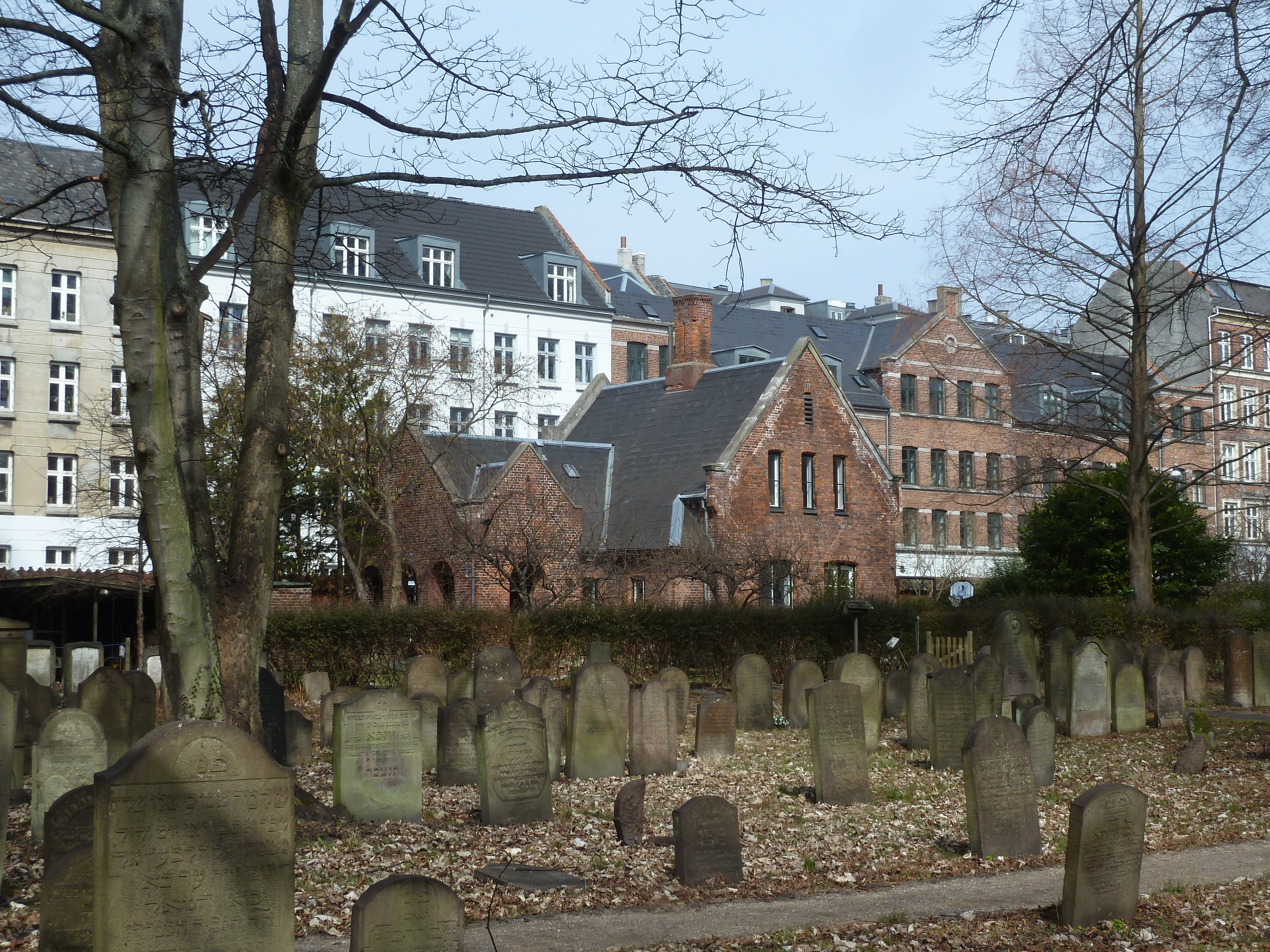
No. 12. The Jewish Cemetery with the gatehouse on Møllegade

The Jewish Cemetery (Mp. 12) was established at the site in the 1690s. The brick wall which today surrounds the cemetery on three sides, along Møllegade, Guldbergsgade and Birkegade, was built in 1873 to a design by Vilhelm Tvede. The entrance is on Møllegade. The cemetery was listed in 1983.

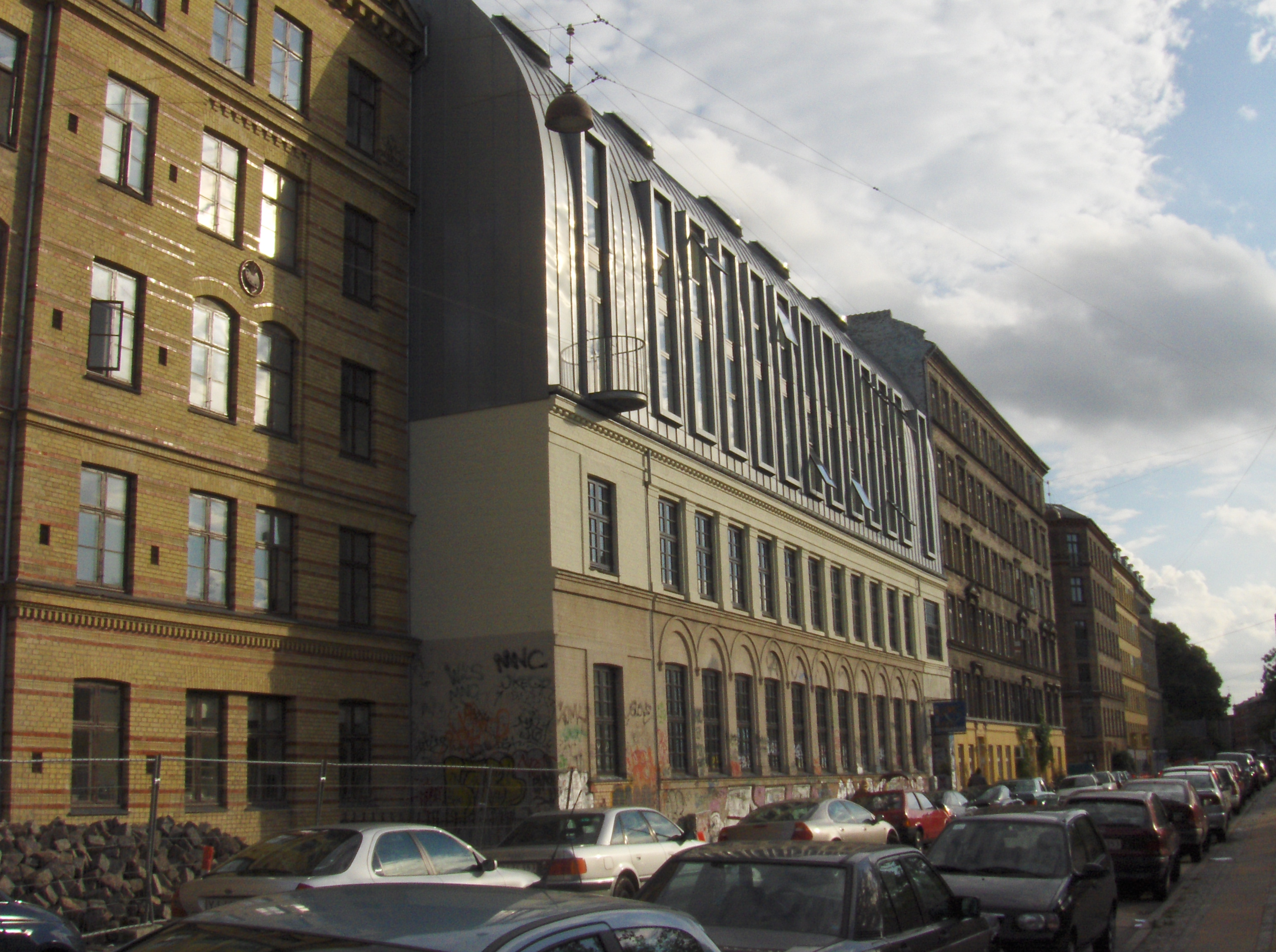
No. 26: Det Frie Gymnasium

Det Frie Gymnasium (No. 26) is an upper secondary school which emphasizes school democracy, alternative teaching methods and creative programmes. The school was founded in 1970 and has been located on Møllegade since 1992.

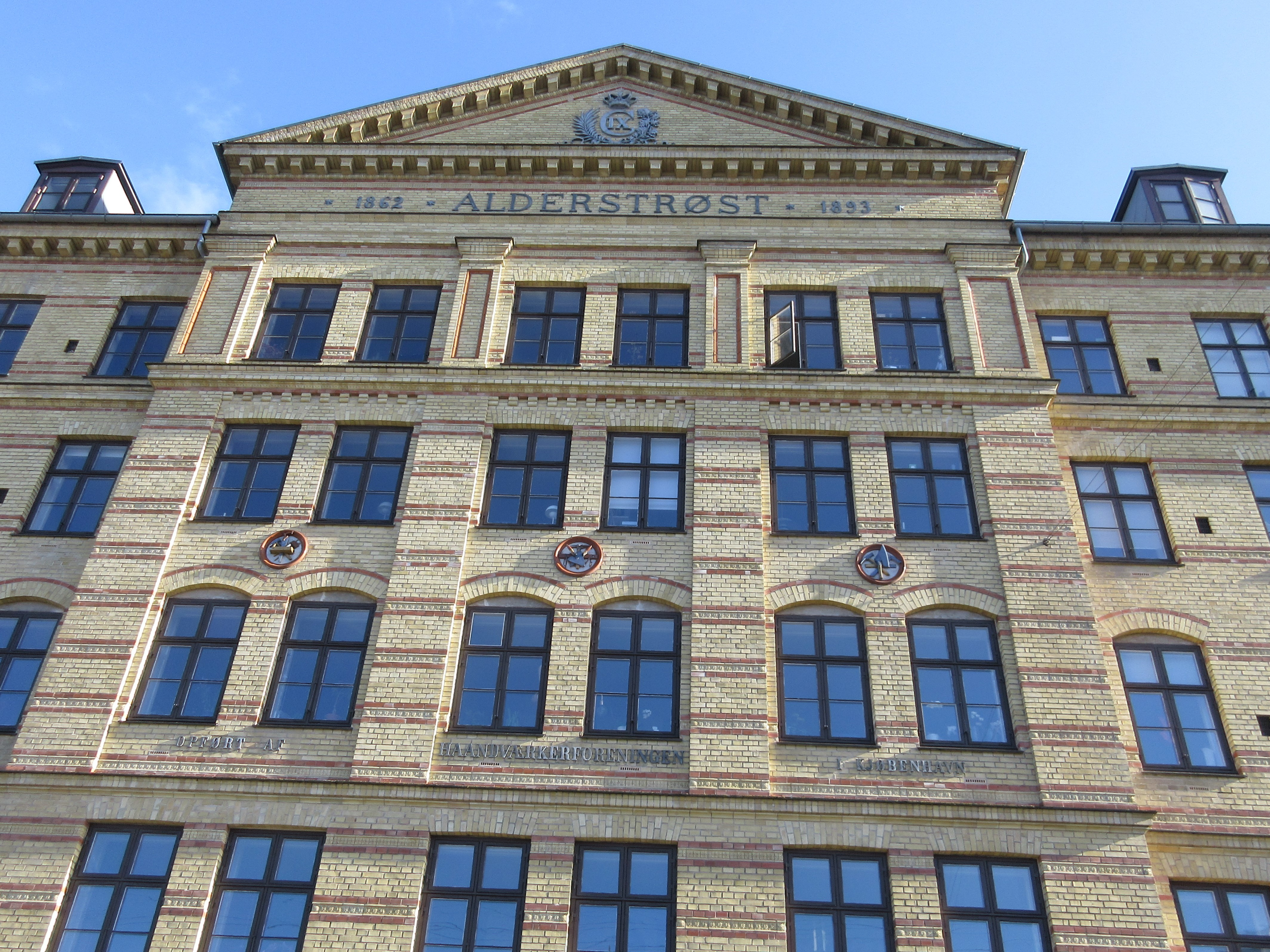
[No. 28–30: Alderstrøst

The Alderstrøst charitable housing complex ([No. 28–30) was built by Håndværkerforeningen and contained affordable housing for old craftsmen. The buildings at No. 15 and No. 19 were completed in 1895 to design by Thorvald Sørensen. The building at No. 17 was built in 1939 by Henning Hansen.

The daycare Møllehuset (No. 33) opened in 2004. The building was designed by OMC Arkitekter.

== Public art ==
Next to LiteraturHaus stands Anders Bundgaard's bronze statue Studying Girl (Danish: Granskende Pige) from 1934. It depicts a girl reading a runestone and a scroll. It was installed at the site in 2008.
