= Association of Craftsmen in Copenhagen =

The Association of Craftsmen in Copenhagen (Danish: Haandværkerforeningen i Kjøbenhavn) is an interest organisation based in Copenhagen, Denmark. Its 2,200 members are owners of small and medium large companies. It is affiliated with 35 guilds and industry organisations.

== History ==
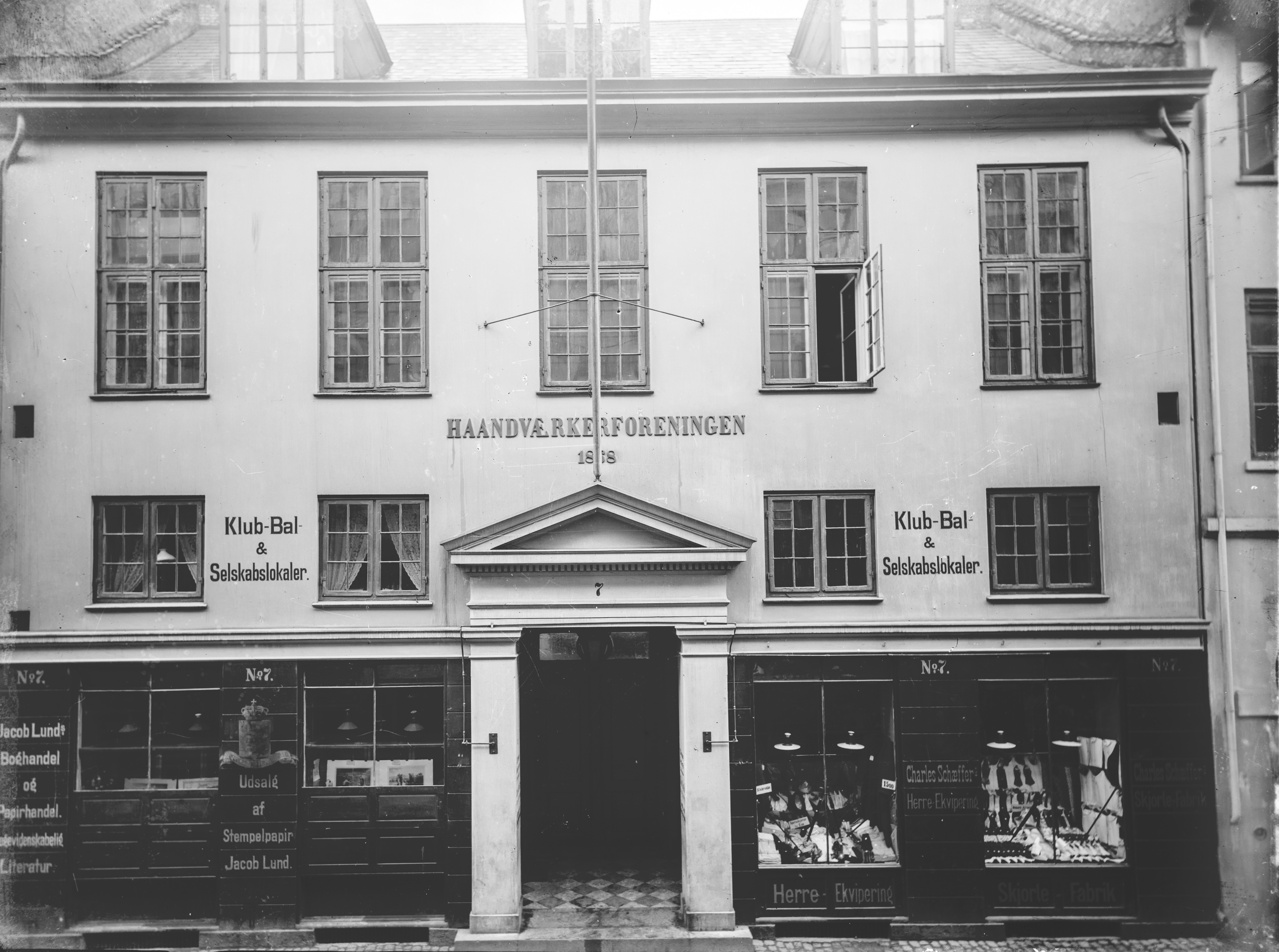
The former headquarters at Kronprinsensgade 7

The association was founded at the initiative of master joiner Lasenius Kramp in 1840 to promote the interest of craftsmen of all trades.

Håndværkerforeningen acquired a former Freemasons' Hall on Kronprinsensgade (No. 7) in 1868. They had a 2000-volume library reading room and billiard room in the building but moved out after taking over Moltke's Mansion on Dronningens Tværgade in 1930.

== Headquarters ==
In 1880, the Craftsmen's Association acquired Moltke's Mansion on the corner of Bredgade and Dronningens Tværgade in Copenhagen. The following year the association expanded the building with a new wing with an assembly hall.

== Residential portfolio ==
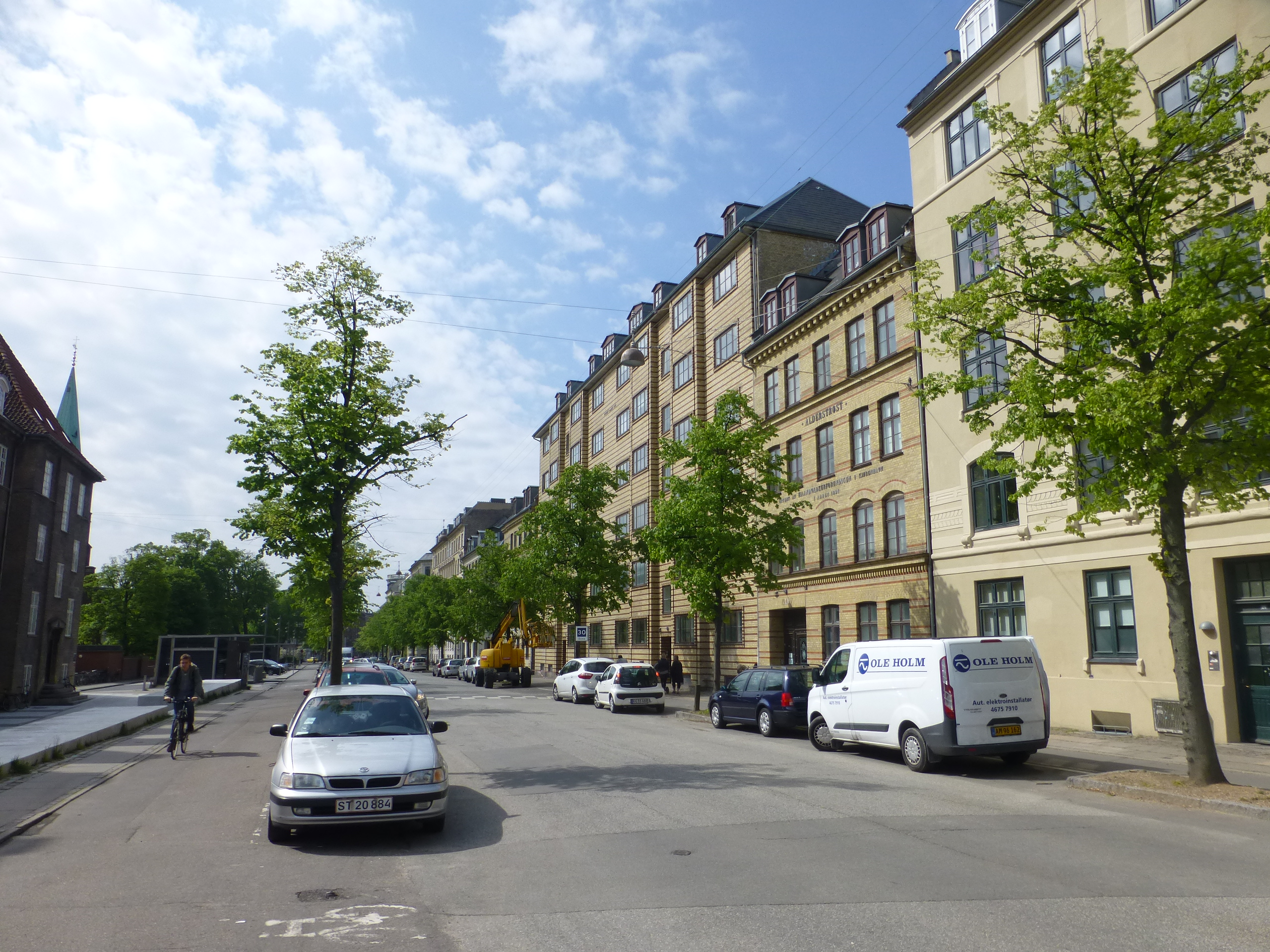
Alderstrøst on Nørre Allé

Håndværkerforenignen owns a large number of residences in the Greater Copenhagen area. Alderstrøst is the name of two residential complexes built by Håndværkerforeningen to provide affordable housing for elderly, indigent members and their widows in the Nørrebro district of Copenhagen. The oldest is located on Nørrebrogade (Nørrebrogade 17, Baggesensgade 10 and Blågårdsgade 9). The other one is located at the corner of Nørre Allé (No. 15–19) and Møllegade (No. 28–30). The Nørreborgade complex is no longer owned by Håndværkerforeningen.

Håndværkerhaven is a residential complex built by Håndværkerforeningen next to Rmdrup station in 1940. It consists of five buildings with a total of 351 mainly cheap one and two-room apartments.

The Bispebjerg Bakke housing estate was built by Håndværkerforeningen in collaboration with Realdania to design by the artist Bjørn Nørgaard with use of old building practices in 2004–06. It is located in the Bispebjerg district of Copenhagen.

Håndværkerforeningen also owns a number of other properties in the Copenhagen area. These include the historic Møllmanns Landsted on Allégade in Frederiksberg. It consists of a Neoclassical house in the courtyard from 1794 and a building on the street from

== Awards ==
=== Medal ===
Copenhagen City Hall plays host to an annual banquet where Håndværkerforeningen's medal in silver or bronze is awarded to the best new craftsmen in Copenhagen. The ceremony has been attended by members of the Danish royal family since 1927.

=== Honorary Craftsman of the Year ===
Since 1973, Håndværkerforeningen has awarded the title Honorary Craftsman of the Year (Danish: Årets Æreshåndværker) to an individual for his or her significant contribution to Danish society. Former Honorary Craftsmen of the Year are:

- 2015: Bertel Haarder, politician
- 2014: Olafur Eliasson, artist
- 2013: Susanne Bier, film director
- 2012: Asger Aamund, businessman
- 2011: Claus Meyer, gastronomic entrepreneur
- 2010: Anders Fogh Rasmussen, politician
- 2009: Hans Edvard Nørregård-Nielsen, art historian
- 2008: Ulrik Wilbek, sport coach
- 2007: Michael Pram Rasmussen, businessman
- 2006: Michael Kvium, artist
- 2005: Kasper Holten, opera director and arts administrator
- 2004: Johannes Møllehave, priest and writer
- 2003: Ghita Nørby, actress
- 2002: Jørgen Mads Clausen, businessman
- 2001: Lene Vestergaard Hau, physicist and professor
- 2000: Benny Andersen, poet and composer
- 1999: Niels-Henning Ørsted Pedersen, jazz musician
- 1998: Bjørn Nørgaard, artist
- 1997: Hanne Reintoft, social worker and politician
- 1996: Michala Petri, musician and professor
- 1995: Niels Due Jensen, businessman
- 1994: Erik Mortensen, fashion designer
- 1993: Bille August, film director
- 1992: Poul Schlüter, politician
- 1991: Mette Koefoed Bjørnsen, economist and conciliator
- 1990: Michael Schønwandt, conductor
- 1989: Søren T. Lyngsø, engineer and businessman
- 1988: Lise Nørgaard, author
- 1987: Frits Helmuth, actor
- 1986: Inge Genefke, læge og menneskerettighedsforkæmper
- 1985: Erik Werner, bladtegner
- 1984: Christian Rovsing, ingeniør og erhvervsleder
- 1983: Godtfred Kirk Christiansen, businessman
- 1982: Mogens Frohn Nielsen, captain and educator
- 1981: Mærsk Mc-Kinney Møller, businessman
- 1980: Margrethe II of Denmark
- 1979: Lis Møller, journalist and politician
- 1978: Per V. Brüel, engineer and businessman
- 1977: Victor Borge, pianist and entertainer
- 1976: Steen Eiler Rasmussen, architect
- 1975: Piet Hein, poet, mathematician

' 1974: Bjørn Wiinblad, ceramist, designer and designer

- 1973: Robert Jacobsen, artist

== Grants and scholarships ==
- Tømrermester Th. P. Stillinges Fond
- Kurvemøbelfabrikant G. Frickenmeier og Hustrus Legat
- Haandværkerforeningens Understøttelsesfond
- Haandværkerforeningens Fond (Alderstrøst)
- Haandværkerforeningens Stiftelse Alderstrøsts Legatfond
- H.C. Heegaard og Hustrus Legat
- Det Massmannske Legat
- Drejermester P.A. Parsfelds Mindelegat
- Snedkermester Rasmus Pedersens Fond
- Ester Oline Nielsens Fond
- Begravelseskassen
- Johan Bekker og Hustrus Stiftelse
