= Almindelig Hospital =

Hospital and poorhouse in Copenhagen, Denmark

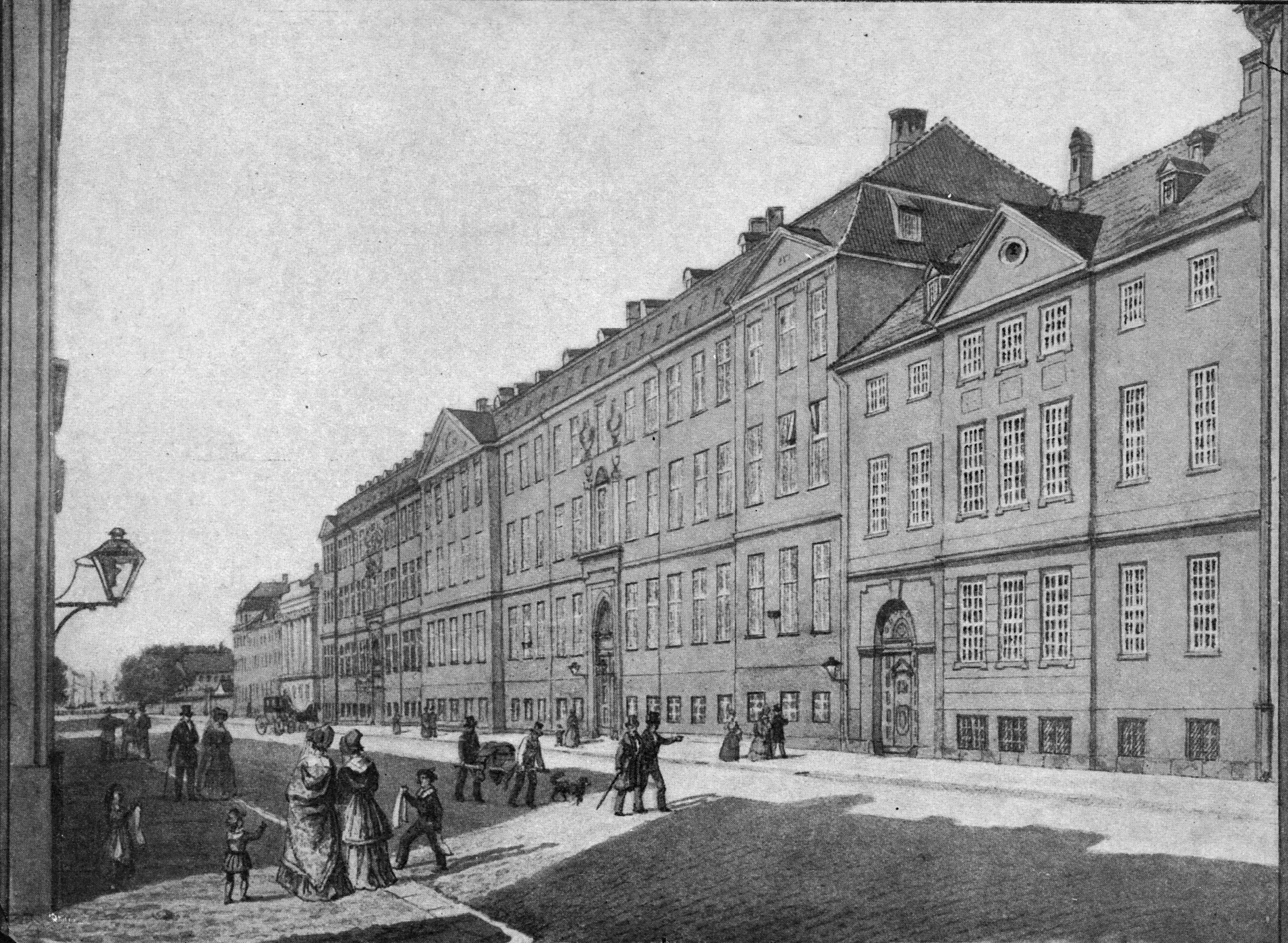
Drawing of Almindelig Hospital by H. G. F. Holm

Almindelig Hospital (English General Hospital) was a combined hospital and poorhouse situated on Amaliegade in Copenhagen, Denmark. In 1892, it relocated to new premises on Nørre Allé (now De Gamles By). From 1941, it was continued as Nørre Hospital (Northern Hospital). Its old building on Amaliegade was demolished in 1895.

== History ==
Almindelig Hospital was established as an institution under Copenhagen's Poor Authority (Københavns Fattigvæsen). It complemented Frederiks Hospital on the other side of Amaliegade. Almindelig Hospital on Amaliegade was inaugurated on 9 April 1769. The building was designed by Nicolas-Henri Jardin and Johan Christian Conradi. It replaced five older townhouses, including the Duntzfeldt Mansion. The institution served as a work house where indigent elderly and sick people who were not able to provide for themselves could get accommodation. In 1770, when Johann Friedrich Struensee effectively ruled the country, it was also put into use as a modern-style hospital.

In 1775, together with Christians Plejehus, Almindelig Hospital was moved to new premises at Sølvgade Barracks. In 1885, it was moved back to its old building on Amaliegade.

During the Battle of Copenhagen in 1801 and the bombardment of Copenhagen in 1807, Almindelig Hospital was used as a lazaret. The number of hospital beds was gradually increased to around 500. Part of the hospital-related activities were discontinued when Copenhagen Municipal Hospital opened in 1863. It was still used for patients with chronic deceases as well as patients with skin and sexually transmitted deceases. In 1885, these patients were transferred to the new Western Hospital on Tietgensgade and Sankt Johannes Stiftelse in Nørrebro.

=== Later locations ===
In 1892, Almindelig Hospital relocated to a new site on Nørre Allé on Nørrebro. In 1933, it was renamed Københavns Almindelige Hospital og Plejestiftelse.

Almindelig Hospital was partly relocated to new buildings on Ryesgade. It was continued as Nørre Hospital (Northern Hospital) and Københavns Plejehjem (Copenhagen Nursing Home). Nørre Hospital closed in 1978. Part of the buildings were demolished and replaced by the senior citizens' home Sølund.

== Gallery ==
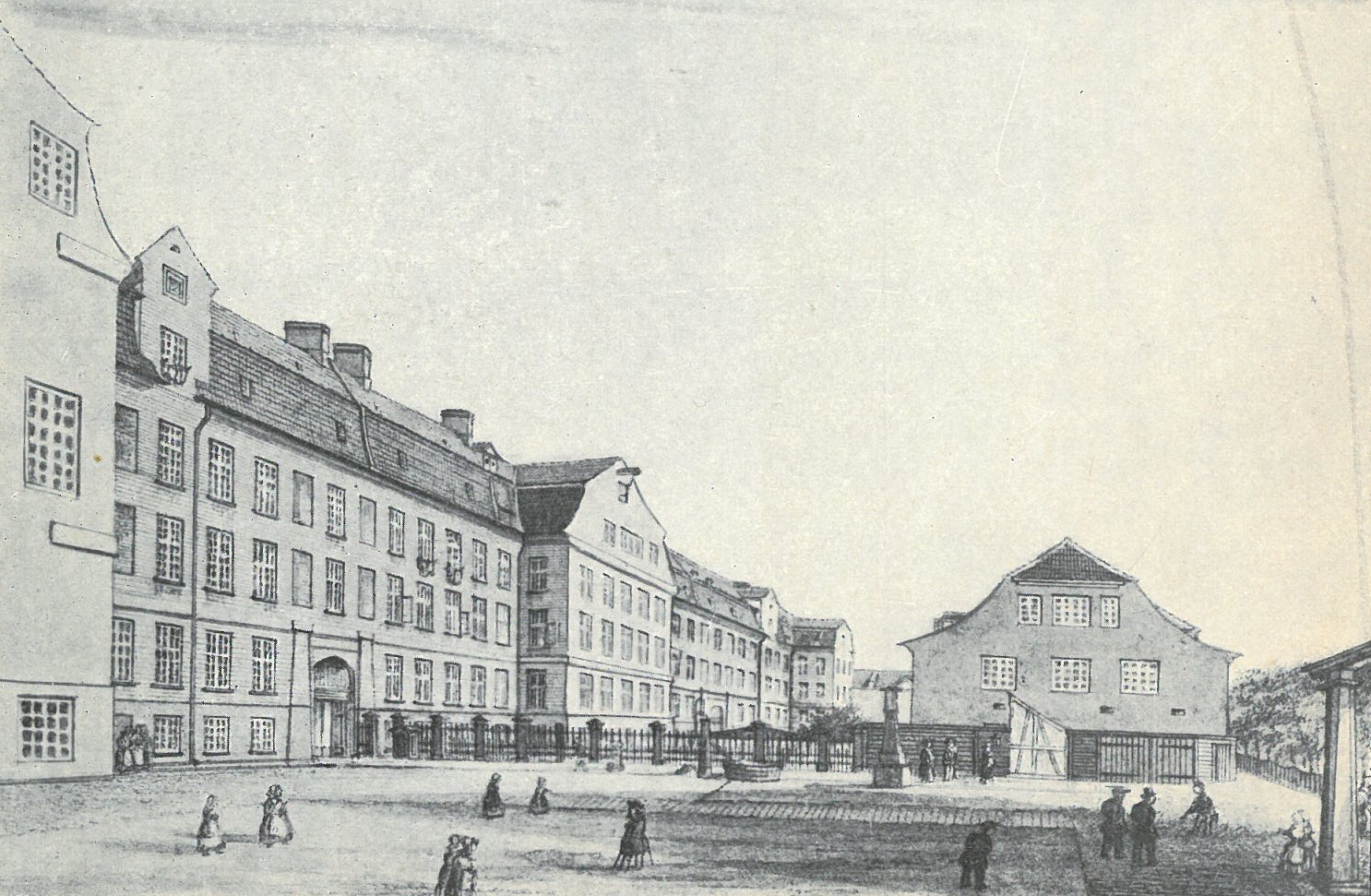
Almindelig Hospital, c. 1819

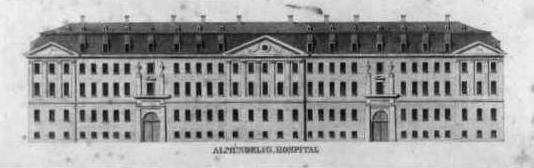
Almindelig Hospital, 1830

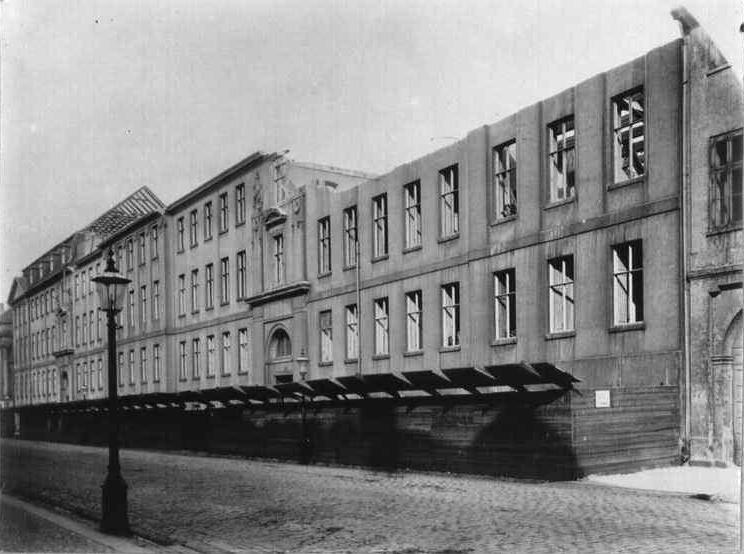
Almindelig Hospital under demolition in 1895
