= Alderstrøst =

Residential buildings in Copenhagen, Denmark

Coordinates: 55°41′34.7″N 12°33′34.3″E

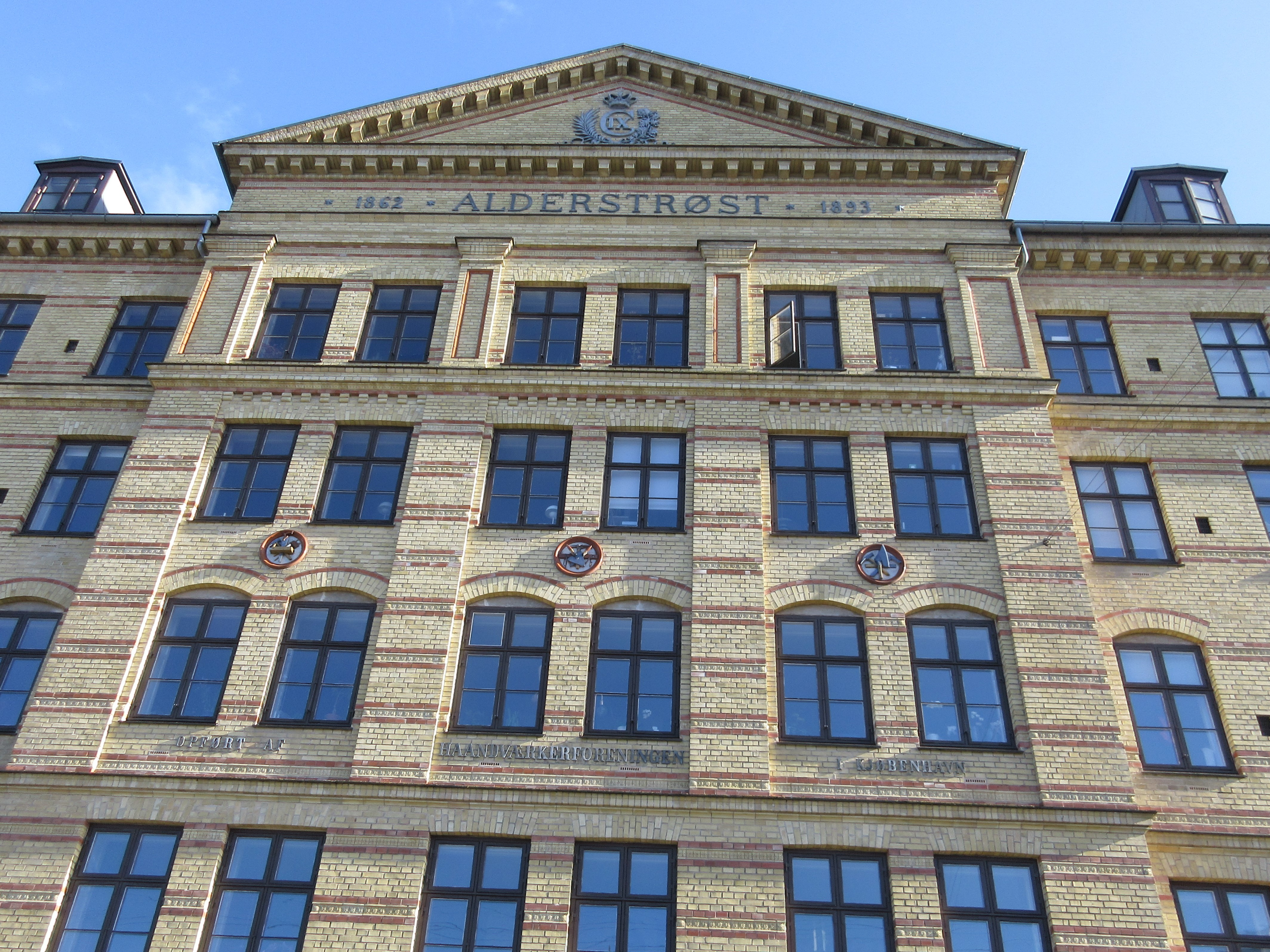
Alderstrøst seen from Møllegade

Alderstrøst refers to two residential complexes built by Association of Craftsmen in Copenhagen to provide affordable housing for elderly, indigent members and their widows in the Nørrebro district of Copenhagen, Denmark. The oldest is located on Nørrebrogade (Nørrebrogade 17, Baggesensgade 10 and Blågårdsgade 9). The other one is located at the corner of Nørre Allé (No. 15–19) and Møllegade (No. 28–30). The Nørreborgade complex is no longer owned by Håndværkerforeningen.

== History ==
=== Creating the foundation ===
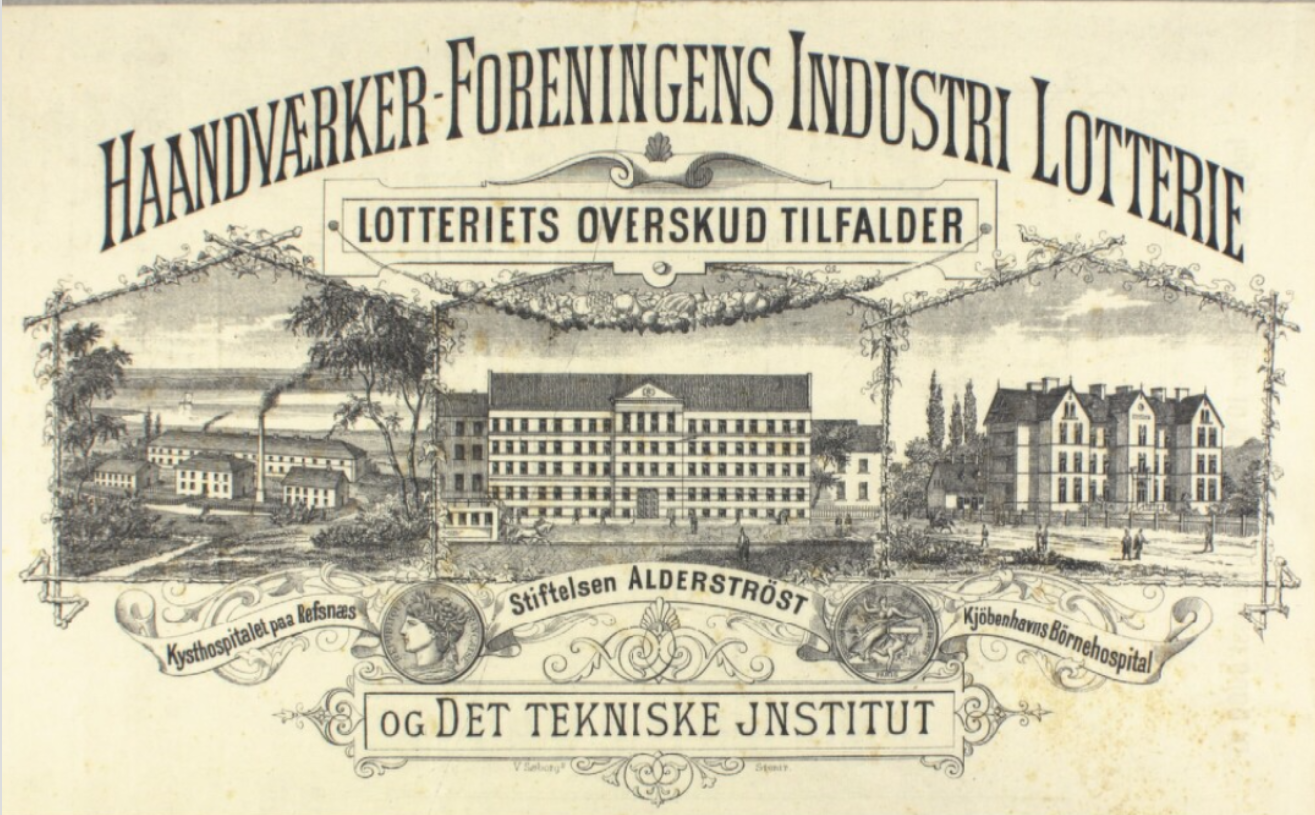
Lottery ticket from Håndværkerforeningen used as part of the financing of the Alderstrøst project

On a board meeting in 1852, the idea was conceived for a "collection lottery" which was to raise funds for the construction of affordable housing for elderly craftsmen in Copenhagen but the lottery was not approved by the authorities until 1857. The Alderstrøst Foundation was established in 1862. Other contributions came from gifts and grants.

=== Alderstrøst in Nørrebrogade ===
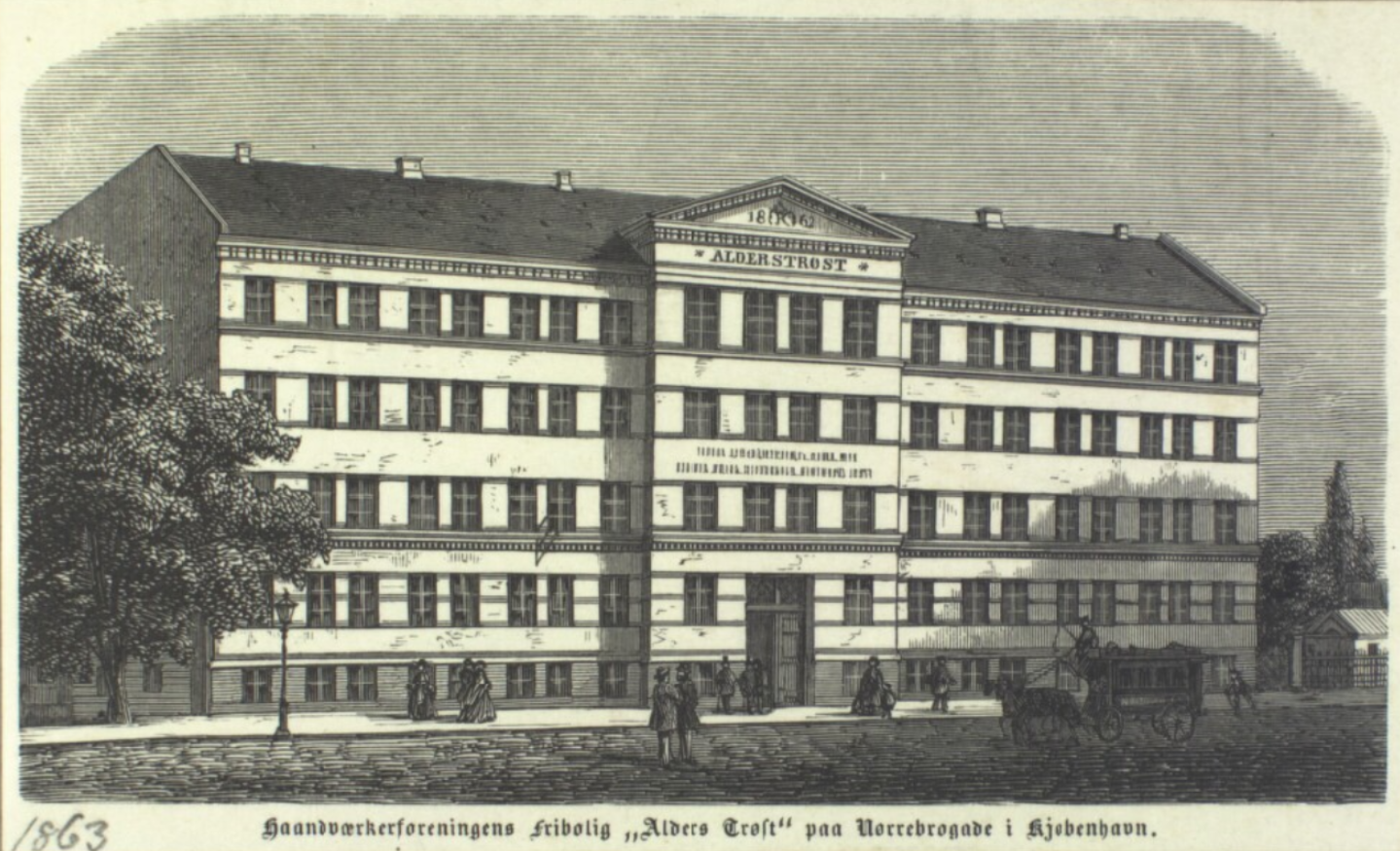
Alderstrøst on Nørrebrogade

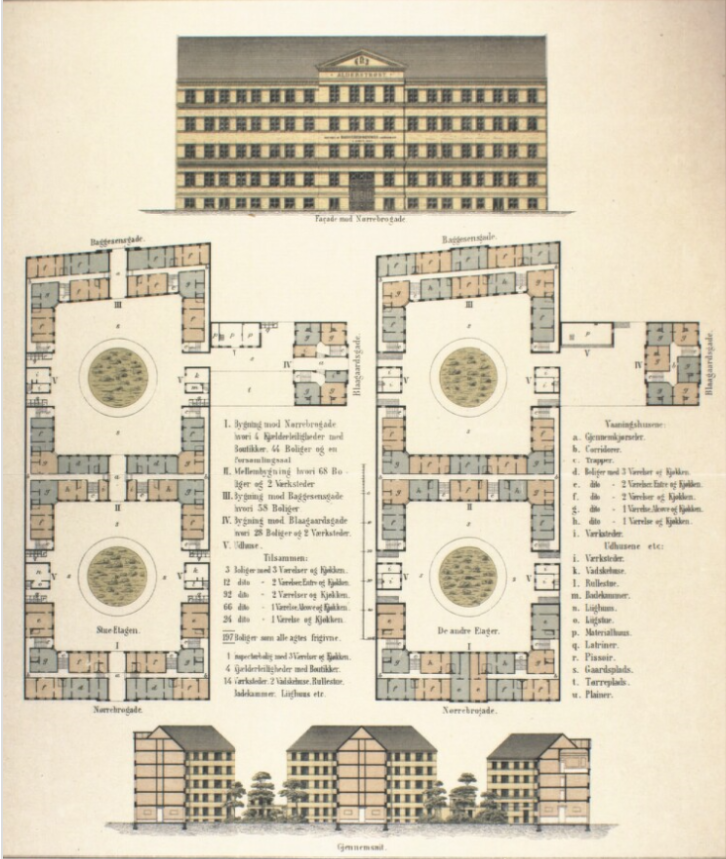
Rendering of Alderstrøst on Nørrebrogade

An 11,606 square alen (4,180 m^{2}) site on Nørrebrogade was acquired the architect Theodor Sørensen, who had recently completed St. John's Church, Nørrebro's first church, was charged with the design of the first residences. The building was completed in 1863. It was expanded with a new wing on Baggesengade and a connecting building in 1870–71. The complex was expanded again in 1870 when a new wing was built on Blågårdsgade. All the buildings are in four or five storeys and the complex originally contained 194 homes.

=== Alderstrøst in Nørre Allé ===
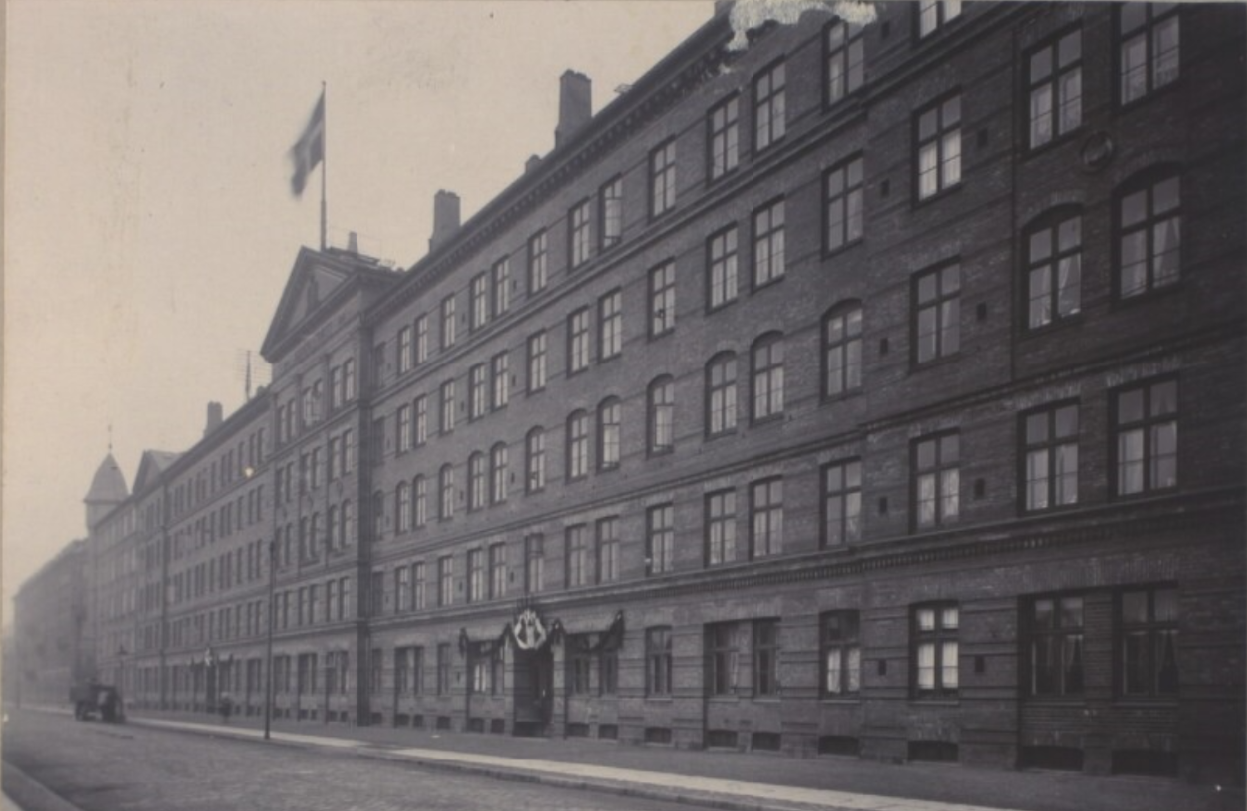
Alderstrøst on Møllegade

A new, 15,848 square alen (5,708 m^{2}) site was acquired on the corner of Møllegade and Nørre Allé in 1892. The side on Nørre Allé flanked Bræstrups Stiftelse, another charitable housing complex. The new building was designed by Thorvald Sørensen, Theodor Sørensen's son. The foundation stone for the new building was set on 16 January 1893 and it was completed in 1895. The complex consisted of a main wing on Møllegade, both of which in five storeys, and twofour-storey buildings on Nørre Allé. At the time of its inauguration, the complex contained 35 free residences and 226 residences with low rent. Im 1937-38, Håndforeningen purchased Bræstrups Stiftelse at Nørre Allé 17. The building was demolished and replaced by a new building designed by Henning Hansen. It is designed in a restrained, functionalist style with horizontal lines in the brickwork and with use of building materials similar to those of the older buildings.

=== Later initiative ===
In 1936, Haandværkerforeningen launched an architectural competition for a third Alderstrøst in Emdrup. The competition was won by Henning Hansen but the complex was instead given the name Håndværkerhaven (The Craftsman Garden).

== Today ==
The complex is no longer owned by Håndværkerforeningen but is now a section of FSBbolig.

The complex on Nørre Allé was refurbished for DKK 22+ millions between 2003 and 2008 by AI-gruppen A/S and MT Højgaard. The complex now contains 156 apartments.
