= Sankt Hans Torv =

Public square in the Nørrebro district of Copenhagen, Denmark

Coordinates: 55.6908°N 12.5606°E

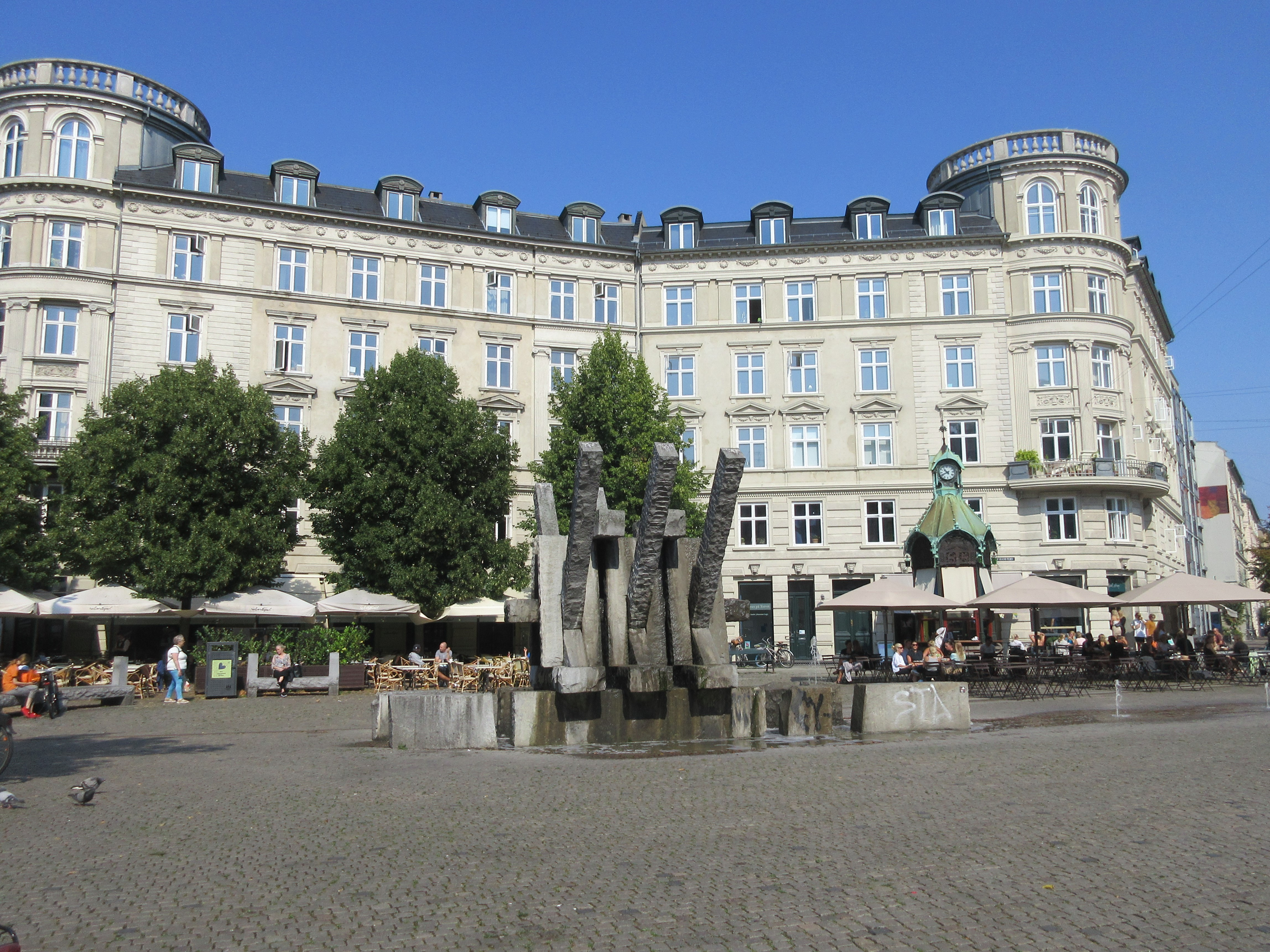
Sankt Hans Torv in August 2022.

Sankt Hans Torv (lit. 'St. John's Marketplace') is a public square in the heart of the Nørrebro district of Copenhagen, Denmark. It is dominated by a large granite sculpture by Jørgen Haugen Sørensen and is known for its thriving café scene. St. John's Church, the largest and oldest church in Nørrebro, is situated just east of the square.

Located close to the major shopping street Nørrebrogade and The Lakes, the square is a major junction in the area where the streets Blegdamsvej, Nørre Allé, Guldbergsgade, Elmegade, Fælledvej and Sankt Hans Gade meet.

== History ==
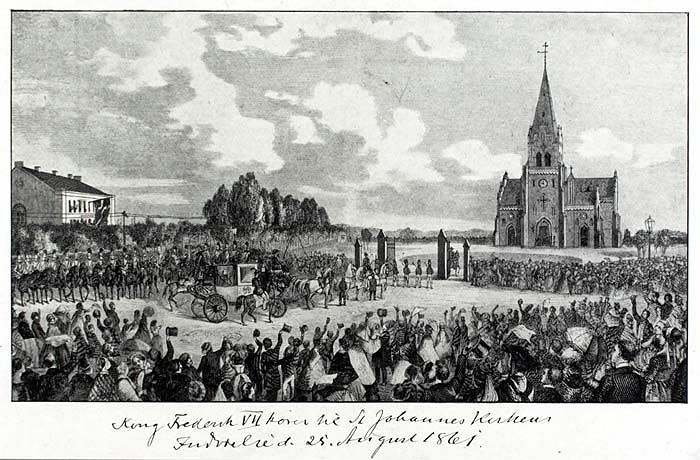
King Frederik VII's arrival for the consecration ceremony of St. John's Church in 1862

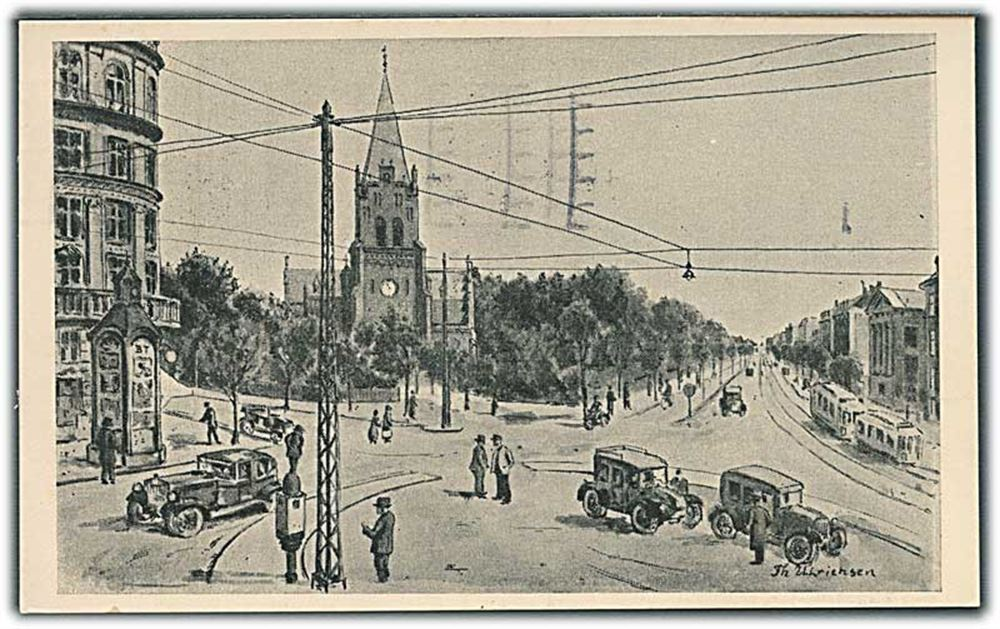
The square on an old postcard

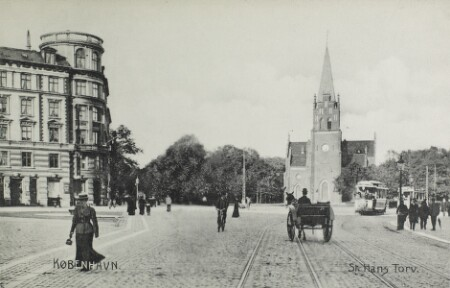
The square in the 1890s

The site used to be part of Blegedam Common, one of the commons which used to surround Copenhagen when it was a fortified city. The square is located at the site where the cows that grazed the Blegdam Common as well as the adjacent Northn and Eastern Commons gathered for milking.

Its status as an important junction goes back a long time. Blegdamsvej is one of the oldest roads in the area and Nørre Allé was established in the middle of the 19th century. Nørrebro's first church, St. John's, was built at the site in 1862 after the so-called Demarcation Line which restricted building activity outside Copenhagen's fortifications was moved to The Lakes. The site was for a while used as a cattle market. The square emerged towards the end of the century when the area was built over and developed into a dense, working-class neighbourhood. As traffic increased, it was reduced to a large road junction.

== Sankt Hans Torv today ==
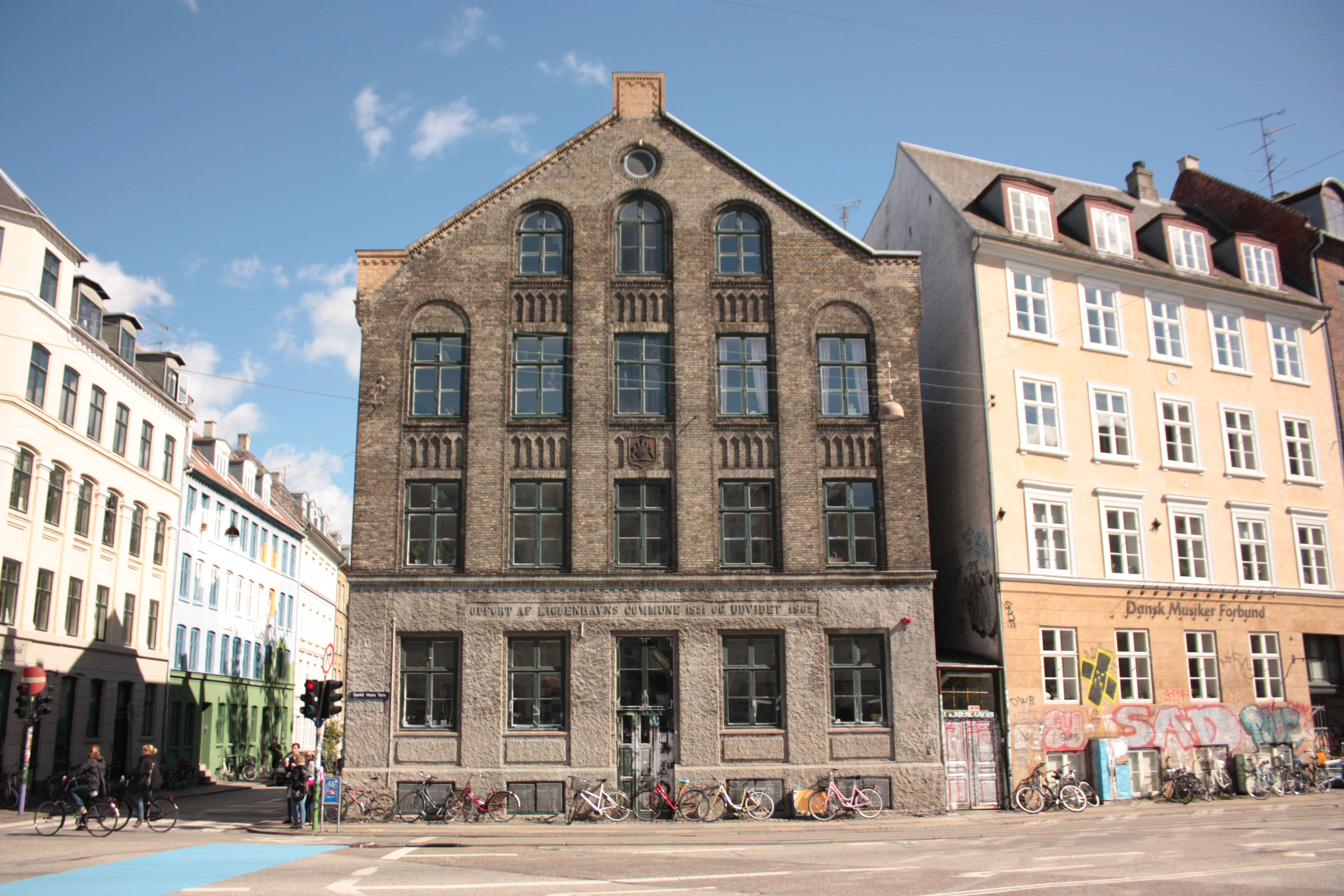
No. 30: The oldest building on the square, dating from 1851 but expanded in 1861

The current square was established in 1993 as part of an urban renewal programme which sought to prompt the ongoing gentrification of the area. It was designed by Sven-Ingvar Andersson and Henrik Pøhlsgaard for City Architect Otto Käszner and completed in 1993. The project concentrated traffic along three sides and created a slightly undulating public space with granite paving.

The square is lined with cafés. French-style Cafe Sebastopol (No. 32) has been located on the square since 1994. Kaffeplantagen, a local chain of coffee houses, opened its first branch at No. 3 in 2004.

== Notable buildings and residents ==
The square is dominated by a large property with a concave facade flanked by two projecting, rounded corners, which occupies the space between Nørre Allé and Guldbergsgade.

The oldest building on the square is the Sankt Hans Gade School. It was built in 1851 yp frdohm nu Peter Christoph Hagemann and was later adapted by Theodor Sørensen in 1862 as witnessed by an inscription on the facade. The school closed in 1984.

== Panorama ==
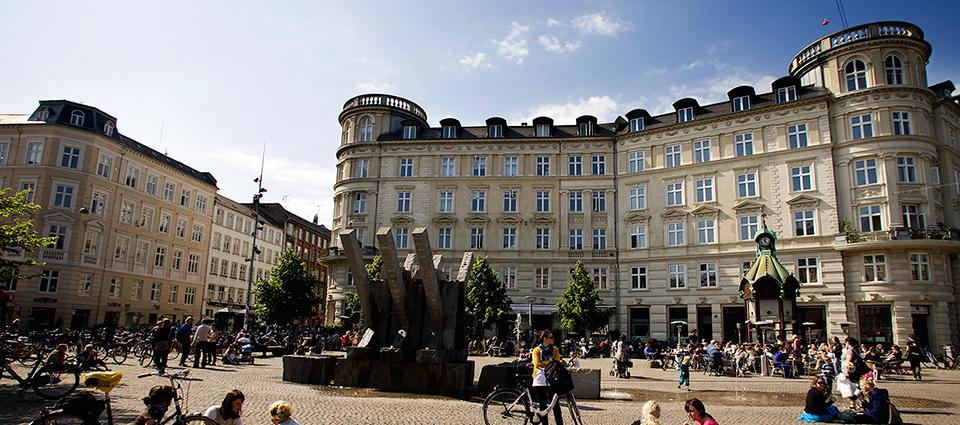
The Bernstorff Palace Gardens

== See also ==
- Blågårds Plads
- De Gamles By
- Blegdamsvej
