= Robert Jacobsen =

Danish artist (1912–1993)

- Born: Robert Julius Tommy Jacobsen; 4 June 1912; Copenhagen, Denmark
- Died: 26 January 1993 (aged 80); Tågelund, Denmark
- Resting place: Vestre Kirkegård in Copenhagen
- Occupations: Sculptor and painter
- Awards: Thorvaldsen Medal (1967); Prince Eugen Medal (1974); Order of the Dannebrog (1983)

Robert Julius Tommy Jacobsen (4 June 1912 – 26 January 1993) was a Danish sculptor and painter. The Danish Robert Award is named in his honor.

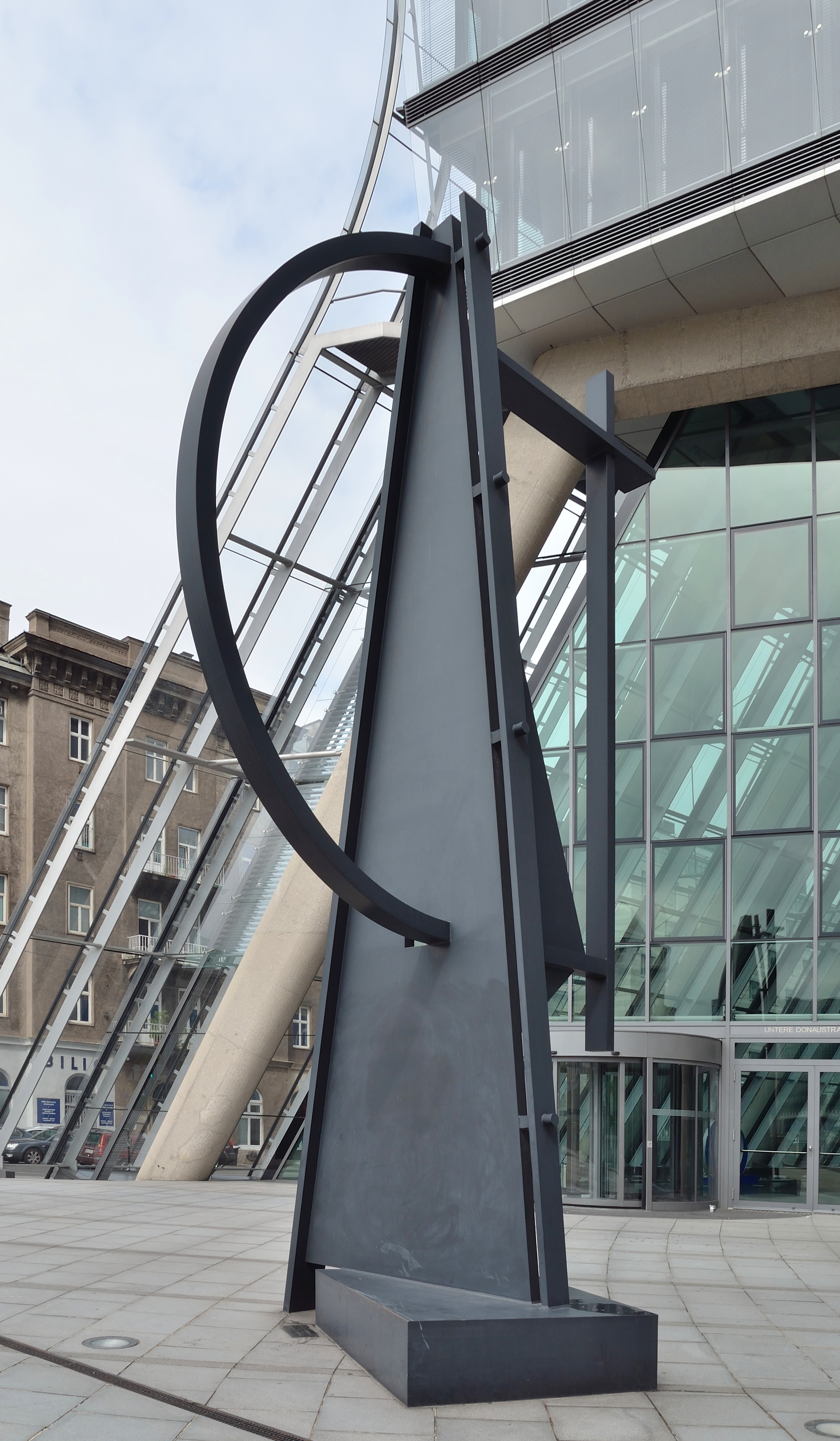
Komposition in Eisen (composition in iron) located in front of the UNIQA building at Leopoldstadt, Vienna

== Biography ==
In this period he created massive granite and sandstone structures which he called "Mythical Creatures" (Danish: Fabeldyr ). In the late 1940s, he creates a group of sculptures which he called "Dolls" (Danish: Dukkerne).

He traveled to France with his colleague Richard Mortensen and lived there from 1947–69. During his time in France he began creating sculptures in cast iron. In France he received the nickname "Gros Robert" (Danish:Store Robert).

== Awards ==
Jacobsen was awarded the Thorvaldsen Medal in 1967. He was made an honorary member of the Association of Craftsmen in Copenhagen in 1973. In 1974 he was awarded the Prince Eugen Medal by the King of Sweden. He became a Commander of the Order of the Dannebrog in 1983.

The Robert Awards (Danish: Robert Prisen) have been awarded annually since 1984 by the Danish Film Academy. The awards are named after Robert Jacobsen who was the statuette's designer.

Since 1993, the Robert Jacobsen Prize of the Würth Foundation has been awarded to contemporary visual artists to commemorate the artist. The prize is endowed with EUR 50,000.
