= Vibenshus Runddel =

Major junction in Copenhagen, Denmark

Coordinates: 55.7064°N 12.5630°E

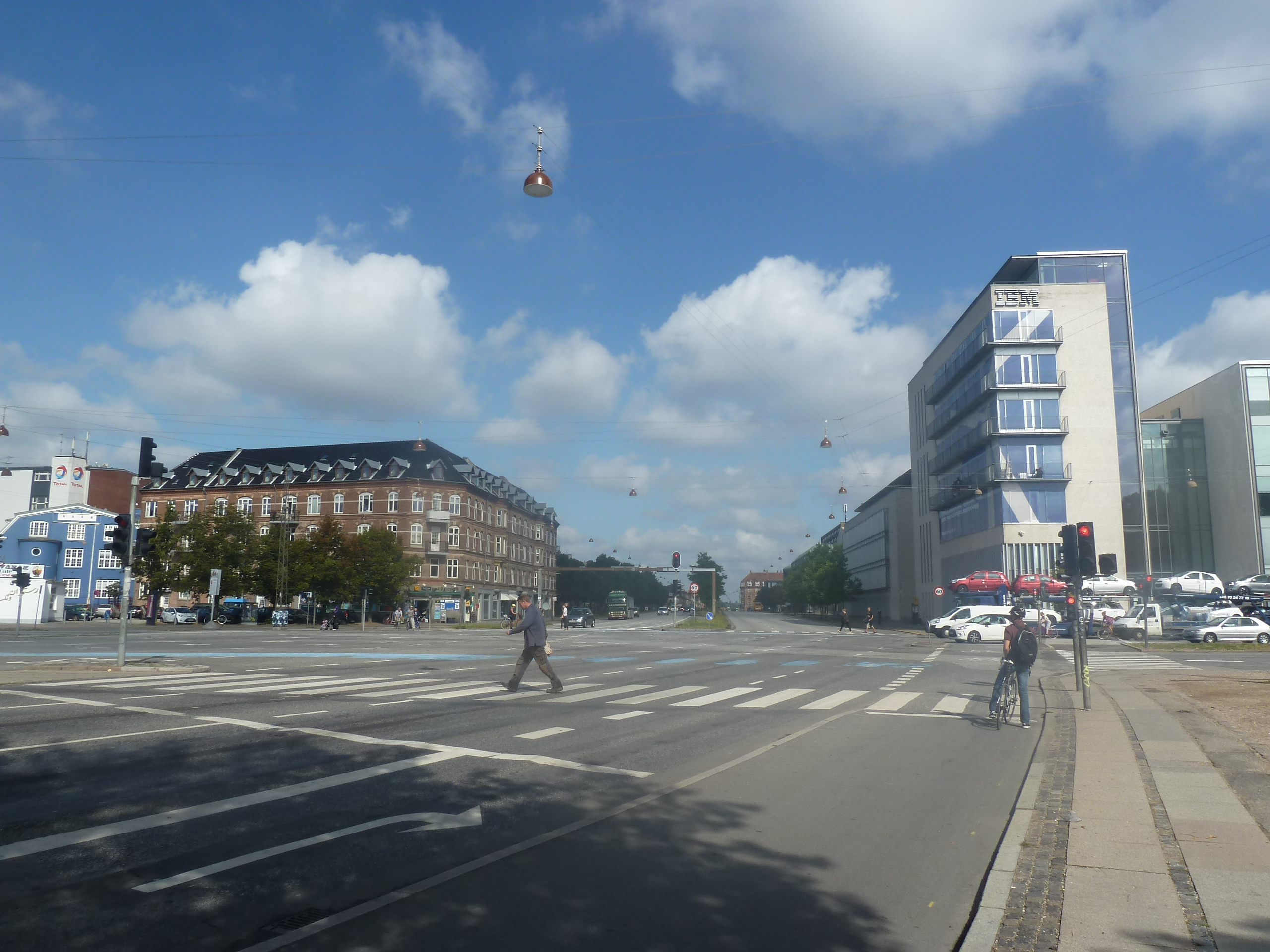
Vibenshus Runddel

Vibenshus Runddel (literally "Vibenshus Circle) is a major junction and public spare where the streets Jagtvej, Nørre Allé, Øster Allé and Lyngbyvejen meet at the northwestern corner of Fælledparken in the outer Østerbro area of Copenhagen, Denmark. In Danish, 'Runddel' means a "round open space at a street junction" One of the 17 stations at the operating City Circle Line of the Copenhagen Metro is located at the site.

== History ==
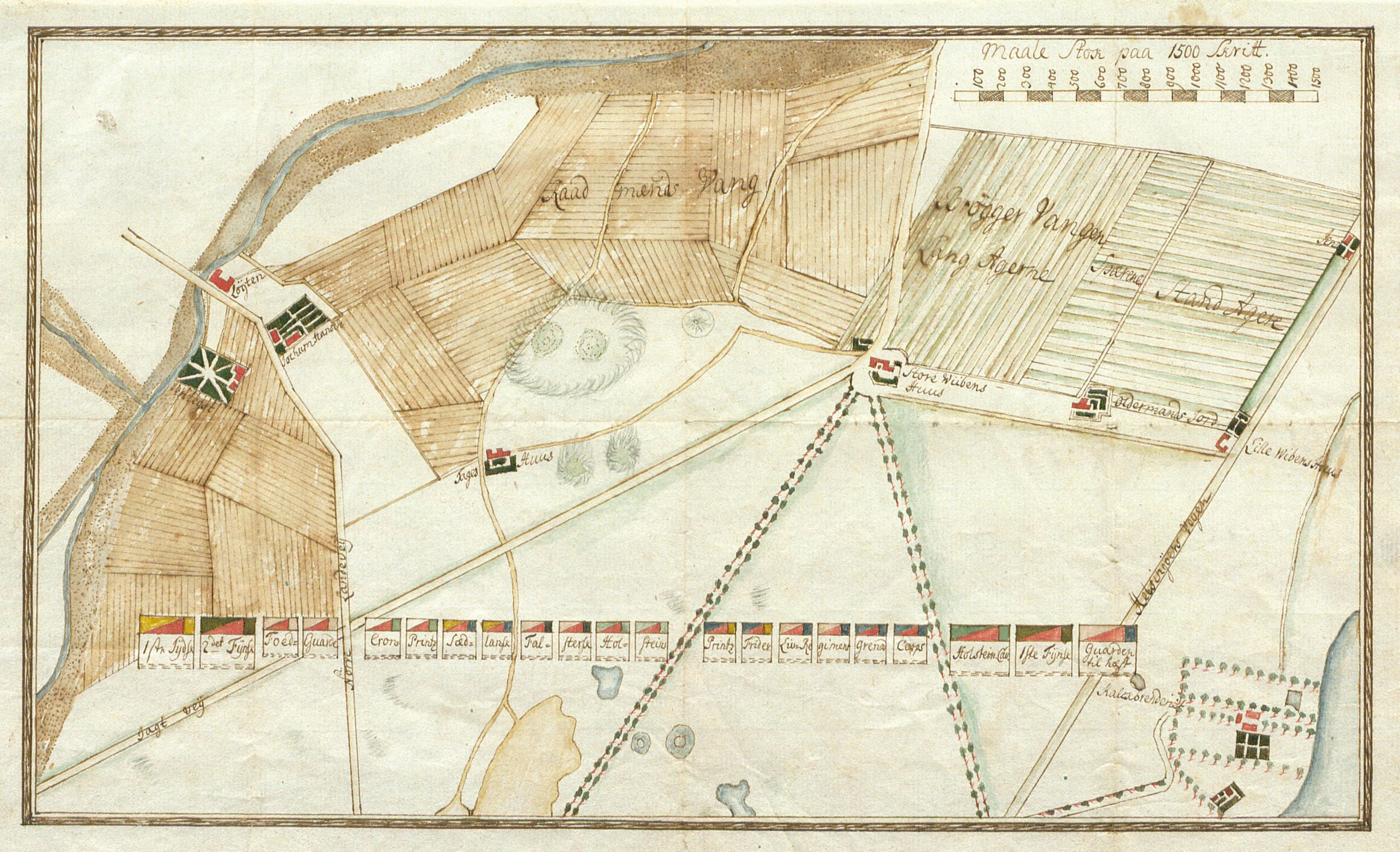
Map of the area from the 1760s.

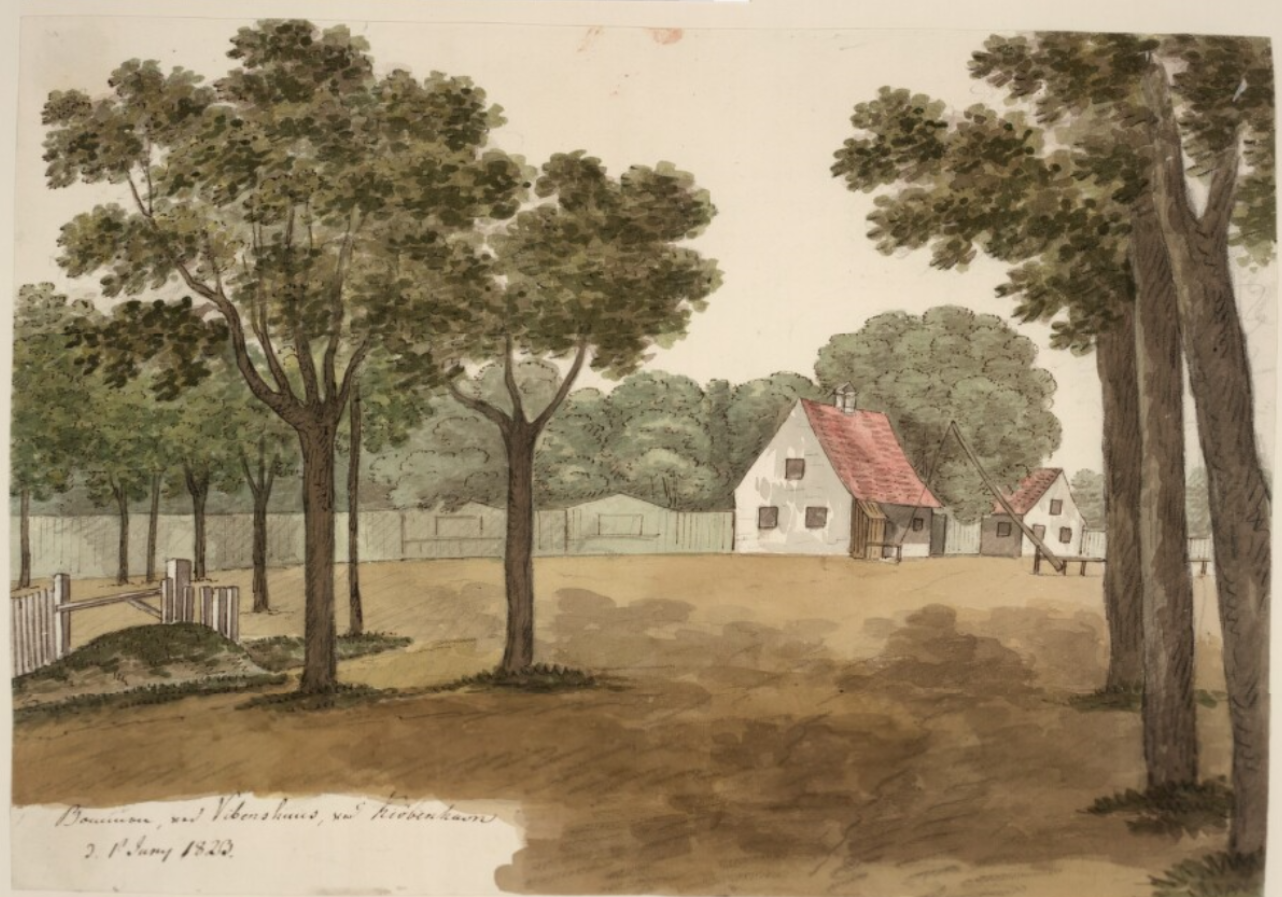
The boom at Vibenhus, near Copenhagen, on 1 June 1823

The name Vibenshus refers to the inn Store Vibenshus ("Great Vibenshus") which was originally built at the site as a residence for the gate keeper at the royal road to Frederiksborg in 1629. The name Vibenhus is first recorded in 1669. The circle that gave rise to the second half of the name was built at the site in the 1770s.

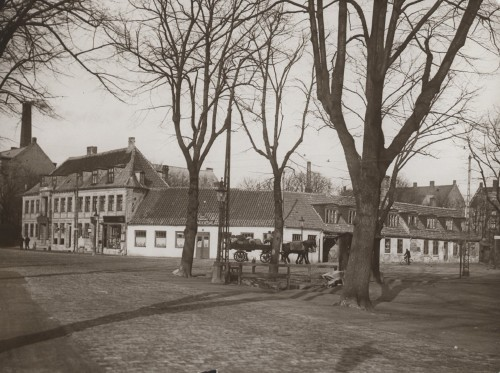
Store Vibenshus, corner of Jagtvej and Lyngbyvej, 1910

The Store Vibenshus building was destroyed by fire and pulled down in 1925. The chocolate manufacturer Galle & Jessen opened I factory at the site in 1884. It was later expanded several times. An architectural competition for a new building at their site was held in 1918. It was won by Kay Fisker but his winning proposal was never realized. A neon advertisement with jumping chocolate frogs was installed on the factory's chimney in 1965. It was for many years a well-known landmark but was dismantled in 2009. The circle disappeared in connection with a road extension in the 1970s.

== Notable buildings and residents ==
A new building for Mærck Data was completed at the Galla & Jessen corner in 2000. It was designed by Anna Maria Indrio from C. F. Møller Architects.

Fælledklubhuset, situated at the Fælledparken corner of the junction, is a club house for football clubs that use the football pitches in the park. It was completed in 2011 and is designed by Vilhelm Lauritzen Arkitekter.
