= St. John's Church, Copenhagen =

St. John's Church
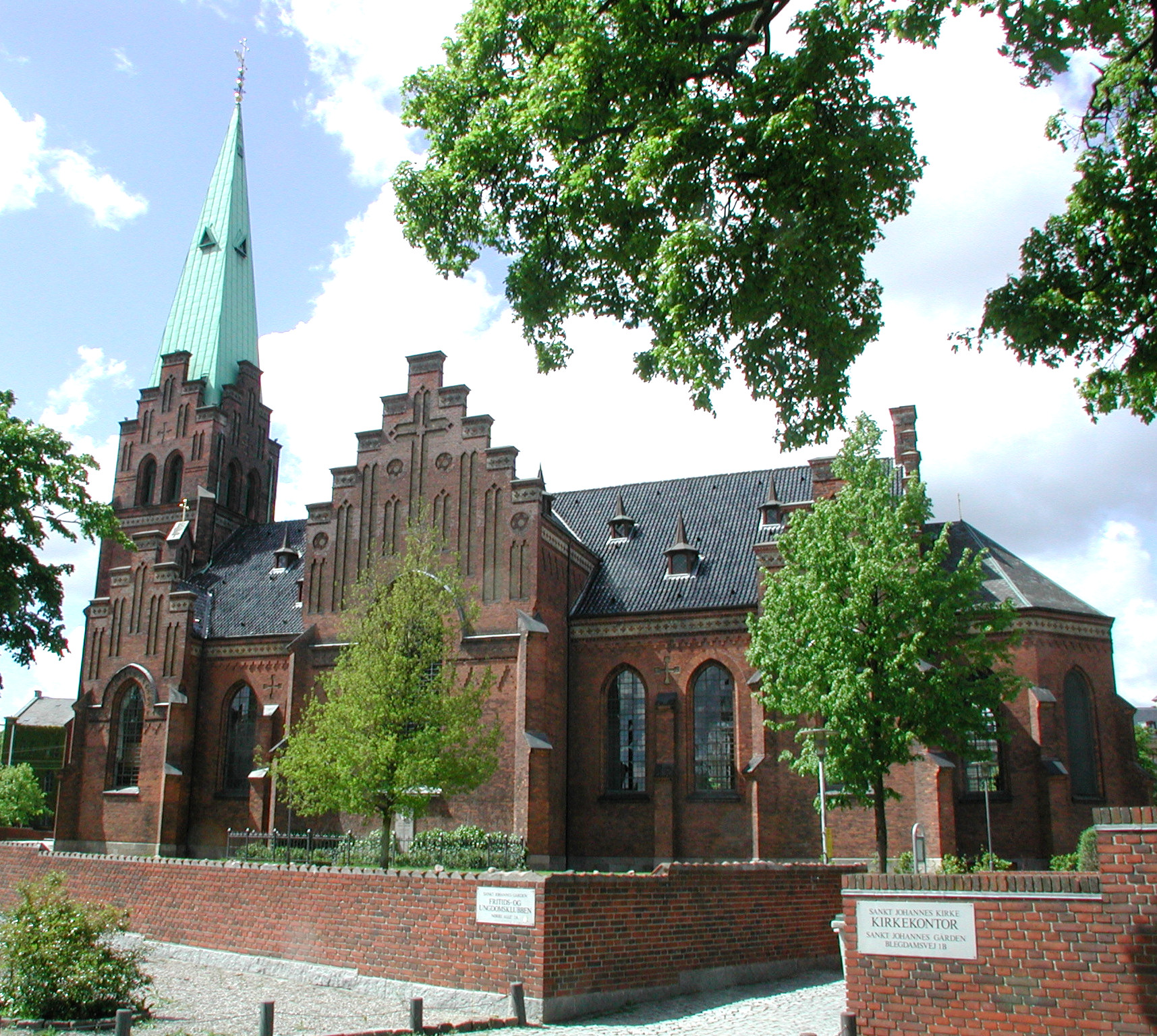
- St. John's Church
- St. John's Church
- 55°41′31″N 12°33′43″E
- Location: Nørrebro, Copenhagen
- Country: Denmark
- Denomination: Church of Denmark

History
- Status: Church

Architecture
- Architect: Theodor Sørensen
- Architectural type: Church
- Style: Gothic Revival
- Groundbreaking: 1856
- Completed: 1861

Specifications
- Height: 54 m
- Materials: Brick

Administration
- Diocese: Diocese of Copenhagen

St. John's Church (Danish: St. Johannes Kirke) is a church located next to Sankt Hans Torv in the heart of the Nørrebro district of Copenhagen, Denmark. Opened in 1861, it was the first church to be built outside the city's old fortification ring when it was decommissioned and new residential neighbourhoods sprung up outside the former city gates.

== History ==
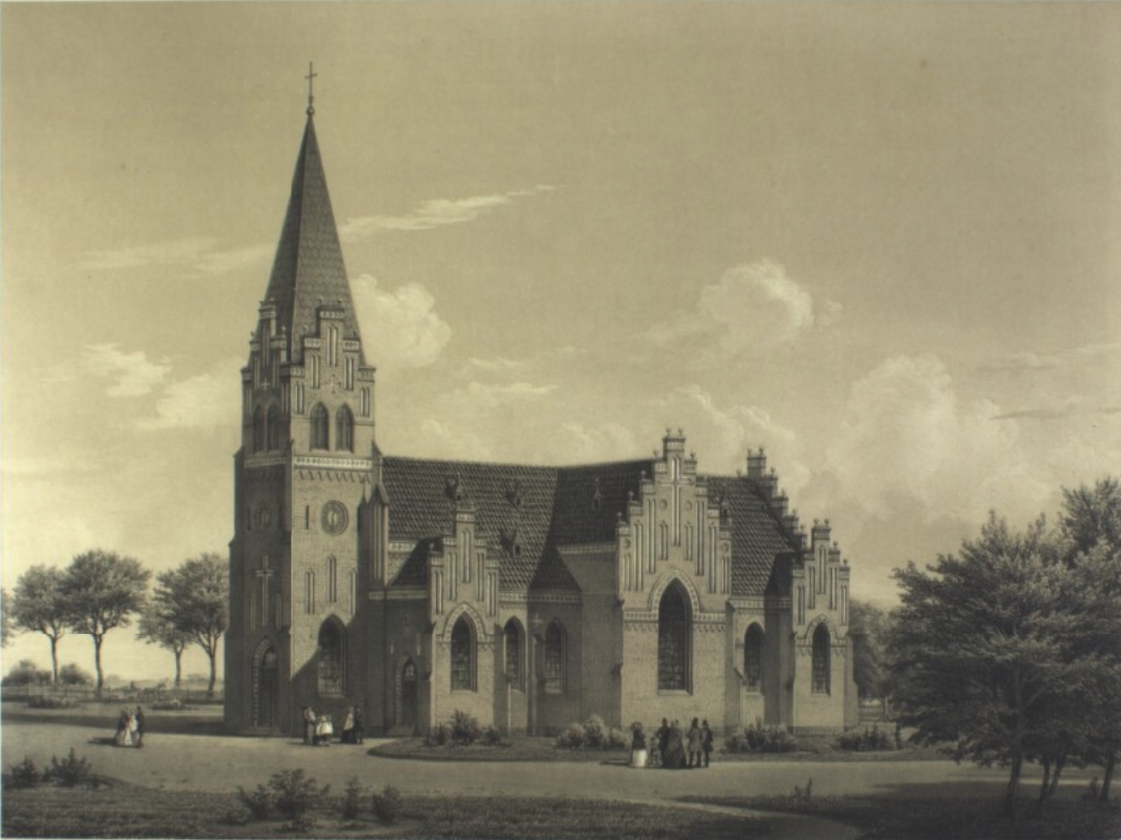
A visualization of the planned St. John's Church by Theodor Sørensen in 856

The decommissioning of Copenhagen's Bastioned Fortifications was a gradual and prolonged process. They had long been under pressure from the fast-growing city and the British bombadement in 1807 during the Battle of Copenhagen showed they had become outdated. By 1850 a decision had still not formally been taken but in 1852 the Demarcation Line, which heavily restricted the access to build within a certain zone outside the fortifications, was confined to the area inside the Lakes, and in 1855 the new times were further anticipated with the demolition of the Northern City Gate.

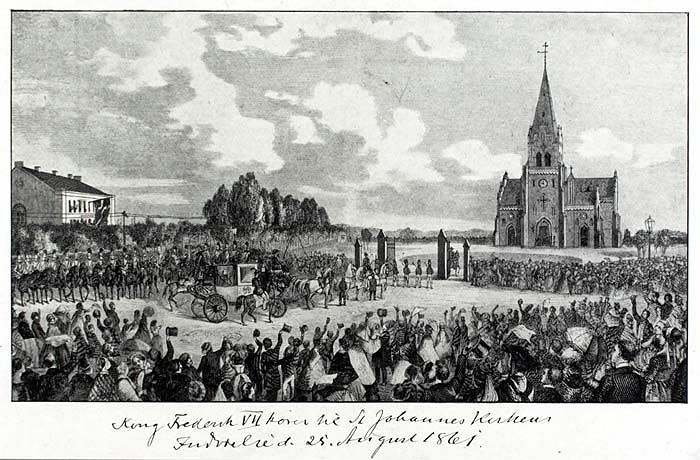
King Frederik VII's arrival for the consecration ceremony

In 1861 construction of St. John's Church began on land provided by the city on the old Blegdam Common. The architect was Theodor Sørensen (architect) who had recently graduated from the Royal Danish Academy of Fine Arts.

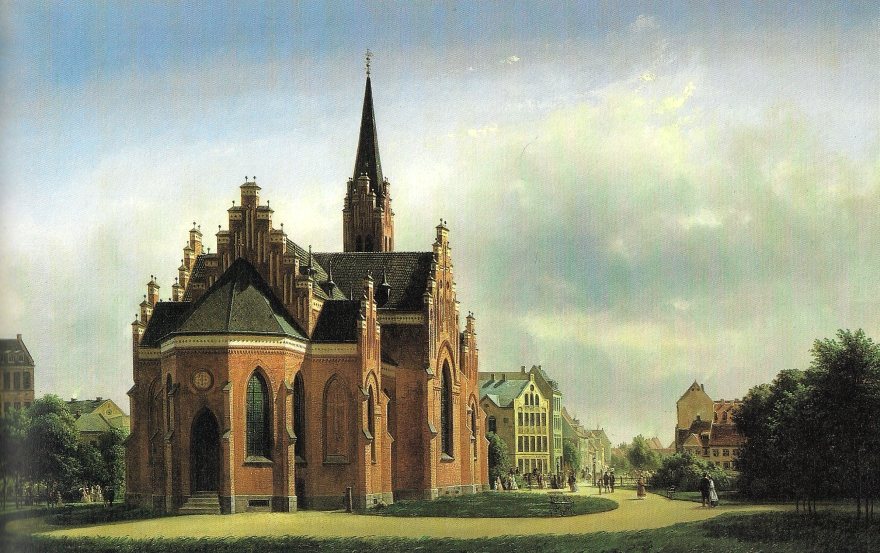
St. John's Church painted by Ferdinand Richardt in 1869

The new church was consecrated on 25 August 1861 at a ceremony attended by King Frederik VII. Incidental music in the form of a cantata with text by Bernhard Severin Ingemann and music by Emil Hartmann was performed at the event.

The new St. John's Parish, which was disjoined from Trinitatis and Our Lady's Parishes, covered an extensive area which included all of Nørrebro and Østerbro and reached all the way to Hellerup and Brønshøj. However, still sparsely populated, it only had about 16,000 inhabitants. The church's first pastor, Rudolf Frimodt, launched a campaign for more churches in the new districts of Copenhagen which, over the course of seven years, from 1874 to 1880, led to four new churches: St. Stephen's, St. James's, St. Paul's and St. Mathew's. By 1885, even with St. Stephen's and St. James's Parishes in the meantime disjoined, the population of St. John's Parish had grown to 60,000.

== Architecture ==
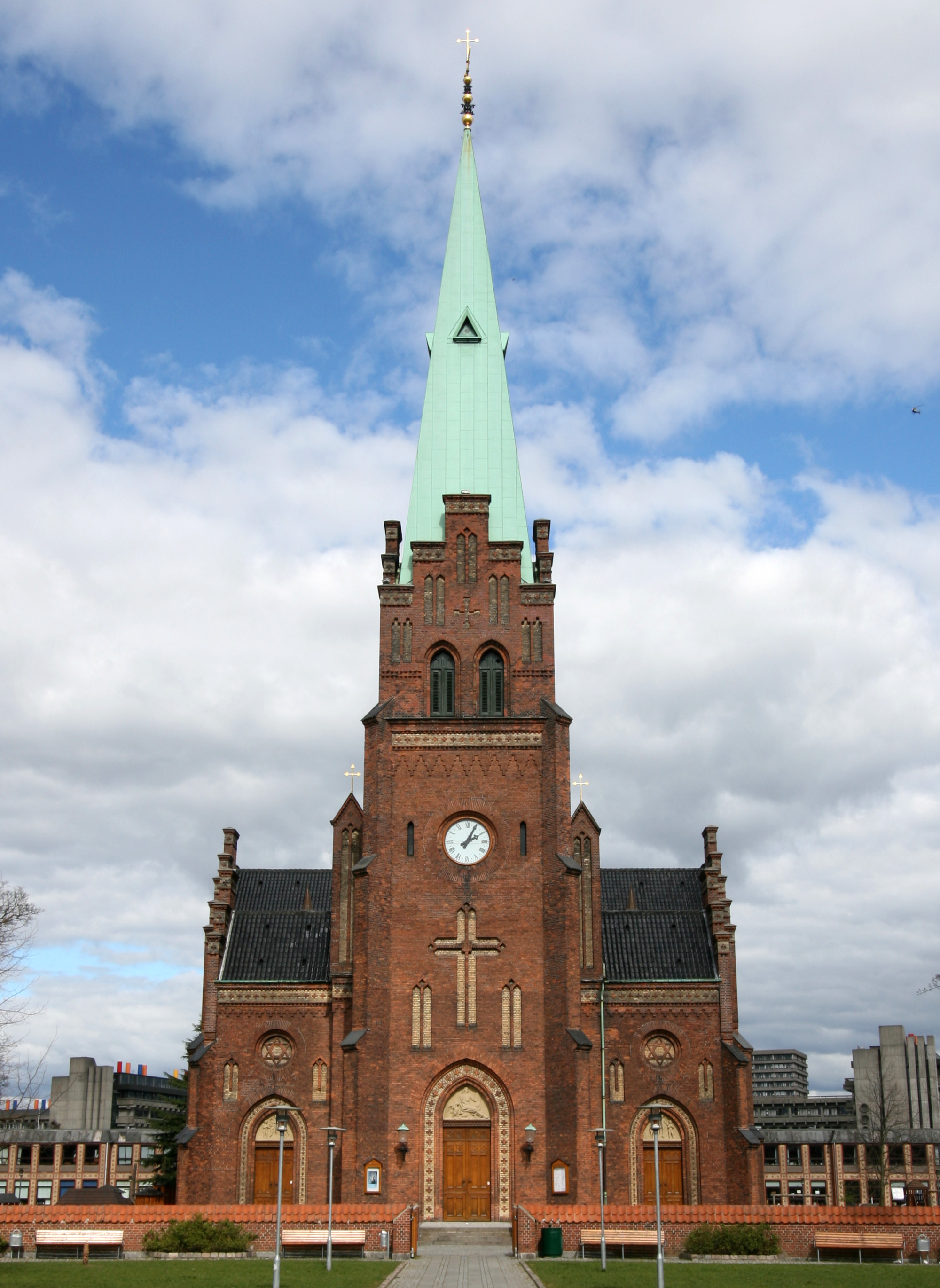
The church seen from Sankt Hans Torv

St. John's is a Neo-Gothic building in red brick. Standing 54 metres high, the tower has a copper-clad spire. Theodor Sørensen's style was greatly influenced by Michael Gottlieb Bindesbøll, and the three-gable motif of St. John's is also seen in Bindesbøll's Hobro Church.

St. John's was the first church in the Copenhagen area to revive Medieval features such as crow-stepped gables and pointed-arched windows. Its style was, on its completion, unusual in Denmark but soon won great popularity. The church was completed the same year as Copenhagen University Library, another building which combined red bricks and a Neo-Gothic design.

== Interior and furnishings ==
The interior of the church is dominated by light-coloured, marbled walls and columns. Painted by J. L. Lund in 1818 in Rome, the altarpiece depicts the Resurrection of Jesus. With 54 stops the church's organ is one of the largest in Copenhagen.

== Surroundings ==
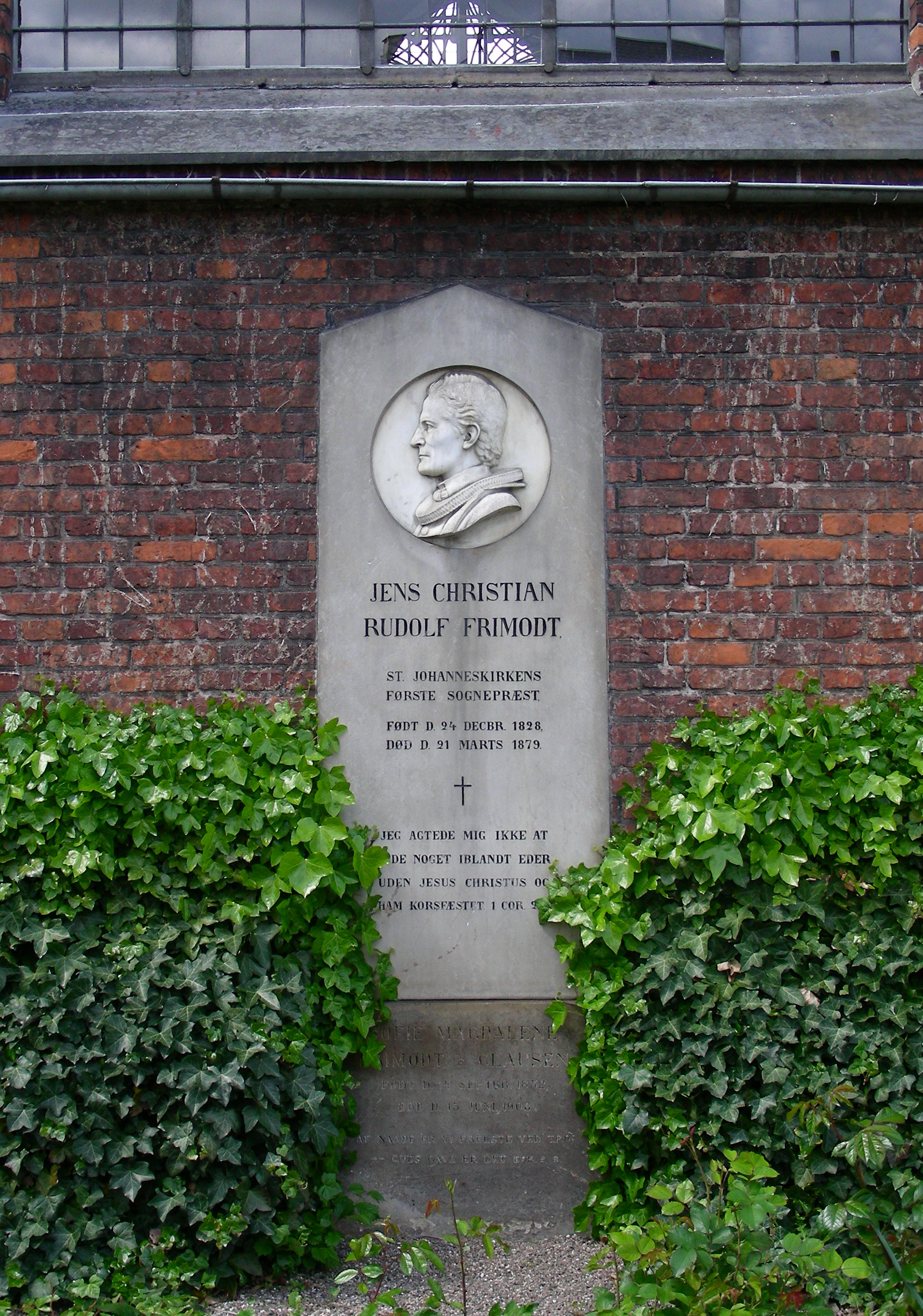
The J. C. R. Frimodt memorial

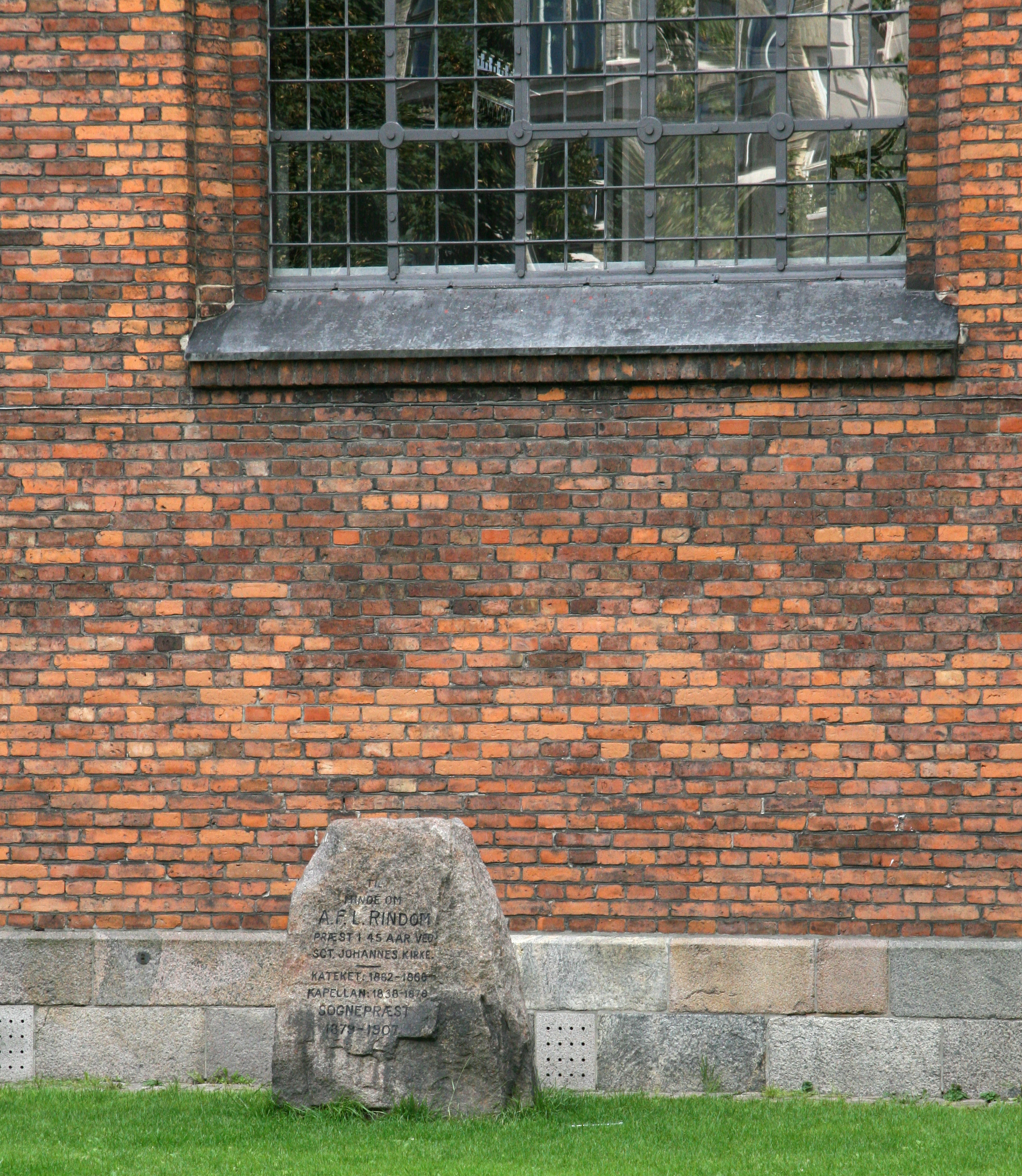
The J. C. R. Frimodt memorial

The areaoutside the church is confined by low walls in red brick. It is dominated by lawns and flower beds.

Jens Christian Rudolf Frimodt, the first pastor at the church, is buried outside the church. The headstone features a bronze relief portrait of him by August Saabye. His wife is also buried at the site. Axel Frederik Laurits Rindom (1838–1919), a later pastor at the church, is also commemorated by a stone outside the church.

== St. John's Church today ==
Located on Blegdamsvej, between Sankt Hans Torv and the Panum Institute, St. John's remains the largest church in the Nørrebro district. It is a parish church within the Church of Denmark. In December 2008, St. John's Parish combined with Simon's Parish to form Simon-St. John's Parish. The chapel at Rigshospitalet also belongs to the parish.

The church plays host to the student priest for University of Copenhagen's faculties of Health Sciences and Science, both located nearby.

== In popular culture ==
The church was used as a filming location in the 1941 film Frøken Kirkemus.

== See also ==
- Architecture of Denmark
