= Nørre Allé =

Street in Copenhagen, Denmark

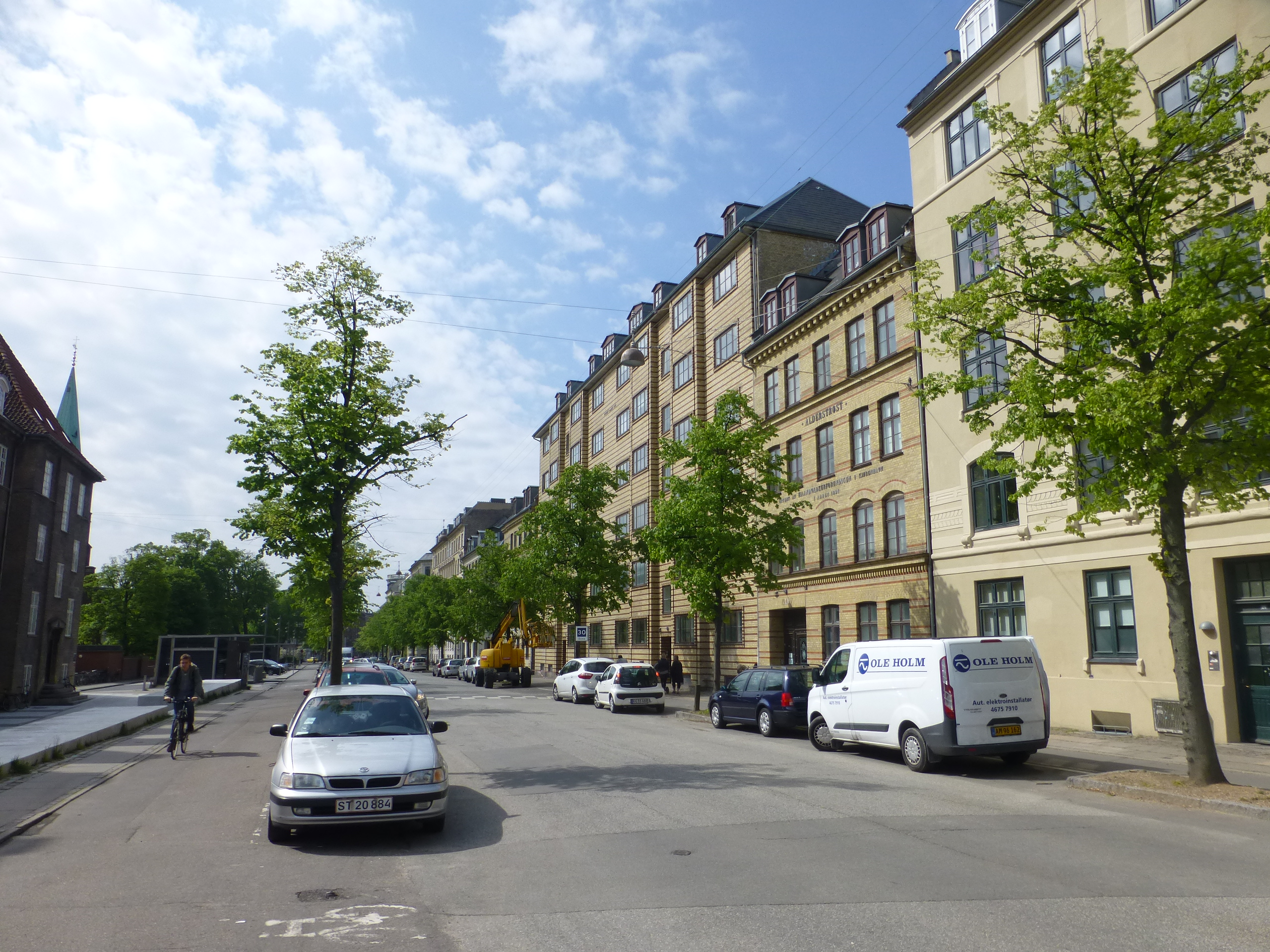
- Nørre Allé with the Alderstrøst charitable housing complex to the right
- Length: 1,650 m (5,410 ft)
- Location: Copenhagen, Denmark
- Quarter: Nørrebro
- Postal code: 2200
- Coordinates: 55°41′41.64″N 12°33′40.68″E
- South end: Sankt Hans Torv
- Major junctions: Tagensvej
- Noghn end: Vibenshus Runddel

Nørre Alle (lit. 'North Avenue') is a street in Copenhagen, Denmark, running from Blegdamsvej in Nørrebro in the south to Vibenshus Runddel in Østerbro in the north. It runs through University of Copenhagen's North Campus which is centred on its junction with Tagensvej. The section north of the junction, which separates Fælledparken to the east from the University Park to the west, is a busy artery. De Gamles By is situated on the west side of the more quiet, western portion.

== History ==
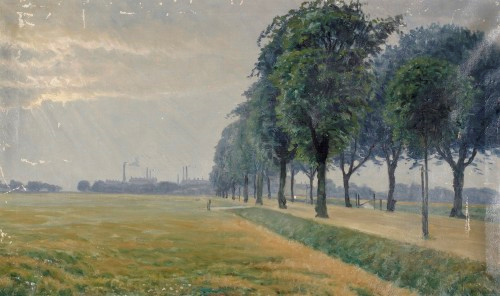
Nørre Allé, surrounded by Nørrefælled and with Nørrebro in the distance, on a painting from by Albert Wang from 1898

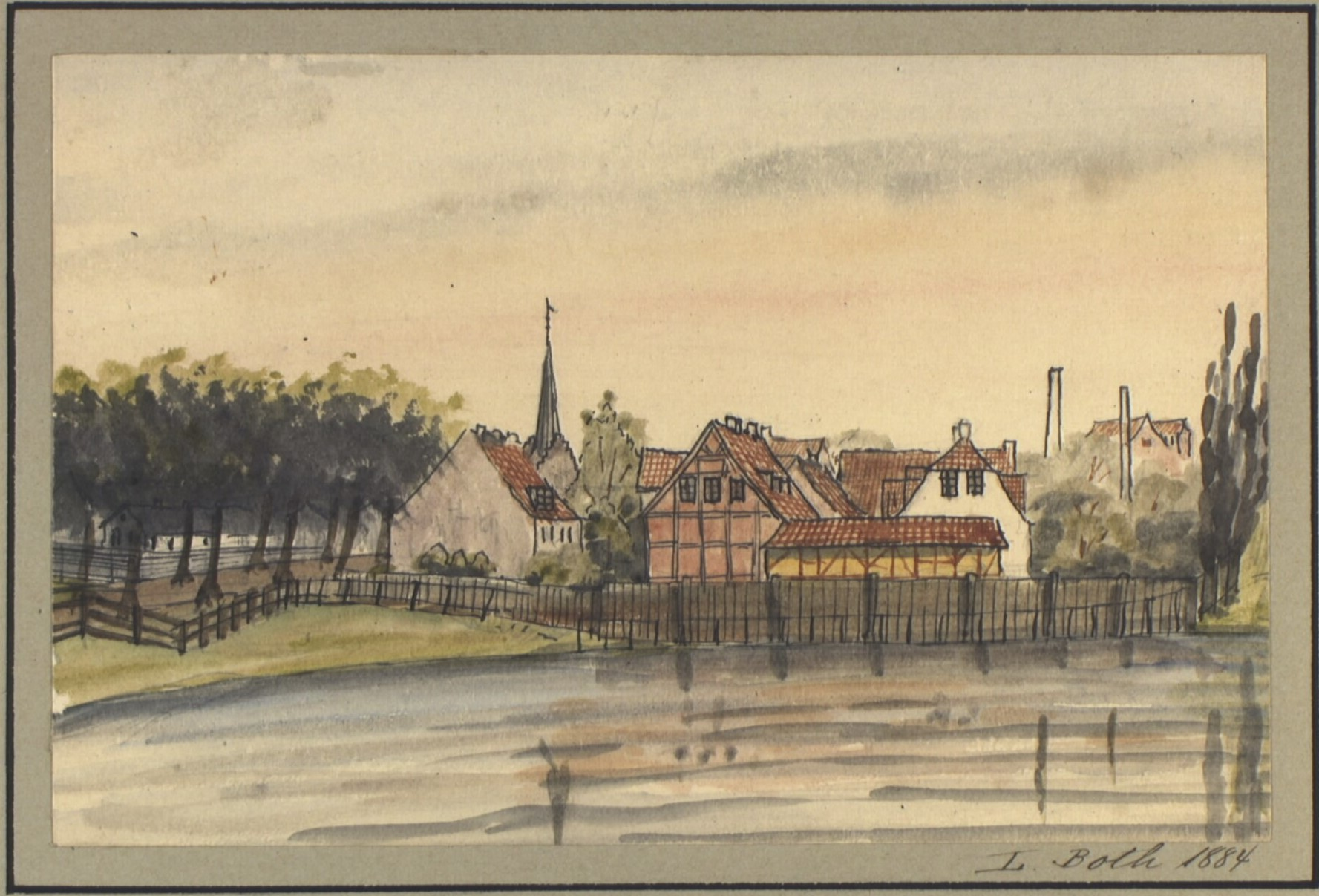
Buildings on Lammefælleden on a drawing by Ludvig Both, 1884

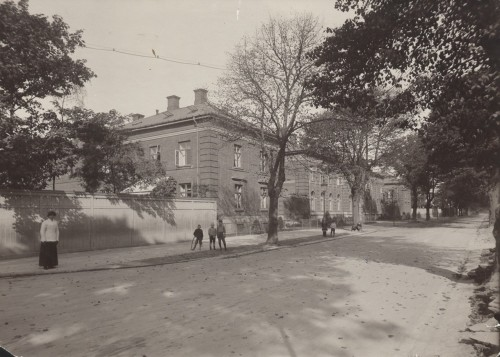
The administration building of Almindelig Hospital in the 1910s

The avenue was constructed across Nørrefælled (North Common) in 1744. It replaced an older road with almost the same course which is already seen on a map from 1695.

Almindeligt Hospital was located on the west side of the street from 1892 but relocated to the former Sankt Johannes Stiftelse in Ryesgade. The football club Akademisk Boldklub was based at the street from 1924 until the 1960s.

== Notable buildings and residents ==
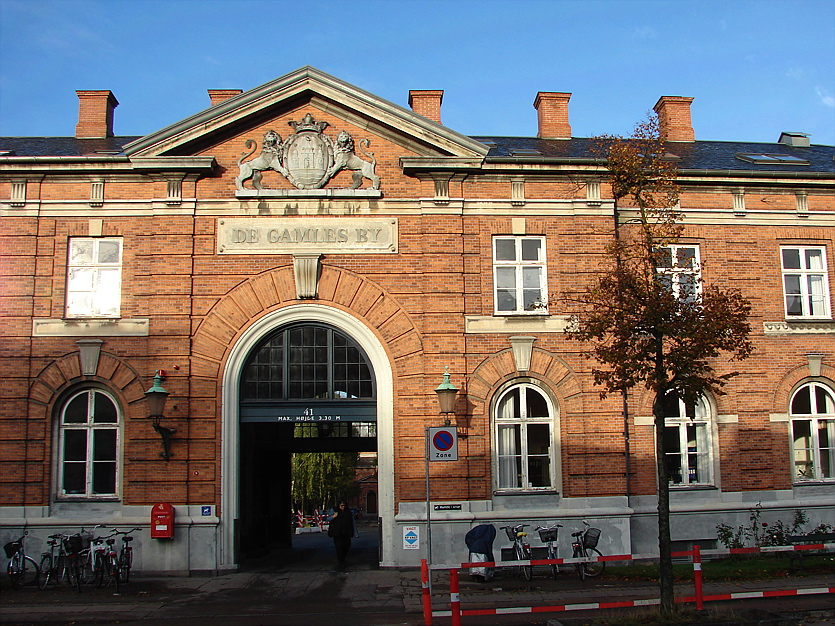
De Gamles By

Collegium Juris' building (No. 6) was built as residences for nurses at the nearby Blegdam Hospital in 1917 and was later expanded in 1934. It was adapted for its current use as dormitory at the initiative of UCPH's Faculty of Law by Lundgaard & Tranberg. The dormitory opened in 2012 and now houses 48 Danish and international students.

On the other side of the street, VerdensKulturCentret (No. 7) is a venue for cross cultural activities. It is located in a former municipal school building from 1887.

The Alderstrøst charitable housing complex (Nørre Allé 15–19) was built by Håndværkerforeningen and contained affordable housing for old craftsmen. The buildings at No. 15 and No. 19 were completed in 1895 to design by Thorvald Sørensen. The building at No. 17 was built in 1939 by Henning Hansen.

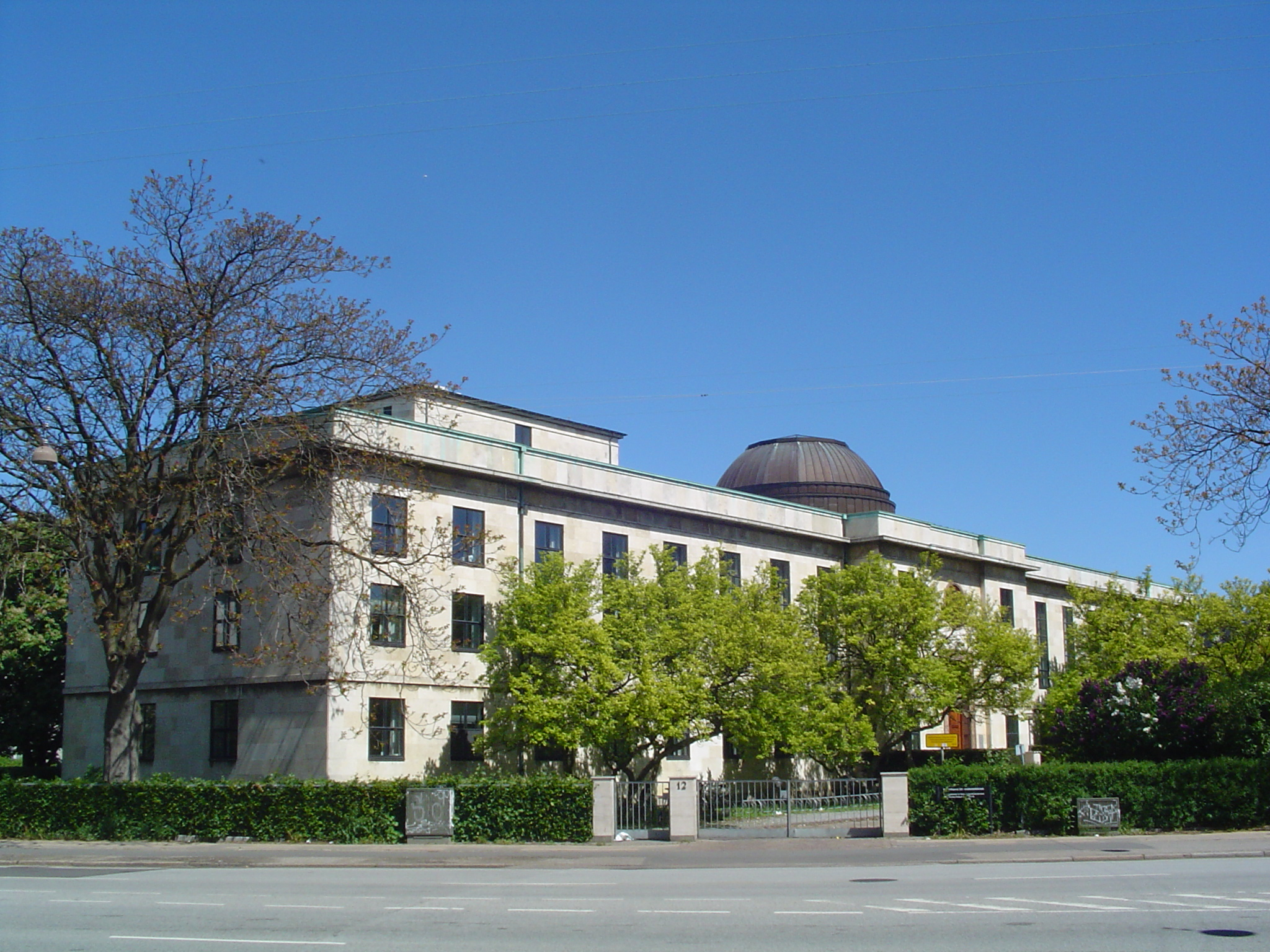
The Faculty Library of Natural and Health Sciences (KUB Nord), as seen across Tagensvej from the south

Almindeligt Hospital's former buildings (No. 41) are now part of the senior citizens home De Gamles By. The hospital buildings from the 1890s were designed by Vilhelm Petersen and the complex was expanded by Gotfred Tvede in 1910. The name De Gamles By was introduced for the whole site in 1919.

The Faculty Library of Natural and Health Sciences (KUB Nord) was built in 1935–37 to design by Noæs and Eva Koppel.

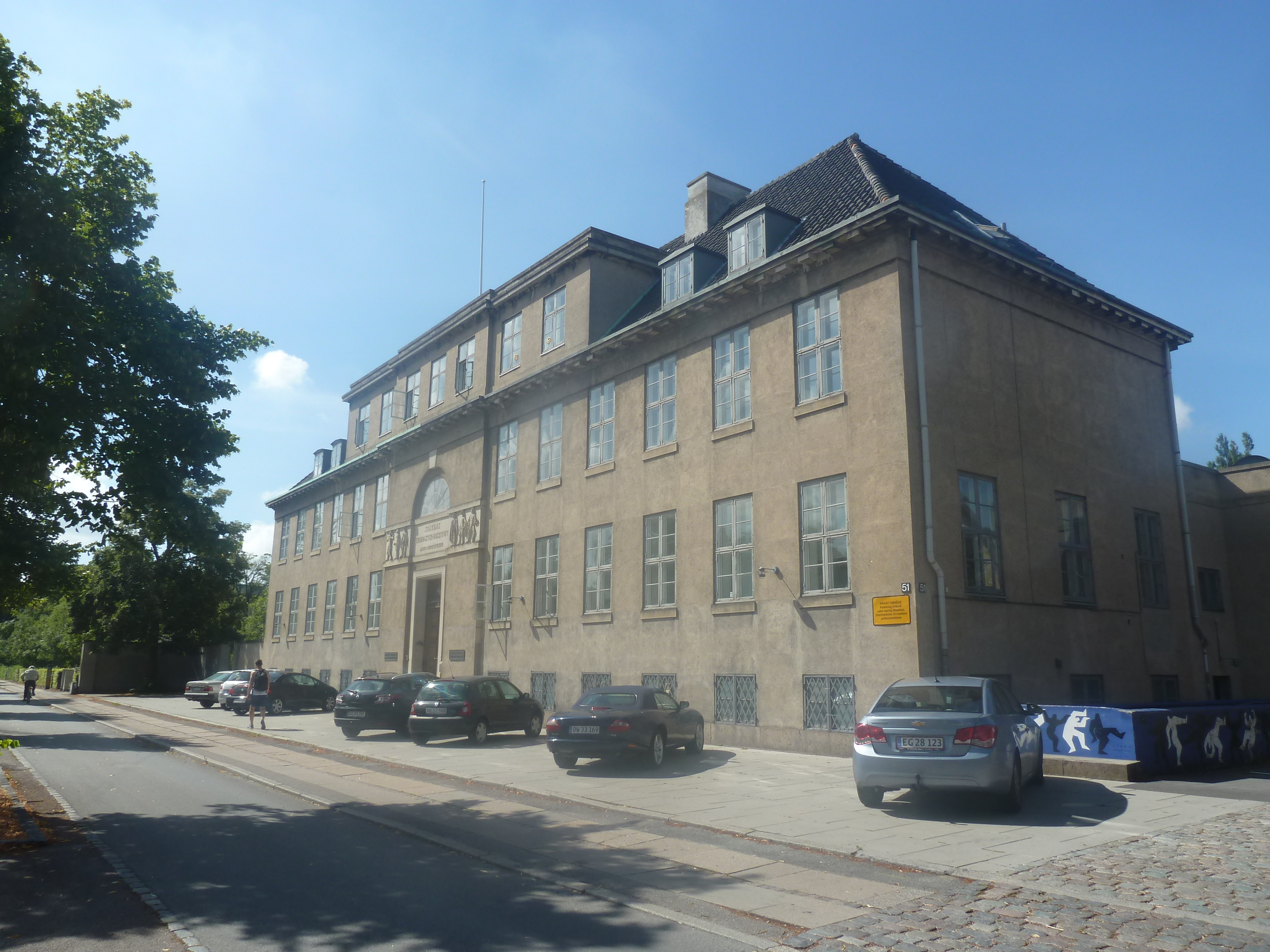
No. 51: Department of Nutrition, Exercise and Sports

A cancer care centre inspired by British Maggie's Centres opened on Nørre Allé in 2012. It is built to a distinctive multigabled design and encloses a central courtyard and various roof terraces.

UCPH's Department of Nutrition, Exercise and Sports is based at No. 51. The building is from 1924 and was originally constructed for the Danish Gymnastics Institute (Statens gymnastikinstitut) to design by Carl Brummer.

Egmont H. Petersen's Kollegium, usually referred to simply as Egmont Kollegiet, was built in the early 1950s and consists of three buildings called "Gamle" (Old), "Mellemste" (Middle) and "Nye" (New). It houses 492.

== Public art and memorials ==
In front of the university library is a statue by Gottfred Eickhoff from 1962 depicting the Danish scientist Nicolas Steno (Niels Steensen).

== Transport and parking ==
A BRT line between Nørreport station in the city centre and Ryparken station on Ringbanen runs through the street. It is served by up to 47 busses per hour per direction transporting approx. 30.000 passengers per day. One of the stations of the under construction City Circle Line will be located on the corner of Nørre Allé and Jagtvej at Vibenhus Eunddel.

The southern part of Nørre Allé is the site of an automated, underground parking facility with room for 164 cars. Similar APS facilities are located in Leifsgade in Islands Brygge and Under Elmene in Sundby.

== In popular culture ==
Several buildings on Nørre Allé has been used as a film location. Egmont Kollegiet has been used as a location in the films Skovridergaarden (1957), De sjove år (1959) and Pigen fra Egborg, (1969), The Institute of Dataology (Nørre Allé 61–63) is used as a location in the films My name is Petersen (1947), Pigen fra Egborg (1969) and Nattevagten (1994).
