= De Gamles By =

Home for the elderly in Copenhagen, Denmark

Coordinates: 55.6944°N 12.5583°E

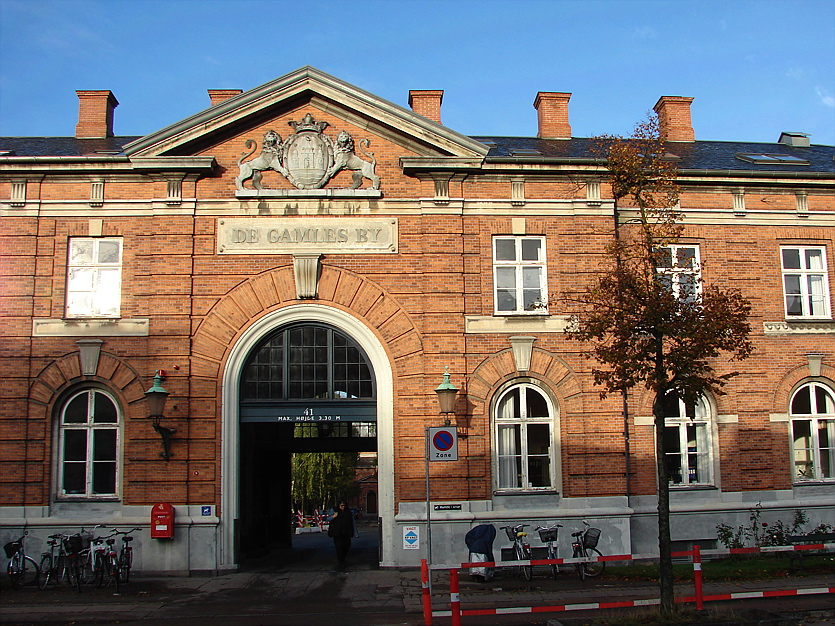
De Gamles By

De Gamles By is a home for the elderly in the Nørrebro district of Copenhagen, Denmark. It has been integrated with the surrounding community and is now also home to other facilities, including kindergartens, a cancer care facility and urban gardens.

== History ==
Almindelig Hospital relocated to the site in 1892. Its new buildings were designed by Vilhelm Petersen. In 1901, it was later joined by a home for the elderly, Københavns Alderdomshjem, whose buildings were designed by Gotfred Tvede. The name De Gamles By was introduced for the whole site in 1919, while Almindeligt Hospital took over the former Sankt Johannes Stiftelse in Ryesgade.

== Chapel ==
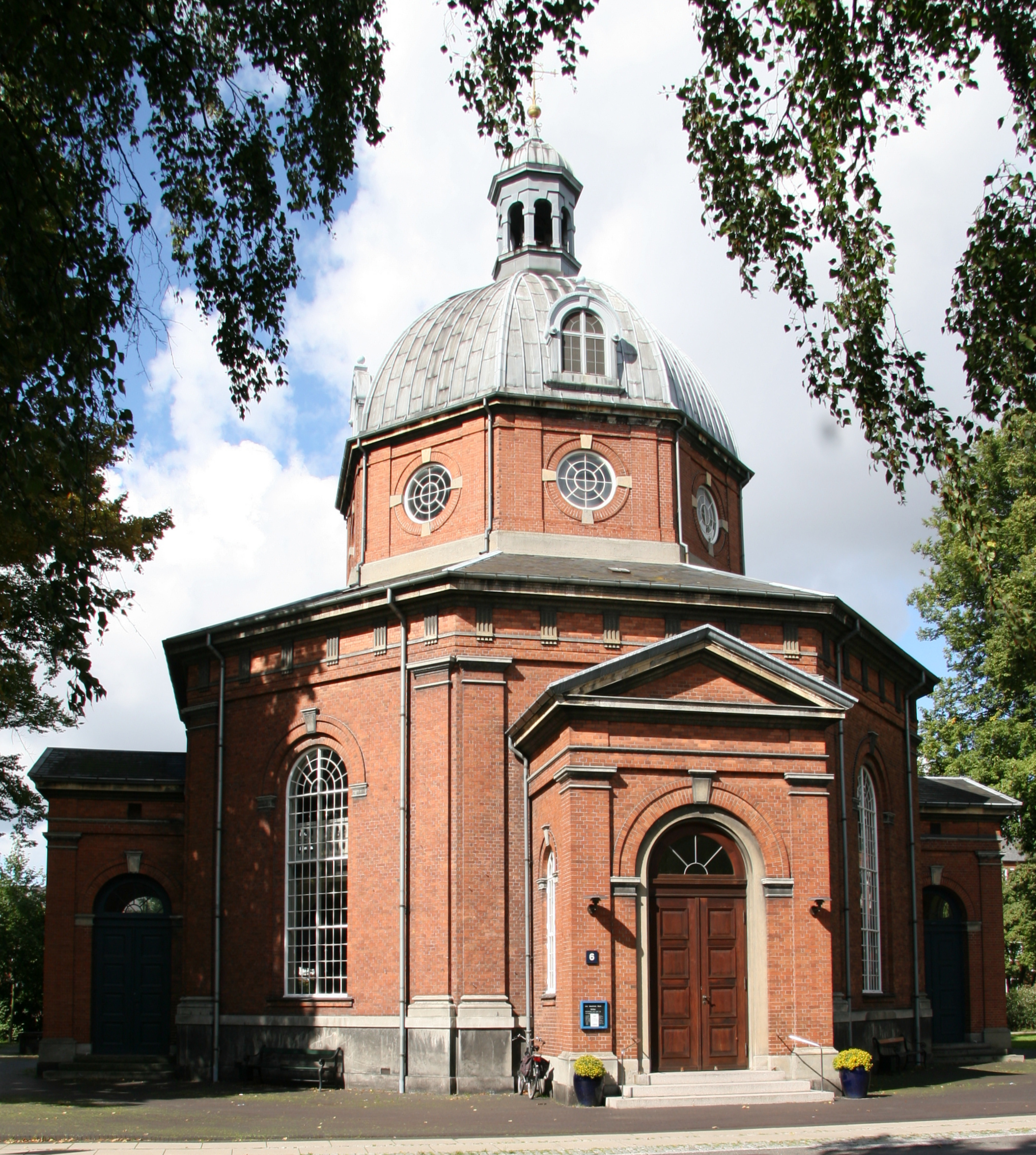
The chapel

De Gamles By has its own church, which was built as part of the original hospital complex from 1892. Its architect was Vilhelm Petersen who also designed the other hospital buildings.

== Redevelopment ==
A cancer care centre inspired by British Maggie's Centres opened on Nørre Allé in 2012. It is built to a distinctive multigabled design and encloses a central courtyard and various roof terraces.

Two new day cares, one on Møllegade and one on Sjællandsgade, are planned in the area.
