= Heimdalsgade =

Street in Copenhagen, Denmark

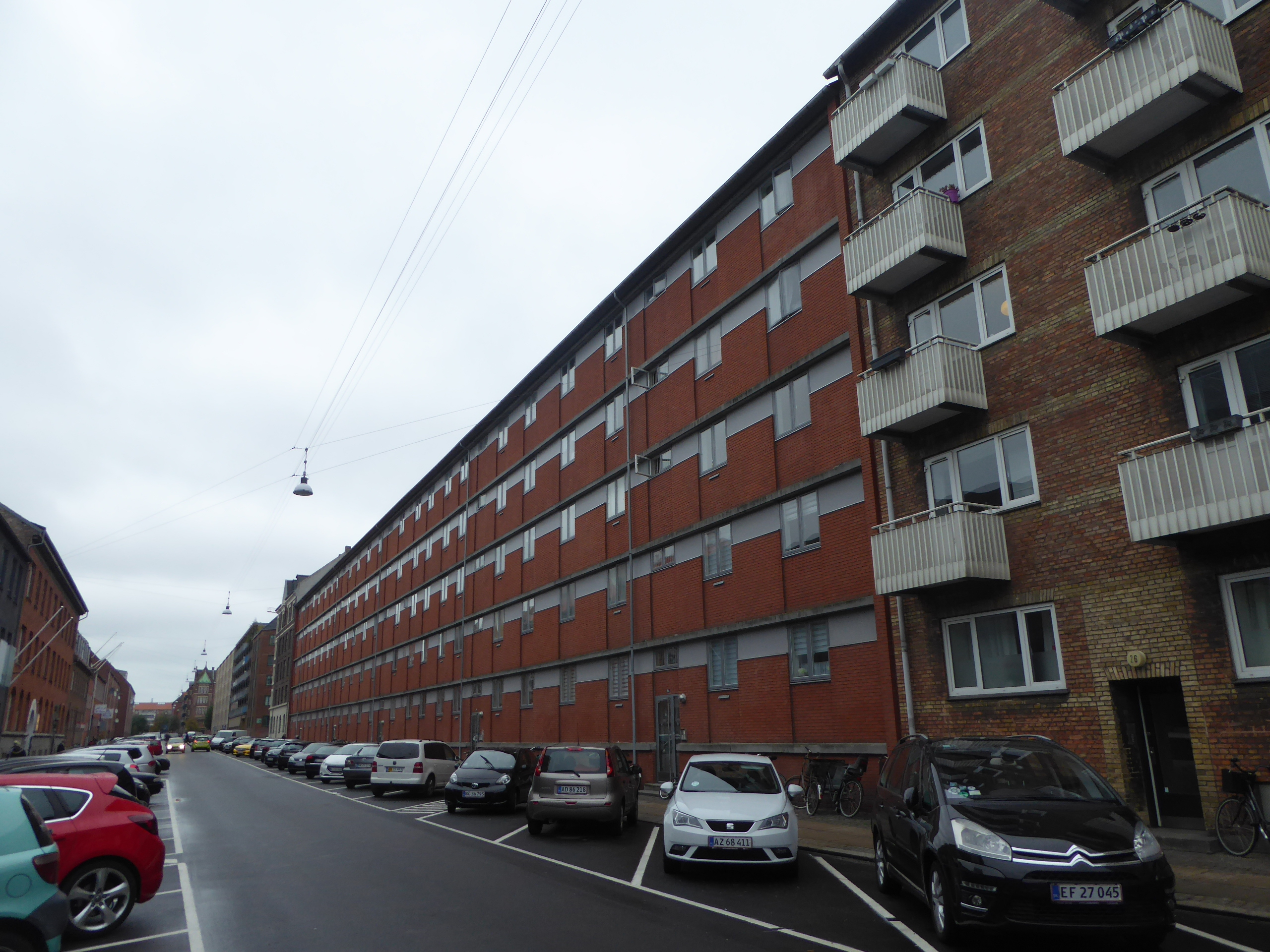
Heimdalsgade

Heimdalsgade is a street in the Outer Nørrebro district of Copenhagen, Denmark. It runs from Nørrebrogade in the southwest to Tagensvej in the northeast. A short section of the street, from Mimersgade to Slejpnersgade, disappeared when Superkilen was established.

== History ==
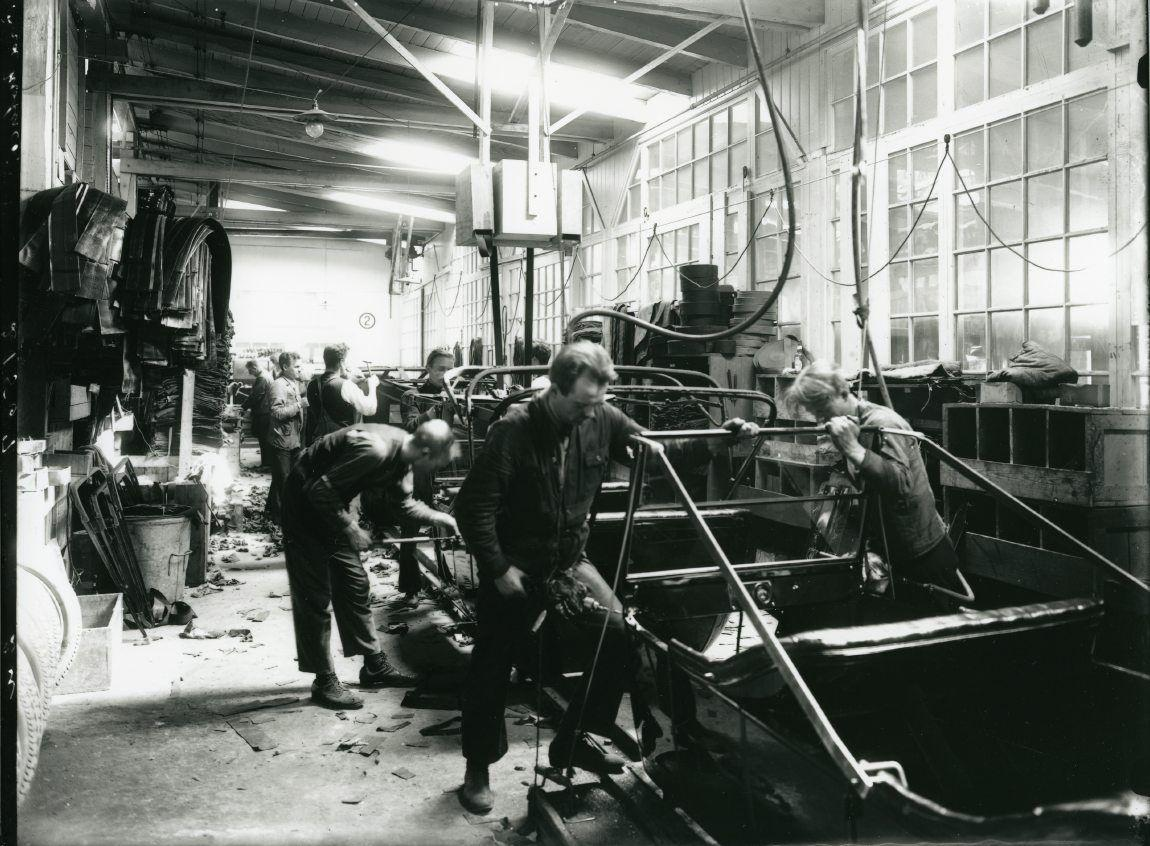
The Ford assembly plant in Heimdalsgade

The street is visible on old maps of the area but was originally referred to simply as "The Road that leads to Rådmandsmarken9". One of the first buildings in the area, Petershvile, was located at the beginning of the road. It took its name after renteskriver Peter Feddersen, a wealthy government official from Copenhagen. The name is first seen on a map from 1795 but the same property is on a map from 1654 referred to as Nissedal.

The first new streets in the outer Norrebro area were established in the late 1850s. Heimdalsgade was given its current name in 1892. A rubber factory, Gummi – og Luftningsfabrikker, opened in the street in 1896. The name of the factory was later changed to Schiønning & Arve. In 1910–12, Ford Motor Company established an assembly plant in the street at No. 42. The plant served the markets in Sweden, Norway, Finland, Germany and Poland. In 1924, it had become too small and a state-of-the-art assembly plant was therefore constructed at Teglholmen in the Southern Docklands.

Berlingske Media's book printing activities were based at No. 32 in 1955–1975. Engelsk-Dansk Biscuits Fabrik, a manufacturer of biscuits, was based at No. 35–37 in 1912–1978, The building was designed by Olaf Petri. An extension, used for production of Kellogg's Corn Flakes and Rice Krispies, was inaugurated in 1957. Dansk Fedt- og Palminfabrik was based at No. 40 from 1912 to 1920. The building was after that operated as a bread factory by Schulstad until the 1950s. Another bread factory, De forenede Bagermestres Rugbrødsfabrik. was located at No. 41 in 1897–1976.

== Notable buildings and residents ==
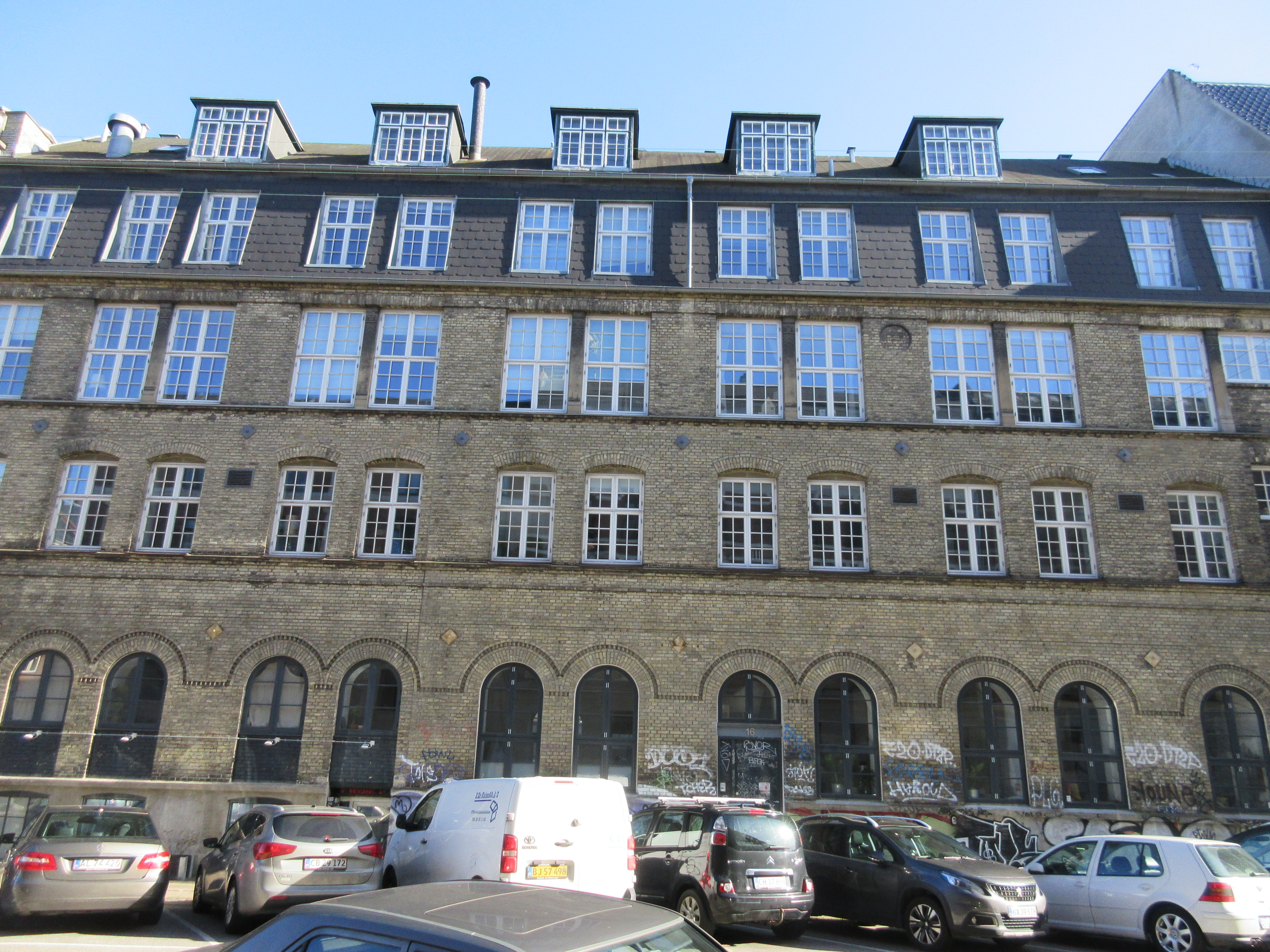
No. 14-15: Hintz & Co.'s former chocolate factory

Hintz & Co.'s former chokolaste factory (No. 14-16) was constructed in 1914–26. The building was later taken over by Dansk Læder- og Skotøjsindustri . It has now been converted into apartments.

== Transport ==
The Nørrebro station, served both by S-trains and the Copenhagen Metro City Circle Line (M3), is located approximately 265 metres from the southwestern end of the street along Nørrebrogade.

== See also ==
- Bragesgade
