= Thorsgade =

Street in Copenhagen Municipality, Denmark

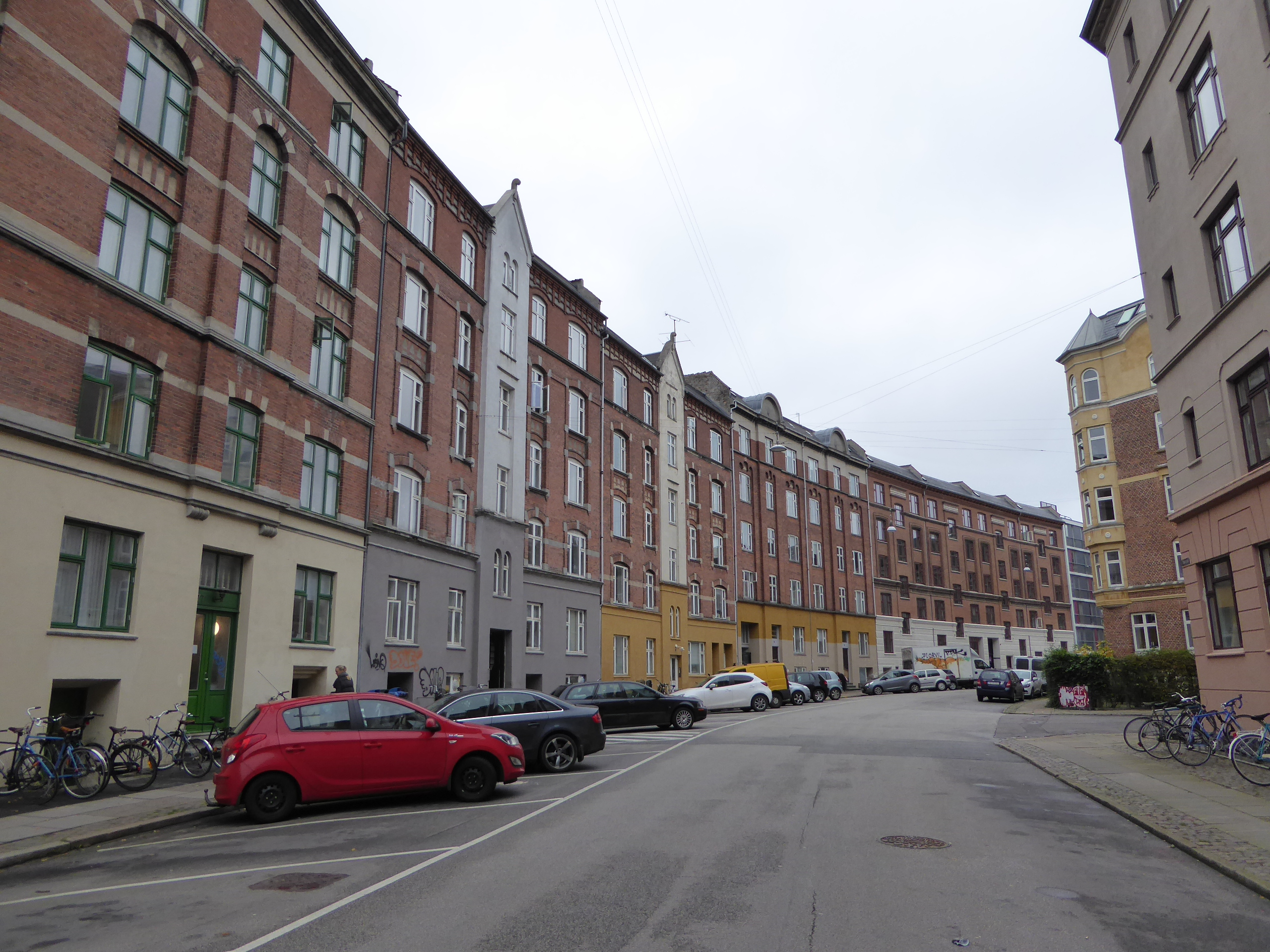
- Length: 632 m (2,073 ft)
- Location: Copenhagen, Denmark
- Quarter: Nørrebro
- Postal code: 2200
- Nearest metro station: Nørrebros Runddel
- Coordinates: 55°41′51.63″N 12°32′59.14″E
- Southwest end: Nørrebrogade
- Major junctions: Mimersgade
- Northeast end: Tagensvej

Thorsgade (lit. 'Thor Street') is a mainly residential street in the Mimersgade Quarter of Nørrebro in Copenhagen, Denmark, linking Nørrebrogade in the southwest to Tagensvej in the northeast. The first part of the street is only open to one-way traffic in the direction from Nørrebrogade to Dagmarsgade. The street takes its name after the Norse god Thor. The now decommissioned Samuel's Church is located at No. 65.

Thorsparken, a small public park between Thorsgade and Allersgade, offers facilities such as a playground, soccer cage, picnic tables and benches.

== History ==
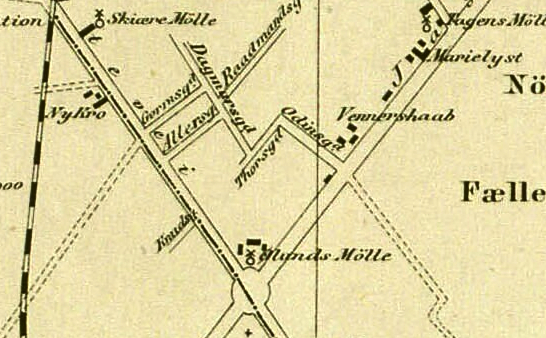
Thorsgade—still not extended to Nørrebrogade—seen on a map detail from 1868

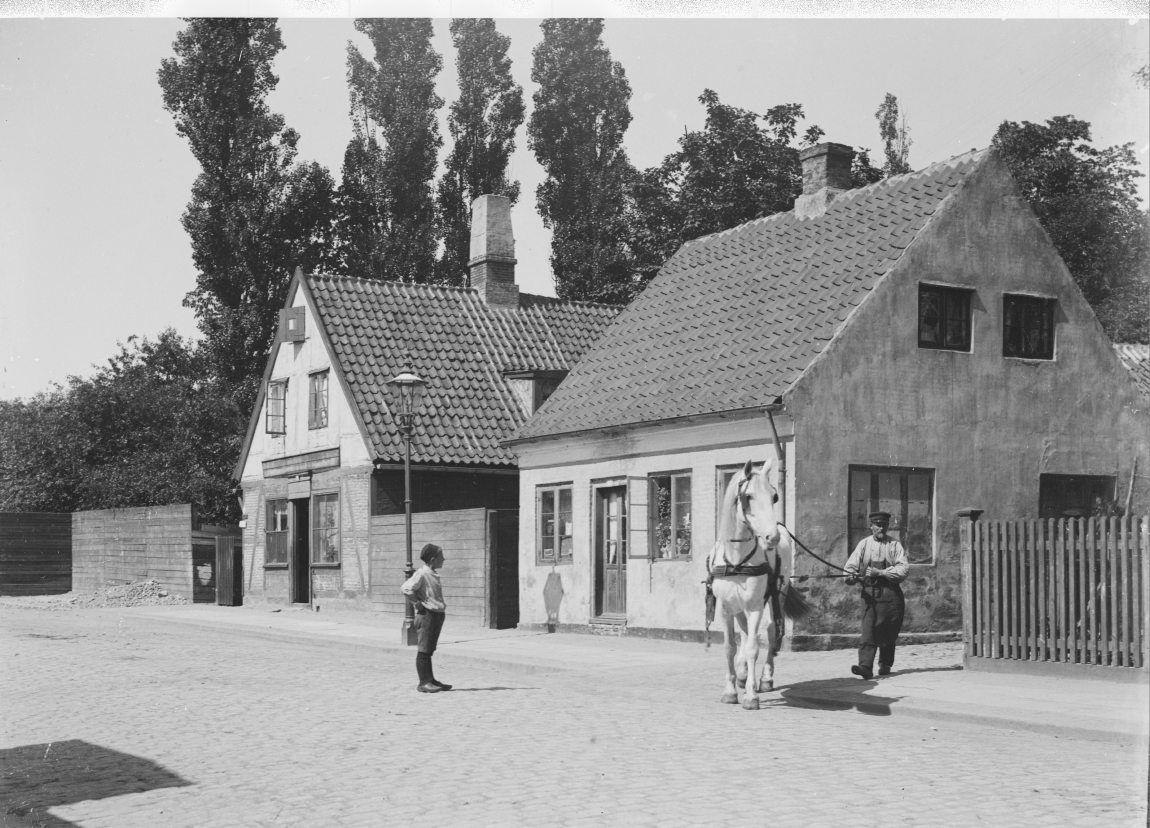
Thorsgade 45 - 47 photographed by Fritz Theodor Benzen in June 1902

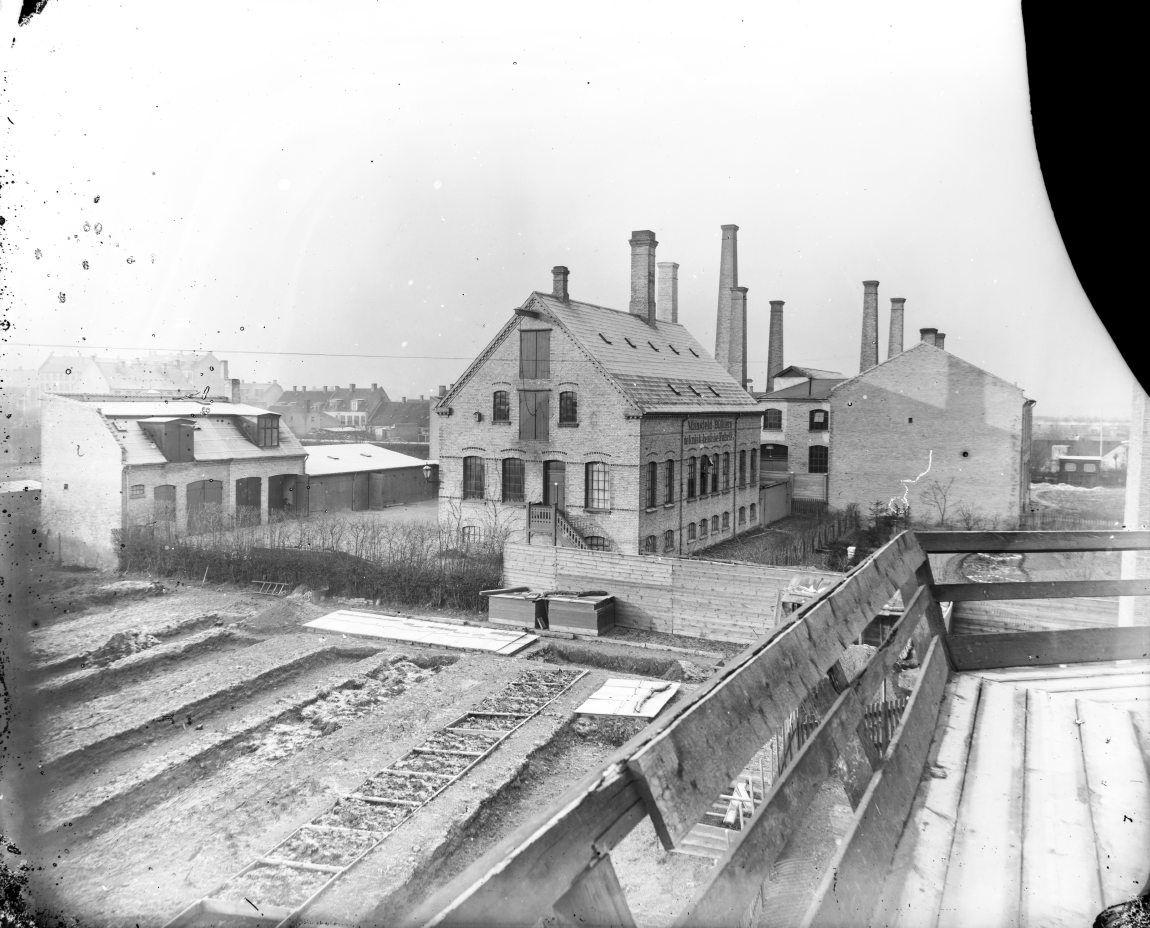
Mansfeld Hollners Teknisk Kemiske Fabrik photographed from the gallery of Tagen's Mill by Frederik Riise

Created in 1863, Thorsgade is one of the oldest streets in the Outer Nørrebro area. It is also one of the first streets in Nørrebro named with inspiration from Norse mythology. It was initially just a short street that linked Dagmarsgade with Odinsgade. At the time of the 1870 census, Thorsgade was still only home to 22 families and It only consisted of five house numbers (No. 1-5 and No. 2-4). The street was towards the end of the century extended to Nørrebrogade (then Lygtevej) in one end and to Mimersgade (then Rosagade ) in the other.

The street was not extended from Mimersgade to Tagensvej until the late 1910s. The site where Thorsgade meets Tagensvej had until then been the site of a windmill named Tagensmølle and Mansfeld Hollners Teknisk Kemiske Fabrik (Mansfeld Hollner's Technical Chemical Factory). Tagensmølle was later renamed Jagtvejens Mølle og Brødfabrik (Jagtvej Mill & Bread Factory. It was demolished in 1917.

== Buildings ==
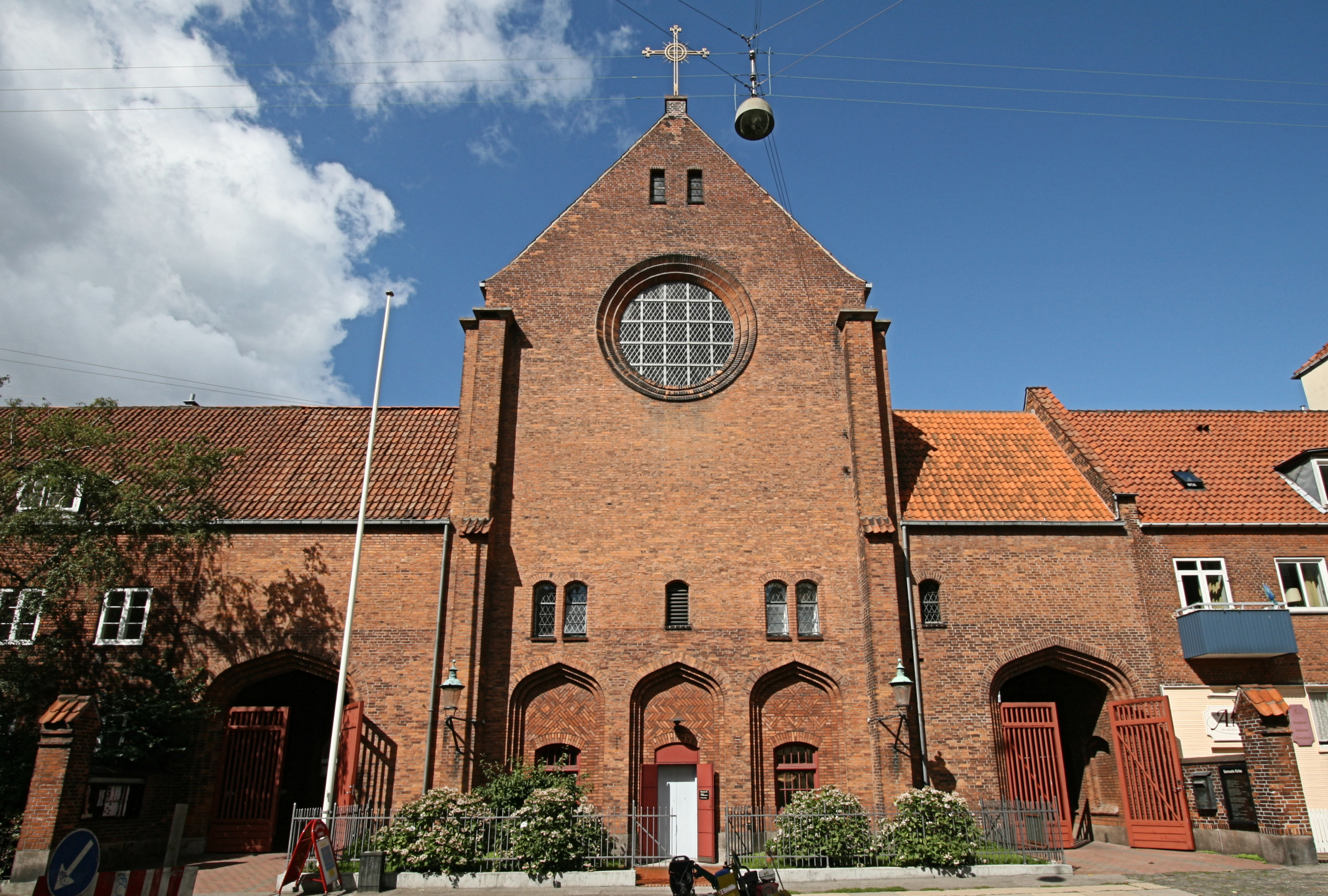
No. 65: Samiel's Church prior to the conversion into youth housing

Samuel's Church (No. 65) was built in 1924–32 to designs by the architect Carl Schøitz. It was decommissioned in 2013 as one of six Church of Denmark churches in Copenhagen. It has now been converted into youth housing.. The building is now known as Samuels Hus and contains 34 dwellings.

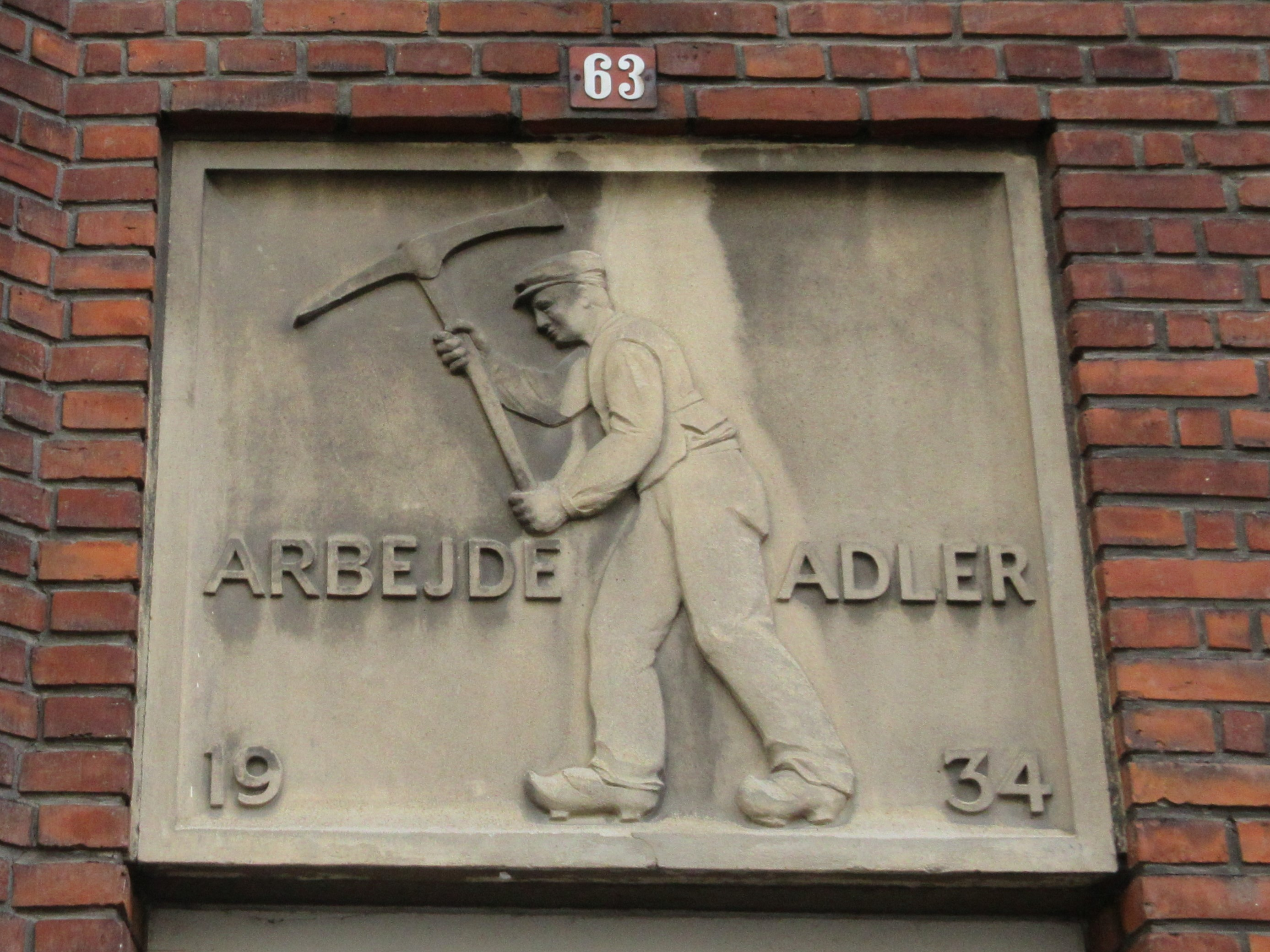
No. 63: The Arbejde Adler Building

The neighboring building (Mp. 63) was built for a charity called Arbejde Adler ("Work Ennobles") in 1934. A relief above the door depicts a worker with a hoe and wooden shoes.

Thorsgadekollegiet (No. 85-97) is from 2004 to 2005 and was designed by Triarc. It contains 46 dwellings for students.

== Thorsparken ==
Thorsparken occupies a rectangular space between Thorsgade in the southeast and Allersgade in the northwest. Facilities include a playground, soccer cage, picnic tables and benches. The playground was most recently refurbished in 2009.

== Transport ==
The nearest Copenhagen Metro station is Nørrebros Runddel. The first part of the street is only open to one-way traffic in the direction from Nørrebrogade to Dagmarsgade.

== Cultural references ==
Thorsgade plays a dominant role in Poul Kragelund's memoirs from Nørrebro and Vangede Så vidt jeg husker ("As Far As I Recall It"). His grand parents lived in the street.

== See also ==
- Bragesgade
- Prinsesse Charlottes Gade
