= Nørrebrogade =

Street in Copenhagen, Denmark

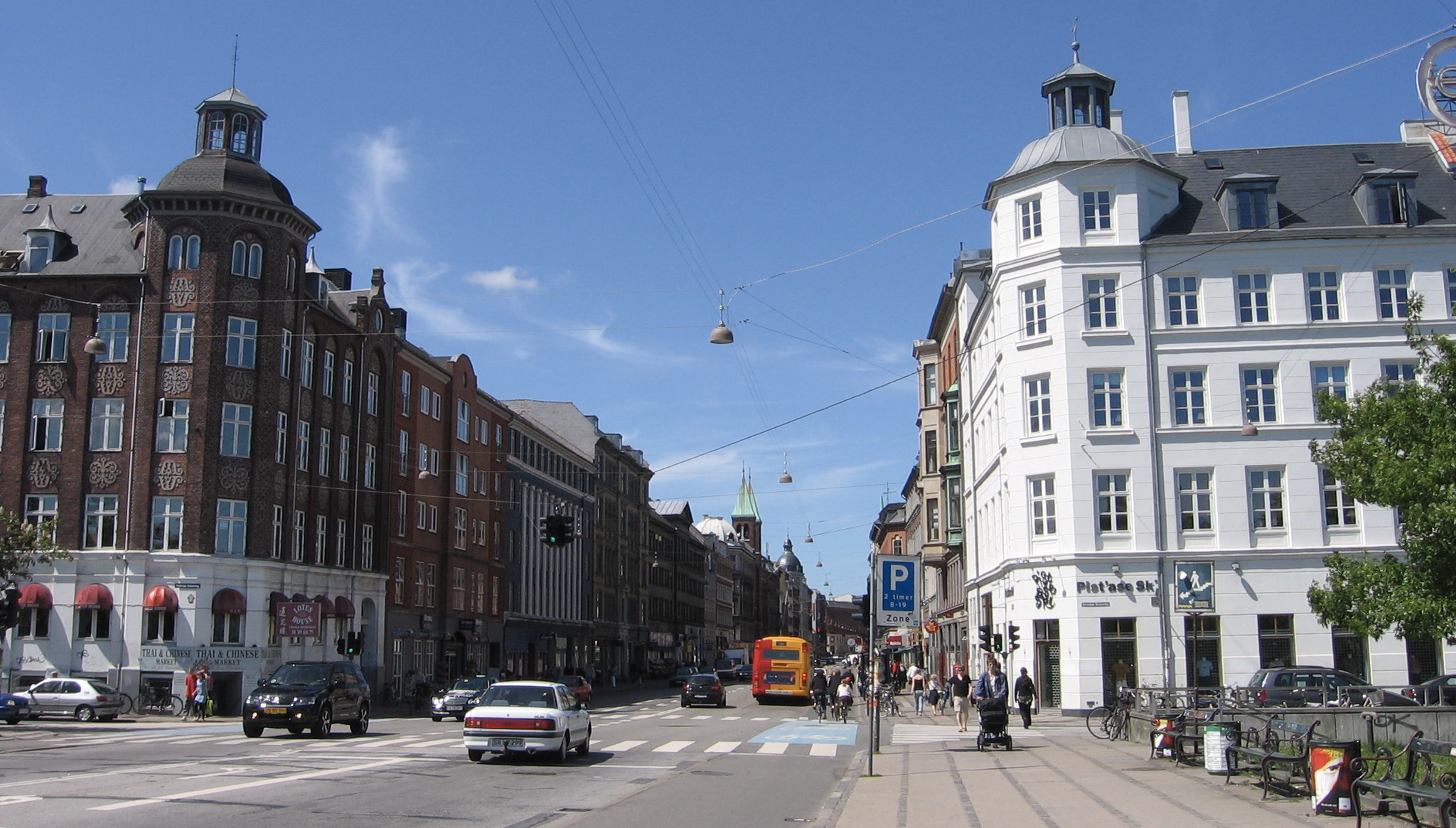
- Interactive map of Nørrebrogade
- Length: 2,150 m (7,050 ft)
- Location: Copenhagen, Denmark
- Quarter: Nørrebro
- Postal code: 2200
- Nearest metro station: Nørrebro station
- Coordinates: 55°41′31.92″N 12°33′7.2″E
- Southeast end: Dronning Louises Bro
- Major junctions: Jagtvej
- Northwest end: Frederikssundsvej

Nørrebrogade is the principal shopping street of the Nørrebro district of Copenhagen, Denmark. It runs from The Lakes in the southeast to Nørrebro station in the northwest, linking Frederiksborggade and Queen Louise's Bridge with Frederikssundsvej. The street passes Assistens Cemetery, Nørrebro Runddel and the Superkilen linear park. Buildings include the multipurpose venue Nørrebrohallen and two churches.

== Location ==
The approximately 2,150 m long street runs from Sortedam Dossering at Queen Louise's Vridge in the southwast to Nørrebro railway station in the northwest. The first leg of the street—from Sortedam Dossering to Nørrebros Runddel—is approximately 1m979 m long. The section from Sortedam Dossering to Griffenfeldsgade runs in a west-northwesterly direction. From there it continues in a more northwesterly direction to Nørrebro Runddel. The side streets that extend from the southwestern side of the street are Blågårdsgade, Slotsgade, Stengade, Griffenfeldsgade, Solitudevej and Kapelvej. The streets which extend from the northeast side of the street are Ravnsborggade, Fælledvej, Elmegade, Peter Fabers Gade, Møllegade, Meinungsgade, Frederik VII's Gade, Sjællandsgade and Fynsgade.

The next leg of the street—from Nørrebros Runddel to Superkilen—is approximately 700 m long. The most important side streets which extend from the southwest side of the street of the street are Stefensgade and Hillerødgade. The street which extend from the northeast side of this stretch of the street are Uffesgade, Thoragade, Allersgade, Gormsgade, Ægirsgade, Baldersgade and Bragesgade.

The last leg of the street—from Superkilen to Nørrebro Station—is approximately 330 m long. The streets which extend from the northeast side of this stretch of the street are Heimdalsgade, Loe Jørgensens Gade, Borgmestervangen and Mimersgade. The only side streets which extend from the other side of this stretch of the street are Esromgade and Hyldekrogen as well as a cul-de-sac which is part of Nørrebrogade.

== History ==
=== Early history ===
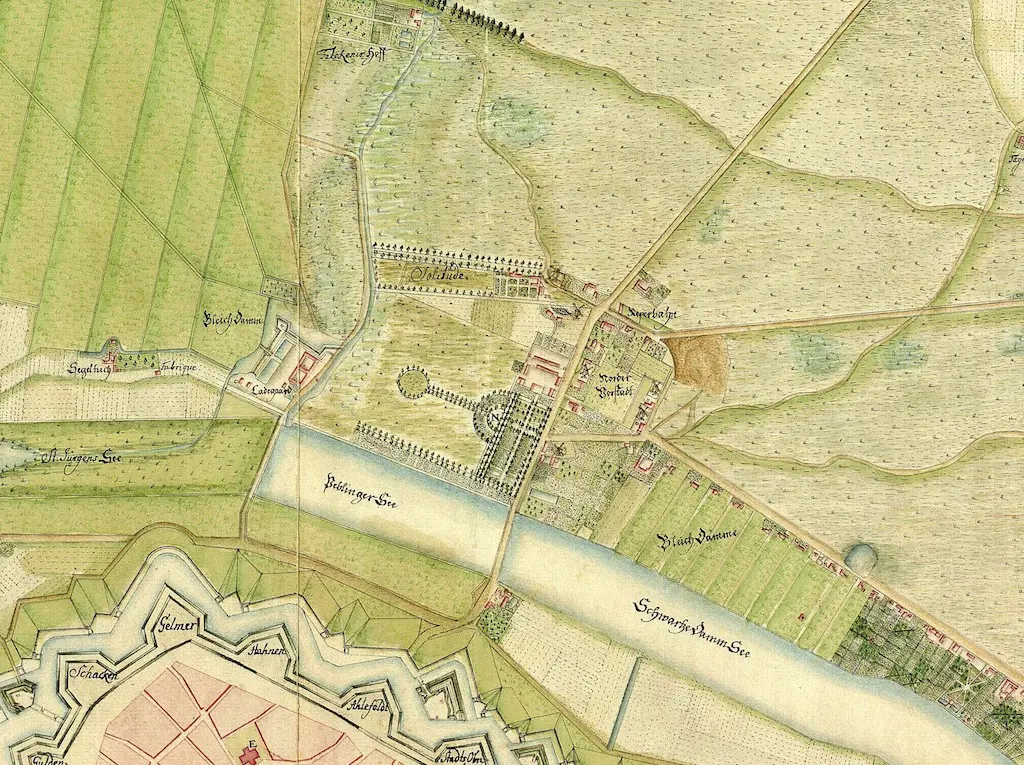
Blågård and Solitude seen in a detail from Johan Friedrich Meyer's Frederik V's Atlas, 1742

Nørrebrogade originates in the road that led in and out of Copenhagen's Northern City Gate. Few buildings were located along the road due to the so-called Demarcation Line which enforced restrictions on the construction of buildings outside Copenhagen's fortifications.

The road continued to the villages Brønshøj, Utterslev and Husum and onwards to Frederikssund Nørre Allé branched off from the road, shortly after crossing Peblinge Lake, providing as link to Vibenshus Runddel and Lyngby Kongevej.

The country houses Blågård was constructed by Prince Charles on the southwest side of the road in 1706. Its driveway was located where the street Slotsgade runs today. The country house Solitude was constructed on an adjacent site by Ulrich Adolph Holstein in 1720. The two country houses were later joined by the beer garden and entertainment venue Lille Ravnsborg.

Assistens Cemetery was established on the southwest side of the street in 1760. Opposite the cemetery was a long ropewalk, approximately where Prinsesse Charlottesvej runs today.

Towards the end of the 18th century, the intersection of Østerbrogade and Jagtvej was laid out as a large circular space, later known as Nørrebros Runddel (Nørrebro Circle). The section from Nørrebros Runddel to the Ladegård Canal passed through an area known as Lløvermarken (not to be confused with the similarly named area on Amager). This part of the road was originally known as Lygtevejen (Lantern Road). The name referred to Lygtekroen (The Lantern Inn), so named because a lantern outside the inn helped travellers find their way in the night time. A few country houses were constructed along the road, including Ventegodt, Petersminde and Peterslyst.

=== Gradual urbanizations, 1850—1900 ===
In 1852, the Demarcation Line was finally moved from Jagtvej to the Lakes. The land along the road was subsequently built over, first with low buildings, usually just one or two storeys tall, most of which were later replaced by taller buildings.

S. H. Lydvigsen established a factory on the street in 1939 (Nørrebrogade 39). The company produced some of the first WCs and central heating systems in Copenhagen. The SMith / Mygind machine factory was founded in a former stable opposite Assistens Cemetery in 1872.

== Notable buildings and residents ==
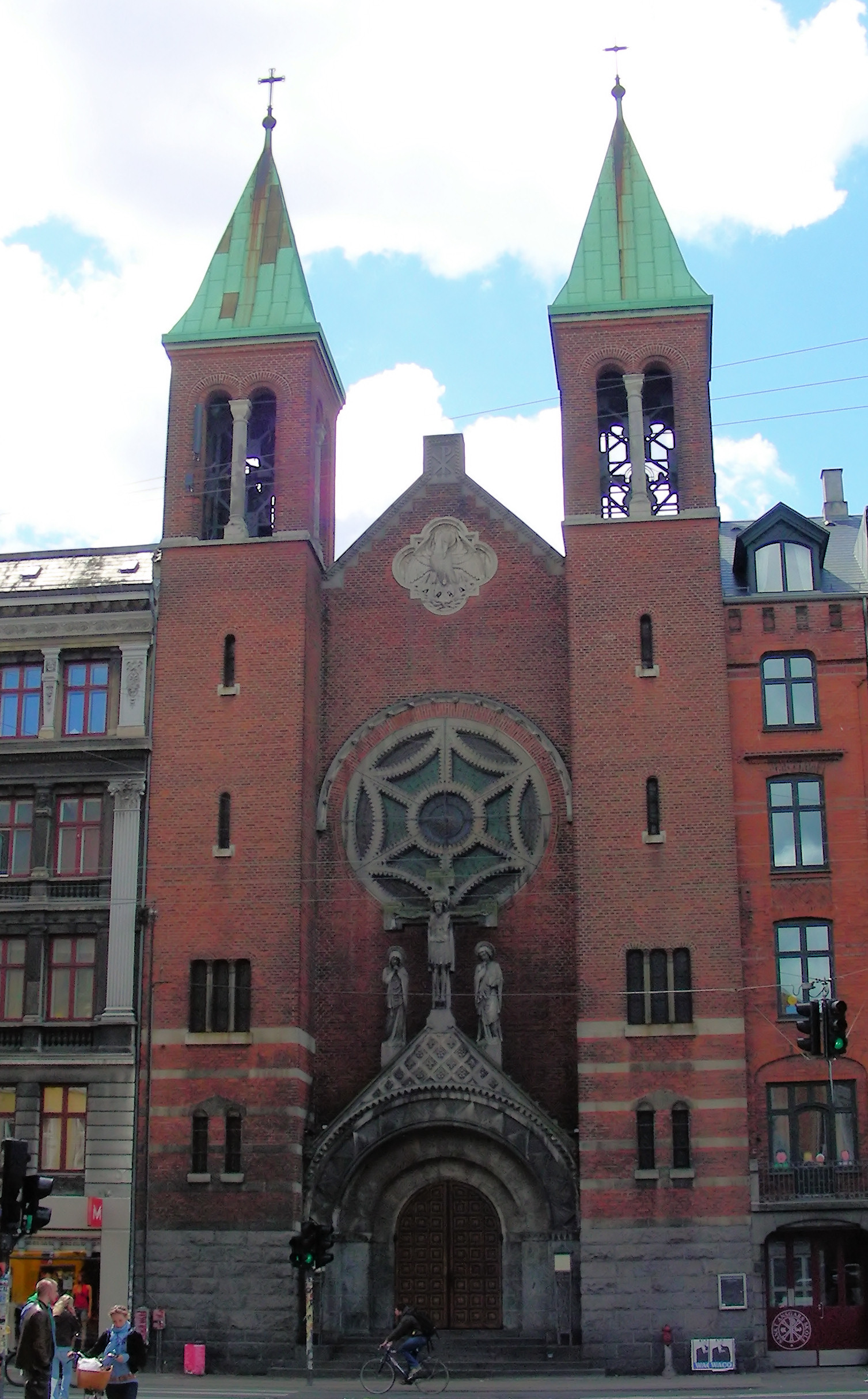
No. 27: The Sacrament Church

Alderstrøst (No. 9) was built by Håndværkerforeningen in 1860 - 1862 to provide affordable housing for old craftsmen. The Neoclassical building was designed by Theodor Sørensen. It was later followed by another housing complex by the same name on Nørre Allé.

The Sacrament Church (No. 27), located as a point de vue opposite Fælledvej, is a Roman Catholic church. It was consecrated in 1917.

Rud. Rasmussen's furniture workshop (No. 45) was established at the site in the 1870s and is still active in the manufacturing of many Danish furniture classics. The complex consists of a residential building on Nørrebrogade from 1895, a factory building facing Stengade from 1876 and a factory building with Mansard roof from 1911 designed by Alfred Thomsen in the courtyard. The complex was declared a Danish Industrial Heritage Site in 2007 and was listed in 2008.

The Gravedigger's House (No. 67) was built in 1805 by Jens Bang. The building was listed in 1959. KEA – Copenhagen School of Design and Technology's Empire Campus (No. 66), which is located opposite the cemetery, was established in 2011–2013. It is partly based in a complex of old, industrial buildings which were adapted for their current use by Bertelsen & Scheving Arkitekter.

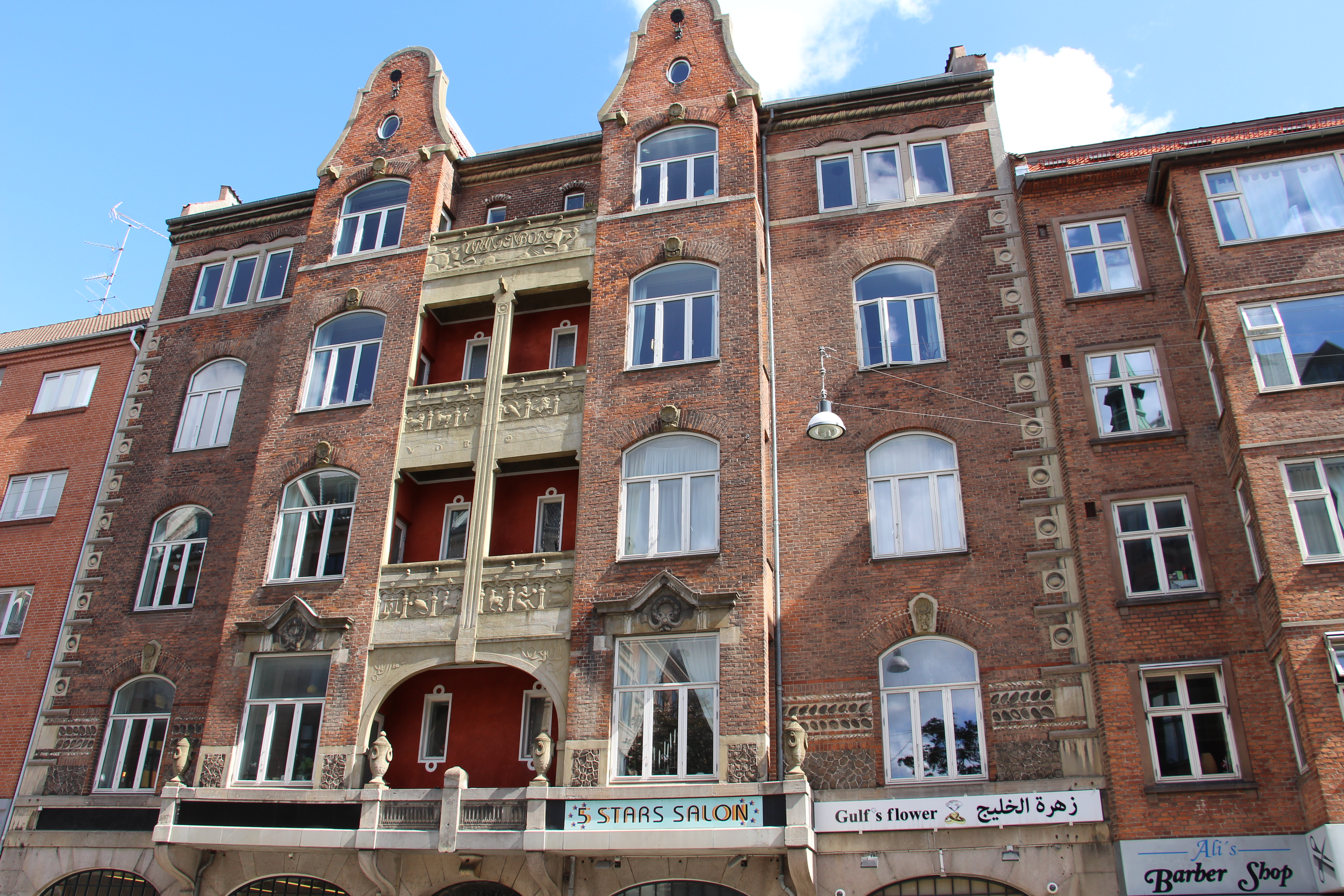
Uranienborg.

The apartment building Uranienborg (No. 168) is from 1902 and was designed by Anton Rosen. The name of the building refers to one of Tycho Brahe's two astronomical observatories Uraniborg on the island of Ven- The facade of the building is decorated with the Zodiac symbols.

Stjerne Apotek (No. 104), a pharmacy, opened in 1906.

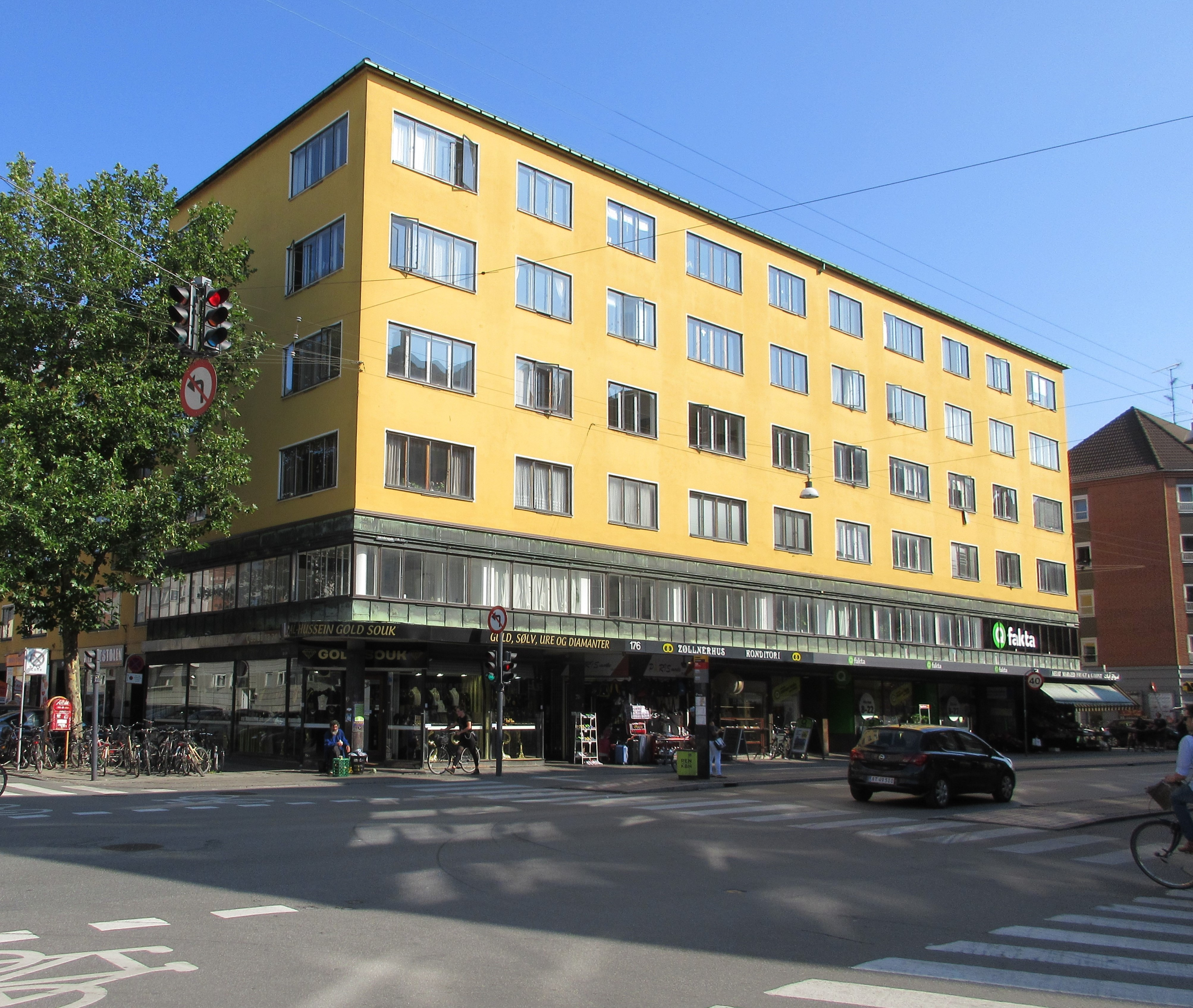
Zøllnerhus.

The Functionalist Zøllnerhus (No. 174-176) is from 1934 to 1936 and was designed by Charles I. Schou and Erik Kragh. It was listed in 2006.

St. Stephen's Church (No. 191) was constructed in 1874 to design by Ludvig Knudsen, It was the second constructed in the Nørrebro area.

No. 198 is the former headquarters of the Danish, machine factory and iron foundry Atlas. The building was designed by Alfred Thomsen. A painted advertisement for Atlas refrigerators is still seen on the gable of No. 200.

Nørrebrohallen (No. 208) is a former carriage house which is now used as a multi-purpose venue.

== Public art, monuments and memorials ==
A gable facing Ravnsborggade features a large mural of a girl on a bicycle. It was painted by the Finnish-Danish painter Seppo Matinens in the 1990s.

Om the wall to Assistens Cemetery is Jørgen Haugen Sørensen's sculpture The Angular Ones support, and the Smooth Ones Slip from 1984. On Aksel Larsens Plads stands Bjørn Nørgaard's sculpture A Farewell To Arms from 2009.

At No. 151A is plaque commemorating that the artist Henry Heerup lived in the building as a child. The commemorative plaque was installed in 2007.

== Transport ==
Nørrebro station at the north end of the street is located on the S-train system's Ring Line. It is also home to one of the stations on the operated City Circle Line of the Copenhagen Metro. Another City Circle Line station is located at Nørrebro Runddel.

Bus line 5C runs through the street.
