= Valdemar Gætje =

Danish master baker and politician (1850–1905)

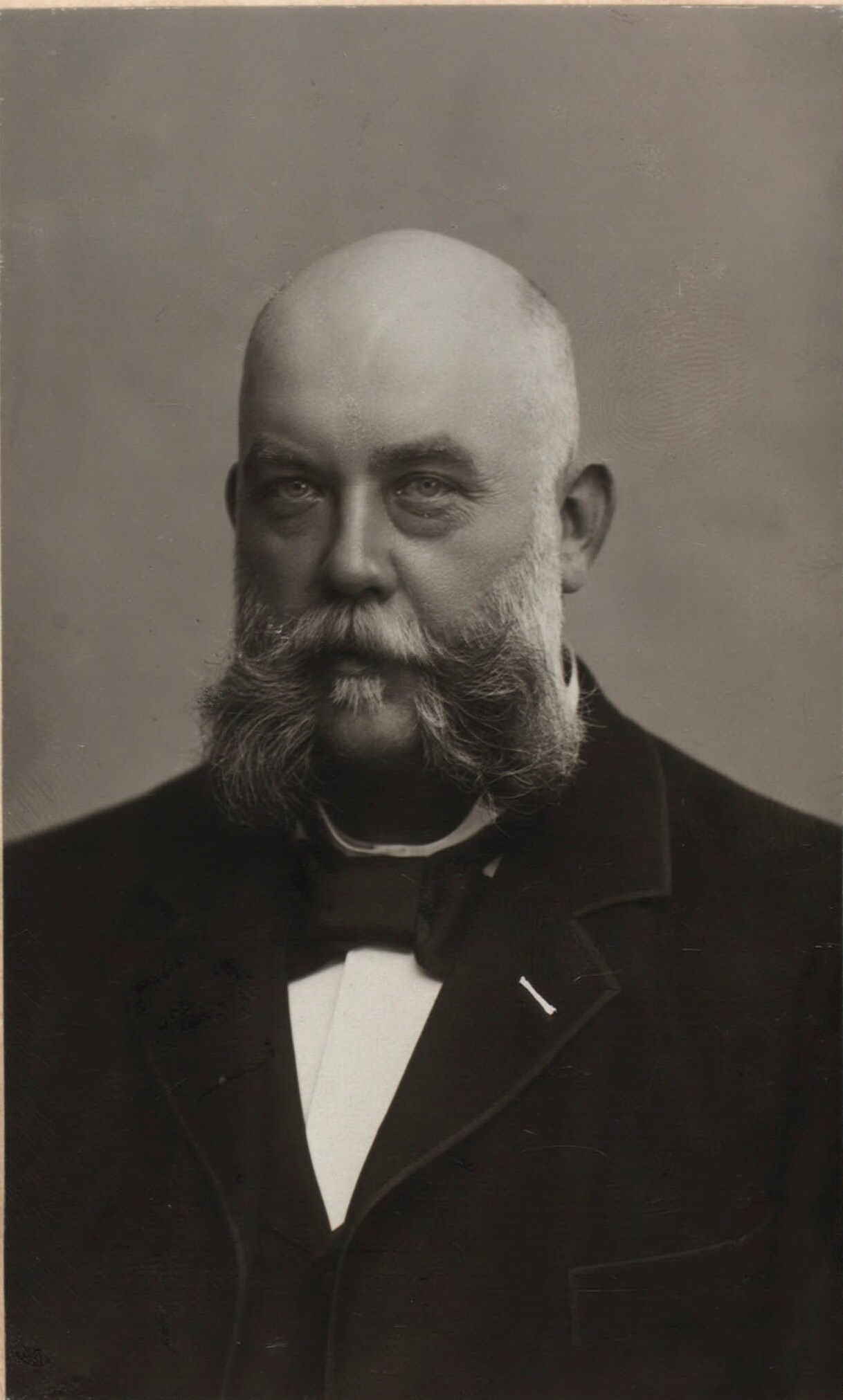
- Born: 10 July 1850; Copenhagen, Denmark
- Died: 13 May 1905 (aged 54); Copenhagen, Denmark
- Citizenship: Danish
- Occupation: Master baker
- Known for: Organisation work

Valdemar Gætje (10 July 1850 - 13 May 1905) was a Danish master baker and the first director of the Union of Danish Employers and Master Cradtsmen. He also played a central role in the foundation of Alderstrøst, a charity providing affordable accommodation for old craftsmen and their widows. He was a member of Copenhagen City Council. His bakery was located at Fælledvej 10 in Nørrebro. The building has been demolished.

== Early life ==
Gætje was born on 10 July 1830 in Copenhagen, the son of master baker Jørgen Ferdinand Gætje (1817–82) and Johanne Henriette Schrøder (1825–75). His father assisted Marie Schlötzer with the management of the bakery at Fælledvej 10 after the death of her husband Frederich Peter Schlötzer in 1836. Gætje's paternal grandfather, Jacob Gætje, a well-to-do tanner, purchased the property from her in 1841. On 26 July 1852, it passed to Gætje's father. Gætje trained as a baker in his father's bakery. He later worked for a couple of years as a baker in Vienna before returning to Copenhagen.

== Career ==
In 1875, Gætje was licensed as a master baker and took over his father's bakery. In 1886, he was elected as alderman of the Bakers' Guild in Copenhagen. He remained in this position until 1903.

== Other activities ==
Gætje was a member of Copenhagen City Council from 1895 to 1901. He served as president of the Association of Craftsmen in Copenhagen. In this capacity, he was strongly involved in the foundation of Alderstræst. He also served as chair of Håndværkerbanken.

In 1899, he was appointed as the first director of the Union of Danish Employers and Master Craftsmen (Dansk arbejdsgiver- og mesterforening, later Dansk Arbejdsgiverforening). He was editor of the union's publication Arbejdsgiveren and frequently contributed articles to it.

== Personal life ==
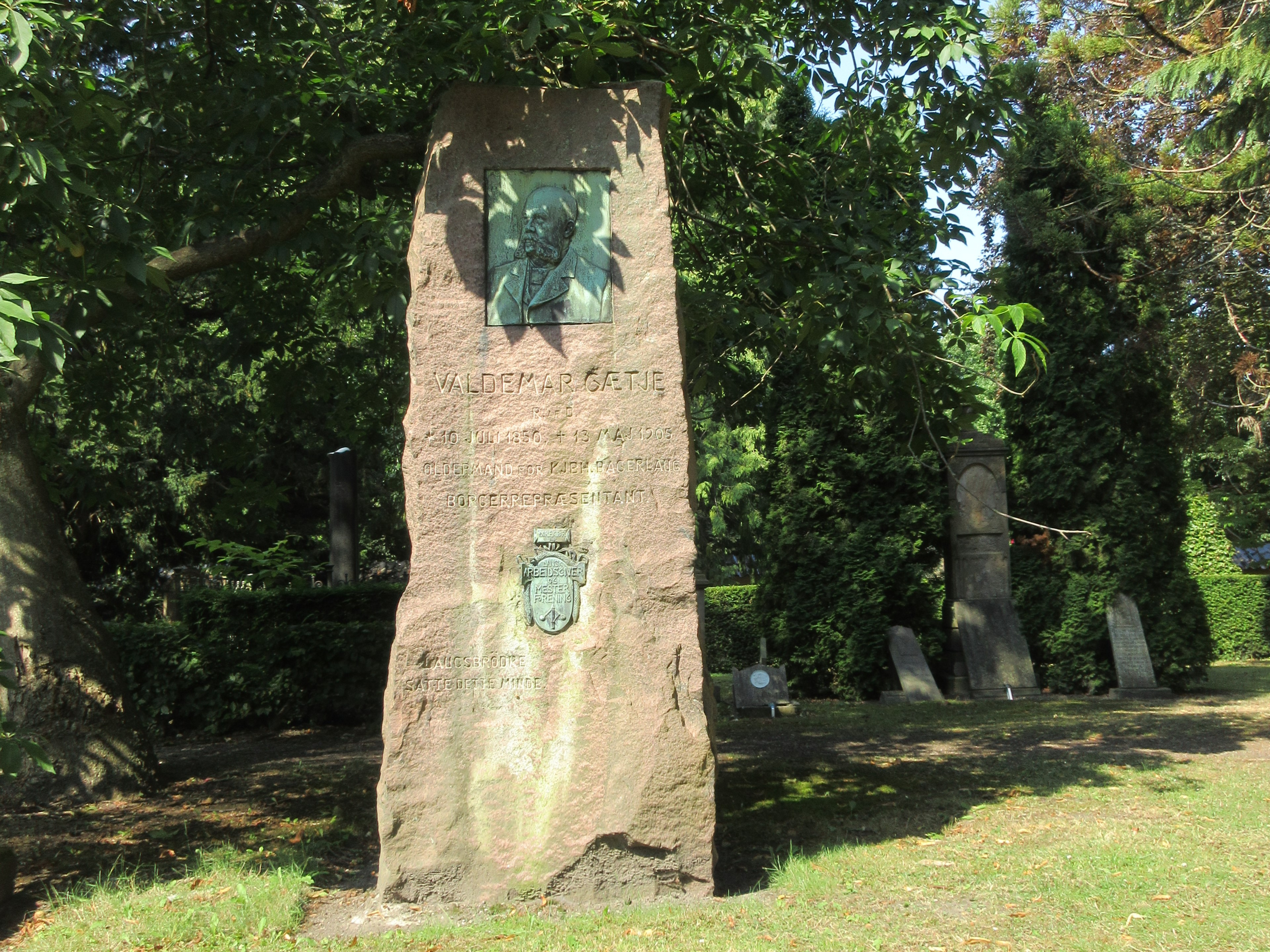
Hætje's tomb in Assistens Cemetery, Copenhagen.

Gætje married on 18 August 1875 in Stettin Louise Ernestine Wilhelmine Jantzen (1856-1923), daughter of master butcher Johann Christian Ludwig Jantzen (1826–95) and Florentine Louise Auguste Fliigge (1834–60). They had no biological children but adopted a girl, Kate Zuelzer.

He was created a Knight in the Order of the Dannebrog in 1892. He died on 13 May 1905 and is buried in Assistens Cemetery. The headstone features a relief portrait of him.

Louise Gætje continued the family's bakery after her husband's death. She had already prior to his death been strongly engaged in its management as he got still more involved in organisation work. The bakery was after her own death continued by their foster daughter Kate Zuelzer.
