= Bragesgade =

Street in Copenhagen Municipality, Denmark

- Length: 350 m (1,150 ft)
- Location: Copenhagen, Denmark
- Quarter: Nørrebro
- Postal code: 2200
- Nearest metro station: Nørrebro station
- Coordinates: 55°41′59.06″N 12°32′38.65″E
- Southwest end: Nørrebrogade
- Northeast end: Nannasgade

Bragesgade is a street in the Outer Nørrebro district of Copenhagen, Denmark. It runs from Nørrebrogade in the southwest to Nannasgade in the northeast. It is located in the so-called Mimersgade Quarter where many of the streets are named after Norse figures and localities. It is named after Brage (Bragi). Nørrebrohallen's main entrance is located in the street.

== History ==
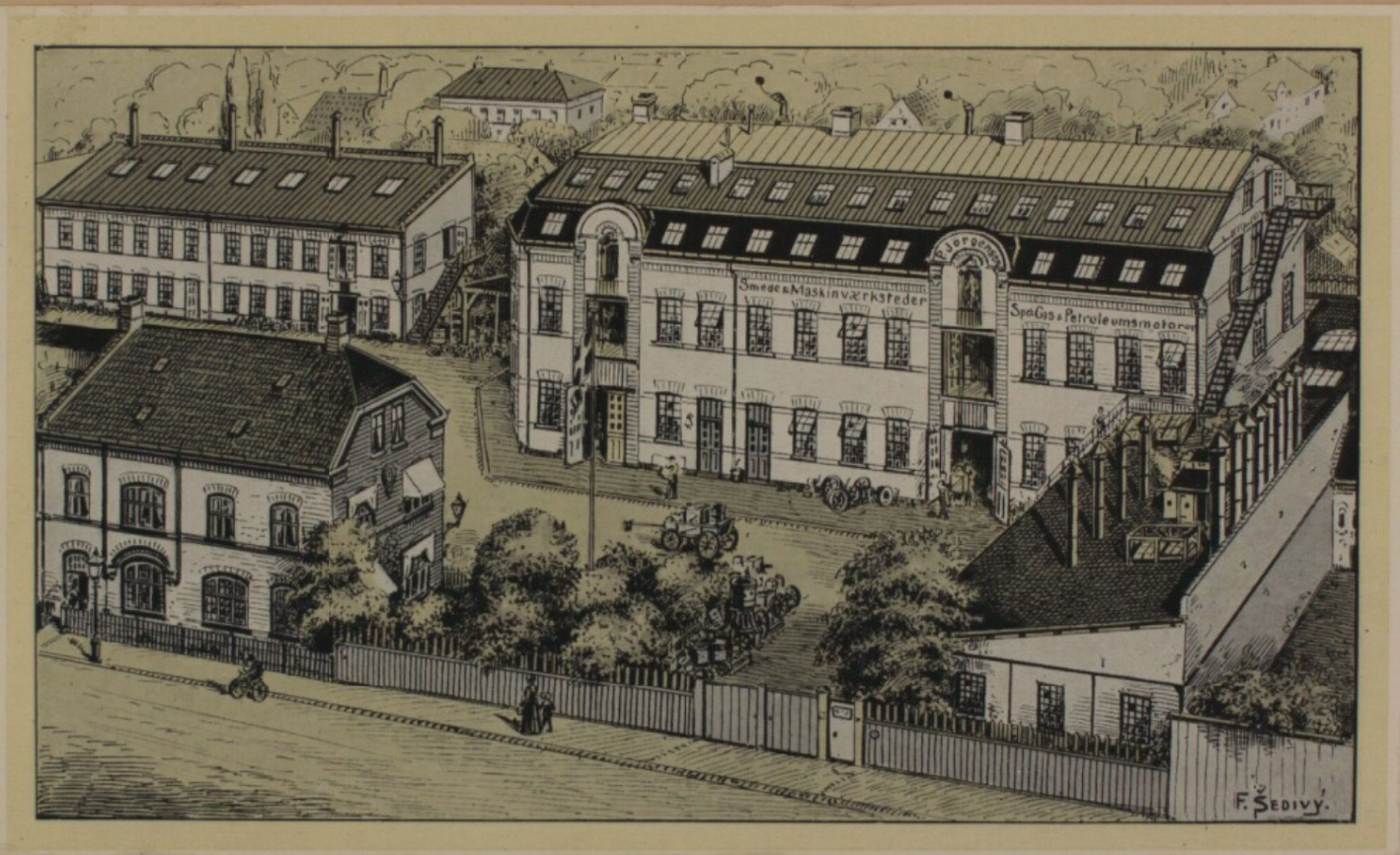
P. Jørgensens "Dan" Motorfabriker

The street was given its name in 1889. It then ended at Rosagade (now Mimersgade) but it was later extended to Nannasgade.

A complex of carriagehouses and workshops for the trams was constructed on the northwest side of the street in1898. It was later extended several times, for instance with its own substation in 1914.

Several industrial enterprises were also built in the street. Brdr. Henzes Skrueboltefabrik was located at No. 8 but moved when a new plant on Strandlodsvej in Amager was inaugurated in the 1940s. Peter Jørgensens motorfabrik "Dan", the first Danish manufacturer of petroleum engines, opened at No. 10 in around 1910. It relocated to Herlev in 1953.

== Notable Buildings and places ==
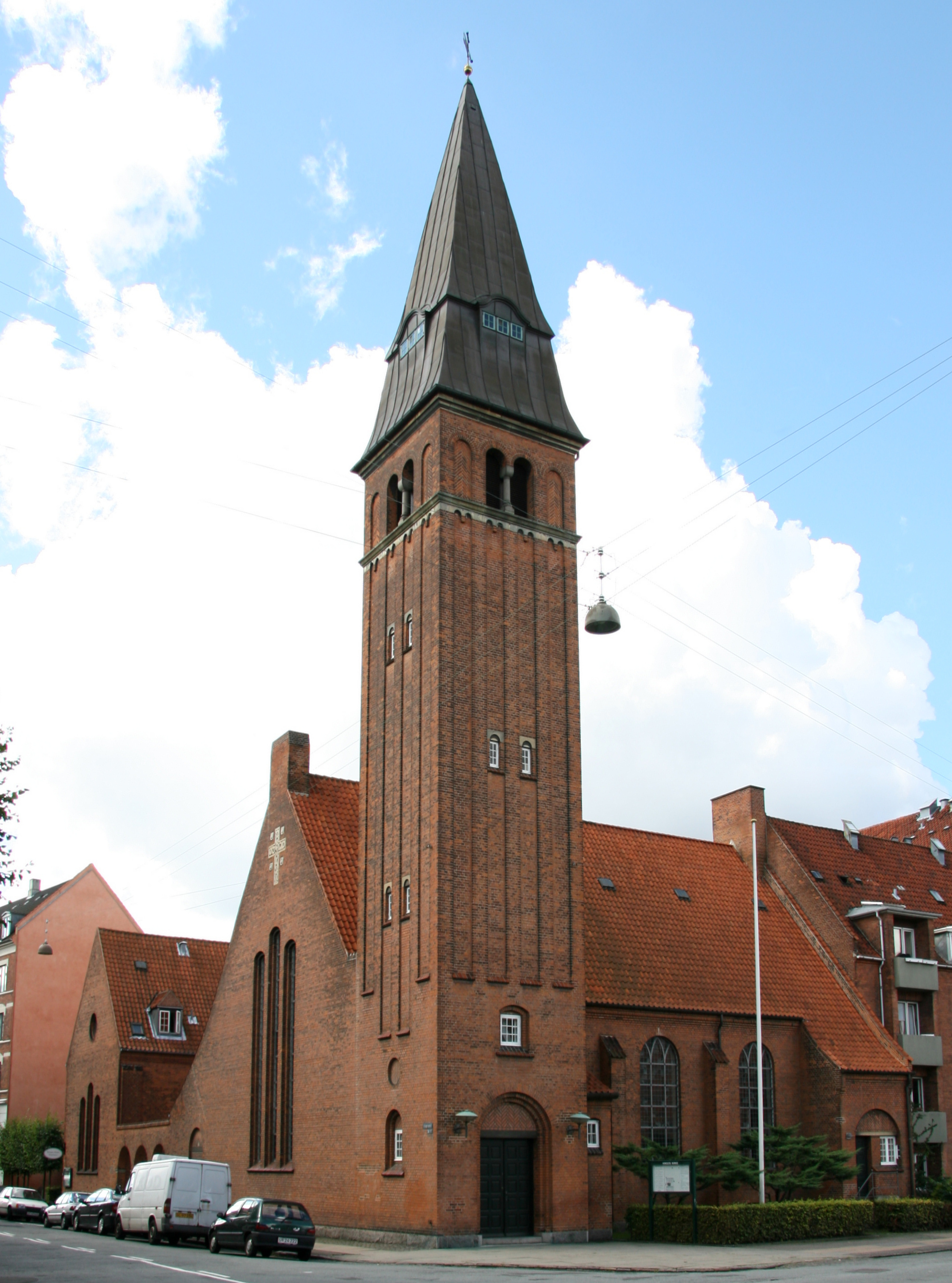
Kingo's Church

Nørrebrohallen, located in the former remisse complex, is operated as a local culture and sports centre. The main building from 1898 was extended on a number of occasions, for instance in 1902 by Vilhelm Friederichsen.

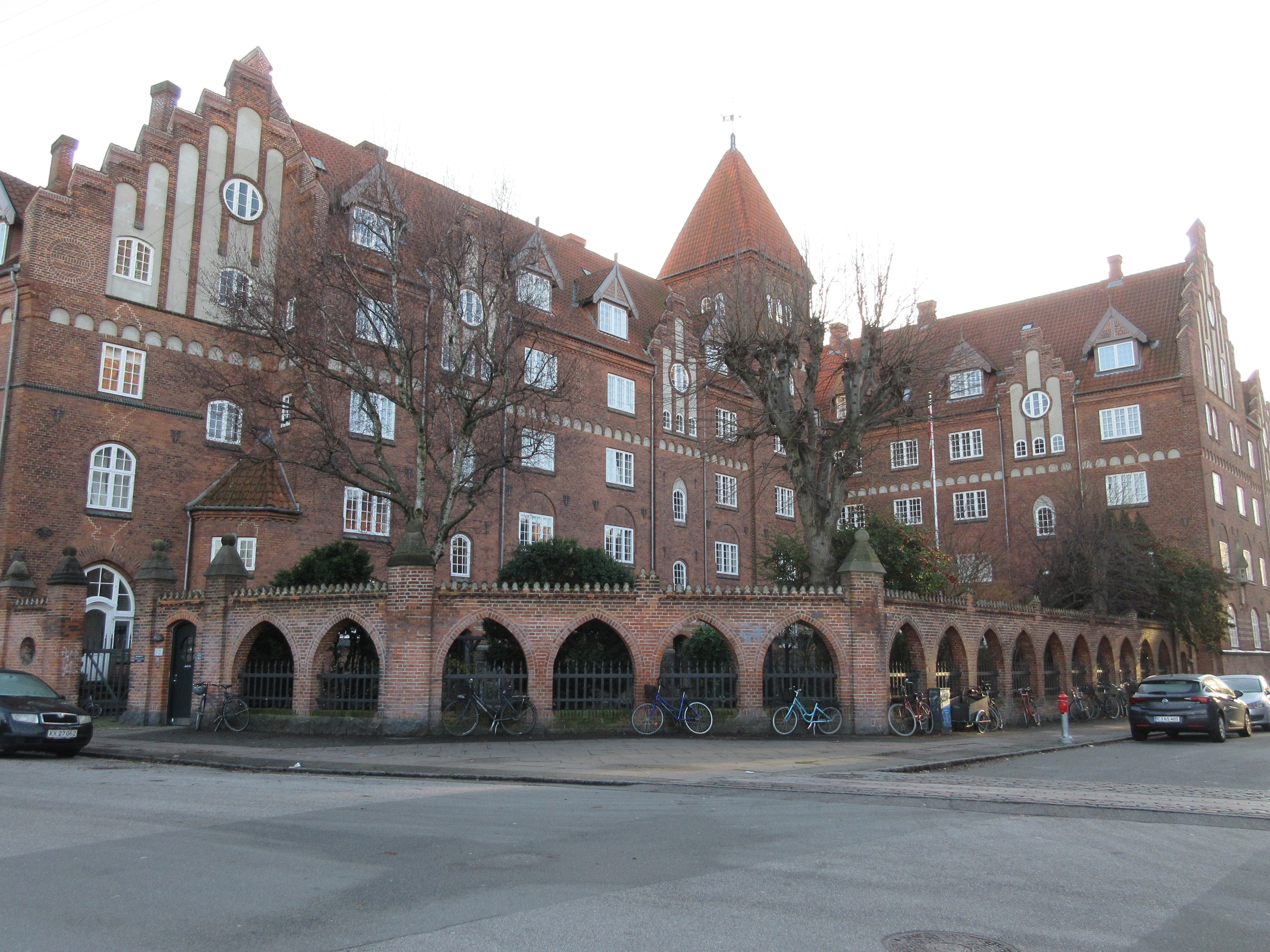
Manufakturhandlerforeningens stiftelse

Kingo's Church (No. 25), on the corner with Nannasgade, was built in 1910. The National Romantic building was designed by Kristoffer Varming.

Manufakturhandlerforeningens Stiftelse (No. 26A), located opposite Kingo's Church, was also built in 1909. The building was designed by Valdemar and Bernhard Ingemann.

== Transport ==
The southwestern end of the street is located approximately 430 metres from Nørrebro station and some 600 metres from Nørrebrosrunddel. The northeastern end of the street is located approximately 340 metres from Skjolds Plads.

== See also ==
- Thorsgade
