= Fælledvej =

Street in Copenhagen, Denmark

Coordinates: 55.6894°N 12.5603°E

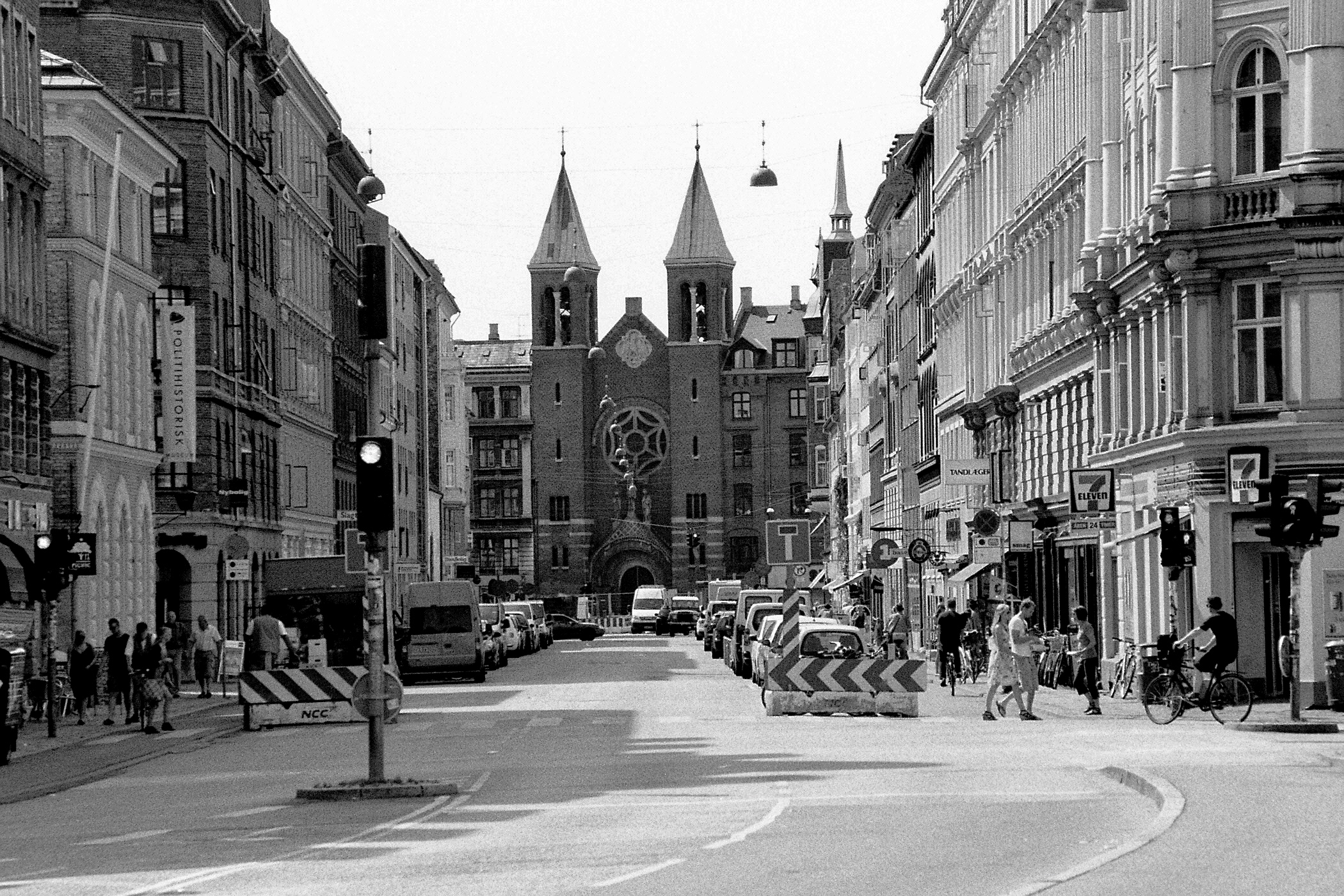
Fælledvej.

Fælledvej (lit. 'Common Road') is a street in the Nørrebro district of Copenhagen, Denmark. It links the major shopping street Nørrebrogade in the west with the square Sankt Hans Torv in the east.

== History ==
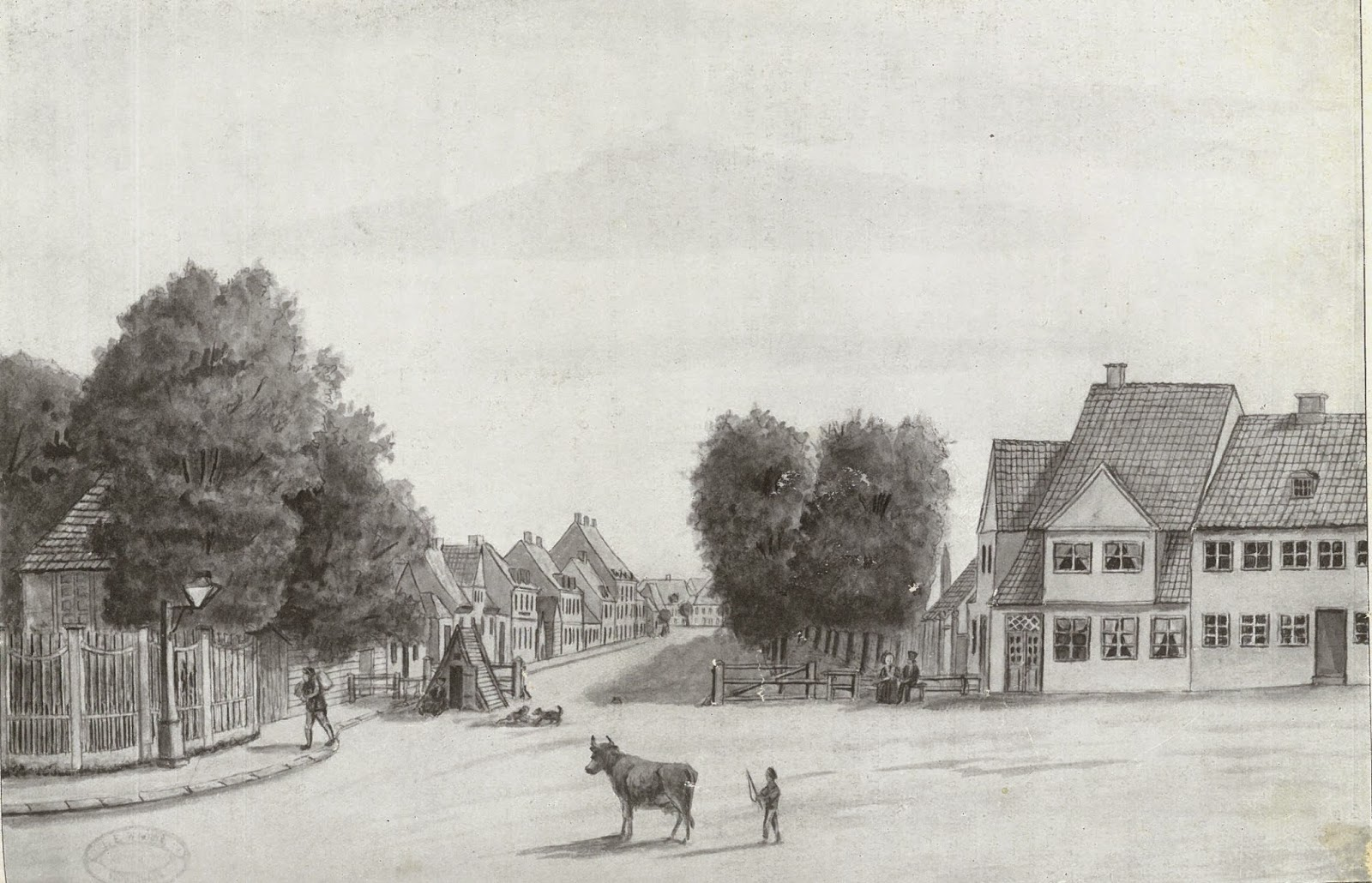
Fælledvej in c. 1830

Fælledvej takes its name after the common Blegdam Fælled. Blegdam Fælled was in turn named after the bleaching ponds at Blegdamsvej, Fælledvej's continuation. The street was originally a short track linking the main road in and out of Copenhagen's North Gate (Nørreport) with a milking station located where Sankt Hans Torv is today.

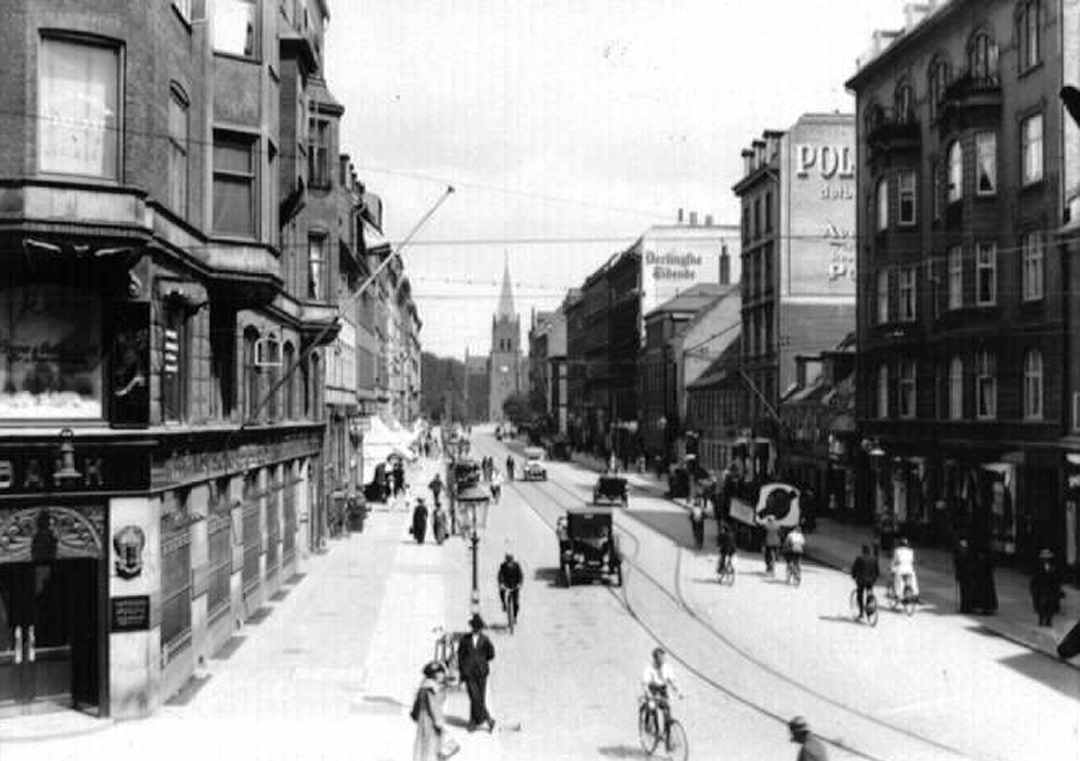
Fælledvej with St. Johns Church in the background

The road was gradually built over with larger buildings when the so-called Demarcation Line was moved to The Lakes in 1752.

Fælledvej Police Station, or Station 6, opened on 21 October 1884. It maintained a staff of 64 policemen: One chief police officer, four superior police officers, 11 inspectors and 46 ordinary policemen. The top floor contained a residence for the head of the police station. First floor contained accommodation for 16 unmarried policemen. The police station closed on 25 May 1977.

A bakery was for many years located at Fælledvej 10 (then Nørrebro No. 40). It was for several generations owned by the from the 1840s owned by Jørgen Ferdinand Gætje and later by his son Valdemar Gætje from 1875 until 1905.

== Notable buildings and residents ==
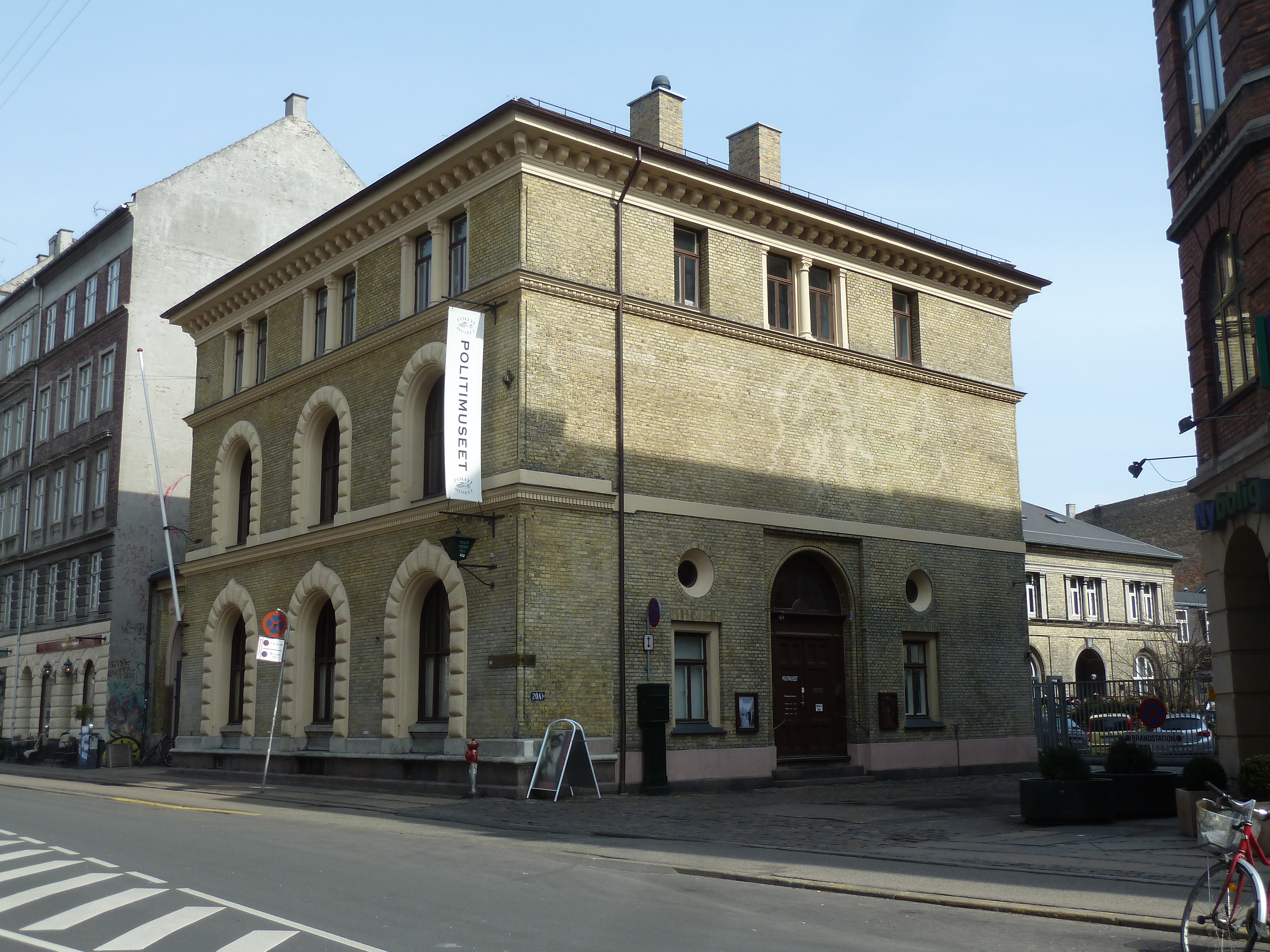
No. 20: The Danish Police Museum

No. 4 contains a series of murals by Storm P. in a building from 1921. They were created for the restaurant venue Patricia in June 1922 and consists of 20 episodes with the character Peter Vimmelskaft as the central figure. The complex was adapted for use by the industrial enterprise Det danske skriftstøberi in the 1930s and the murals were forgotten but rediscovered when the company moved out in 1950. The building with the murals was Listed in 1981.

The former police station (No. 20) now house the Danish Police Museum. The Historicist building was designed by Hans Jørgen Holm.

== Commemorative plaque ==
The facade of No. 4 features a plaque commemorating the Swedish soldiers that were killed at Copenhagen's North Rampart (Nørrevold) on 11 February 1658 in the Assault on Copenhagen.
