= Mimersgade =

Street in Copenhagen, Denmark

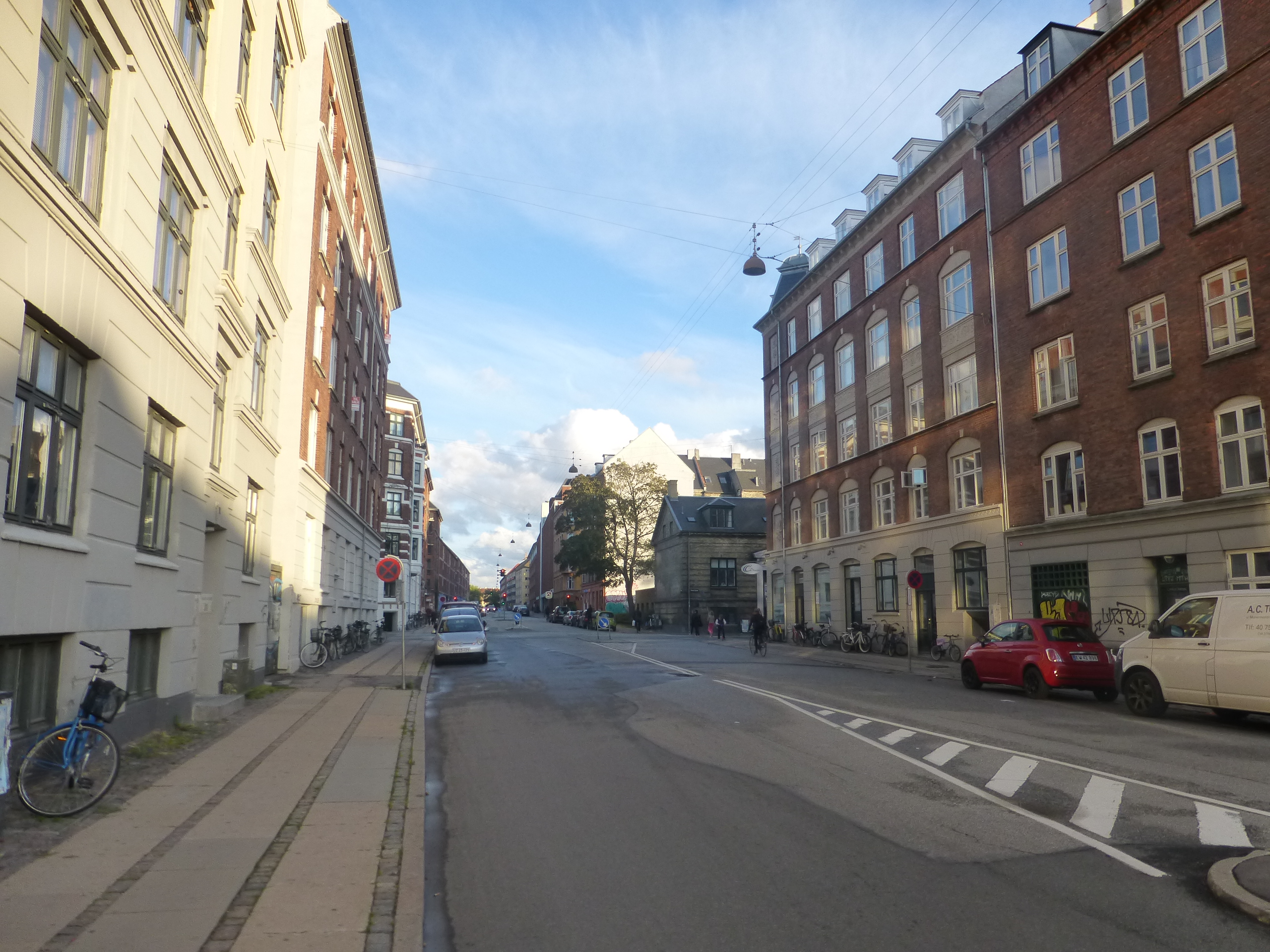
- Interactive map of Mimersgade
- Length: 1,010 m (3,310 ft)
- Location: Copenhagen, Denmark
- Quarter: Nørrebro
- Postal code: 2200
- Nearest metro station: Nørrebro station
- Coordinates: 55°41′57.9″N 12°32′51.3″E
- Southeast end: Jagtvej
- Major junctions: Superkilen
- Northwest end: Nørrebrogade

Mimersgade is a street in the Nørrebro district of Copenhagen, Denmark. It runs from Jagtvej in the southeast to Nørrebrogade at Nørrebro station in the northwest. The street is bisected by Superkilen, a strip park created in the grounds of a former railway. The surrounding neighbourhood is known as the Milnersgade Quarter. Most of the streets in the neighbourhood are named with inspiration from Norse mythology. Mimersgade takes its name from Mímir, the Jötunn who garden the Well of Visdom.

== History ==
Milnersgade follows the boundary between Kløvermarken (not to be confused with Kløvermarken on Amager and Rådmandsmarken. The area was from 1864 crossed by the North Line. The course of the street is visible on a map from 1865. The section east of the railway was originally called Rosegade while the section to the west of the railway was called Slejpnersgade.

Rosagade and Slejpnersgade were connected when the North Line closed in 1930. The two streets were renamed in 1925 and 1931.

== Buildings ==
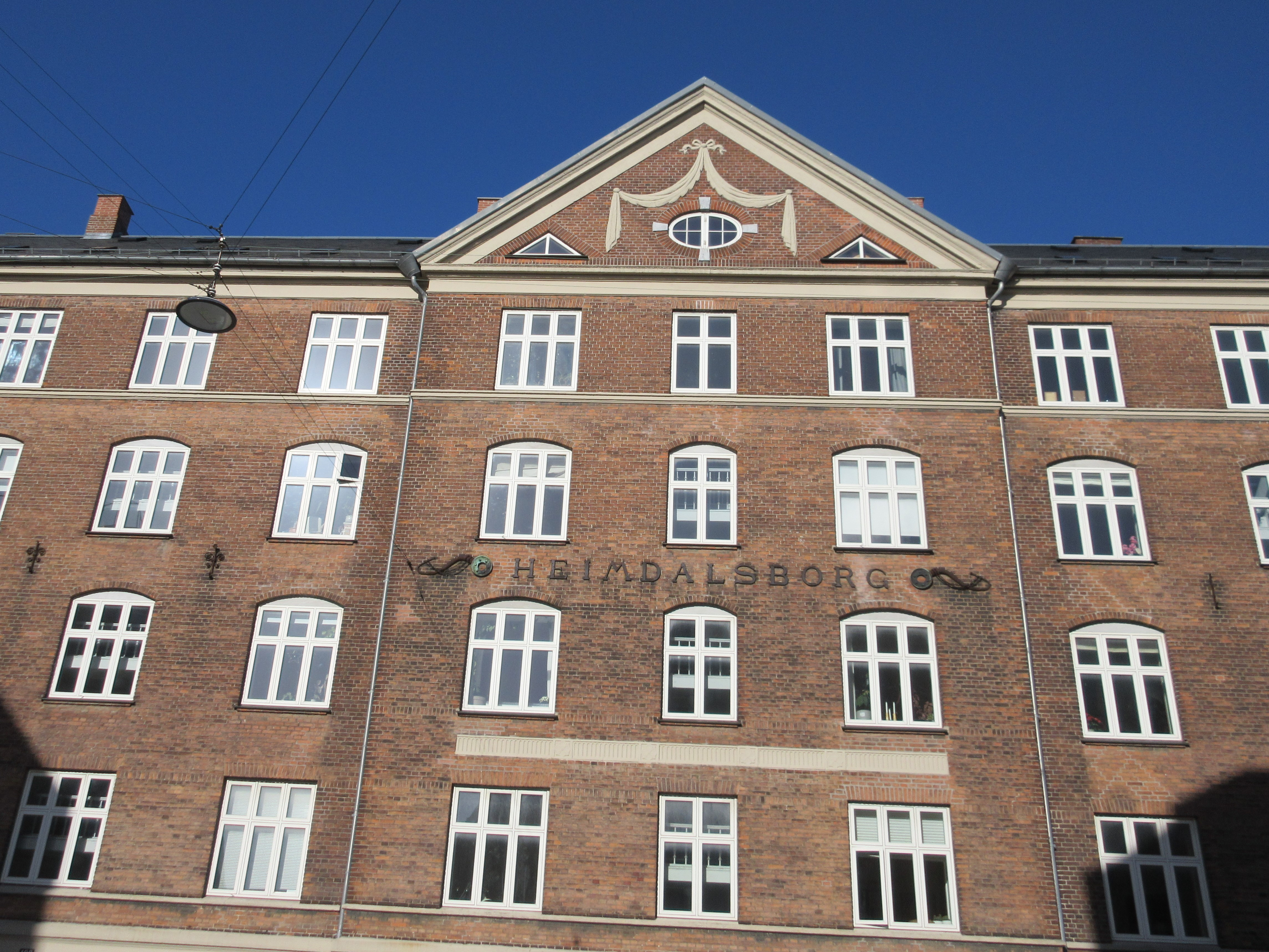
Heimdalsborg

The street passes Nørrebrohallen and Rådmandsgade School. Forbundshuset (No. 47) is from 1972, and was designed by Ole Buhl. Magistrenes A-kasse and a branch of Arbejdernes Landsbank are based in the building.

== See also ==
- Sjællandsgade
