= Superkilen =

Public park in Copenhagen, Denmark

Coordinates: 55°42′00″N 12°32′45″E

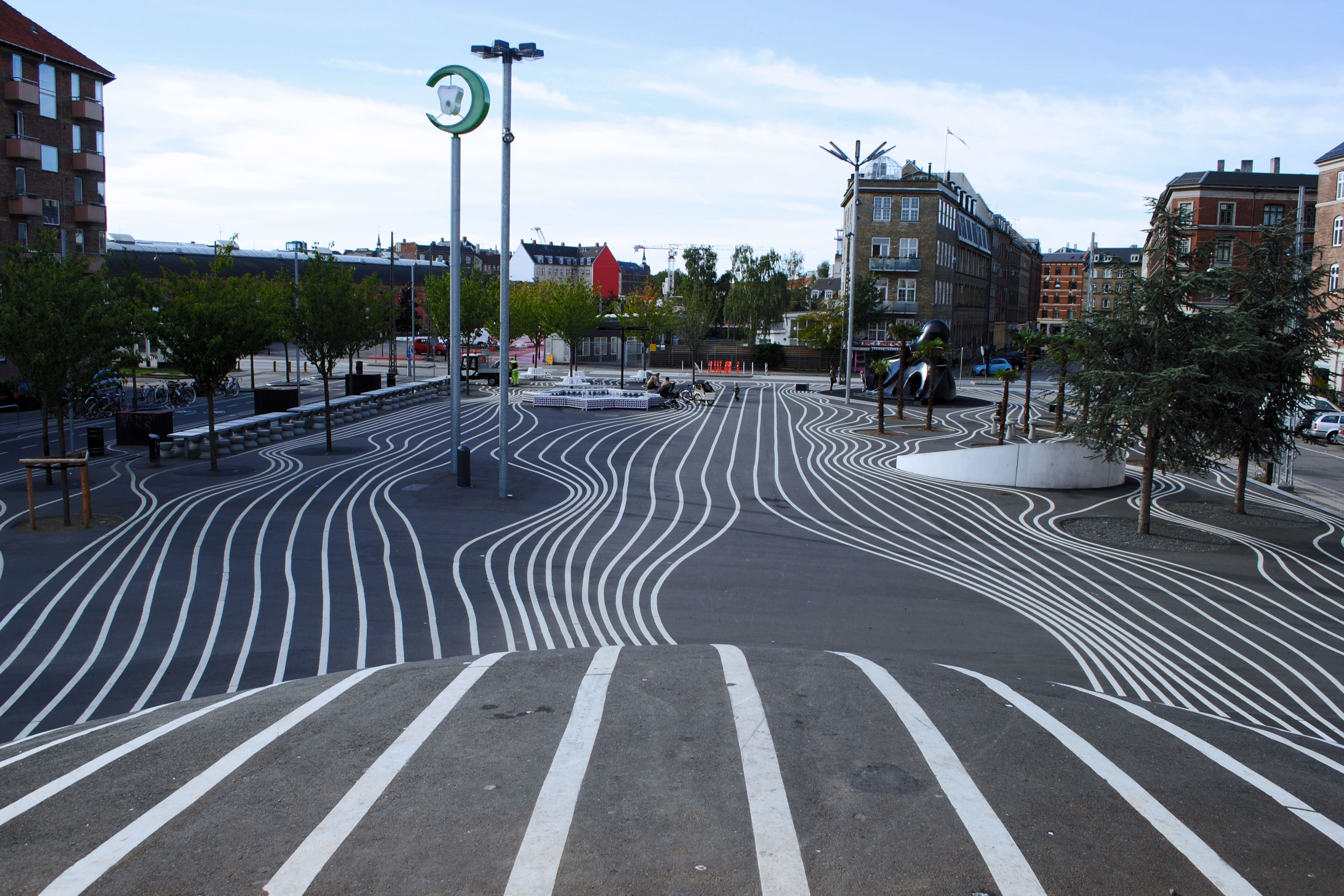
Superkilen, Nørrebro, Copenhagen

Superkilen is a public park in the Nørrebro district of Copenhagen, Denmark. The park is designed to bring immigrants and locals together, promoting tolerance and unity in one of Denmark's most ethnically-diverse and socially-challenged communities. Not only is the park a meeting place for local residents, it is a tourist attraction for Copenhagen. Designed by the arts group Superflex with the collaboration of Bjarke Ingels Group and Topotek1, a German landscape architecture firm, the park was officially opened in June 2012. The almost kilometre-long park's name refers to its shape, "kilen" meaning "wedge".

== Background ==
The park is part of an urban improvement plan coordinated by the City of Copenhagen in a partnership with Realdania, a private philanthropic organization. The objective was to upgrade the Nørrebro neighbourhood to a high standard of urban development liable to inspire other cities and districts. It is designed as a kind of world exposition for the local inhabitants, covering over 60 nationalities, who have been able to contribute their own ideas and artefacts to the project.

Nørrebro is a neighbourhood plagued by crime and areas to the East and West of the park's location were cut off from the rest of the city by two major highways. It was also the site of riots in 2006 triggered by a controversial cartoon depicting the Muslim prophet Muhammad. The Copenhagen-based architects experienced the vandalism and violence of these riots in the streets outside their office, just after designing a downtown mosque, and decided to focus on creating urban spaces to promote integration across ethnicity, religion, culture, and languages.

The designers see the park as not a finite project but an "artwork in progress." The design is based on dreams that could transform into objects and is meant to make people of diverse backgrounds feel at home. It uses humour to represent the different cultures in a respectful manner.

Commissioned in June 2008, the design process lasted from January 2009 until February 2010, with construction between August 2010 and June 2012. The project cost US$8,879,000.

== Awards and recognition ==
The project was rewarded with a 2013 AIA Honor Award in the Regional & Urban Design category by the American Institute of Architects. It was shortlisted for Design of the Year by the Design Museum in London as well as for the European Union Prize for Contemporary Architecture. Superkilen was also one of six winners of the 2016 Aga Khan Award for Architecture recognized for promoting integration of the various religious and ethnic groups living in the area despite tensions between immigrant and host populations, with a mix of humour, history, and hubris.

Various tourist platforms list the park as one of Copenhagen's top ten must-visit sites. Many advertisements have used the park as a background.

== Features ==
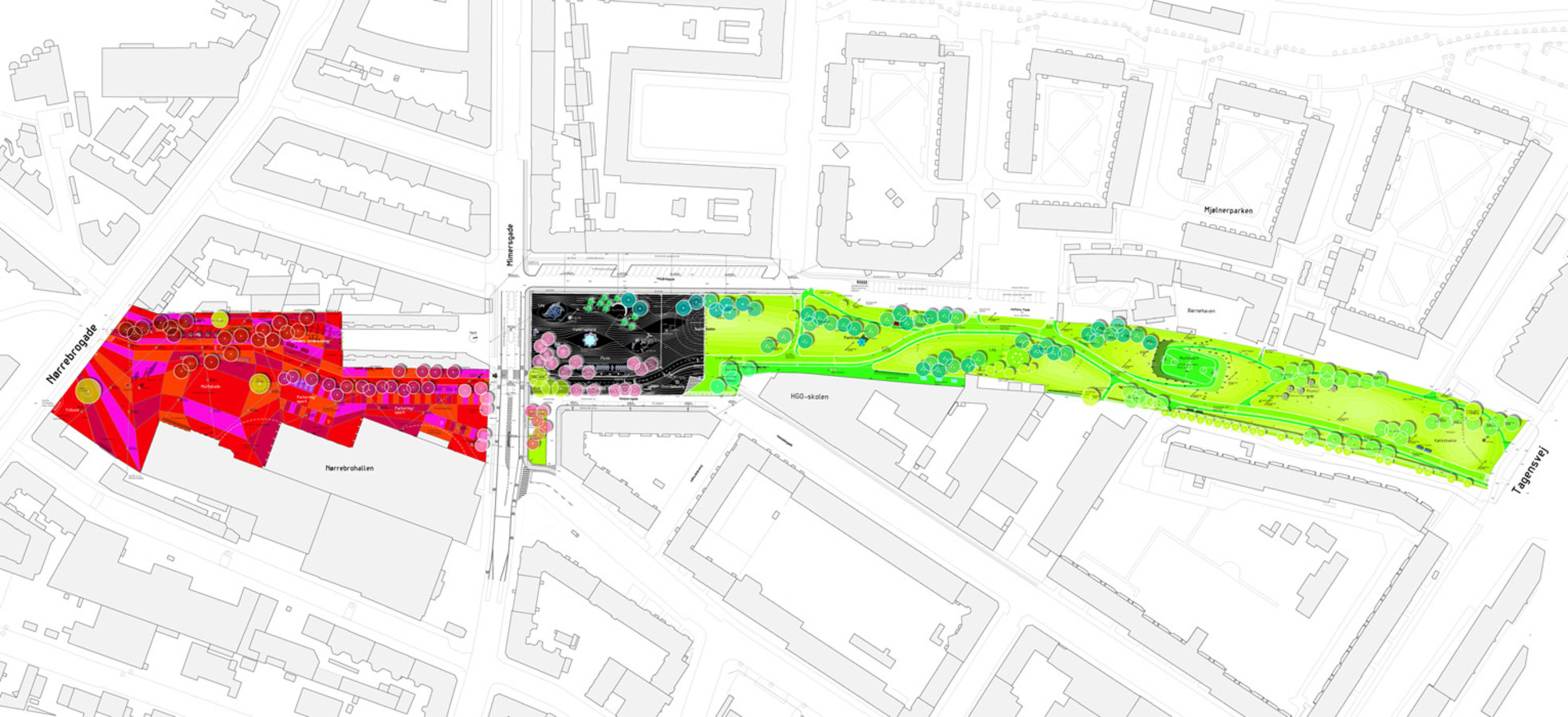
Plan

Stretching some 750 metres (2,460 ft) along either side of a public cycle track and covering a total area of some 30,000 square metres (320,000 sq ft), Superkilen is made up of three main areas: a red square, a black market and a green park. While the red square, painted bright red, orange and pink, focuses on recreation and modern living, the black market at the centre is the classic square with a fountain where neighbours can meet, with its barbecue grills and palm trees from China, an "urban living room". The green park, literally entirely green, has rolling hills, trees and plants suitable for picnics, sports and dog-walking.

Many of the objects in the park have been specially imported or copied from foreign designs. They include swings from Iraq, benches from Brazil, a Soviet bus stop, a fountain from Morocco and litter bins from England. There are neon signs from throughout the world advertising everything from a Russian hotel to a Chinese beauty parlour. Even the manhole covers come from various locations such as Zanzibar and Poland. In all, there are 108 plants and artefacts illustrating the ethnic diversity of the local population, whose backgrounds touch 62 different countries. These objects help symbolize residents' shared ownership of the park.

A plate on the ground next to each item describes it in Danish and the language of its home country, and visitors can download an app to learn more about each object.

== Social impact ==
Superkilen has succeeded in joining two residential areas formerly divided by a fence and has reconnected the surrounding areas to the rest of the city. Pedestrian and cycling traffic has increased between two major roads and the park encourages people to become more active. It provides a stimulating environment, particularly important for children.

The park acts as a meeting place for residents of Denmark's most ethnically-diverse neighbourhood and attracts visitors from across the city and around the world. It has rejuvenated the problematic area and brought together the sixty different nationalities living nearby. In addition to the wide range of ethnicities using the park, it attracts a wide range of ages, from small children with their parents to elderly people.

Although the area has a history of vandalism, this has not been a huge issue in the park. Lighting in the area helps create a sense of security for residents. Some area residents were initially concerned that it would not be a traditional green park, but are generally pleased with gaining a meeting place and the park's high level of activity, and are proud of their neighbourhood park. Adding green space to the neighbourhood has aided water management.

== Design process ==
Instead of designing the park with traditional public outreach catering to political correctness and preconceived ideas, the architects used extreme public participation to drive the park's design. They reached out to residents using internet, email, newspapers, and radio. The public consultation process was extensive, gathering suggestions from area residents for objects the park could contain to represent all sixty nationalities, then a local governance board selected the objects. Diversity was less a problem requiring a solution than a useful tool in the creative process of creating the park's identity.

== Gallery ==
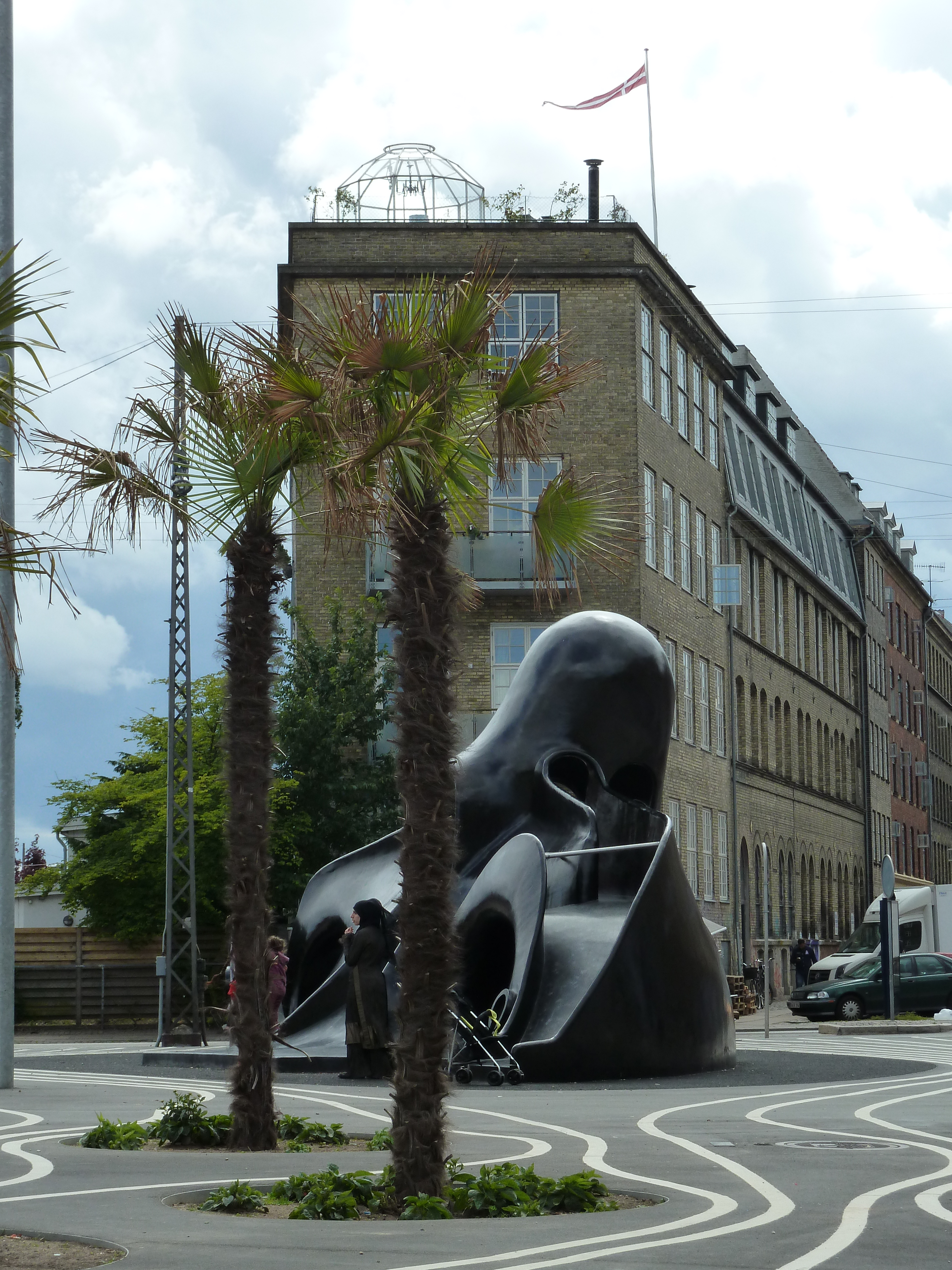
Palm trees

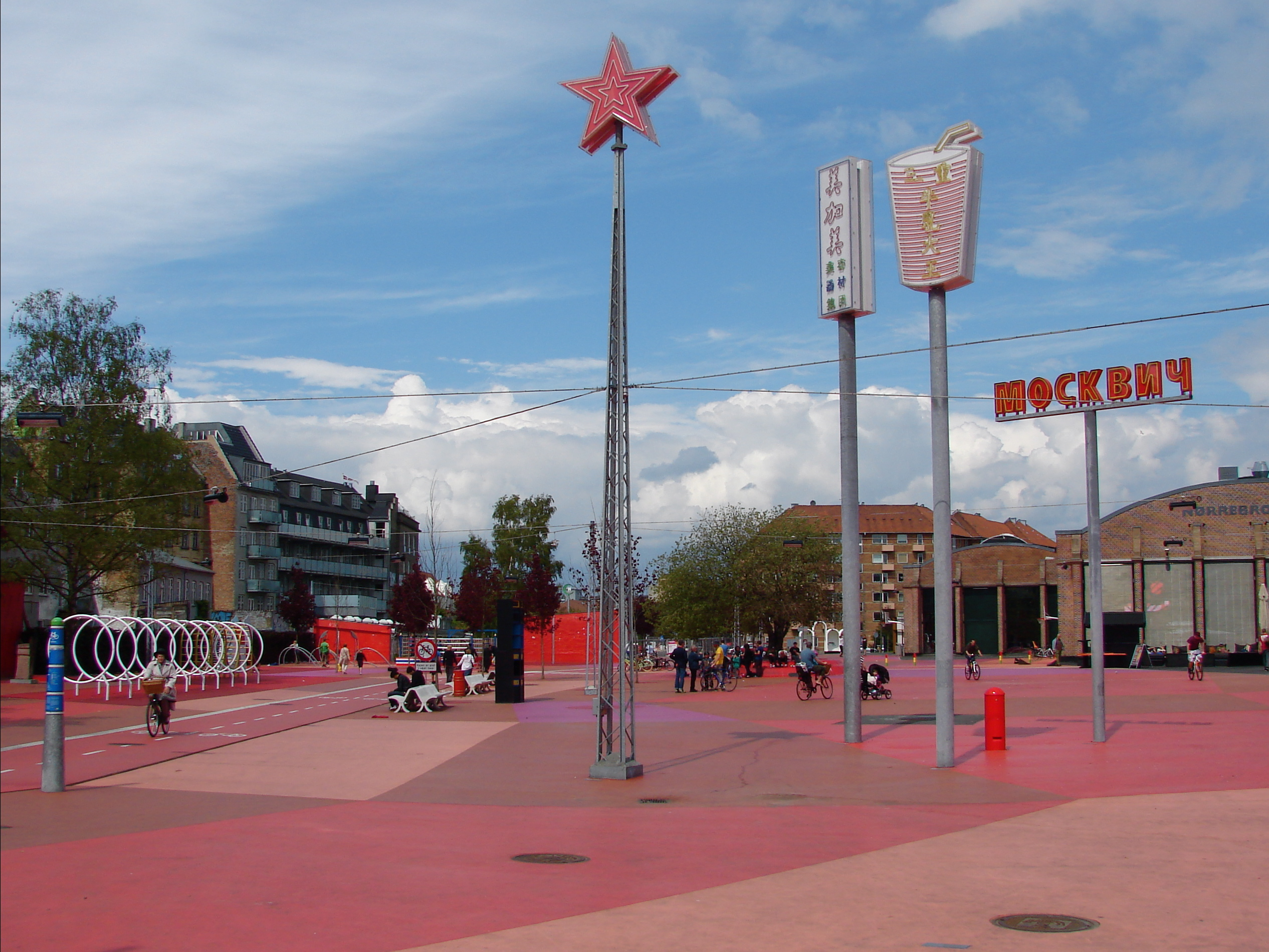
Red area cycle track

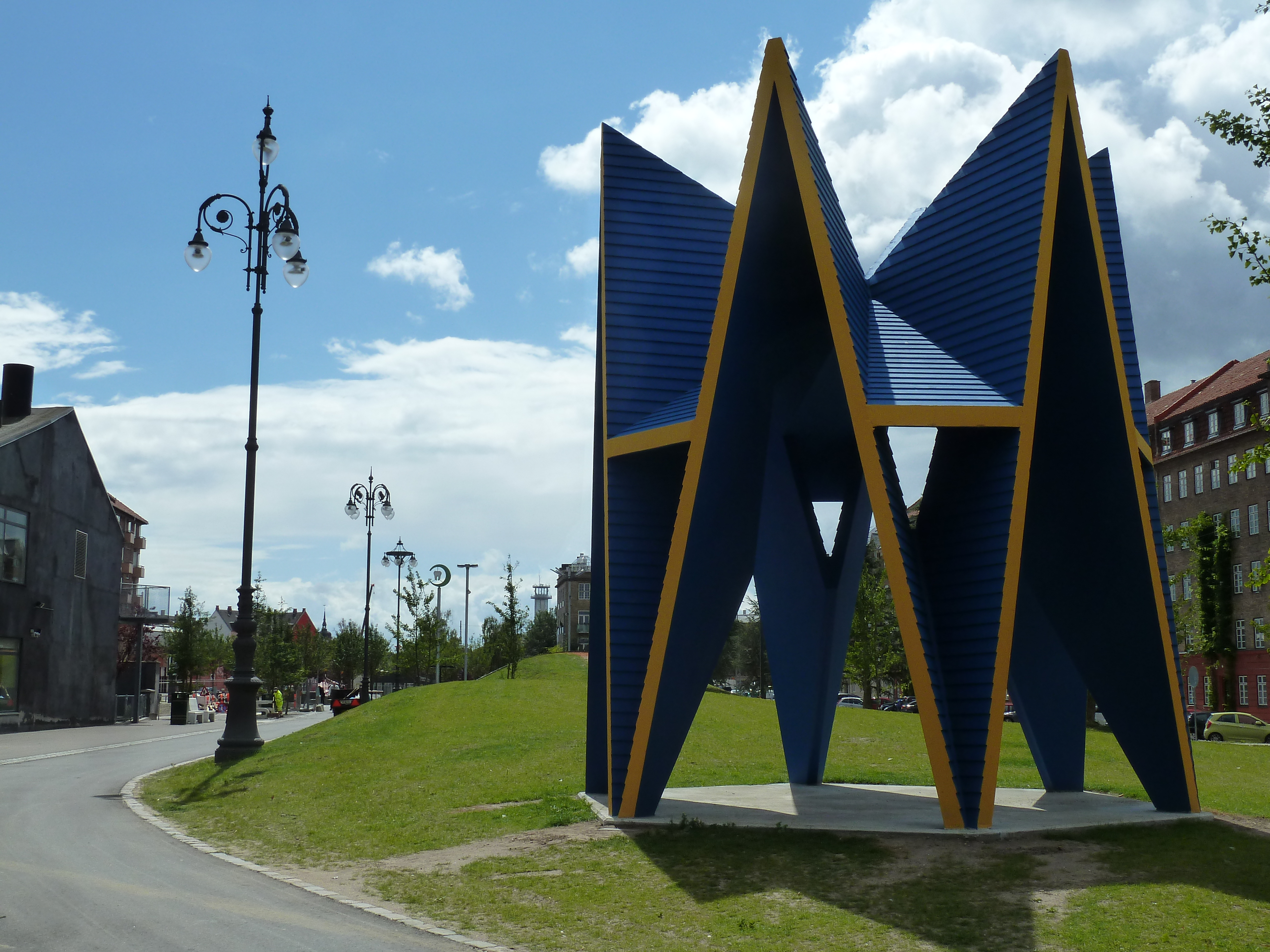
Russian pavilion

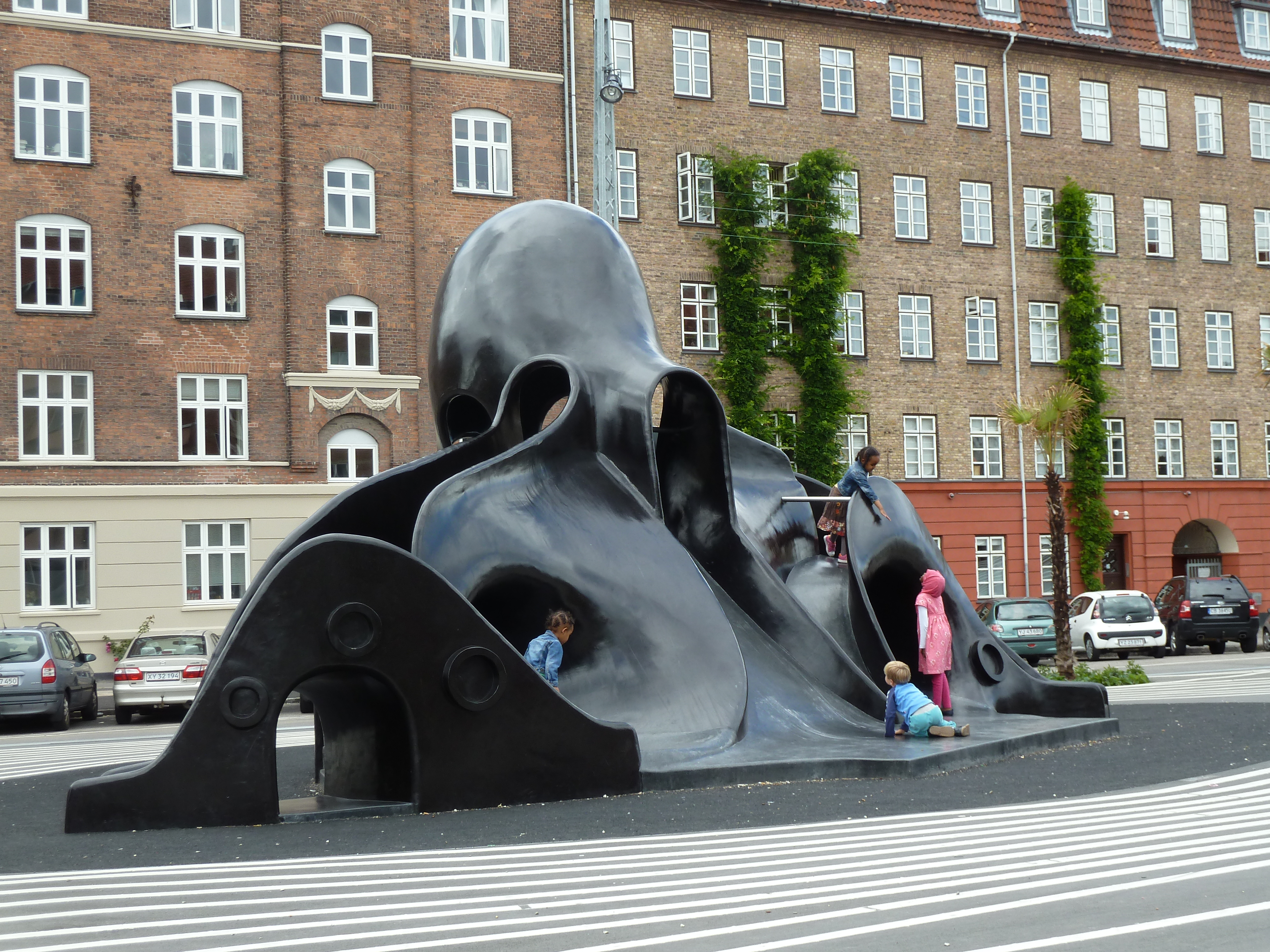
Japanese octopus

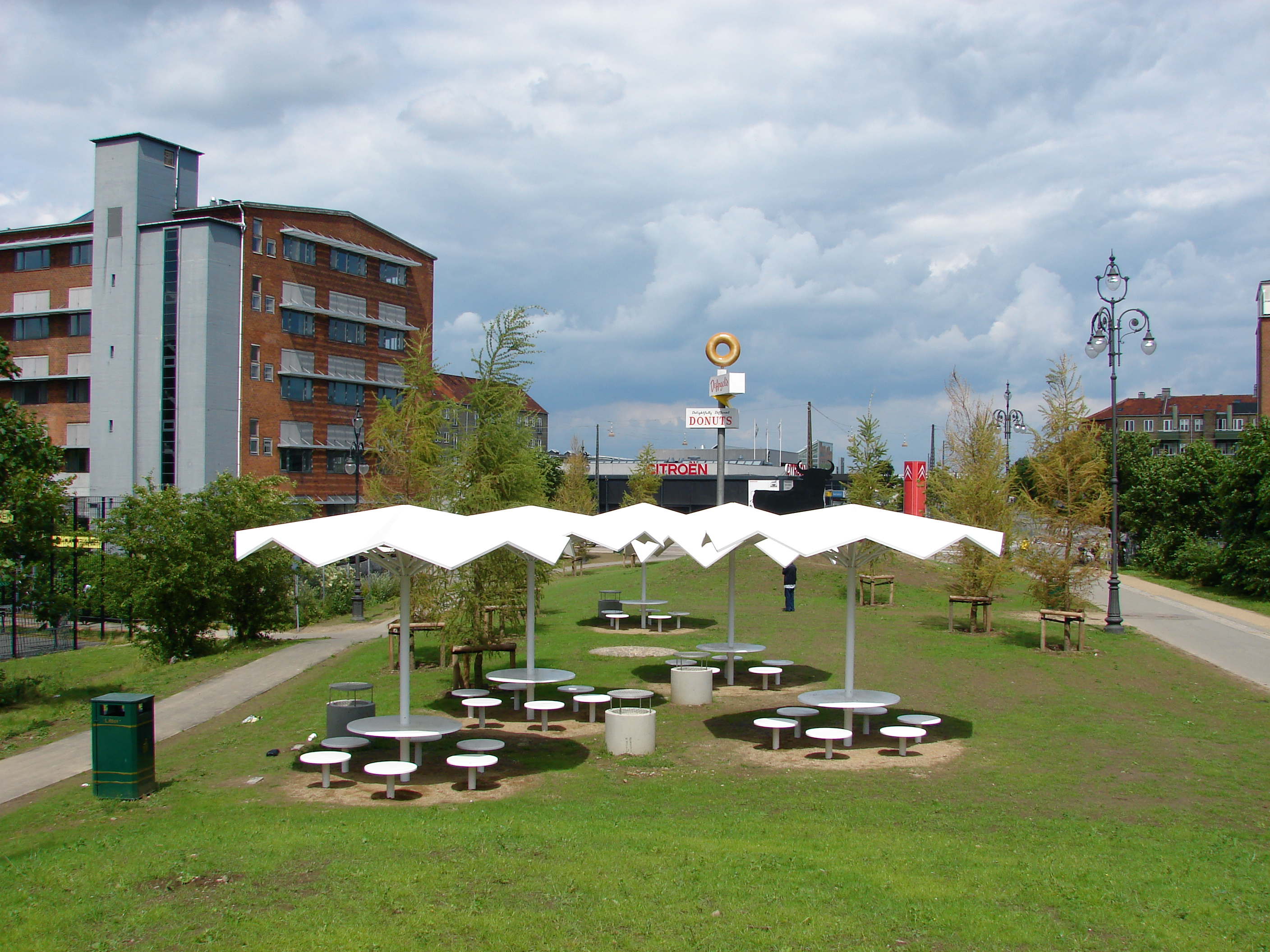
Armenian picnic tables

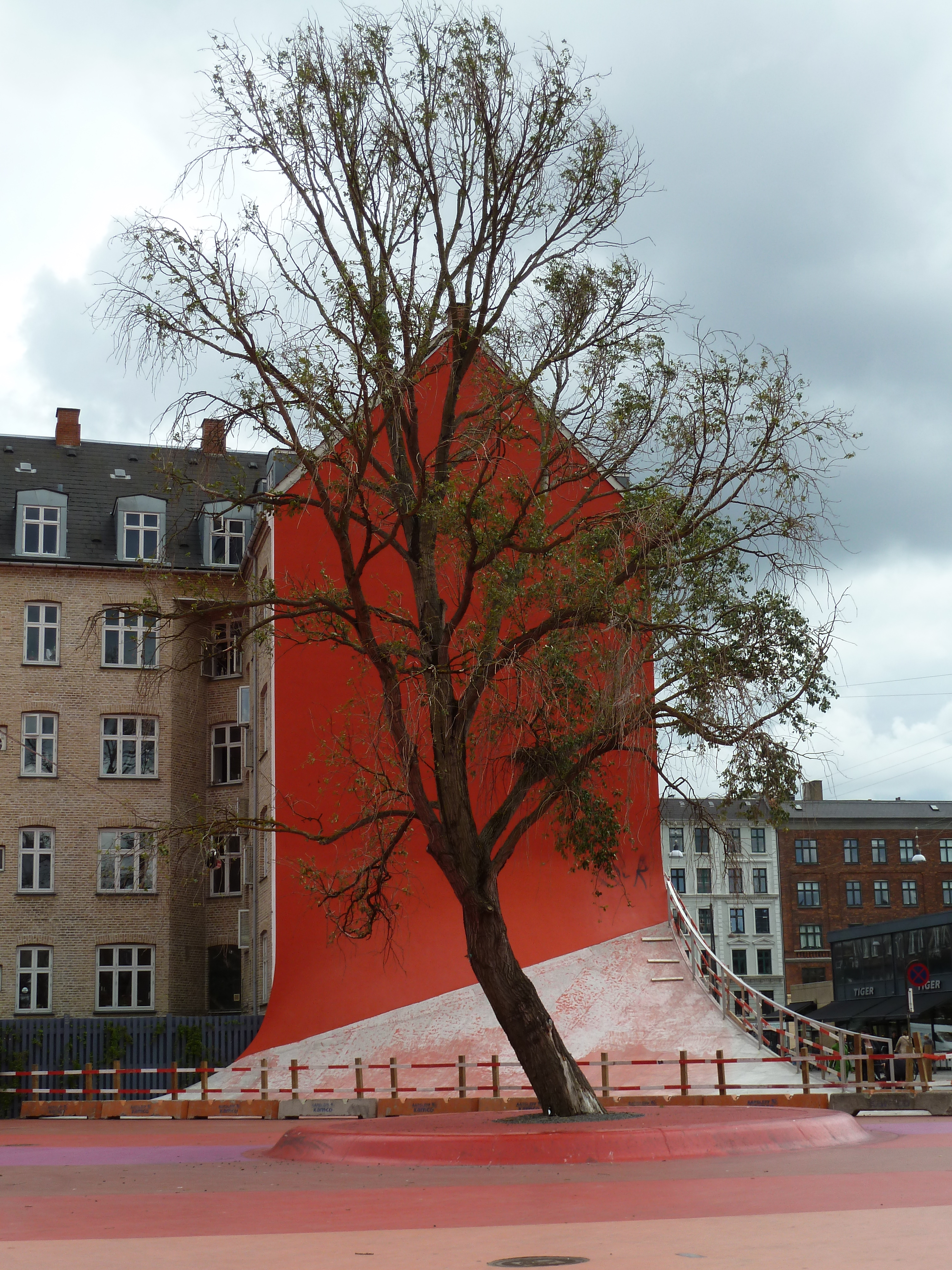
Red area

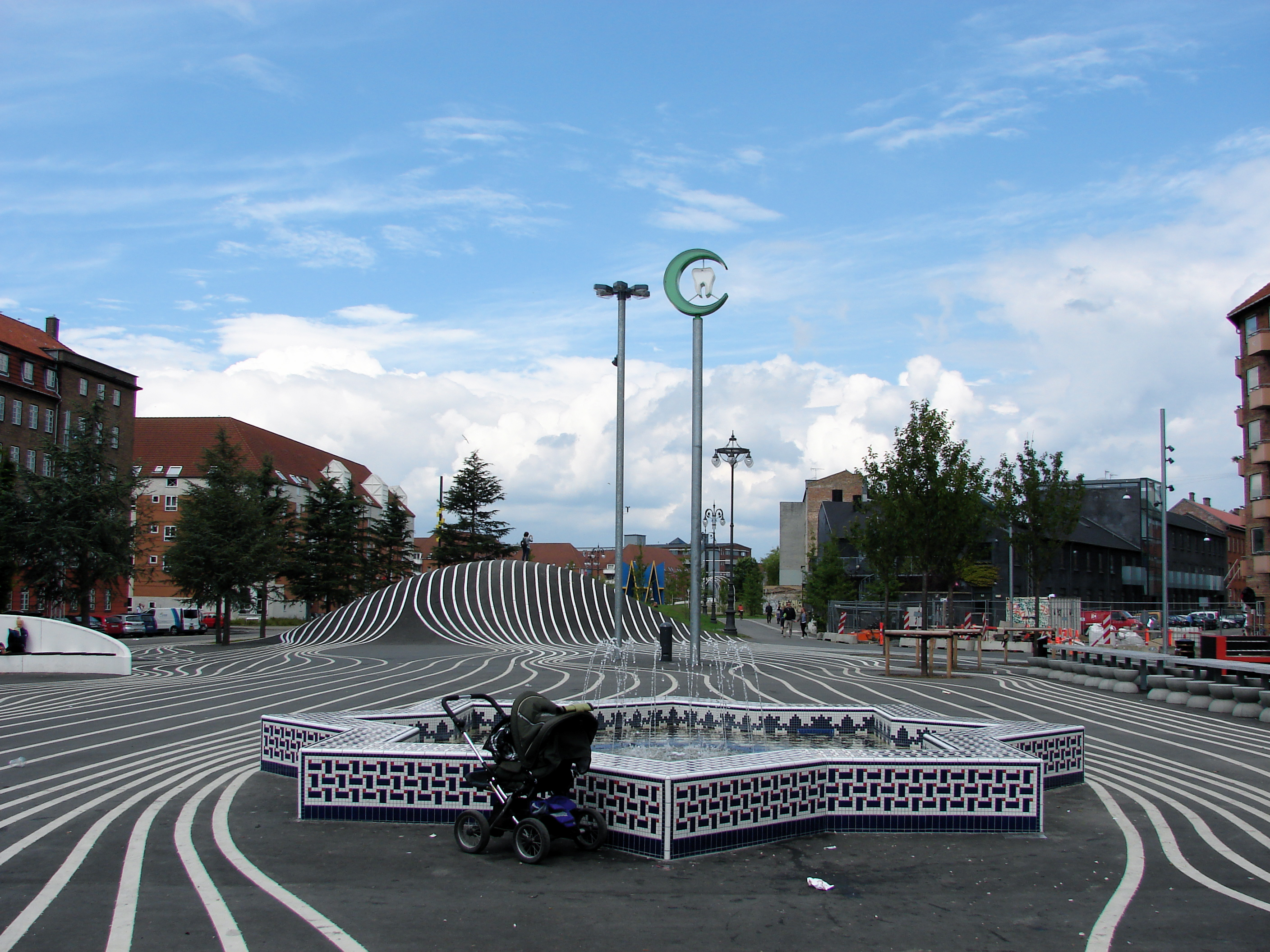
Moroccan fountain

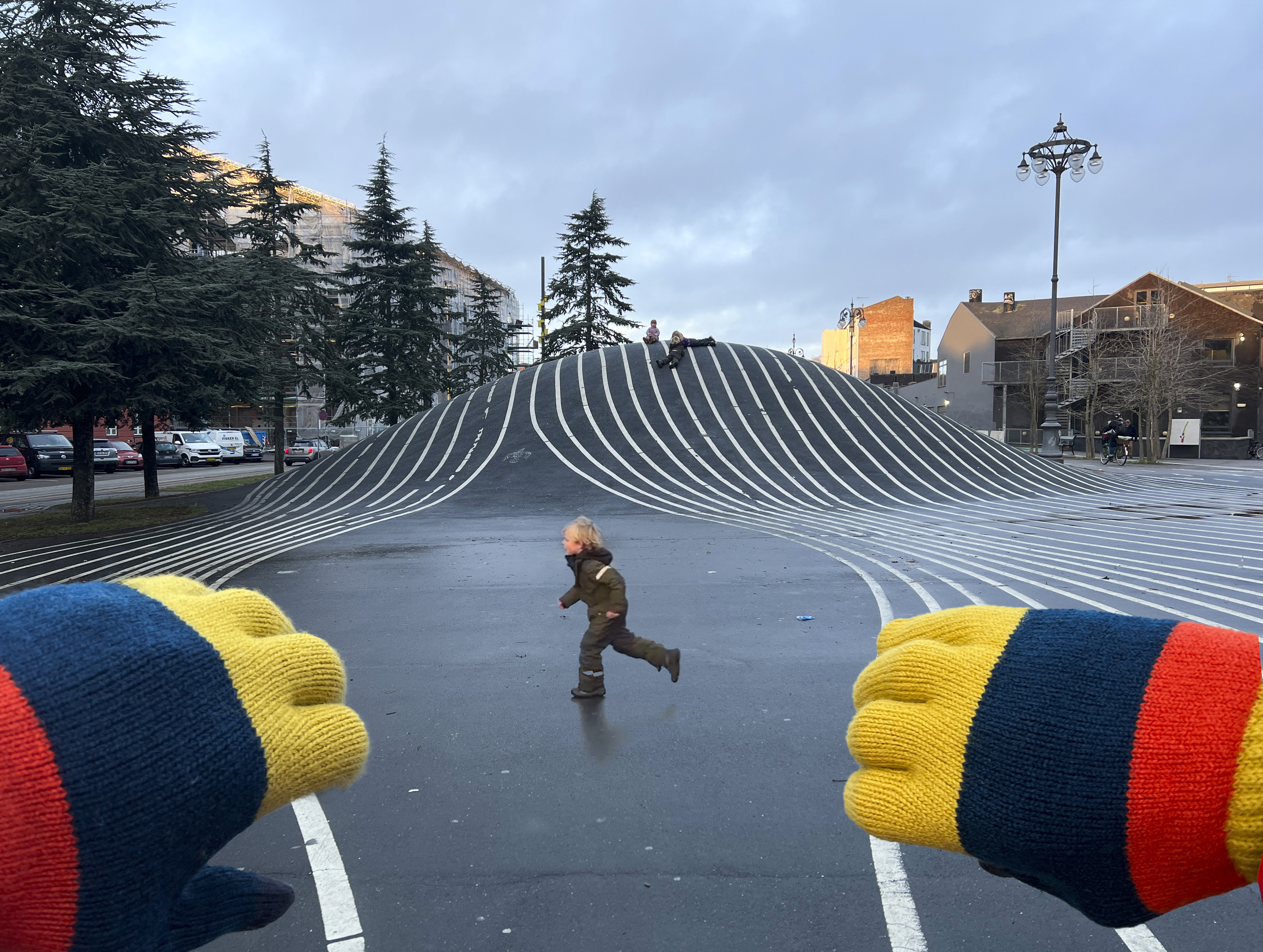
The Black Market
