= Listed buildings in Nørrebro =

This list of listed buildings in Nørrebro lists listed buildings and structures in the Nørrebro district of Copenhagen, Denmark.

== List ==
Listing name	Image	Location	Coordinates	Summary
Ahornsgade 15-19		Ahornsgade 15, 2200 København N	55°41′29.77″N 12°33′34.62″E	Apartment building and workshop building from 1886 and the cobbled courtyard
Ahornsgade 15-19		Ahornsgade 17, 2200 København N	55°41′30.29″N 12°33′33.86″E	Apartment building from 1886 and the cobbled courtyard
Assistens Cemetery		Kapelvej 2, 2200 København N	55°41′27.61″N 12°32′57.25″E	The wall on Kapelvej (1760 and 1881), Nørrebrogade (1760 and 1806), Nørrebros Runddel (1806) and Jagtvej (1831) as well as metalwork, gates and internal walls
Assistens Cemetery: The Gravedigger's House		Nørrebrogade 67, 2200 København N	55°41′36.57″N 12°32′56.29″E	The residence for the gravedigger at the cemetery, built in 1805 by Jens Bang
Blågårds Plads		Blågårds Plads 0, 2200 København N	55°41′10.96″N 12°33′25.75″E	Public space from 1915 design by Ivar Bentson with integrated sculptures by Kai Nielsen
Ewaldsgade 5		Ewaldsgade 5, 2200 København N	55°40′58.93″N 12°33′28.61″E	Former home of the architect Niels Sigfred Nebelong, built in 1853 to his own design
Ewaldsgade 7-9		Ewaldsgade 9, 2200 København N	55°40′57.58″N 12°33′27.32″E	No. 9 is a house from 1858 designed by Johan Daniel Herholdt; No. 7 is a house from 1863 built by master mason Johan Jacob Deuntzer and rebuilt in 1944
Fælledvej 4		Fælledvej 4, 2200 København N	1921	Three-winged residential building in te yard from 1921 designed by H. P. N. Hedemann with internal decorations by Robert Storm Petersen
Holger Petersen's Textile Factory (2)		Tagensvej 85C, 2200 København N	18998	Industrial complex consisting of a small building from 1883 by Johan Schrøder attached to a combined office and storage building from 1888
Holger Petersen's Textile Factory: Workers' housing		Tagensvej 83B, 2200 København N	1885	Workers' housing from 1885 designed by Carl Thorning
Hornbækhus (3)		Borups Allé 5, 7 and 23, 2200 København N	123	Large residential block from 1923 designed by Kay Fisker with courtyard garden complex by G. N. Brandt
Kaffebrænderiet Merkur		Hermodsgade 24, 2200 København N	1858	Coffee roaster from 1932 designed by Carl Servais
Linoleumshuset		Åboulevard 84, 2200 København N	1931	Apartment block from 1931 designed Povl Baumann and notable for its patterned brickwork
Jewish Northern Cemetery		Møllegade 12, 2200 København N		Jewish cemetery from 1694 with monuments and headstones as well as the residence and tall walls on Møllegade, Guldbergsgade and Birkegade from 1873 designed by Vilhelm Tvede
Nørrebro station		Folmer Bendtsens Plads 17, 2200 København N	1930	Functionalist railway station from 1930 designed by K.T. Seest
Rud. Rasmussen		Nørrebrogade 45A, 2200 København N	1895	Combined residential and industrial complex from 1895 with a still operating furniture workshop
Rud. Rasmussen		Nørrebrogade 45A, 2200 København N	1895	Combined residential and industrial complex from 1895 with a still operating furniture workshop
Rud. Rasmussen		Nørrebrogade 45A, 2200 København N	1895	Combined residential and industrial complex from 1895 with a still operating furniture workshop
Zøllnerhus		Gormsgade 2A, 2200 København N	1936	Three-winged apartment complex from 1936 designed by Charles I. Schou and Erik Kragh, with verenda, yard, parking facility and bicycle ramp on its rear side
