= Listed buildings in Fredensborg Municipality =

This is a list of listed buildings in Fredensborg Municipality, Denmark.

== The list ==
=== 2980 Kokkedal ===
Listing name	Image	Location	Coordinates	Description
Karlebo Windmill		Kirkeltevej 161C, 2980 Kokkedal	1835	Stb mill.

=== 2990 Nivå ===
Listing name	Image	Location	Coordinates	Description
Nivaagaard Brickworks		Teglværksvej 23, 2990 Nivå	1864	Ring oven from 1864.

=== 3050 Humlebæk ===
Listing name	Image	Location	Coordinates	Description
Krogerup		Krogerupvej 13, 3050 Humlebæk	1835	Manor house built in 1779 and adapted in 1837.

=== 3480 Fredensborg ===
Listing name	Image	Location	Coordinates	Description
Birkedommergården		Slotsgade 20, 3480 Fredensborg	55°58′31.86″N 12°23′44.64″E	House from 1855 designed by Niels Sigfred Nebelong
Bournonville House		Slotsgade 9, 3480 Fredensborg	55°58′40.01″N 12°23′47.77″E	House from 1761
Dorothealyst		Slotsgade 21, 3480 Fredensborg	c. 1750	Townhouse from c. 1760 designed by Andreas Pfützner
Fredensborg Palace		Slottet 1, 3480 Fredensborg	c. 1750	Official residence of the Danish royal family.
Fredensborg Houses		Bakkedraget 1-79, 3480 Fredensborg	1963	Housing complex from 1963 designed by Jørn Utzon.
Frømagasinet, Havremagasinet		Slotsgade 11, 3480 Fredensborg	1757	Former granary from 1757 designed by Lauritz de Thurah.
Højsager Windmill		Højsagervej 8, 3480 Fredensborg	1870	Windmill from 1870.
Jægergården		Kronprinsensvej 3, 3480 Fredensborg	1737	House from 1737.
Kildehøj		Slotsgade 19, 3480 Fredensborg	c. 1760	House from c. 1760 designed by Andreas Pfützner.
Lille Rolighed		Slotsgade 23, 3480 Fredensborg	1777	House from 1777 with later additions and burial monument to Catrine Marie Møller from 1811, reinstalled in 1962.
Lille Rolighed		Slotsgade 23, 3480 Fredensborg	1777	Shed from 1777 with later changes.
Michael Rosings Minde		Helsingørsvej 3, 3480 Fredensborg	1873	House from 1873 af Johan Daniel Herholdt.
Passagen 2		Passagen 2, 3480 Fredensborg	c. 1750	House from c, 1759.
Passagen 4		Passagen 4, 3480 Fredensborg	c. 1750	House from c. 1759.
Store Kros Rejsestald		Slotsgade 1, 3480 Fredensborg	c. 1723	Former stables from 1723.
Villa Gallina		Slotsgade 2A, 3480 Fredensborg	1757	House from 1757, façade later altered.

== Delisted buildings ==
Listing name	Image	Location	Coordinates	Description
Christoffer Boecksvej 6		Chrst Boecksvej 6, 3480 Fredensborg	c. 1750	Townhouse from c. 1750.
Lille Wendorf		Helsingørsvej 5A, 3480 Fredensborg		Four-winged house.
