= Rolighed =

Rolighed may refer to:

- Rolighed (Frederiksberg), a listed house in Frederiksberg, Copenhagen
- Rolighed (Østerbro), a former country house in Østerbro, Copenhagen, associated with Hans Christian Andersen
- Rolighed (Skodsborg), a former country house in Skodsborg, Rudersdal Municipality, north of Copenhagen
- Lille Rolighed, a house in Fredensborg
