= Jægergården =

Building in Fredensborg

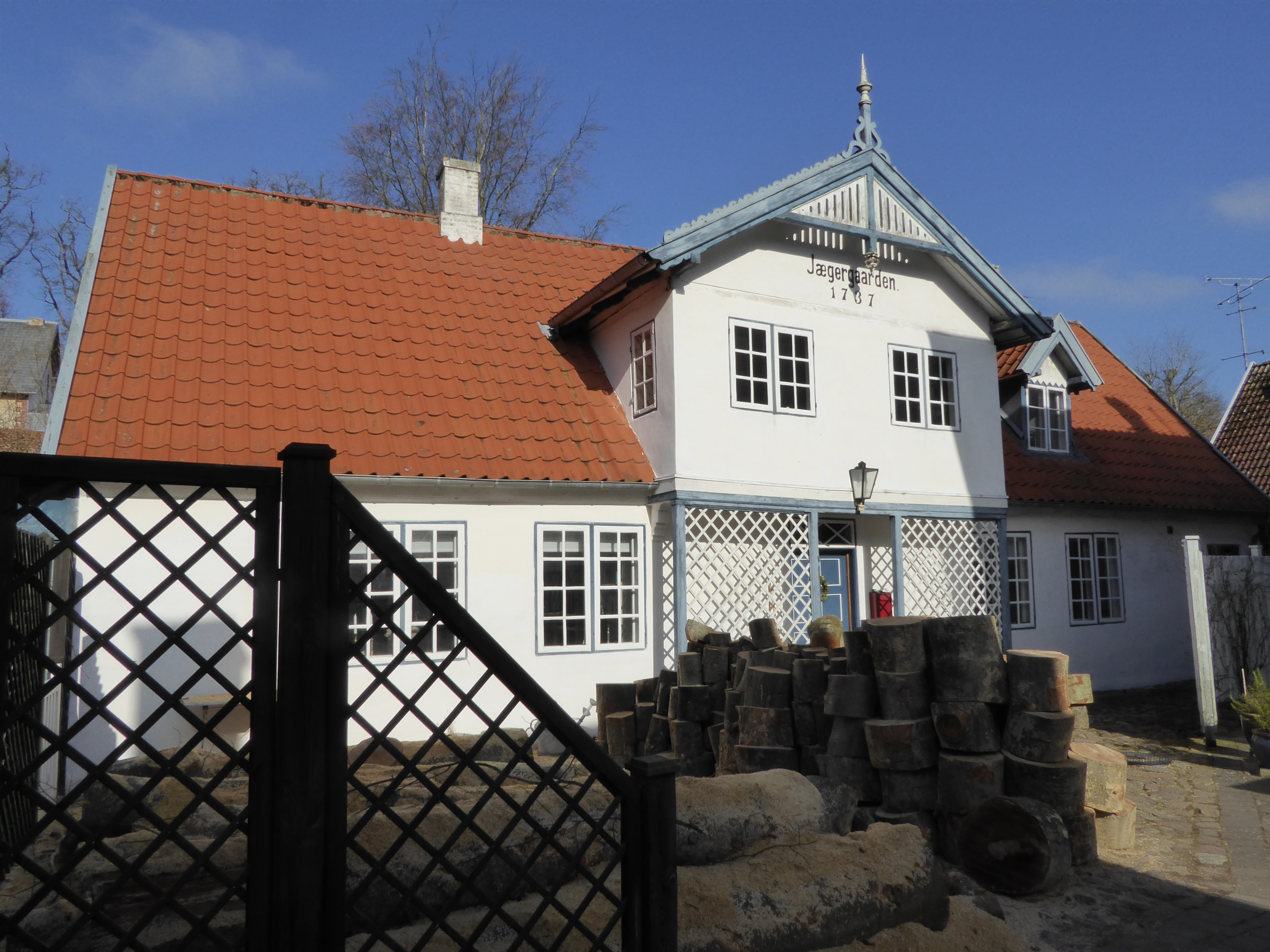
- Interactive map of the Jægergården area

General information
- Location: Kronprinsensvej 3, 3480 Fredensborg, Denmark
- Coordinates: 55°58′47.5″N 12°23′51.22″E
- Completed: 1737
- Renovated: 19th century

Jægergården, situated at Kronprinsensvej 3, close to Fredensborg Palace, is one of the oldest surviving houses in Fredensborg, Denmark. It was listed in the Danish registry of protected buildings and places in 1970.

== History ==
Fredensborg Palace was completed in 1722. Kronprinsensvej, a side street to Slotsgade, was one of the first streets in the small town that emerged outside the new royal summer residence. The building now known as Jægergården was constructed in 1737 as a combined bakery and dwelling for the baker.

In the 19th century, when Fredensborg developed into a popular summer destination for people from Copenhagen, including many artists, the building came into use as a boarding house, assuming the name Jægergården after an even older building in Jernbanegade.
