= Dorothealyst =

Building in Fredensborg Municipality, Denmark

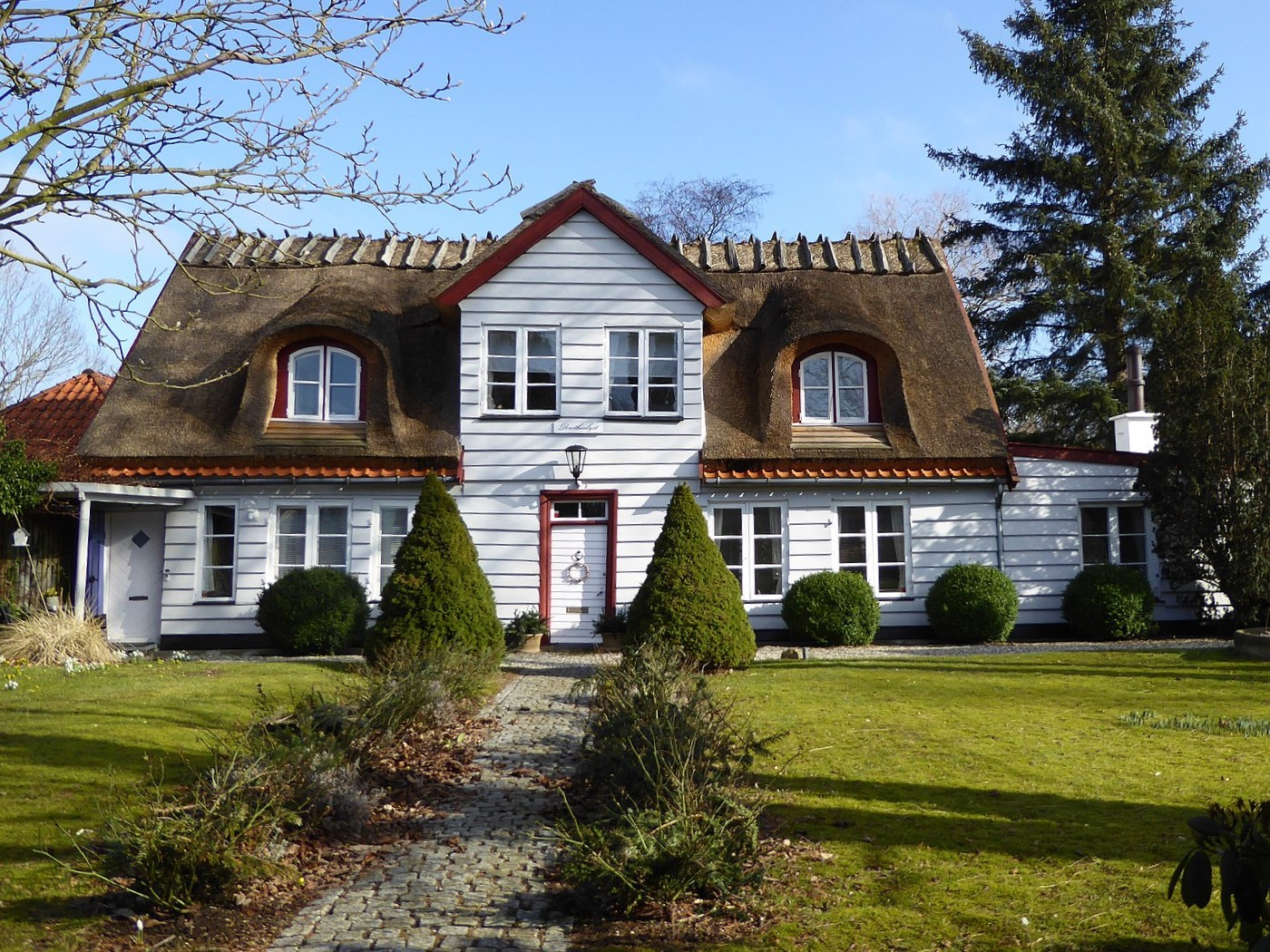
- Interactive map of the Dorothealyst area

General information
- Location: Slotsgade 21, 3480 Fredensborg, Denmark
- Coordinates: 55°58′35.36″N 12°23′49.34″E
- Completed: 1767

Dorothealyst is an 18th-century house situated on the street that leads up to Fredensborg Palace in Fredensborg, Denmark. It was listed in the Danish registry of protected buildings and places in 1970.

== History ==
Fredensborg Palace was completed in 1722. Many of the houses on Slotsgade were built by craftsmen or court officials associated with the palace. Dorothealyst was built by court carpenter Andreas Pfützner (1741-1793) in 1767. He was also responsible for the construction of the neighbouring house Kildehøj.

He was appointed as court carpenter in 1765 and served as alderman of the Carpenters' Guild in Copenhagen from 1776 to 1673. In circa 1770, he was for the second time married to Martha Catharina Conradi, daughter of court master builder Johan Christian Conradi. He bought his father-in-law's house in Bag Hovedvagten in 1772. He had in 1768 acquired two empty parcels of land in Toldbodgade-Amaliegade. He constructed a townhouse for his own use at Amaliegade 8 in 1885.
