= Bournonville House =

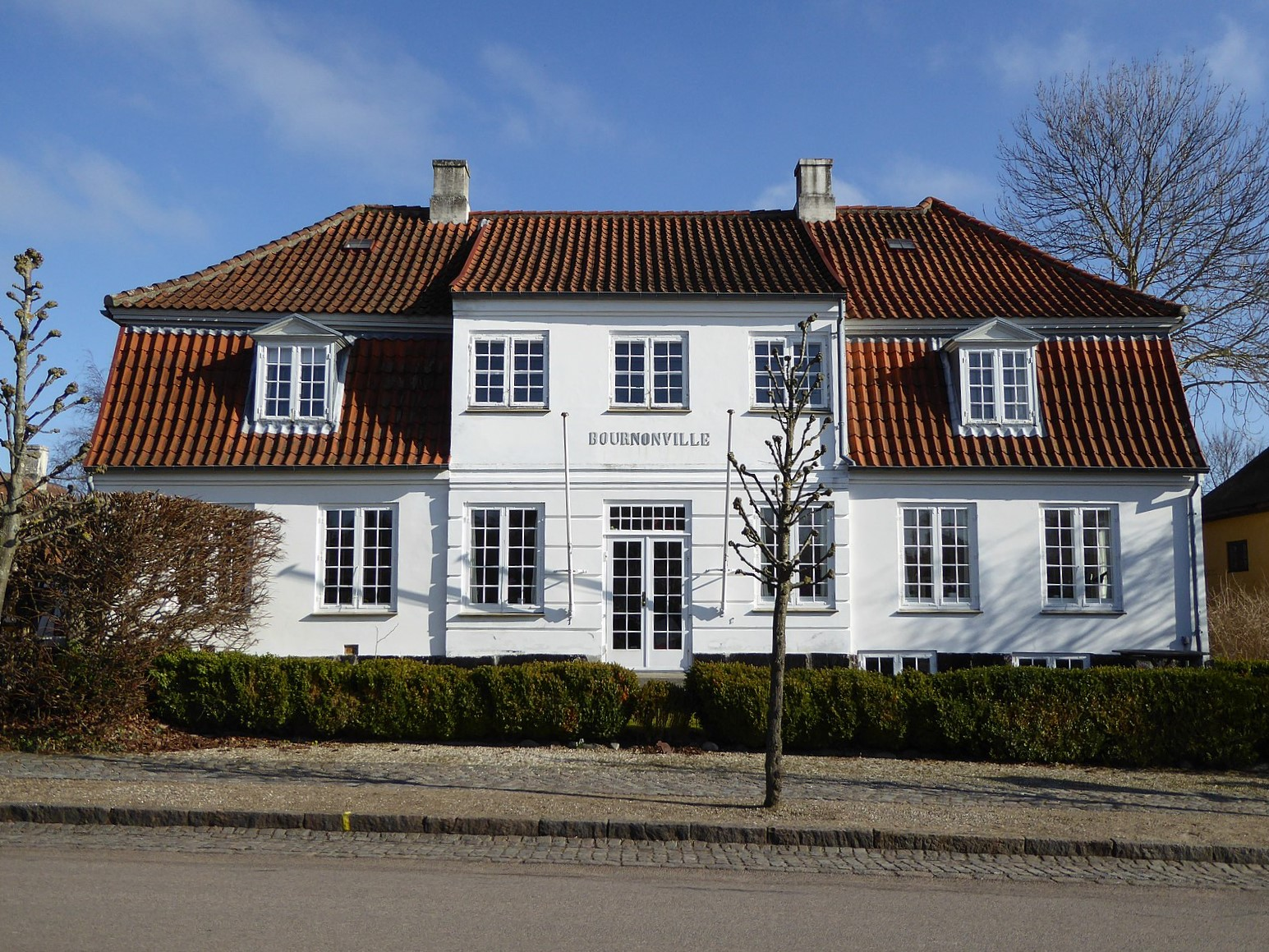
- Interactive map of the Bournonville House area

General information
- Location: Slotsgade 9, 3480 Fredensborg, Denmark
- Coordinates: 55°58′40.01″N 12°23′47.76″E
- Completed: 1761

The Bournonville House, located at Slotsgade 9, the main access road to Fredensborg Palace, is the former summer residence of choreographer August Bournonville in Fredensborg, some 30 km north of Copenhagen, Denmark. The building was listed in the Danish registry of protected buildings and places in 1918.

== History ==
Following the completion of Fredensborg Palace in 1722, Fredensborg developed into a popular summer destination for civil servants and artists. The house now known as Bournonville House was built for royal county administrator (amtsforvalter) Jacob Lowson in 1761. It was later sold to a royal messenger named Berner and it was also for a while operated as a guesthouse under the name Sommerlyst. The Royal Danish Ballet and other performing artists would often visit the town in the summer time to entertain the royal family and their guests. The house at Slotsgade 9 received its current name when it was acquired by choreographer August Bournonville. His father Antoine Bournonville had spent his last few years (1841–43) in a residence at Fredensborg Palace and is buried in the local Asminderød Cemetery. Bournonville used the house as his summer residence until 1879. He was one of the driving forces behind the foundation of the town's first daycare Dronning Louises Asyl for Smaa Børn and made frequent contributions to the poorhouse.

His city home was for the first few years an apartment at Frederiksholms Kanal 16. His next city homes were at Nikolajgade 22 (1857), Pilestræde 45 (1858–59) and Nørregade 33 (1850–61). Bournonville died in Copenhagen but is buried in Asminderød Cemetery.
