= Villa Gallina =

Building in Fredensborg

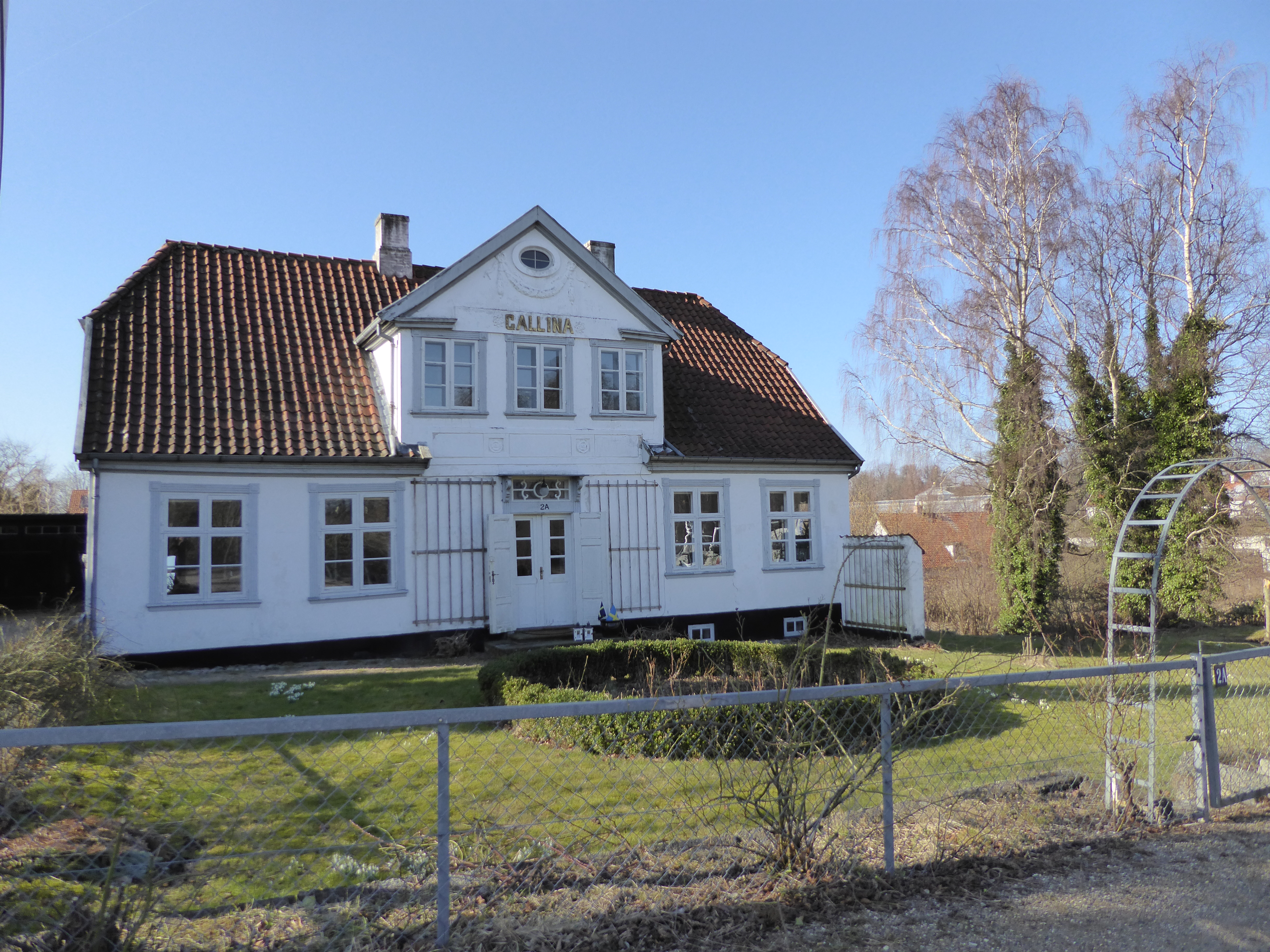
- Interactive map of the Villa Gallina area

General information
- Location: Slotsgade 2, 3480 Fredensborg, Denmark
- Coordinates: 55°58′46.78″N 12°23′44.56″E
- Completed: 11752

Villa Gallina is a house situated outside the main entrance to Fredensborg Palace in Fredensborg, Denmark. It was listed in the Danish registry of protected buildings and places in 1918.

== History ==
Frederick IV's new summer residence Fredensborg was completed in 1722. Villa Gallina was built in 1751–52 by court master mason (slotsmurermester) Schiønning for palace manager (slotsforvalter) and gardener Carl Friedrich Döllner and his wife.

Carl Frederik Döllner (9 December 1702 – 5 March 1765) trained as a gardener under palace manager and gardener Bruhn at Frederiksberg Palace in 1717–20. He then went on a journey abroad to further his education in 1726–27. Back in Denmark, he worked as chief gardener at Blaaåard in Copenhagen (1727—36) and Nykøbing Castle on Falster (1731—51. He was also active as a brewer in Copenhagen in 1939–42). In 1751, he transferred to Fredensborg. He died on 5 March 1765 and is buried in the local Asminderød Church.

== Architecture ==
Villa Gallina is built to a typical Baroque with the later addition of Neoclassical elements. Its walls, which are constructed of timber framing, have been white-plastered and finished with a grey-painted wooden cornice. The half-hipped, red-tiled roof is pierced by two chimneys. The three-bay wall dormer features an oval window and the name Gallina written in gilded lettering.
