= Rud. Rasmussen =

Former furniture manufacturer in Denmark

Rud. Rasmussen, also known as Rud. Rasmussens Snedkerier, was a manufacturer of wooden furniture based in Copenhagen, Denmark. The workshop was founded by Rudolph Rasmussen in 1869 and collaborated with some of the leading Danish furniture designers of the 20th century. Its former furniture factory at Nørrebrogade 45 was listed on the Danish registry of protected buildings and places in 2008.

== History ==
Rudolph Rasmussen was born into a family of joiners in 1838. He was granted citizenship as joiner in 1869 and established his own workshop.

The workshop specialized in artistically designed oak tree furniture. In the mid-1870s, it was destroyed by fire while working on furniture for the new Hotel D'Angleterre.

Two of Rasmussen's sons, Rudolph and Victor (1882–1955), both joined the company and took on the operations after their father's death in 1904. Rudolph Rasmussen Jr. served as manager while his brother ran the workshop. Rudolph Rasmussen was active in the company until his death. He was succeeded by his sons Aage (born 1911) and Erik (born 1915).

In the 1920s, Rud Rasmussen began to collaborate with architects such as Kaare Klint (from 1925) and Mogens Koch. It later also collaborated with Lagens Lassen, Børge Mogensen and Hans Wegner.

== Gallery ==
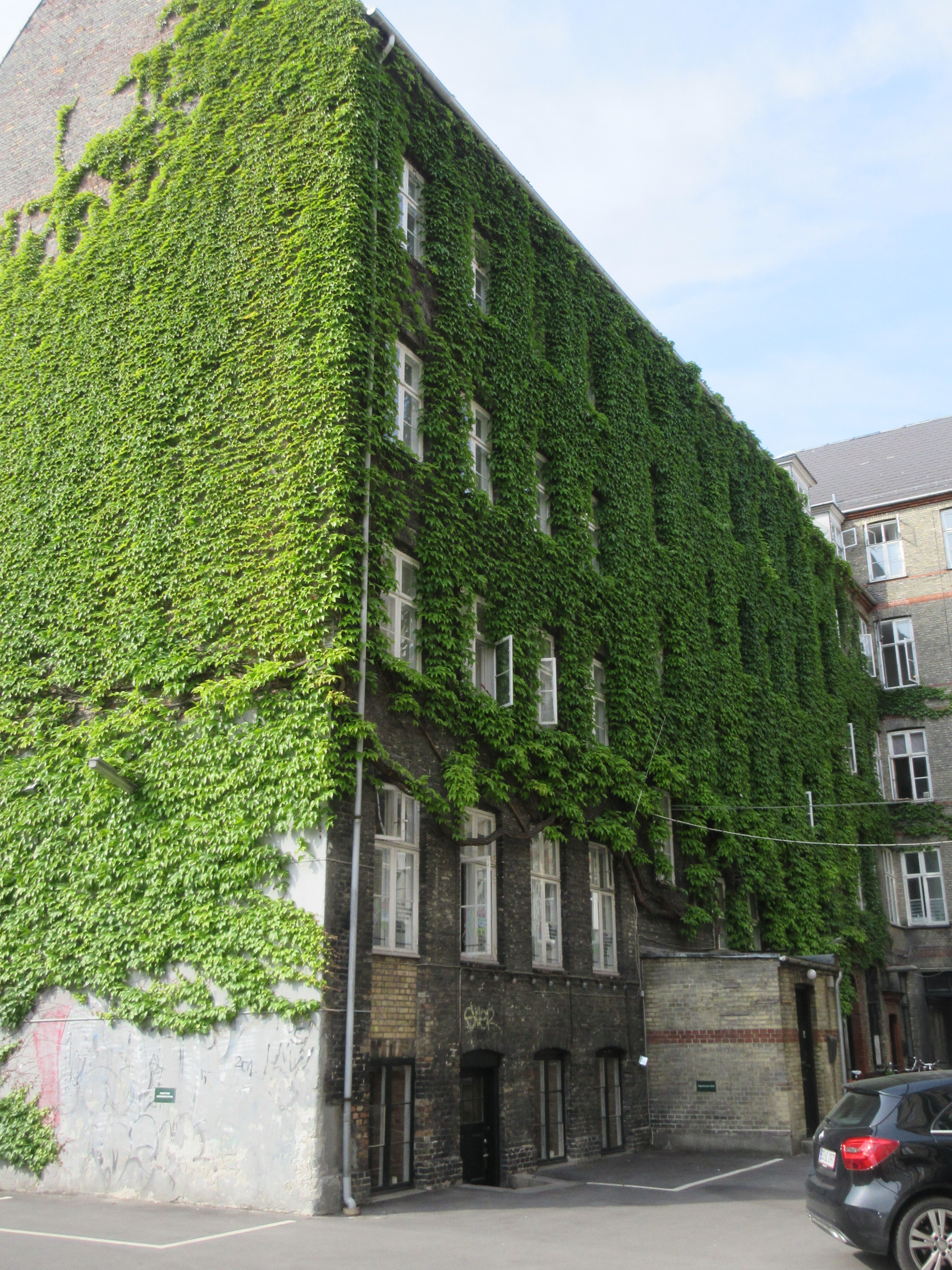
The Stengade wing

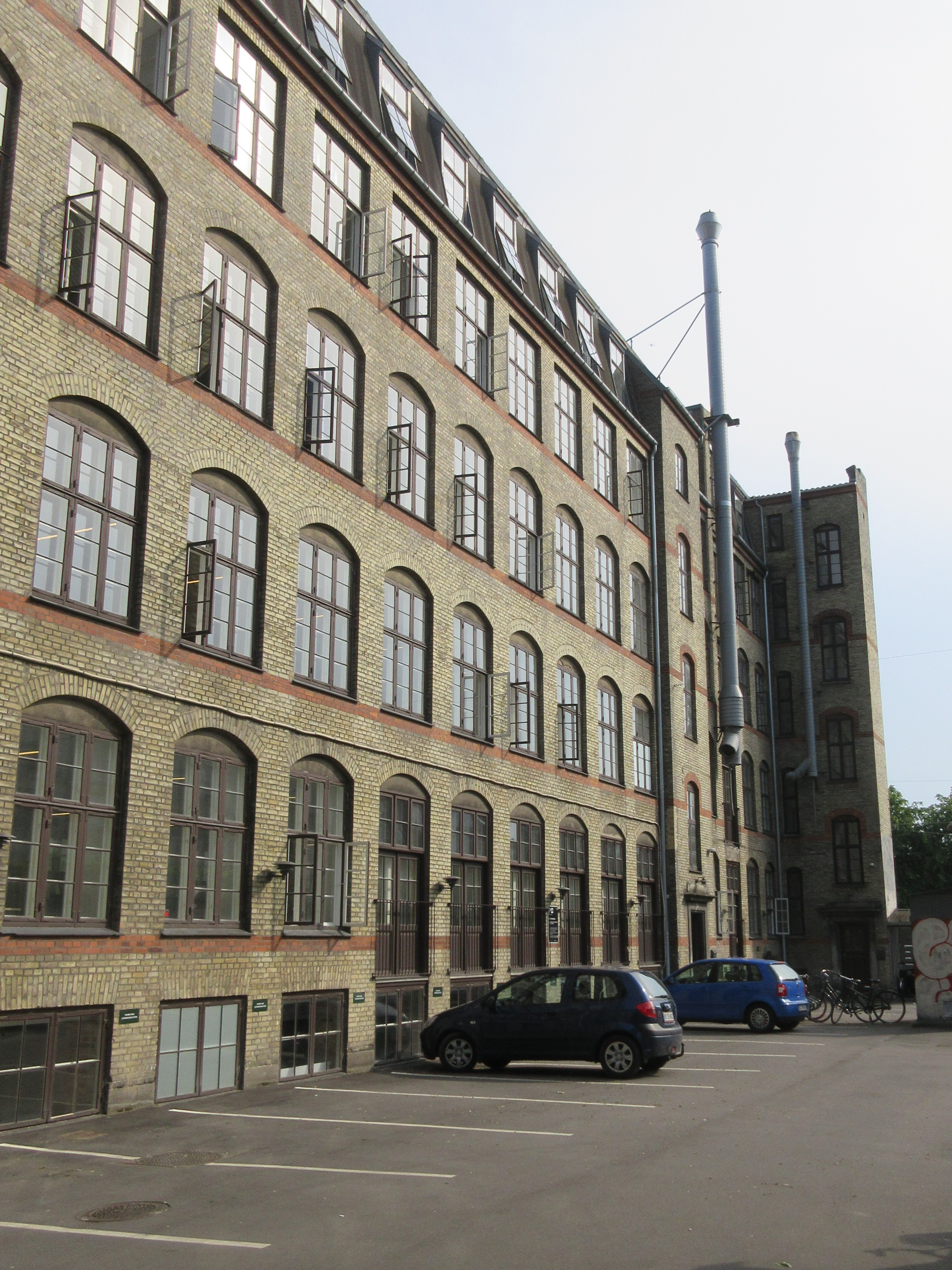
The courtyard wing
