= Michael Rosings Minde =

House in Fredensborg, Denmark

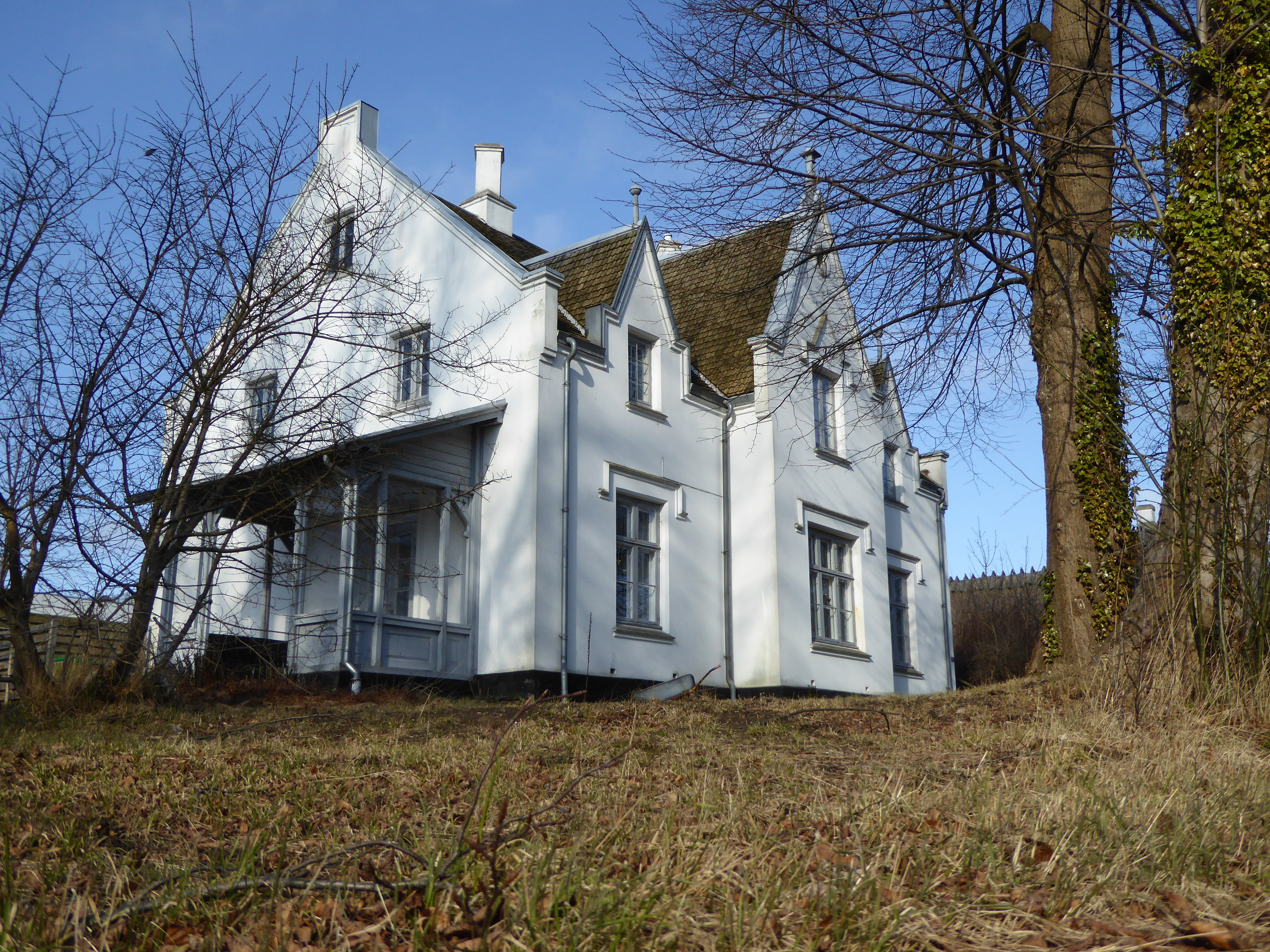
- Interactive map of the Michael Rosings Minde area

General information
- Location: Helsingørsvej 3, 3480 Fredensborg, Denmark
- Coordinates: 55°58′43″N 12°24′9.36″E
- Completed: 1873

Design and construction
- Architect: Johan Daniel Herholdt

Michael Rosings Minde (lit. "Michael Rosing's Memory"), Helsingørsvej 3, is a house in Fredensborg, Denmark. It was built in 1873 to designs by Johan Daniel Herholdt. It was listed in the Danish registry of protected buildings and places in 1980.

== History ==
Michael Rosings Minde was built in 1873 by the architect Johan Daniel Herholdt for a family named Schwarz who descended from the actors Michael Rosing (1756–1818) and Johanne Rosing (1756–1853).

Michael Rosing was from 1778 associated queen dowager Juliana Maria's theatre at Fredensborg Palace as a sort of court singer. The Rosings would therefore spend their summers in Fredensborg and a considerable sum of money bequeathed to Rosing by the patron Henrik, Baron Bolten (Jr.) enabled him in 1792 to buy a house in the town. The Rosings are therefore credited with having founded the artists colony which formed in Fredensborg and survived well into the 20th century. Their city home was an apartment at Pilestræde 37. In 1898 they moved to an apartment at Kronprinsessegade 14. They later moved again a number of times. Rosing's last home in Copenhagen was at Dronningens Tværgade 56 (1814 – 1818 ).

Michael Rosings Minde remained in the family until the 1970s when it was acquired by Fredensborg Municipality. The building was listed in the Danish registry of protected buildings and places in 1980. The adjacent property Lille Wendorf (No. 5A) was also a listed building (1972) but it was delisted in 2017.

== Today ==
The house is now back in private ownership but it is being lent out to Fredensborg Municipality.
