= Lille Rolighed =

Building in Fredensborg

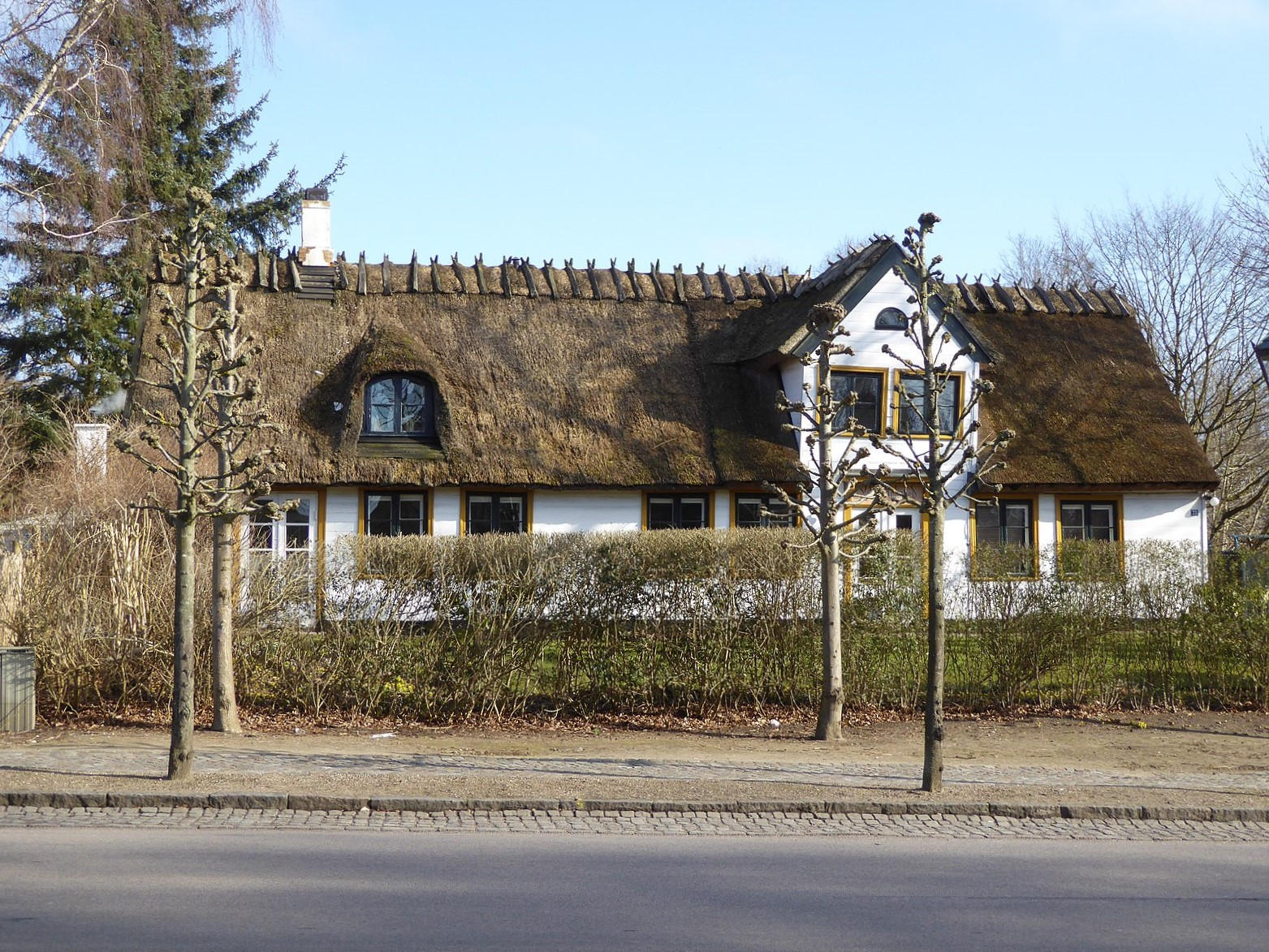
- Interactive map of the Lille Rolighed area

General information
- Location: Slotsgade 23, 3480 Fredensborg, Denmark
- Coordinates: 55°58′34.46″N 12°23′48.95″E
- Completed: 1777
- Renovated: 1820

Lille Rolighed is a late 18th-century, thatched house situated on the street that leads up to Fredensborg Palace in Fredensborg, Denmark. The garden features the grave of embroidery artist Cathrine Marie Møller. The house from 1777 (extended in 1820), an outhouse from 1840 and Møller's tomb were listed in the Danish registry of protected buildings and places in 1964,

== History ==
Fredensborg Palace was completed in 1722. Many of the first houses along Slotsgade were built by craftsmen associated with the castle. Lille Rolighed was built in 1777 by tailor Christian Tøyberg in the southern end of the street.

Lille Rolighed was later the home of embroidery artist Cathrine Marie Møller (1744–1811). In 1790, she became the second woman inducted into the Royal Danish Academy of Fine Arts.

The house was later acquired by a grocer named Steen, who in 1820 opened a grocery shop in an extension. The shop had by the end of the century been converted into a laundry business.

== Architecture ==
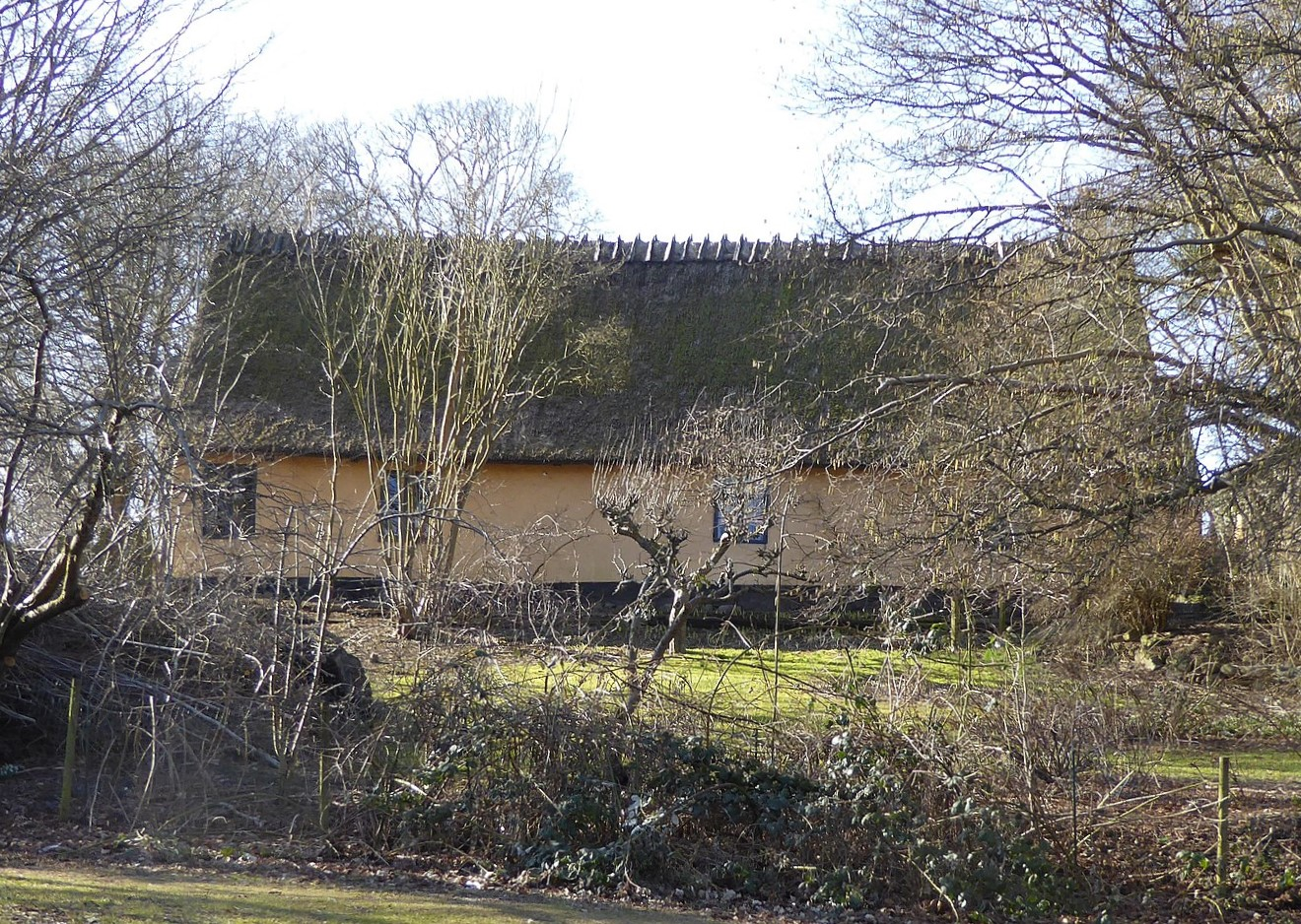
The outhouse from 1840 seen from the east

The original design followed the Neoclassical ideal, but this was lost in 1820 when the house was expanded by four bays on its north side.
