= Kaffebrænderiet Merkur =

Historic townhouse in Copenhagen, Denmark

Merkur Coffe Roastery
- Kaffebrænderiet Merkur
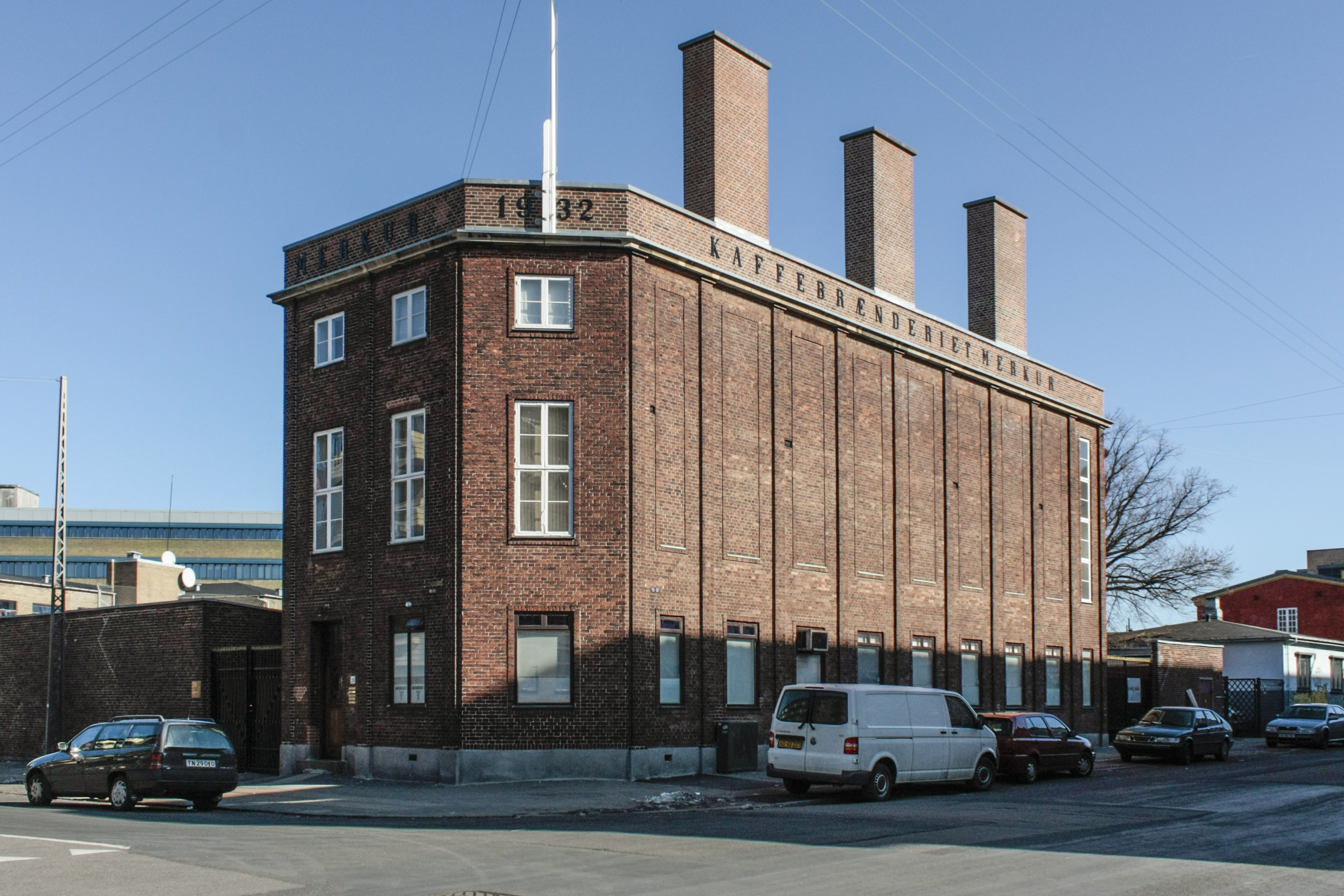
- Interactive map of the Merkur Coffe Roastery area

General information
- Location: Copenhagen, Denmark
- Coordinates: 55°42′13.57″N 12°33′6.44″E
- Construction started: 1932
- Completed: 1933

Kaffebrænderiet Merkur is a former coffee roastery situated on the corner of Hermodsgade (No. 24) and Sigurdsgade (No. 25) in the Nørrebro district of Copenhagen, Denmark. The building was completed in 1933. It was listed in the Danish registry of protected buildings and places in 1994.

== History ==
Kaffebrænderiet Merkus was established by Oscar Nielsen at Vesterfælledvej 58 in 1929. The company was established with an initial capital of DKK 15,000.

The company relocated to a new building at the corner of Hermodsgade and Sigurdsgade in 1933. The building was constructed for the company in 1932–33 to design by the architect Carl Servai.

The building was listed on the Danish register of protected buildings and places in 1994.

The architectural firms SNA and Dencker relocated to the building in 2010.

== Architecture ==
Kaffebrænderiet Merkur is a three-storey building constructed in brick to a simple, Neoclassical design. It has a just two-bay-long facade on Hermodsgade, a mch longer but almost window-free facade on Sigurdsgade and a chamfered corner bay. The almost window-free facade on Sigurdsgade is finished with lisenes. The name of the company is written on the upper part of the facade in brown lettering. The roof ridge is pierced by three tallm robust chimneys.
