= Nivaagaard Brickworks =

Brickworks in Nivå, Denmark

The Hoffmann kiln
- Ringovnen
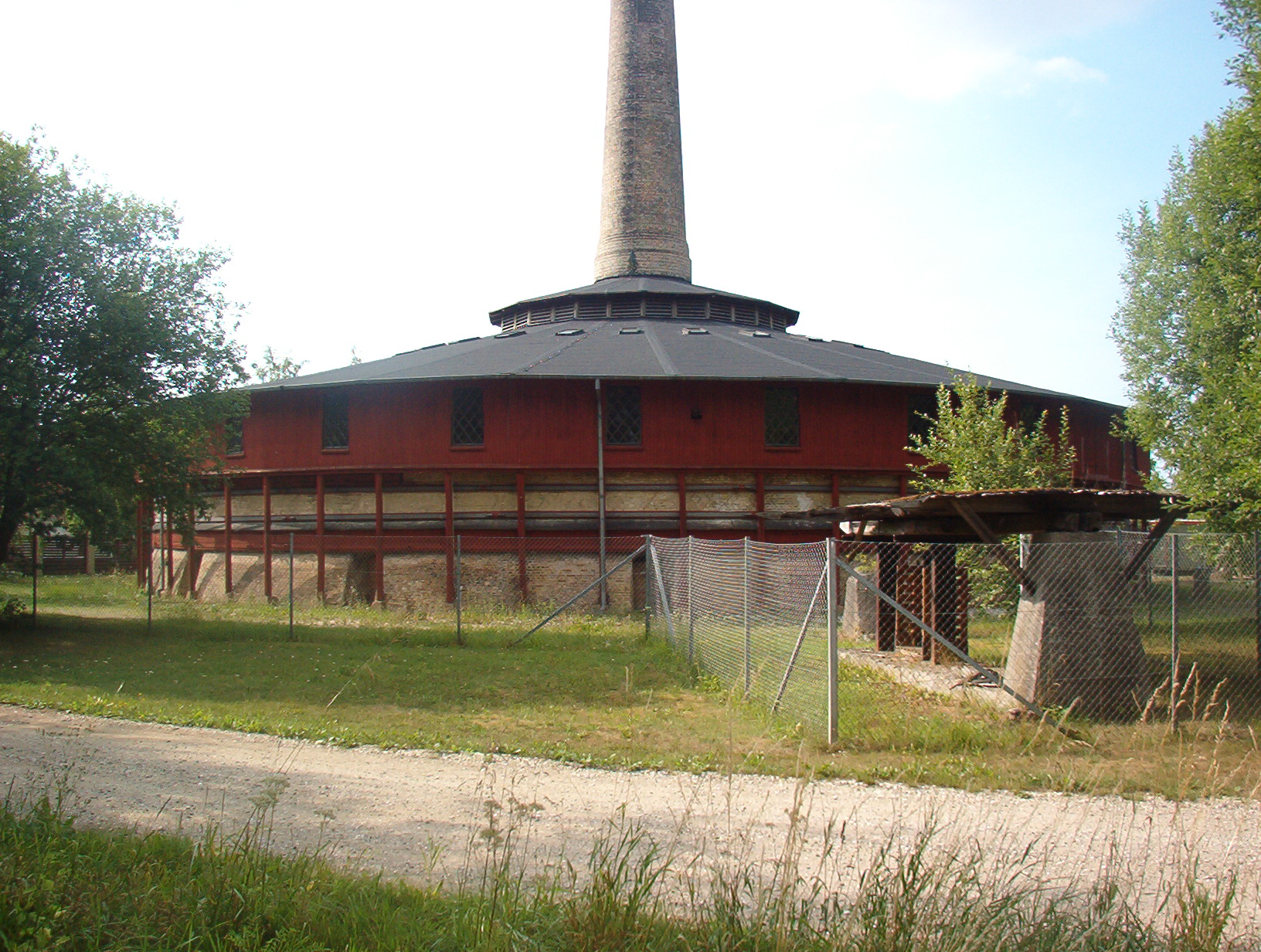
- The Hoffmann kiln

General information
- Location: Nivå, Denmark
- Coordinates: 55°55′50″N 12°30′55″E
- Completed: 1870
- Client: Alfred Hage
- Owner: Den Hagenske Stiftelse

Design and construction
- Architect: Friedrich Eduard Hoffmann

Nivaagaard Brickworks (Danish: Nivaagaards Teglværk) was one of two major brickworks at Nivå in North Zealand, Denmark. Its former Hoffmann kiln was listed on the Danish registry of protected buildings and places in 1985 and is now operated as a museum under the name Ringovnen.

== History ==
One of the farms in the village of Nive was in 1707 closed down by Queen Louise and the site was instead used for the establishment of a brickworks which was used for manufacturing bricks for the construction of Hirschholm Palace. The brickyard was after a while leased by master mason Lars Eriksen (born 1753). It returned to the crown after his death but was after a few years then leased by tanner Hans Peter Frode from Helsingør. In 1765, it was ceded to Jørgen Birch in return for the payment of an annual fee "as long as the necessary materials for the operation of the brickyard was available at the site".

The next owner was Jacob Kielskov. He was in 1781 exempted from payment of the annual fee since the operations were no longer profitable and was therefore discontinued. The brickyard changed hands many times over the next 80 years. In the 1840s, the continuous production of bricks was finally revived. The brickyard was modernized and a steam engine was installed in 1857.

In 1862, Nivaagaard was acquired by Alfred Hage. Copenhagen was at the moment experiencing a major construction boom and with its strategic location on the coast north of the city, the brickyard proved a good investment. With the loss of Schlesvig in the Second Schleswig War, Denmark also lost control of many of its most important brickworks.

A long kiln was constructed in 1869 and Hage commissioned Friedrich Eduard Hoffmann to construct a Hoffmann kiln in 1870. Hage also constructed a long pier which was used for the shipment of bricks to Copenhagen.

Nivaagaard and the associated brickyard were after Hage's death in 1974 continued by his son Johannes Hage. He once again modernized the operations in 1918.

Johannes Hage died in 1923 and left Nivaagaard to Den Hageske Stiftelse. The Hoffmann kiln remained in use until 1967. The brickworks closed in 1981.

== See also ==
- Cathrinesminde Brickworks
- Klostermosegaard Brickworks
- Niverød Brickworks
- Hakkemose Brickworks
