= Johann Gottfried Grund =

German sculptor

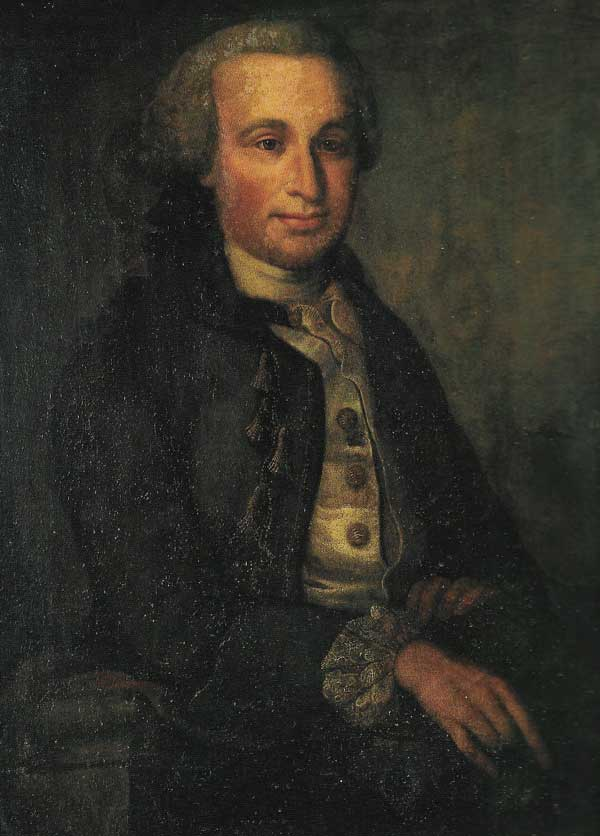
- Born: 27 April 1733; Meissen, Saxony
- Died: 20 September 1796 (aged 63); Copenhagen, Denmark
- Known for: Sculpting
- Notable work: Nordmandsdalen

Johann Gottfried Grund (27 April 1733 - 20 September 1796) was a German-Danish sculptor. He created the sculptures in Nordmandsdalen at Fredensborg Palace. The sculptures in Nordmandsdalen have been replaced by replicas while Grund's original works have been moved to Christian IV's Brewhouse in Copenhagen.

== Early life and education ==
Grund was born on 27 April 1733 in Meissén, the son of Johan Georg Grund and Anna Magdalena Grund. Beginning in 1748, he was educated as a sculptor in Dresden and later worked for Fr. G. B. Adam in Berlin.

== Career ==
Grund moved to Copenhagen in 1757, where he initially worked for court sculptor and fellow Meisener Johann Friedrich Hännel. He was himself appointed as court sculptor in 1766; beginning in 1766 the crown also employed him as a stone carver and stucco artist. He was in 1771 also granted citizenship as basketmaker.

Grund worked at the royal palaces from 1762, partly with repair work and partly with independent works of relatively minor prominence. From 1874 onwards, he was responsible for creating the statues for Nordmandsdalen in the park at Fredensborg Palaqce. The statues of Norwegians in national costumes were based on Jørgen Garnaa's ivory figurines.

== Personal life ==
Grund married Elisabeth Mandorff (died 12 December 1728), Friederich Hännel's widow, on 28 January 1762 in St. Peter's Church in Copenhagen. She was the daughter of basketmaker Jacob Mandorff (ca 1665-1744) and Cathrine (ca. 1687-1755).

They lived in Hännel's former property pm corner of Ved Stranden and Boldhusgade. His wife died in 1780. The building was destroyed in the Copenhagen Fire of 1795. Grund died on 20 September 1796 and is buried at St. Peter's Church in Copenhagen.

== Gallery ==
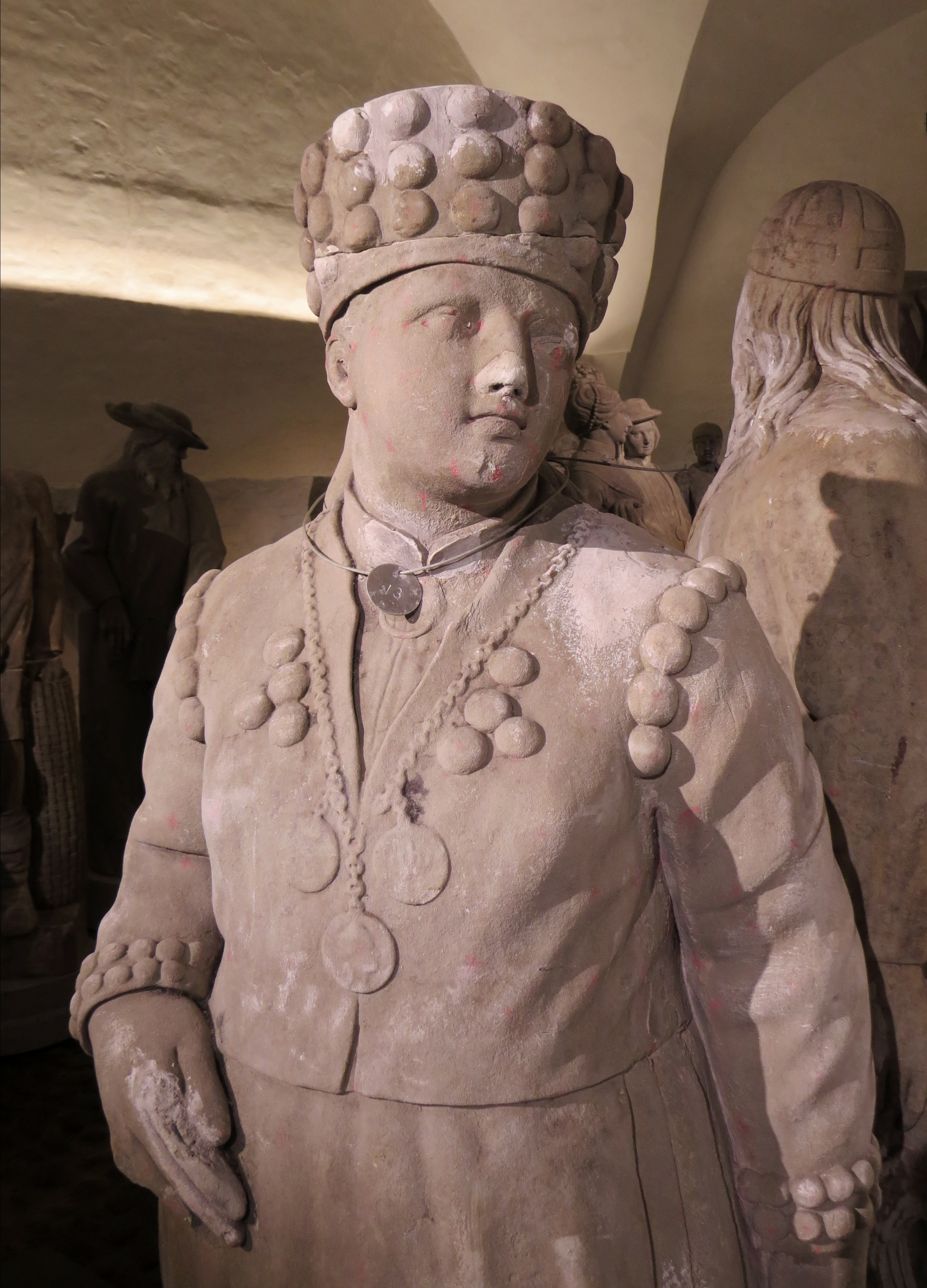
Bride from Vinje Municipality

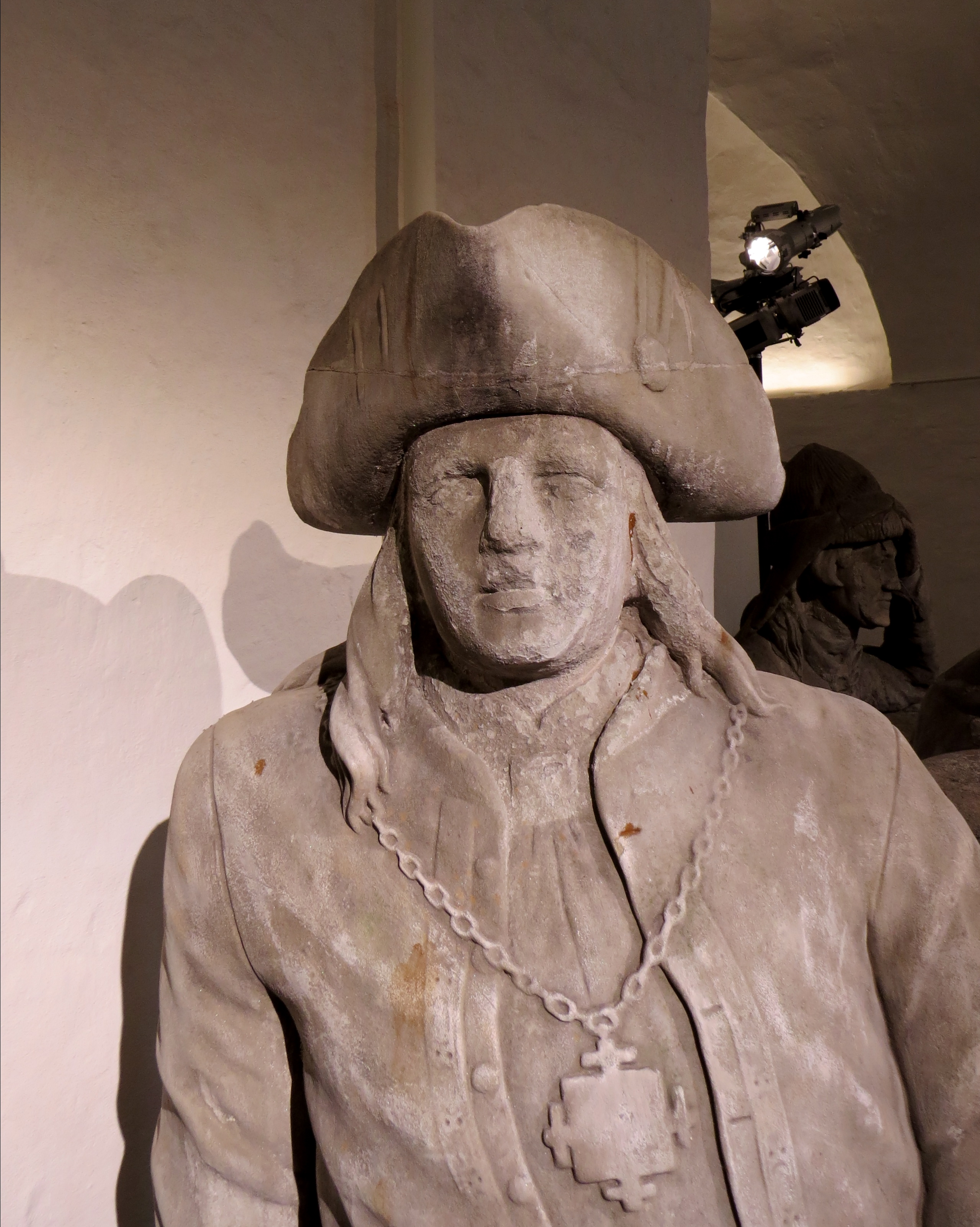
Groom from Vinje

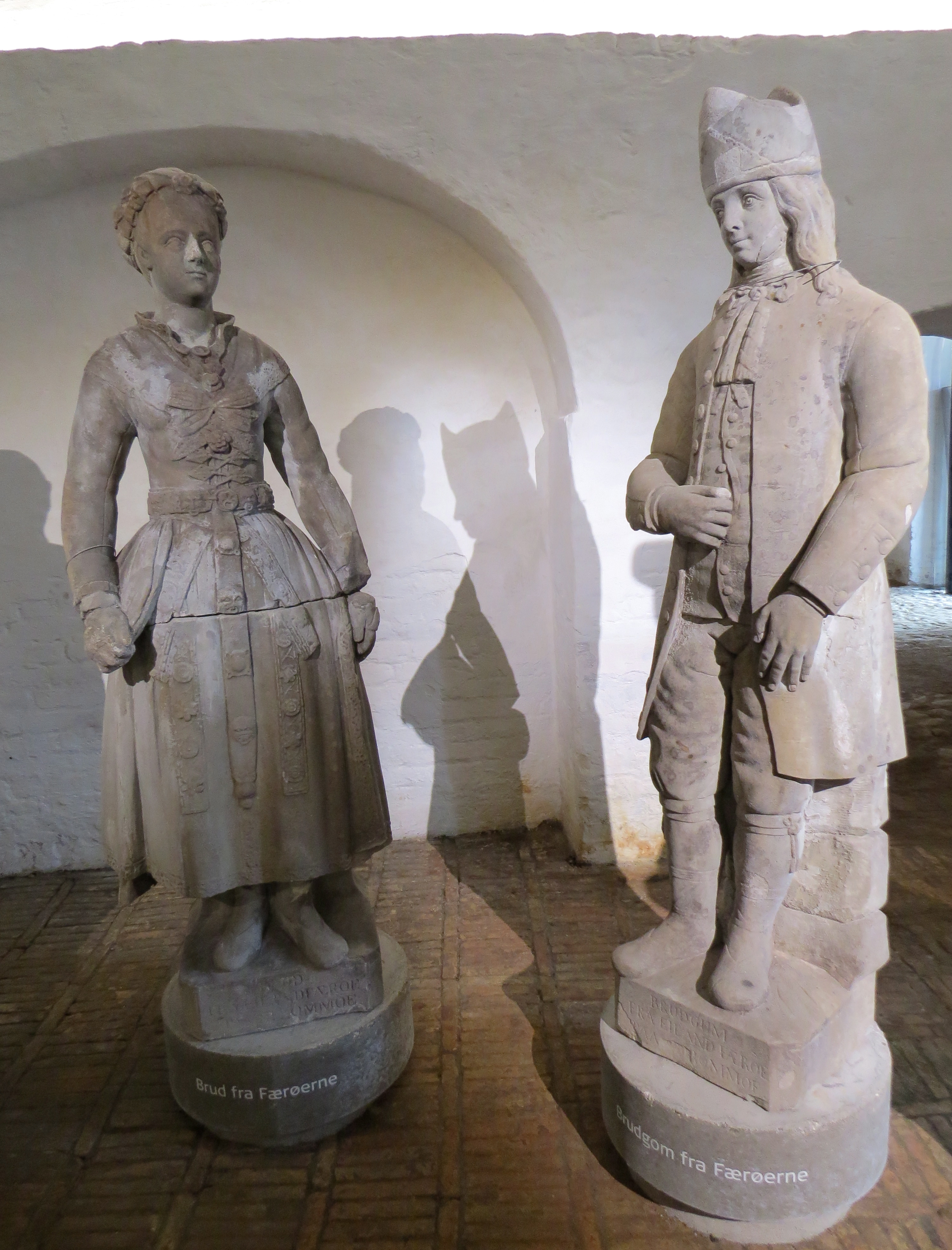
Bride and groom from Eiland on Færøerne

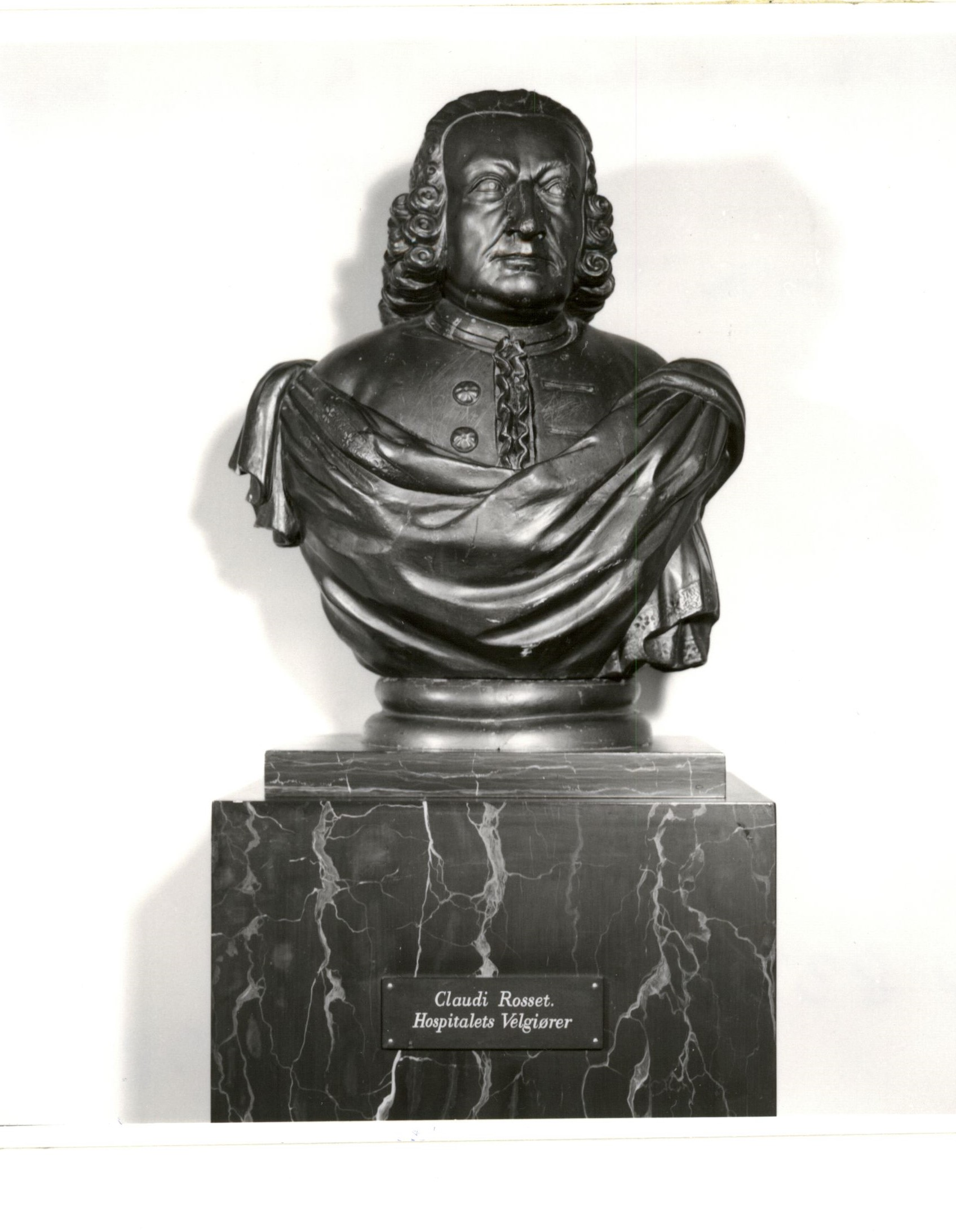
Bust of Claudi Rosset
