= Zøllnerhus =

Listed building in Copenhagen, Denmark

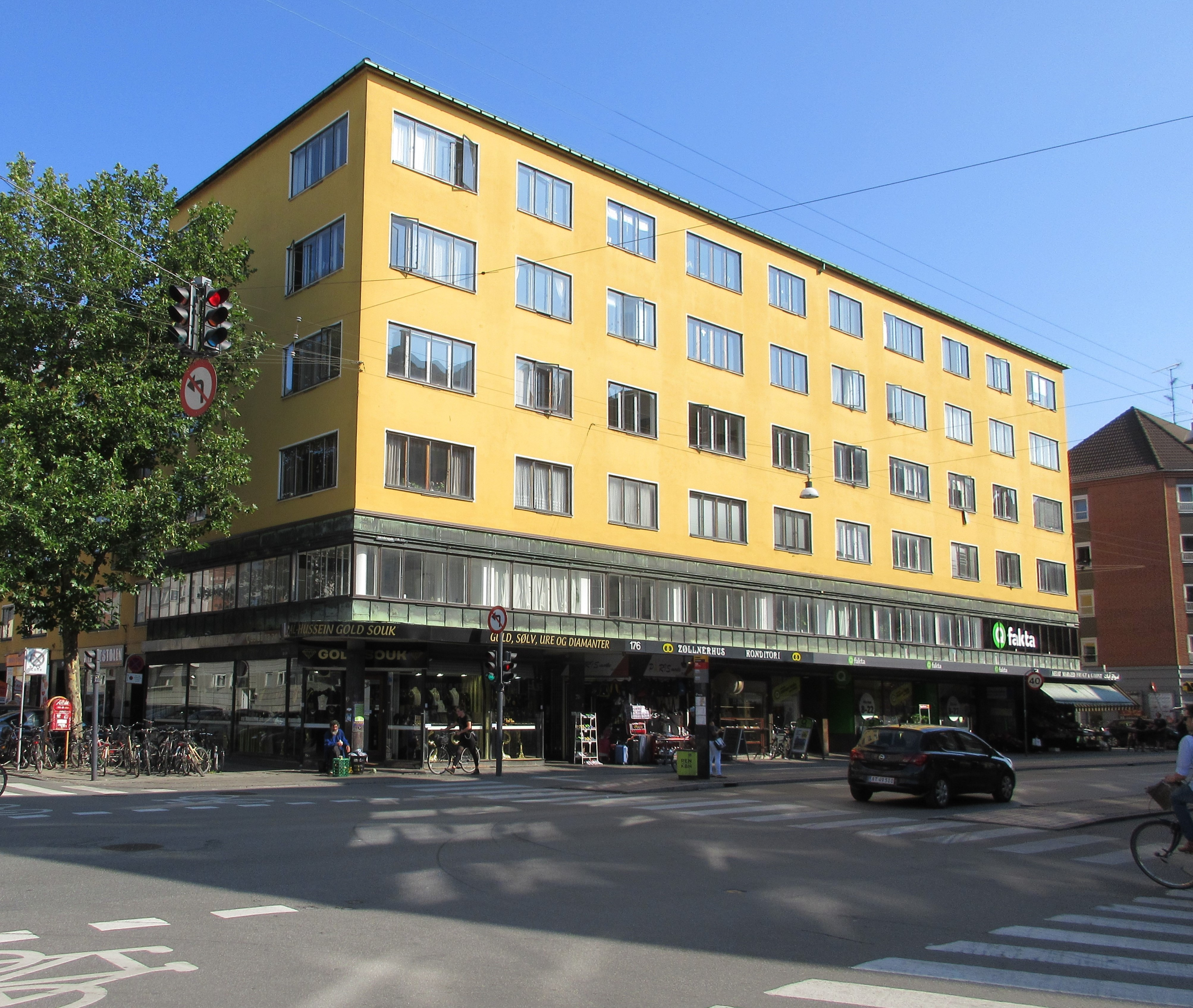

General information
- Architectural style: Functionalism
- Location: Copenhagen, Denmark
- Coordinates: 55°41′48.66″N 12°32′44.23″E
- Construction started: 1934
- Completed: 1935

Design and construction
- Architects: Charles I. Schou and Erik Kragh

Zøllnerhus is a three-winged, Functionalist mixed-use building situated on Nørrebrogade (No. 174–176), between Allersgade (No. 1) and Gormsgade (No. 2A–B) in the Nørrebro district of Copenhagen, Denmark. Completed in 1935 to designs by Charles I. Schou and Erik Kragh, it is one of the earliest examples in Denmark of a multi-storey apartment building constructed in reinforced concrete. The building was listed in the Danish registry of protected buildings and places in 2007.

== History ==
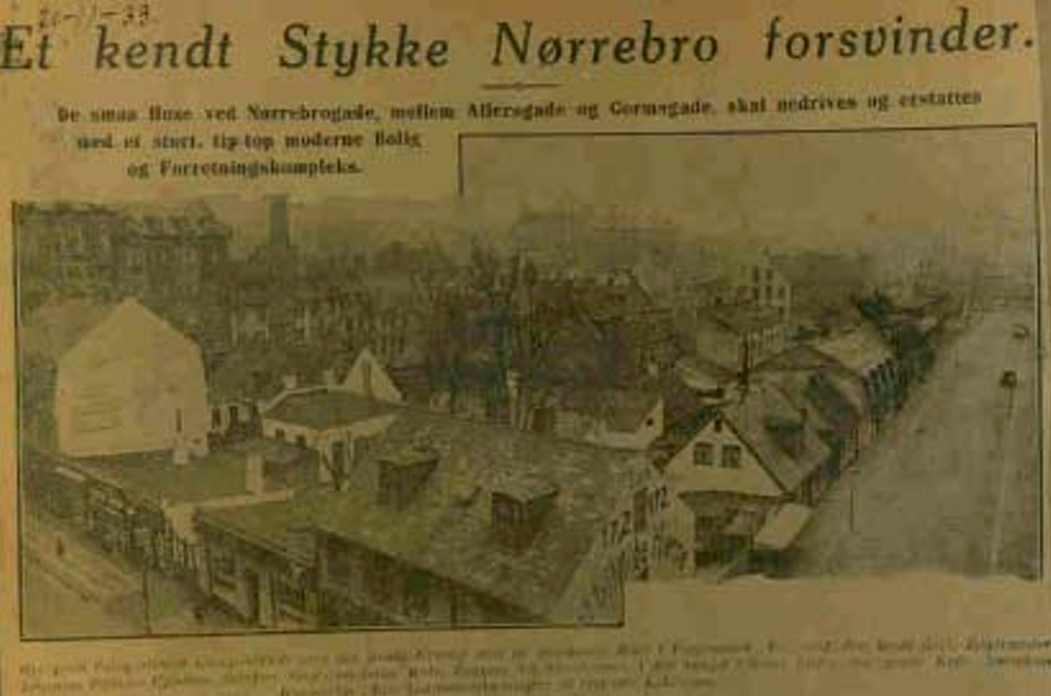
The site in 1933.

Back in the early 1930s, four smaller buildings were located on the site. Three of them were owned by the brothers Ludvig and Georg Zøllner, both of whom were master butchers. Two of the buildings were used by their butcher's business. Their third building was the site of a bar, Nørrebros Himmerrige, managed by a widow barkeeper. The fourth building was owned by master baker Johannes Pitzner. The present building on the site was constructed for the two Zøller brothers with the assistance of the architects Charles I. Schou and Erik Kragh. Schou had been a regular customer in Zøllner's chop. The architects were assisted by the engineers e Peder Bruun and Adolf Schrøder (Svanevænget 12, Copenhagen). Pitzner was not willing to sell his building to the Zøllner brothers. In the end, the municipality, which wanted to widen the two side streets, chose to expropriate his building.

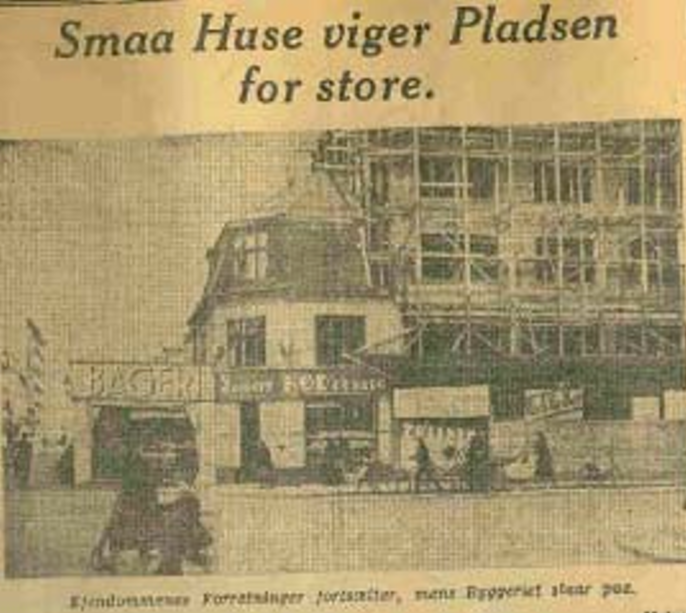
Zøllnerhus under construction with the remains of one of the old building from where the Zøllner brothers continued their butcher's shop.

Construction started in 1934. Due to the widening of the side streets, it was possible for the Zøllner brothers to continue their butcher business from one half of one of the old buildings while the new building was being erected. Pitzner's bakery was continued from a temporary wooden building for the two years that the construction took place. A highly polluting excavator was initially employed in the work with preparing the basement. Due to complaints from the neighbors in the newspaper Social-Demokraten, this work was put on hold by the city and was subsequently completed by hand. The building was completed in 1935. A one-storey garage building was added in 1936.

The new building contained five retail spaces on the ground floor. The Zøllner brothers' butcher's shop occupied the central part of the ground floor. Pitzner's bakery was located on the corner with Gormsgade. It was followed by a shop with leatherware. The shops on Allersgade were a corner shop and a wine shop. Three of the retail spaces were merged into a single one for the in 1989–1993.

The building has remained in the hands of the Zøllner family until at least the 2000s. The building was listed in the Danish registry of protected buildings and places in 2007.

== Architecture ==
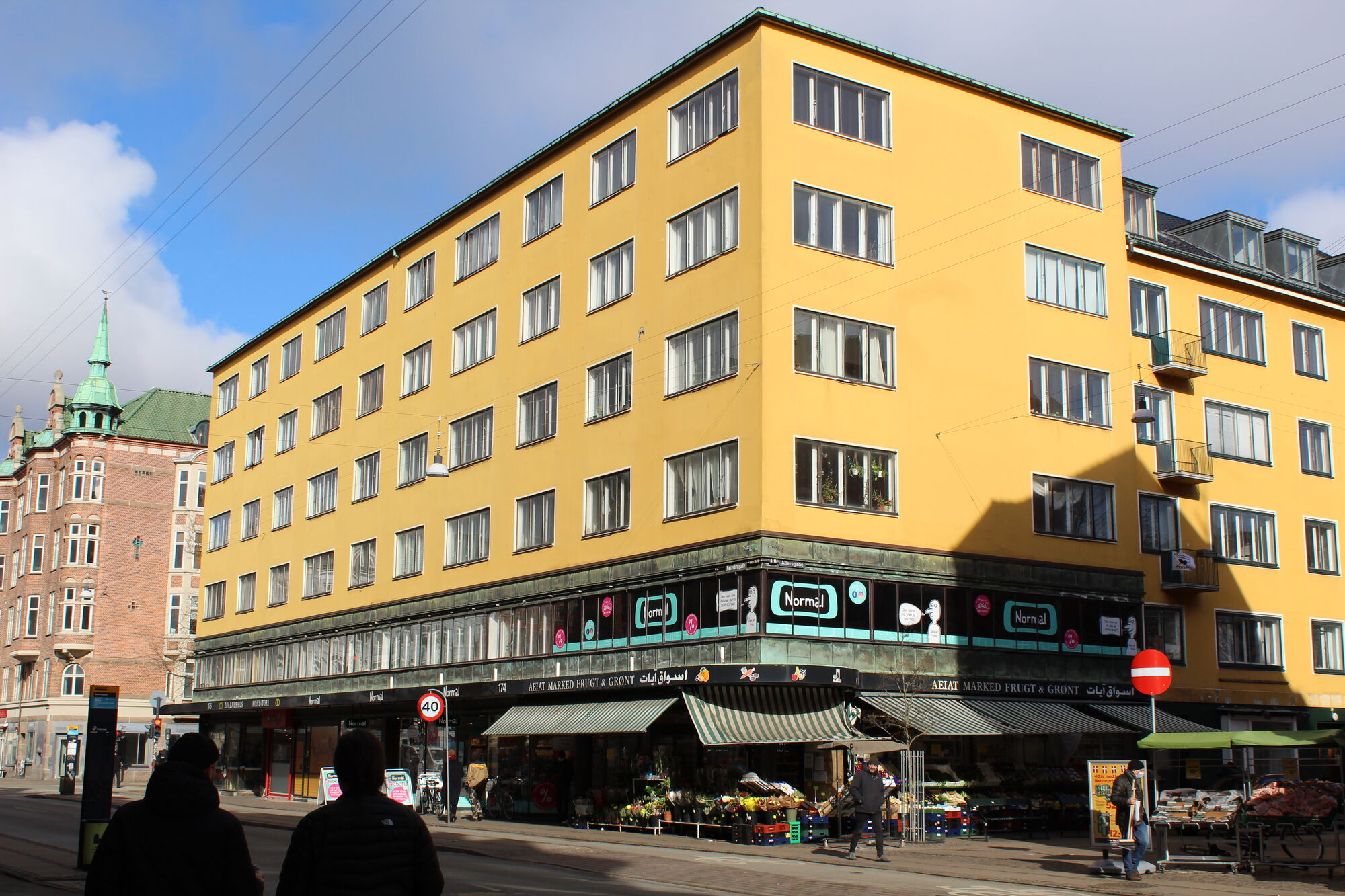
Zøllnerhus in 2021.

Zøllnerhus is a three-winged building, with a six-storey main wing towards Nørrebgadegade and two five-storey wins towards the two side streets. The slightly recessed ground floor is clad in copper. It is protected by a projecting copper canopy. The upper part of the facade was originally cream-coloured but is now painted yellow. The green-painted iron windows are surrounded by white-painted bands. The two side wings have slender concrete balconies with metal railings facing the street and all three wings have similar balconies facing the yard. A single-storey extension, whose roof served as verenda, occupies approximately half of the central courtyard.
