= Ewaldsgade =

Street in Copenhagen, Denmark

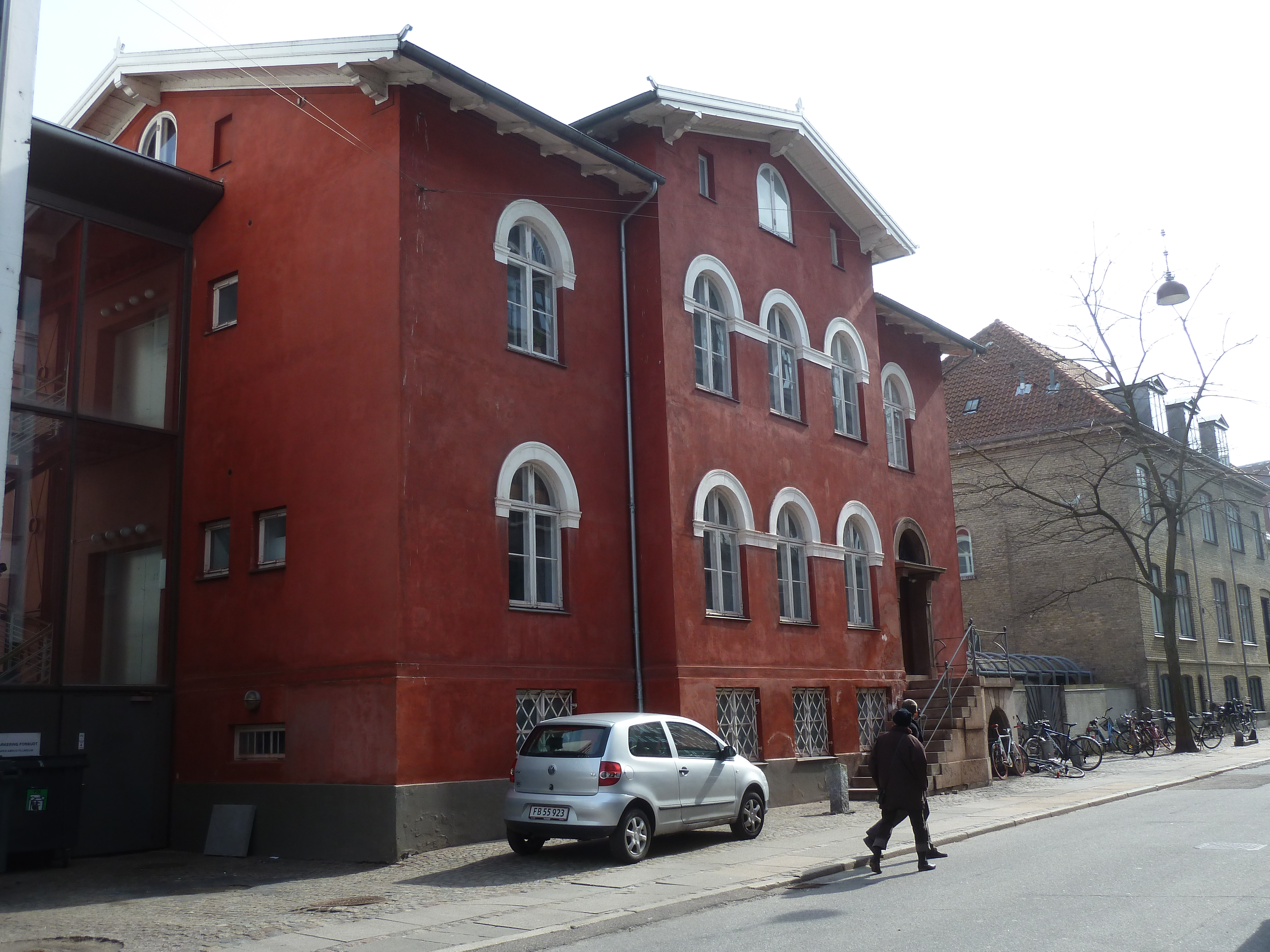
Ewaldsgade with the listed building at No. 5 (red building)

Ewaldsgade is a street in the Nørrebro district of Copenhagen, Denmark. It runs from Åboulevard in the south to Smedegade in the north. The buildings on the east side of the street overlook Peblinge Lake. The street is named for the poet Johannes Ewald.

== History ==
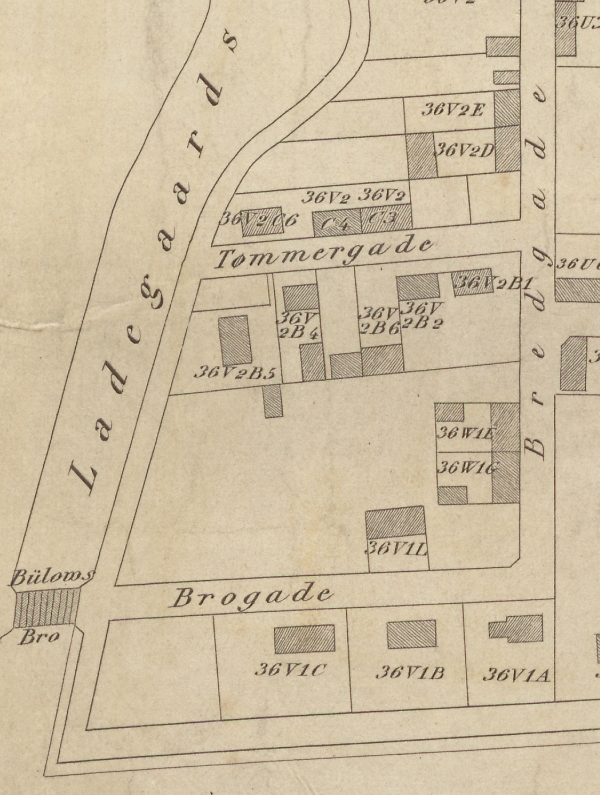
Ewaldsgade—then referred to as Brogade—on a map detail from 1856

Ewaldsgade was created by Frederik Christopher Bülow, the inspector at Københavns Ladegård, who acquired large areas of land in Frederiksberg and Nørrebro, selling it off in lots for urban development. Ladegårdsåen had still not been covered and Bülow therefore constructed a private bridge across the canal to connect the new street to Ladegårdsvej. The street was initially referred to as Brogade (Bridge Street). The land in Nørrebro was generally built over with high-density apartment buildings for the working class. Due to the proximity to Peblinge Lake, Ewaldsgade was, however, reserved for more exclusive homes for members of the bourgeoisie. Bülow also constructed a home for himself in the street.

== Notable buildings and residents ==
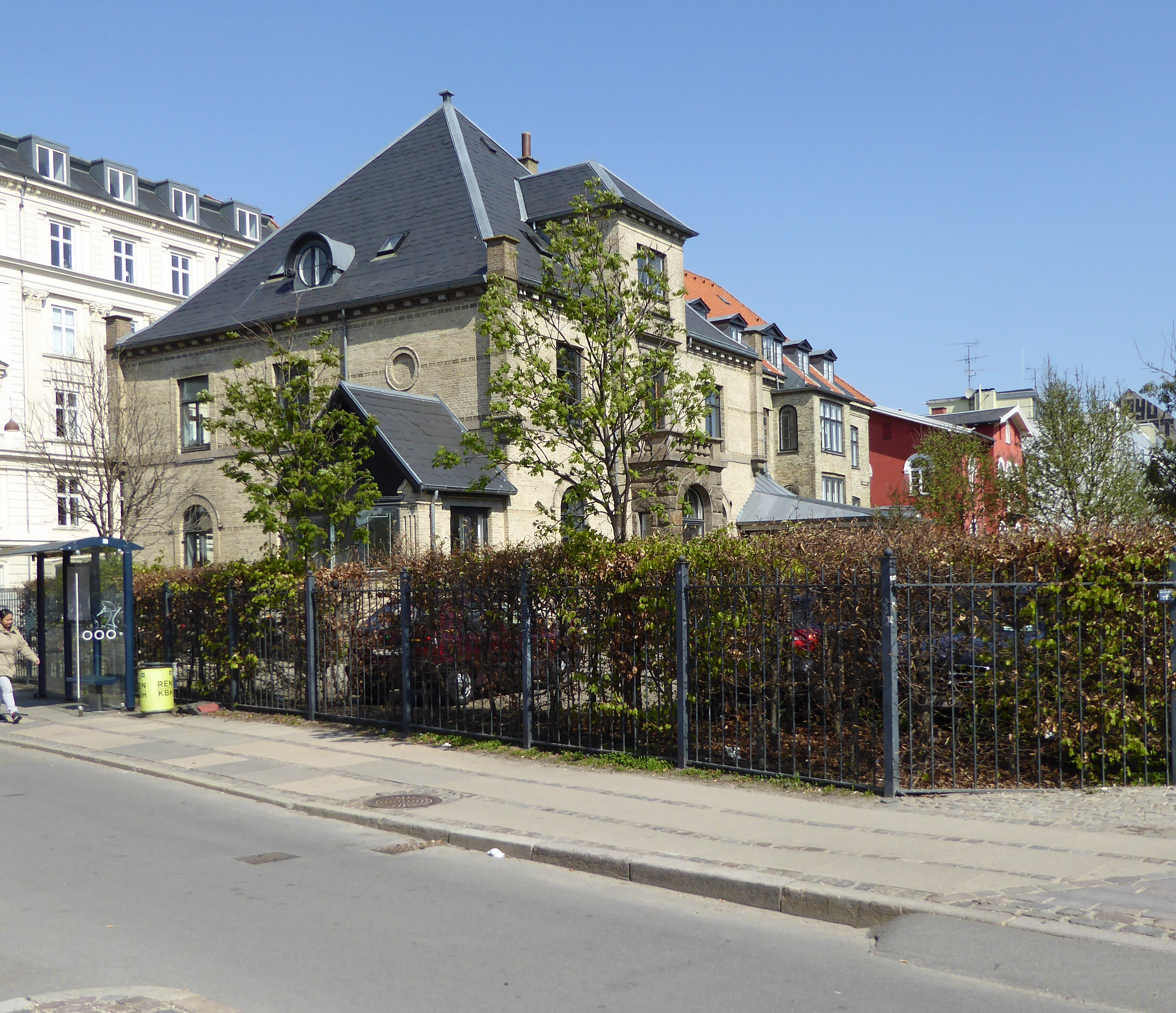
No. 7-9 seen from Åboulevard

Frederik Christopher Bülow's own house is located at No. 5. It was completed in 1852 to a Historicist design by Niels Sigfred Nebelong. The building was listed on the Danish registry of protected buildings and places by the Danish Heritage Agency in 1978. The two adjacent villas at No. 7 and No. 9 are also listed. No. 9 is from 1859 and was designed by the architect Johan Daniel Herholdt for his own use. Np. 7 is from 1863 and was designed by the master builder and architect Johan Jacob Deuntzer.

No. 3 is the former headquarters of Kvindeligt Arbejderforbund, a labour union for women now part of Fagligt Fælles Forbund. It is from 1960 and was designed by Ole Buhl.
