= Johan Daniel Herholdt =

Danish architect, professor and royal building inspector

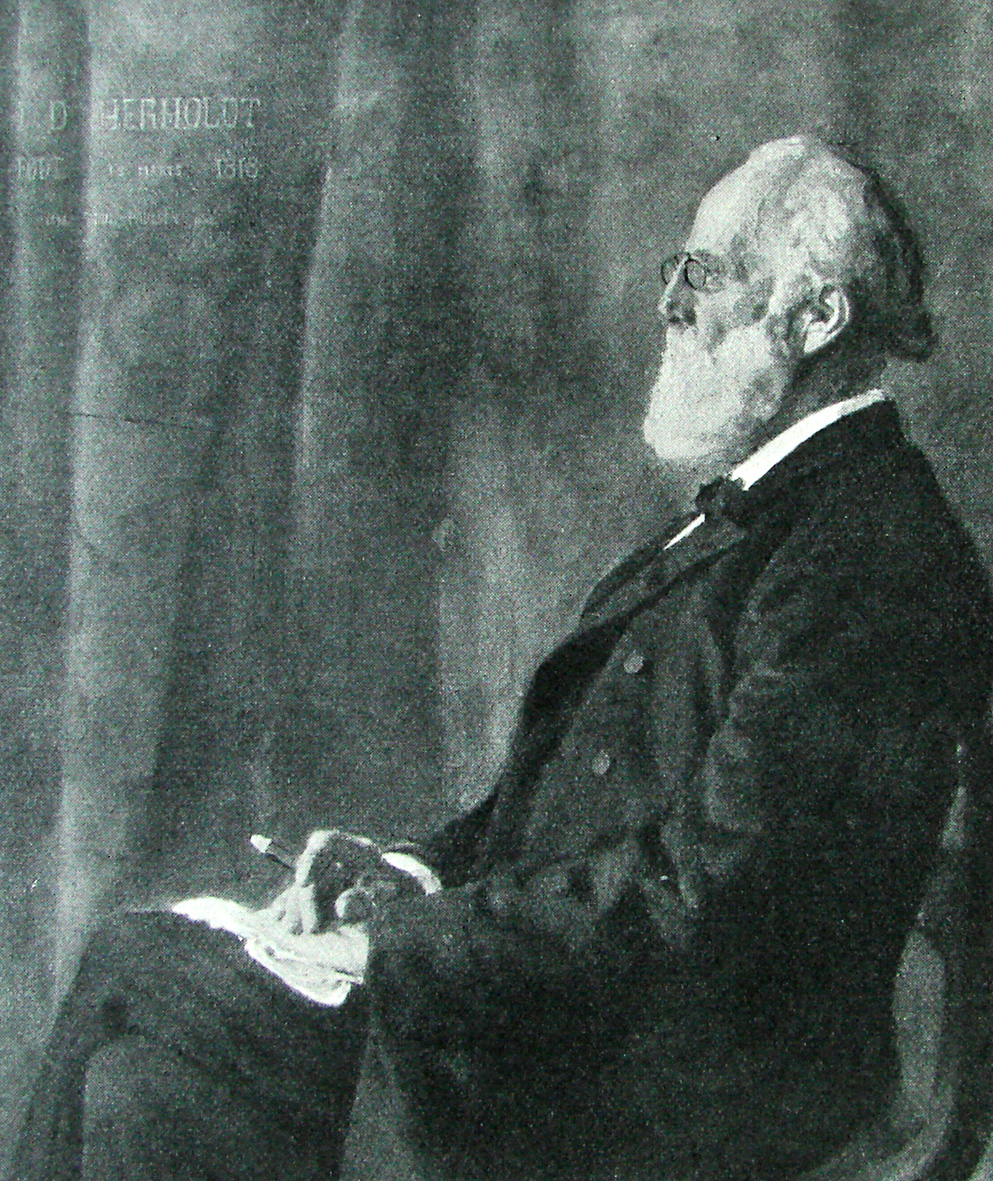
- Born: 13 August 1818; Slagelse, Denmark
- Died: 11 April 1902 (aged 83); Copenhagen, Denmark
- Occupation: Architect
- Buildings: Copenhagen University Library

Signature
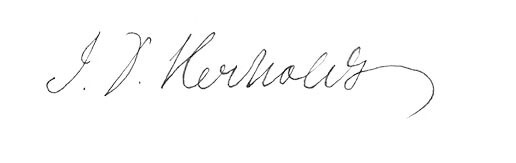

Johan Daniel Herholdt (13 August 1818 – 11 April 1902) was a Danish architect, professor and royal building inspector. He worked in the Historicist style and had a significant influence on Danish architecture during the second half of the 19th and the beginning of the 20th century. His most famous work is the Copenhagen University Library in Fiolstræde in Copenhagen which heralded a new trend. The strong use of red brick in large-scale cultural and civic buildings was to characterize Danish architecture for several decades. He was a leading proponent of the "national" school in Danish architecture of the period as opposed to Ferdinand Meldahl's and Vilhelm Dahlerup's "European" school.

== Early life and education ==
Johan Daniel Herholdt was born in 1818 in Copenhagen. He first trained and worked as a carpenter until 1840. In quiet months when work was scarce, he attended evening classes at the Royal Academy and took drawing lessons in the daytime, studying first under Gustav Hetsch and later Michael Gottlieb Bindesbøll. From 1841, he travelled in Denmark, Norway and Northern Germany, studying buildings and working along the way. In 1845, he returned to Copenhagen to complete his studies in architecture.

== Career ==
Herholdt's first assignments were mainly large villas and a few manor houses. His major breakthrough came when he won the first architectural competition of its kind in Denmark, for the design of a new building for the Copenhagen University Library. His winning Neo-Gothic design started a trend in Danish architecture which was typified by the strong use of red brick in large-scale cultural and civic buildings. It was to last for the next half century. His building was also the first in Denmark to rely on a structural system of cast iron. The library was completed in 1861 and the same year he became a member of the academy.

His later works include Copenhagen's second Central Station and a building for the National Bank of Denmark, both demolished, and Odense City Hall. He was responsible for the design of a building complex for the College of Advanced Technology where he also served as a teacher.

== Selected buildings ==
- Erholm Manor, Funen (1851–1854, listed)
- Selchausdal, Kalundborg (1856, listed)
- Copenhagen University Library, Fiolstræde, Copenhagen (1857–1861)
- Own Villa, 8 Ewaldsgade, Copenhagen (1858)
- P. C. Skovgaard House, Østerbro, Copenhagen (1869, listed)
- Villa for Johanne Luise Heiberg, Østerbro, Copenhagen (1862–1863, listed)
- Grøn's Department Store, Holmens Kanal, Copenhagen (1862–1863, listed)
- Enrum, Vedbæk (1862–1864, listed)
- 2nd Copenhagen Central Station (1862–1864, demolished in 1917)
- Levin House Havnegade, Copenhagen (1866, listed)
- Gyldenholm Manor, Slagelse (1863–64)
- National Bank of Denmark, Holmens Kanal, Copenhagen (1865–1870, demolished)
- Michael Rosings Minde (1983)
- Glasshouses, Gisselfeld (1876, rebuilt by Hans Jørgen Holm in 1894, listed)
- Odense City Hall, Odense (1881–1883)
- Bikuben Bank, Silkegade, Copenhagen (1883–1884, listed)
- Botanical Laboratory, Copenhagen Botanical Garden, 140 Godtersgade, Copenhagen (designed 1881–1883, built 1889–1890)
- College of Advanced Technology, Sølvgade, Copenhagen (1887–1890)
- Helsingør Custom House, Helsingør (1887–1891, listed)
- Næstved Custom House, Næstved (1887–1891)

== See also ==
- List of Danish architects
