= Fredensborg Palace =

Danish royal family's spring and autumn residence

- Fredensborg Slot
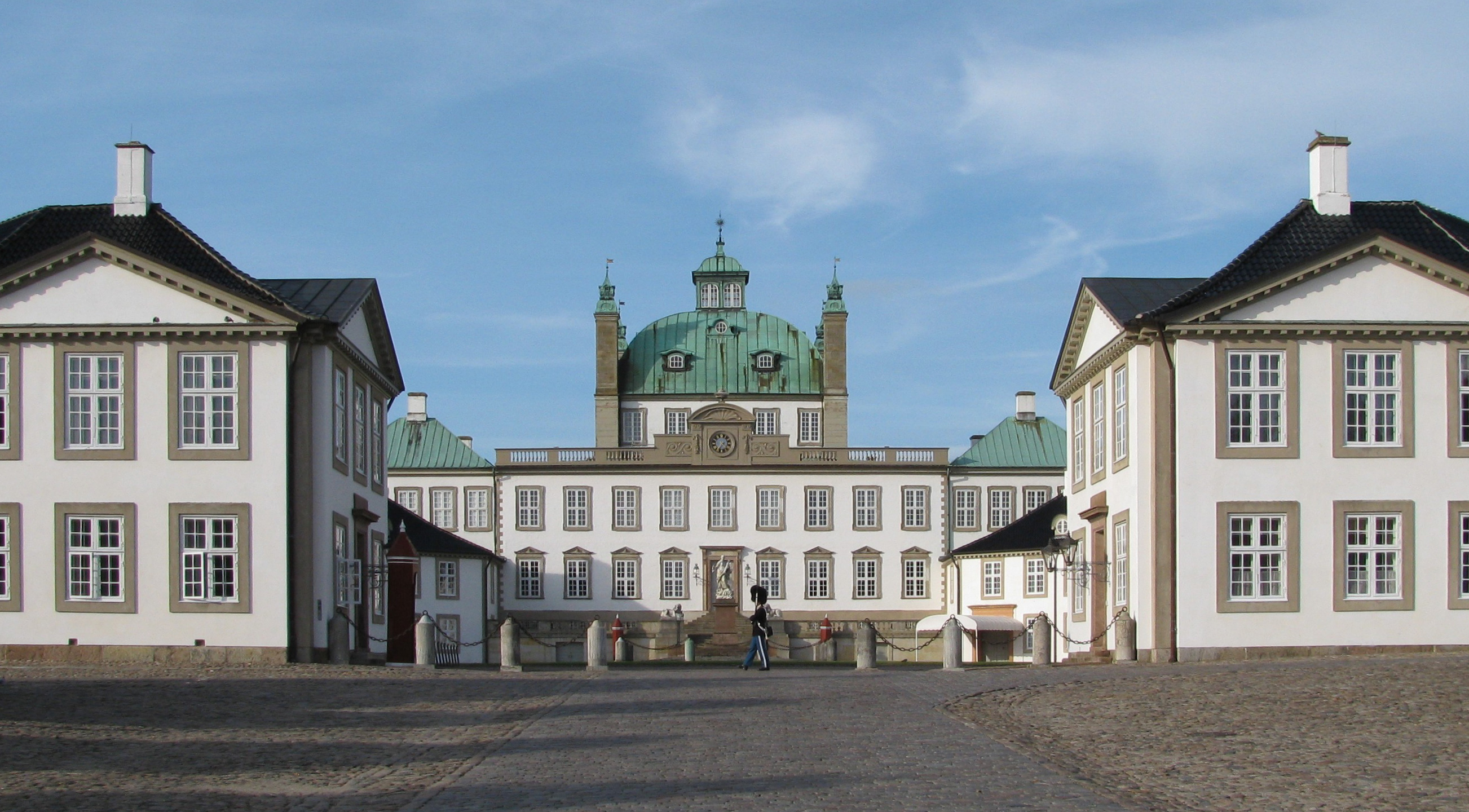
- Fredensborg Palace and its courtyard

General information
- Type: Palace
- Architectural style: Baroque, Dutch Baroque, Rococo
- Location: Fredensborg, Denmark
- Coordinates: 55°58′57″N 12°23′43″E
- Construction started: 1720
- Completed: 1753

Design and construction
- Architects: Johan Cornelius Krieger, Lauritz de Thurah, Nicolai Eigtved

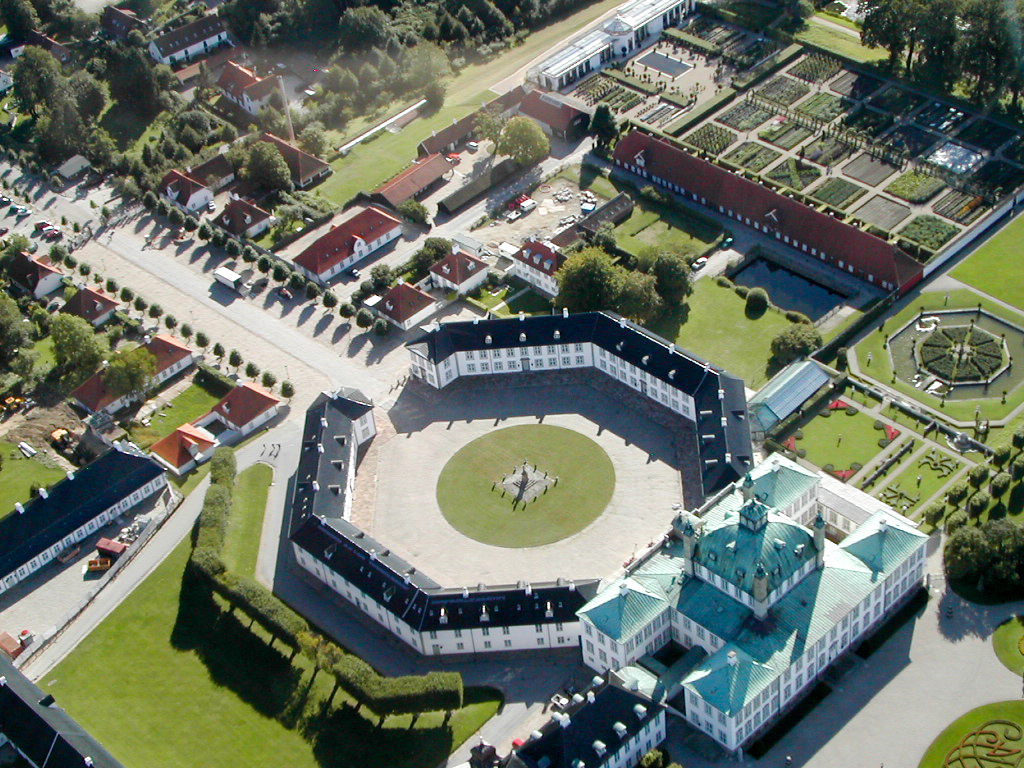
Aerial view of Fredensborg Palace

Fredensborg Palace (Danish: Fredensborg Slot; pronounced [ˈfʁeˀðn̩sˌpɒˀ ˈslʌt]) is a palace located on the eastern shore of Lake Esrum (Danish, Esrum Sø) in Fredensborg on the island of Zealand (Sjælland) in Denmark. It is the Danish royal family's spring and autumn residence, and is often the site of important state visits and events in the royal family. It is the most used of the royal family's residences.

== History ==
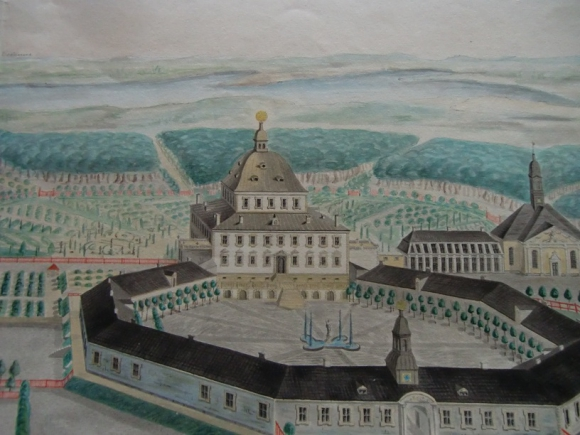
Fredensborg in 1728

At the end of the Great Northern War King Frederick IV asked architect Johan Cornelius Krieger, royal gardener to the court at Rosenborg Castle, to build him a small pleasure palace on the site of a farmyard named Østrup. Krieger built the French-inspired baroque palace 1720–1726, and the King himself took an active part in the planning of the building and grounds, and followed construction closely. The man responsible for the actual construction was General Building Master Johan Conrad Ernst, who was also responsible for the construction of Frederiksberg Palace.

While the building was still under construction Denmark–Norway and Sweden negotiated a peace treaty, which was signed on 3 July 1720, on the site of the unfinished palace. The treaty determined the fate of Skåne, which since that time has been a part of Sweden, and ended Denmark's eleven-year participation in the Great Northern War. To commemorate the signing of the peace accord the palace was named Fredens Borg (lit. "Peace's Castle").

The palace complex consisted of a small, almost square, 1 1/2-storey-high main palace with dome and lanterns. It is positioned exactly at the centre of what is known as a "hunting star" (Danish, jagtstjerne), a number of straight intersecting paths in a game hunting reserve. During a hunt it was permissible to shoot freely straight down the long paths, which radiated out from the centre. The dome hall measured 15 x 15 m (49 ft), and had a height of 27 m (89 ft). The sumptuous room featured stucco by C.E. Brenno and a plafond by Hendrick Krock.

In front of the main building was placed an octagonal courtyard encircled by the single-storey servants' wings, called Red Wing. It is the only red building at Fredensborg Palace, and it has open half-timbers under a red tile roof.

East of the octagon were the riding ring and the long stables building.

Further to the east and adjacent to the main palace was an Orangery and the one-storey building called Margrave House. The Orangery, which was equipped with huge glasshouse windows, was connected to the main building by a small secret passage, so that the royal family and the courtiers could walk to the chapel without getting their feet wet.

The palace chapel stood in the middle of the two buildings, and has an exaggerated copper spire, a pilaster-decorated façade facing the riding ring, and a heavily carved gable featuring a bust of Frederik IV in relief carved by Didrick Gercken.

On the other side of the church was the Courtiers Wing ("Kavalerfløj"), residences for the court's clerks and members of the royal household. This section of the palace was built from 1724 to 1726, and introduces elements of the Dutch Baroque style and Rococo.

The palace was extended throughout the early 18th century; however, the main structure of the palace has remained unchanged since its inauguration on 11 October 1722, the King's 51st birthday.

Krieger completed his work on the palace with the erection of the "new Court Chancery building" in 1731. The black-glazed tile, half-hipped roof building is now known as The Chancellery House. It butted up to the riding-ring on the southern edge.

A major alteration of Krieger's original building was made in 1741–1744 when Lauritz de Thurah, the King's favorite architect, elevated the roof of the palace's main building. The slanted roof was replaced by a flat one, and a characteristically de Thurah sandstone balustrade was erected. In 1751 he also transformed the Orangery into a residential building for the ladies-in-waiting.

In 1753 Nicolai Eigtved extended the palace by adding four symmetrically positioned corner pavilions with copper pyramid-shaped roofs to the main building.

== Royal residence ==
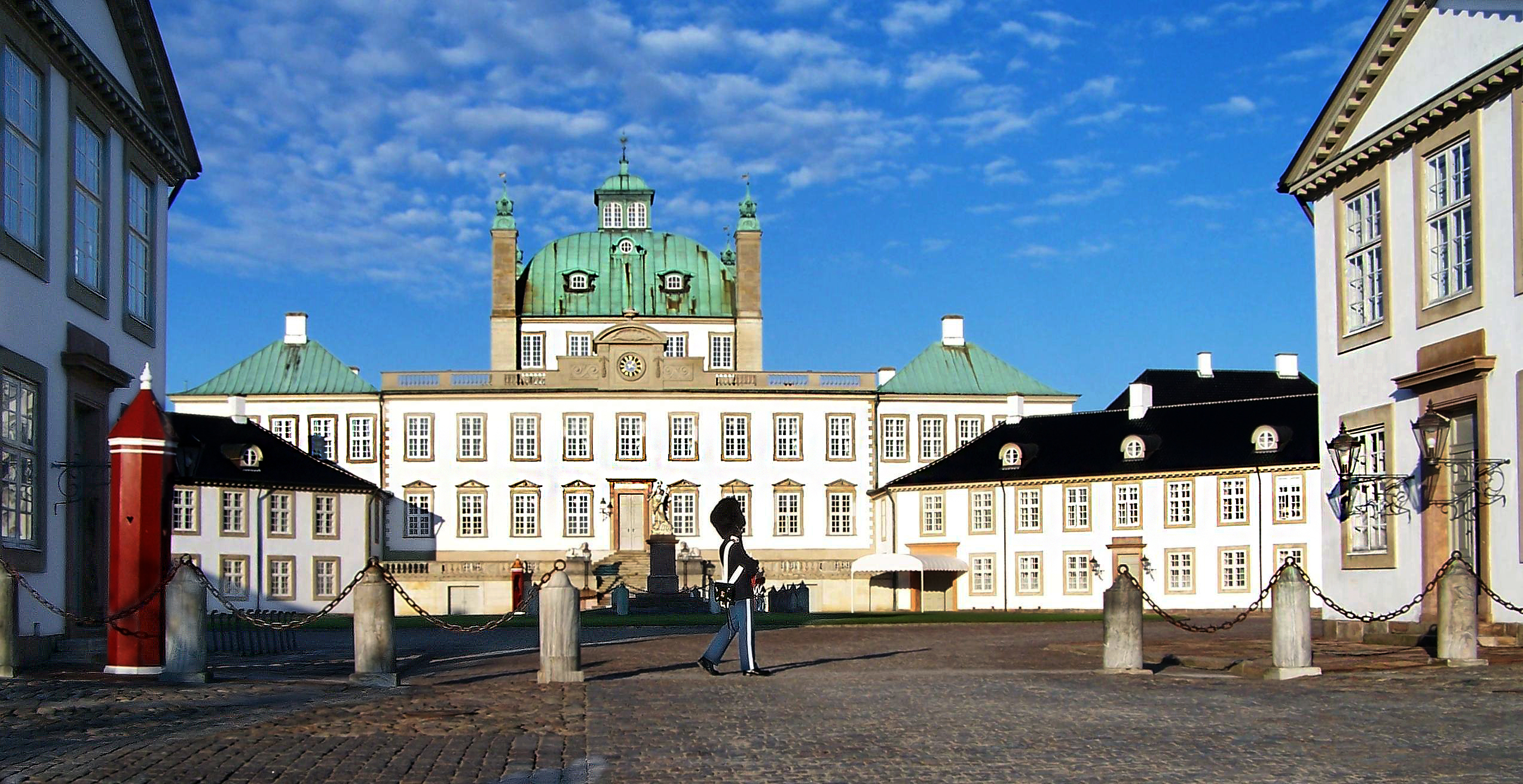
A soldier marching in front of the palace

In the 19th century, King Christian IX and Queen Louise (who counted Queen Alexandra of the United Kingdom, King George I of Greece and Empress Maria Feodorovna of Russia amongst their children) used Fredensborg to host annual family reunions. There, their grandchildren, including the future Tsar Nicholas II of Russia and Kings George V of the United Kingdom, Haakon VII of Norway, Constantine I of Greece, and Queen Maud of Norway, would play games in the park.

Queen Margrethe uses Fredensborg as a spring and autumn residence, and it is the usual venue for her birthday celebrations every April. The Queen's younger sister, Princess Benedikte, married HH Prince Richard of Sayn-Wittgenstein-Berleburg at the Chapel of Fredensborg Palace on 3 February 1968.

Until her death, the late Queen Mother, Queen Ingrid used the Chancellery House at Fredensborg as her private residence. The Chancellery House is now the summer residence of Frederik X and Queen Mary.

== The park and gardens ==
The palace gardens are among Denmark's largest historical gardens, and are Denmark's finest example of a Baroque garden. These too were designed by Krieger, and were extended and altered during the 18th century. The long, straight avenues which extend from the castle in a star-shaped pattern were recreated in the 1970s to 1990s. Between these avenues lies large wooded areas with winding paths. Most of the statues in the gardens were sculptured by Johannes Wiedewelt.

Of special interest is the "Valley of the Norsemen" (Danish: Nordmandsdalen) with approximately 70 sculptures of Norwegian and Faroese farmers and fishermen, originally carved by J.G. Grund. The garden is open all year round.

The area of the gardens closest to the palace is reserved for the royal family, but is usually open to the public in July. Here are the kitchen gardens, which supply fresh vegetables for the household, and a modern orangery, which was opened in 1995.

In 2021, after extensive restorations and redesign of the gardens, the Fredensborg Palace Garden was awarded the prestigious European Union Prize for Cultural Heritage by the international cultural heritage association, Europa Nostra Award. The jury noted that the Garden was an "exemplary redesign (...) and the combination of public and private funding for a public garden is a positive example for other similar heritage gardens".

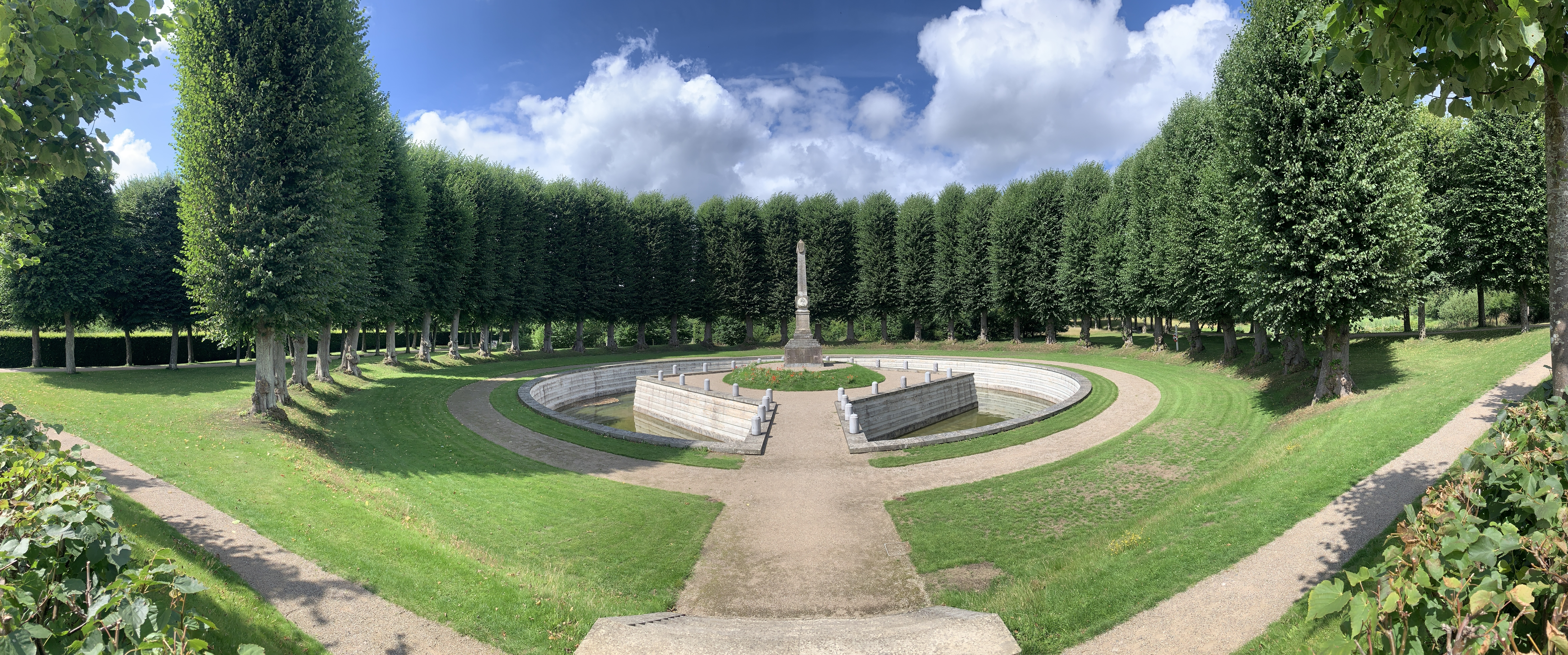
Panorama of Ballonpladsen in the Fredensborg Palace Gardens.
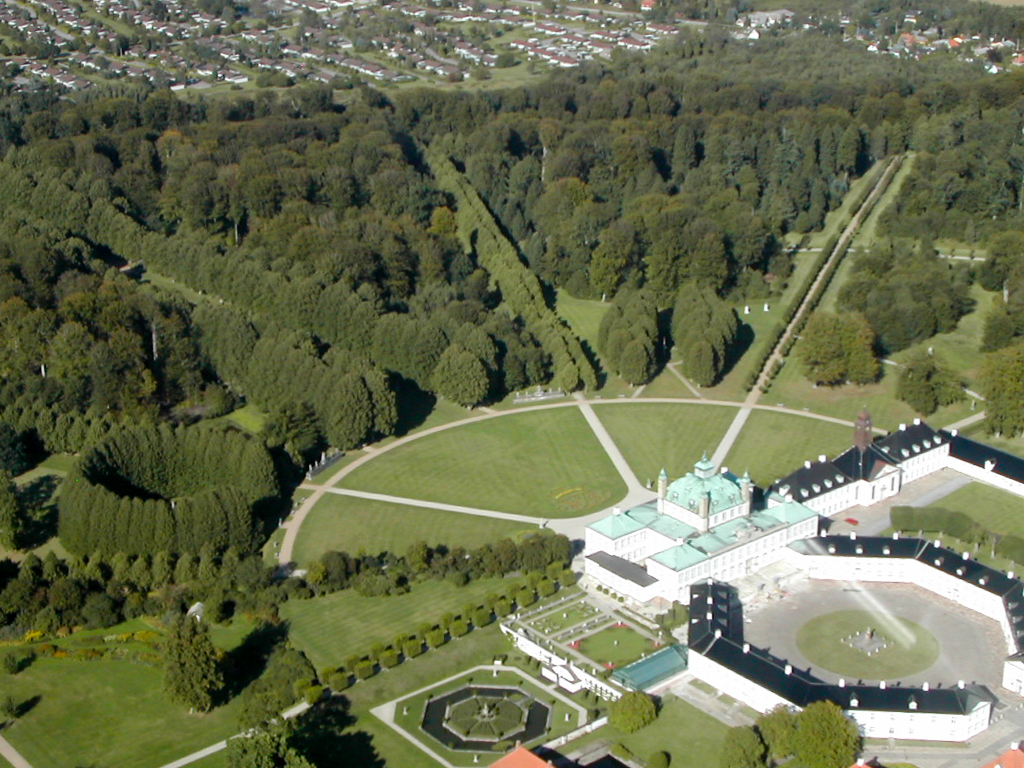
Aerial view of the palace and surrounding gardens

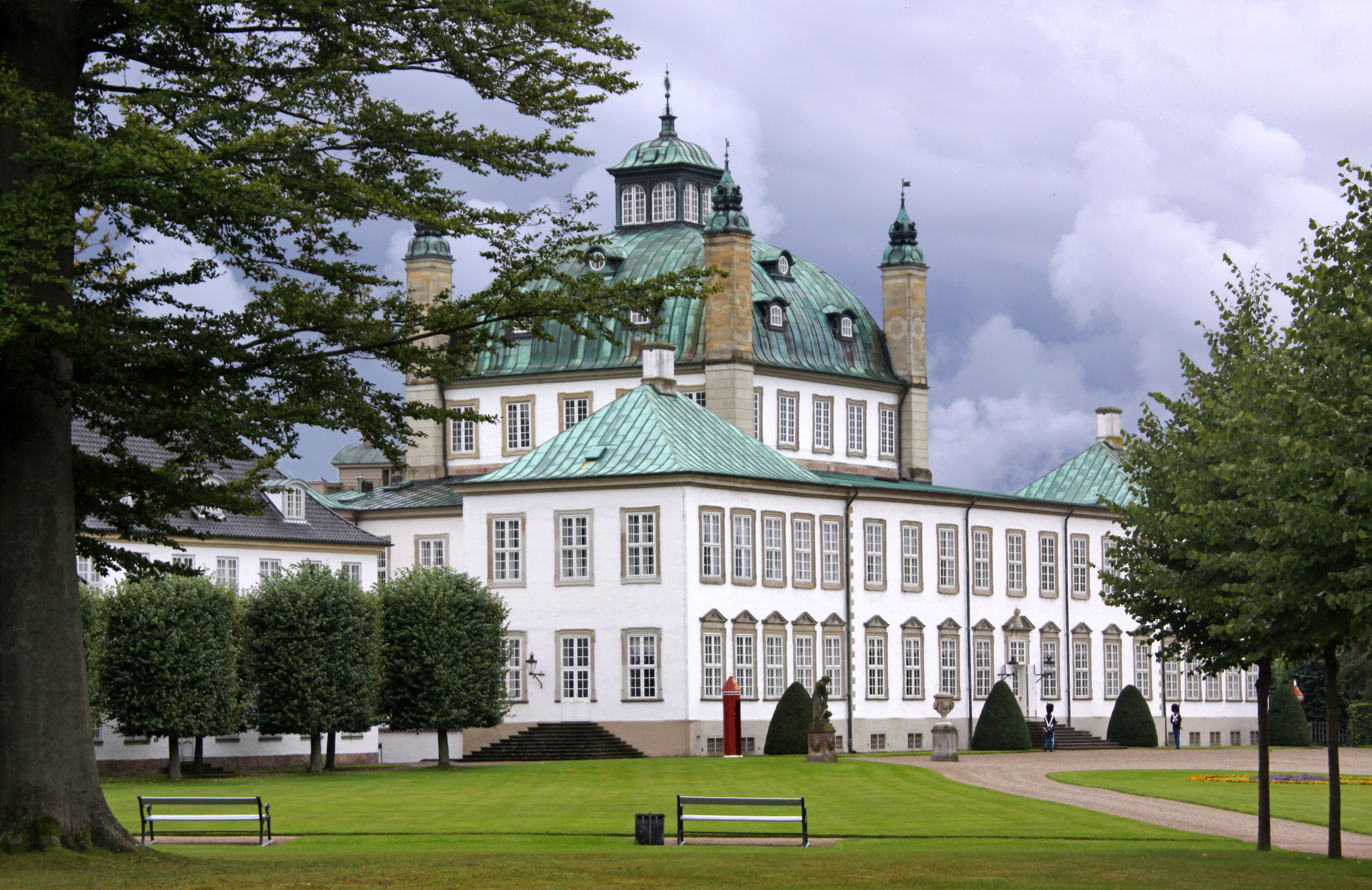
A view of the palace from the garden

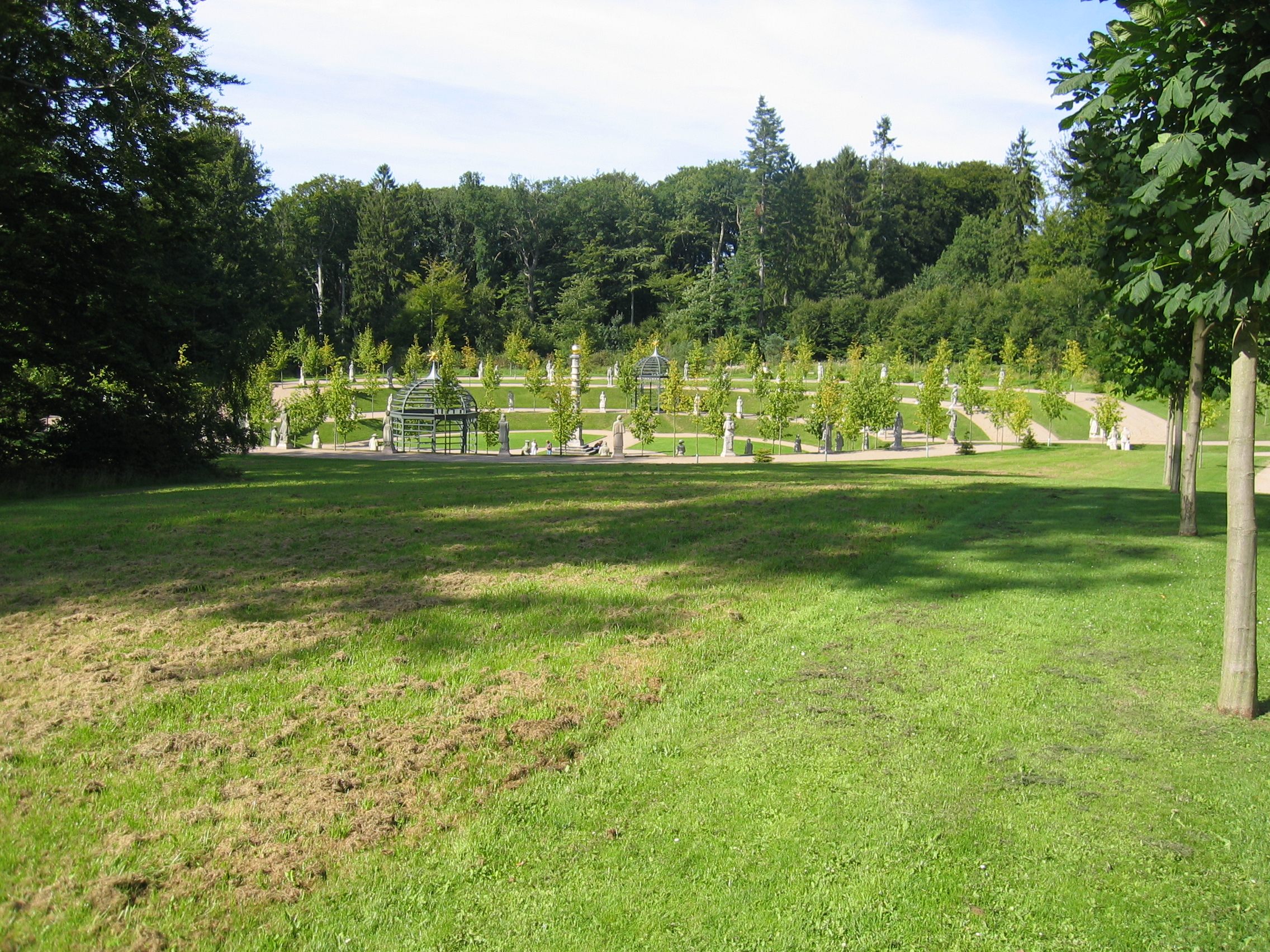
Sculptures in the Valley of the Norsemen

== Surrounding forests ==
Two of the forests in the surrounding area, Gribskov and Store Dyrehave, were developed in the 1680s under King Christian V for par force hunting with a mathematically designed system of access roads. They have now been included in the UNESCO World Heritage List under Par force hunting landscape in North Zealand.

== See also ==
- Johann Gottfried Grund
- List of Baroque residences
- List of castles and palaces in Denmark
- Tourism in Denmark

=== Namesakes ===
- Fort Fredensborg
- Fredensborg (slave ship)
