= Sjællandsgade =

Street in Copenhagen Municipality, Denmark

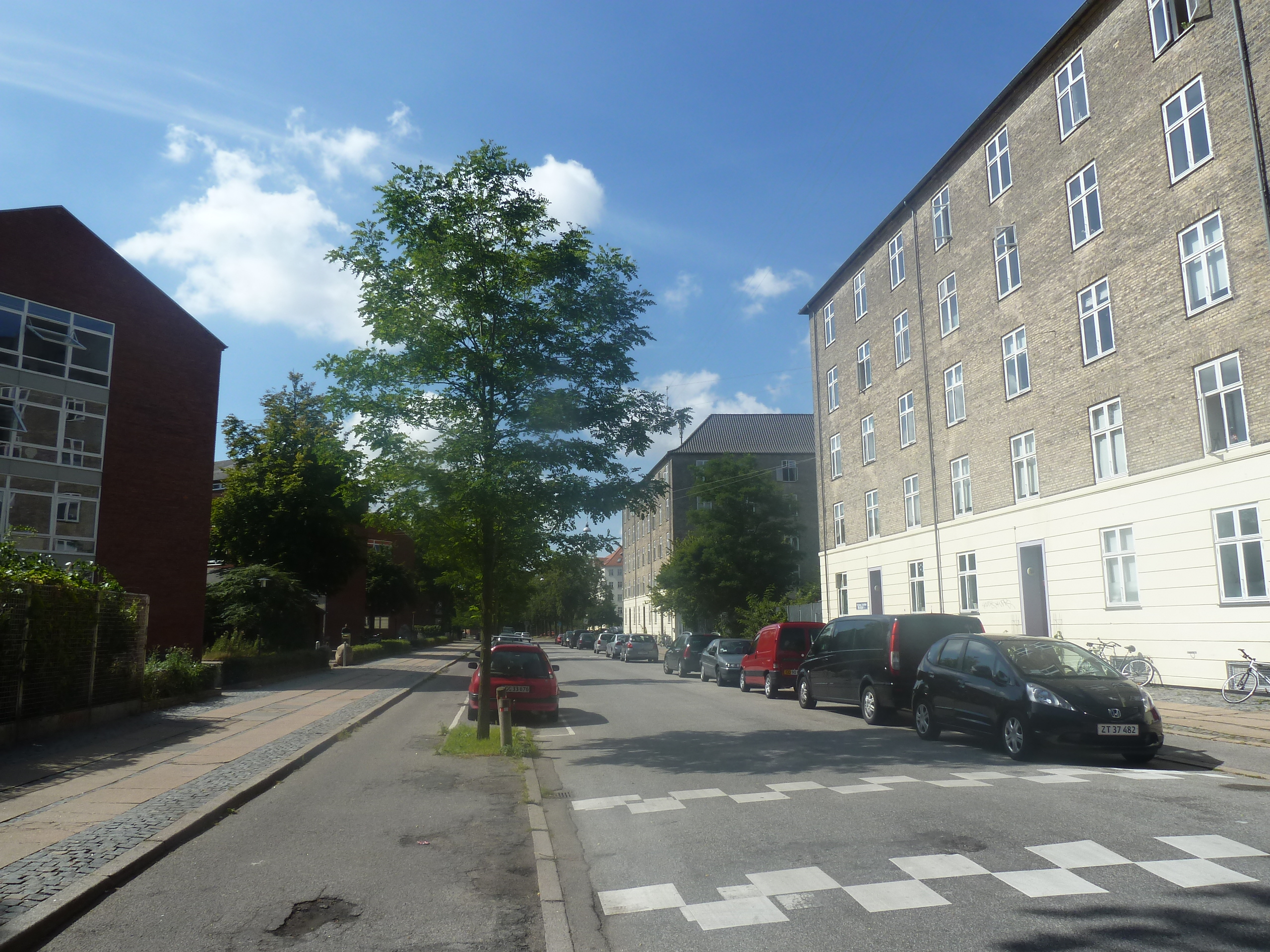
- Length: 726 m (2,382 ft)
- Location: Copenhagen, Denmark
- Quarter: Nørrebro
- Postal code: 2200
- Nearest metro station: Nørrebros Runddel
- Coordinates: 55°41′42.7″N 12°33′21.13″E
- Southwest end: Nørrebrogade
- Northeast end: Tagensvej

Sjællandsgade (lit. 'Zealand Street') is a street in the Nørrebro district of Copenhagen, Denmark. It runs from Nørrebrogade in the southwest to Tagensvej in the northeast. A short section of the street, between Prinsesse Charlottes Gade and Stevnsgade, has been closed to traffic and is now also known as Guldberg Byplads. It is surrounded by one of two branches of Guldberg School (formerly Sjællandsgade School), Simeon's Church and Sjællandsgade Public Baths. The last part of the street follows the northwest side of De Gamles By.

== History ==
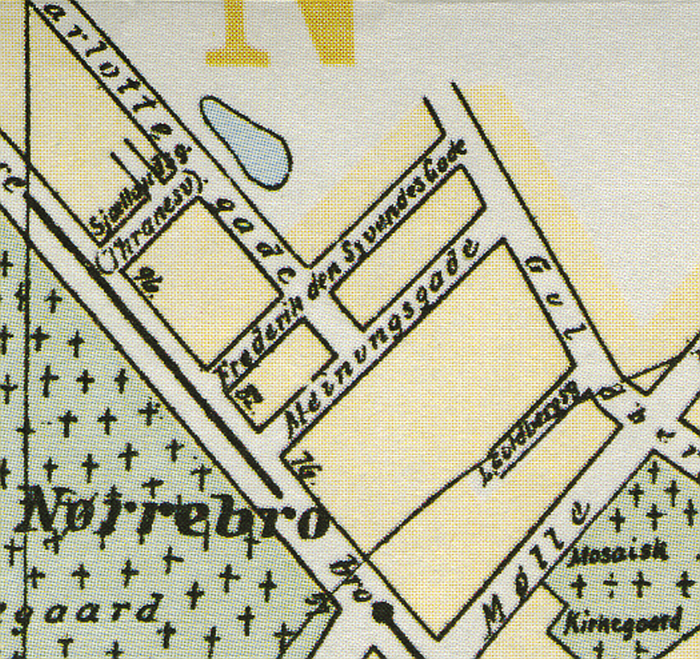
Sjællandsgade, still just a short street, seen on a map detail

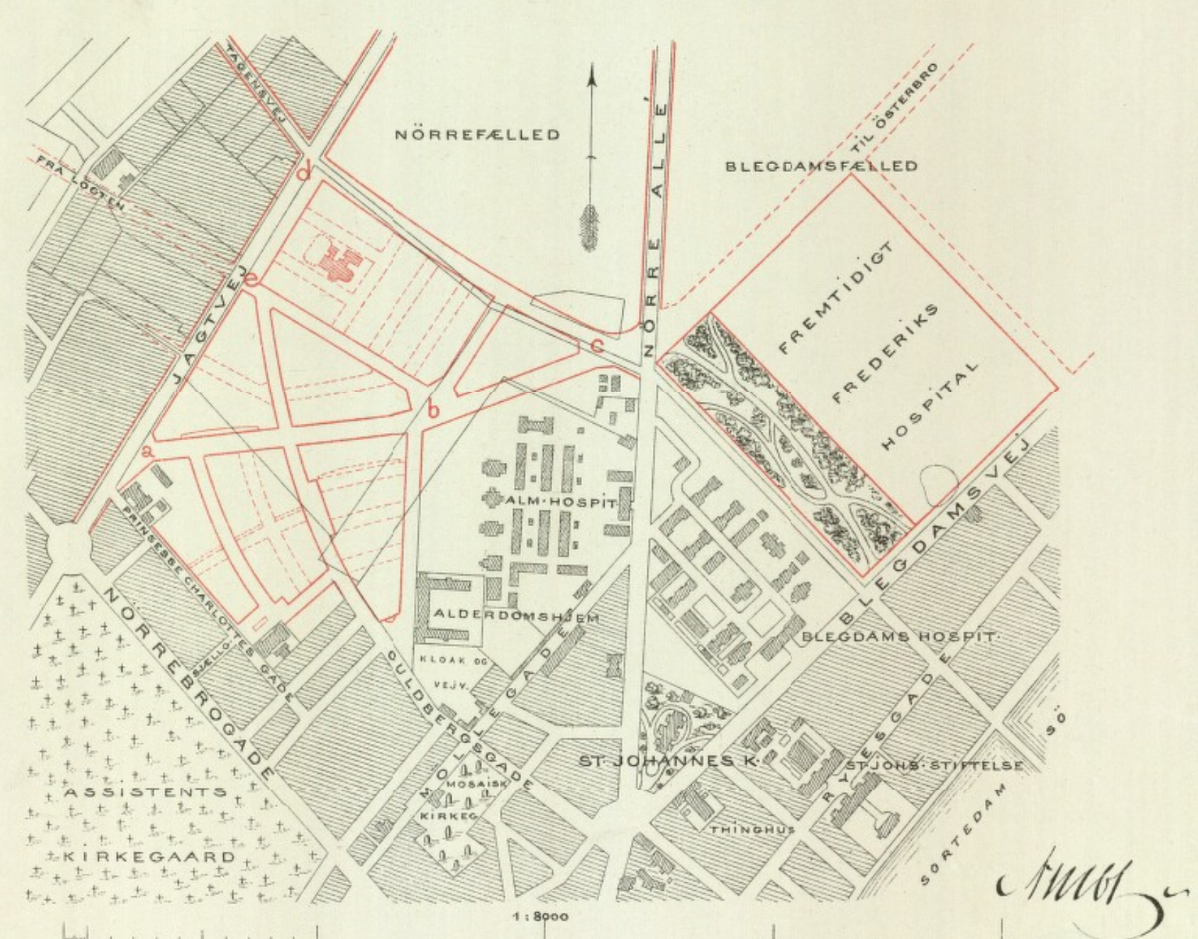
Charles Ambt's masterplan for the area between Prinsesse Charlottes Gade and Tagensvej, 1899

The oldest section of the street, between Nørrebrogade and Prinsesse Charlottes Gade, was initially called Thranesvej after merchant L. E. Thrane who owned a property at the site.

The name of the street was in 1885 changed to Sjællandsgade. City engineer Charles Ambt created a masterplan for redevelopment of the area east of Prinsesse Charlottes Gade in 1899. Sjællandsgade was then over the next decade in stages extended to Tagensvej.

== Notable buildings ==
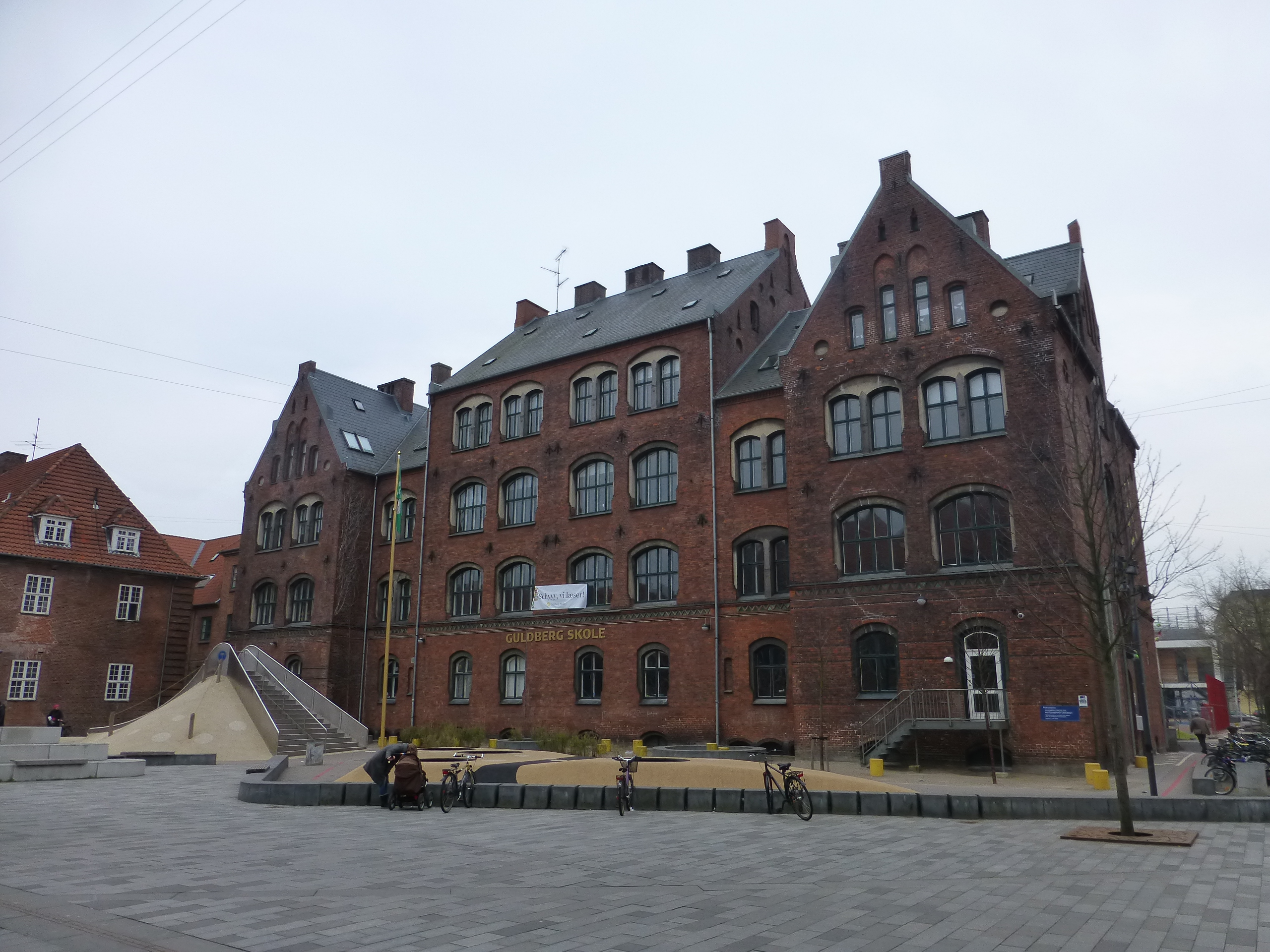
No. 12: Guldberg School

Sjællandsgade School is from 1887 and was designed by Hans Jørgen Holm. The school was in 1921 extended by city architect Hans Wright. Sjællandsgade School was in 2006 merged with Stevnsgade School under the name Guldberg School.

Simeon's Church (No. 12B) is a Church of Denmark parish church. It was constructed in 1913–14 to designs by Johannes Magdahl Nielsen.

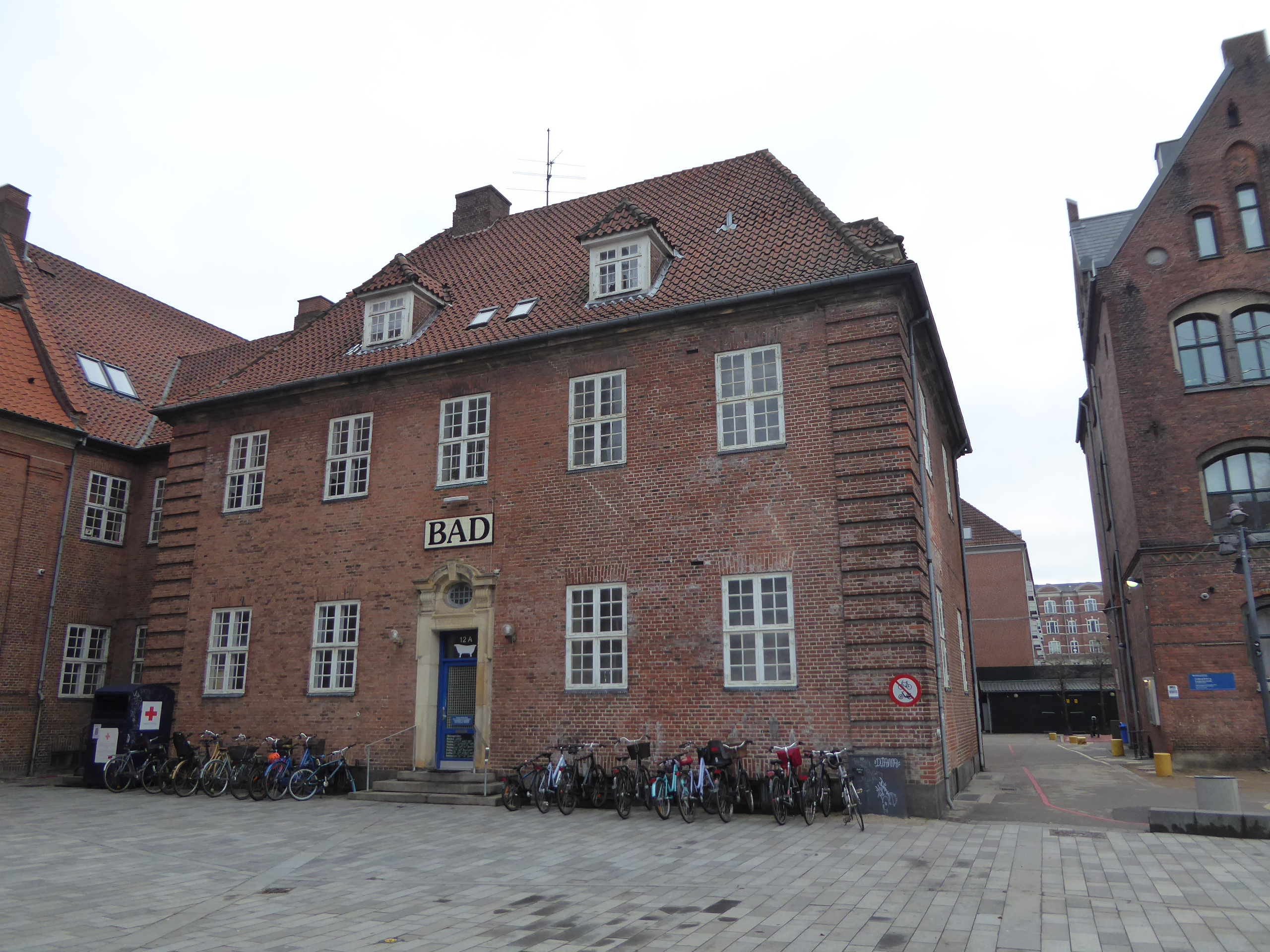
No. 12A: Sjællandsgade Public Baths

Sjællandsgade Public Baths (No. 12 A) is attached to the church. It opened in 1917 as one of several new public bath houses in the city but closed when private bathrooms had become common later in the century. The Baroque Revival style building by city architect Hans Wright was listed on the Danish registry of protected buildings and places in 2013. The bath house was shortly thereafter reopened by a group of volunteers.

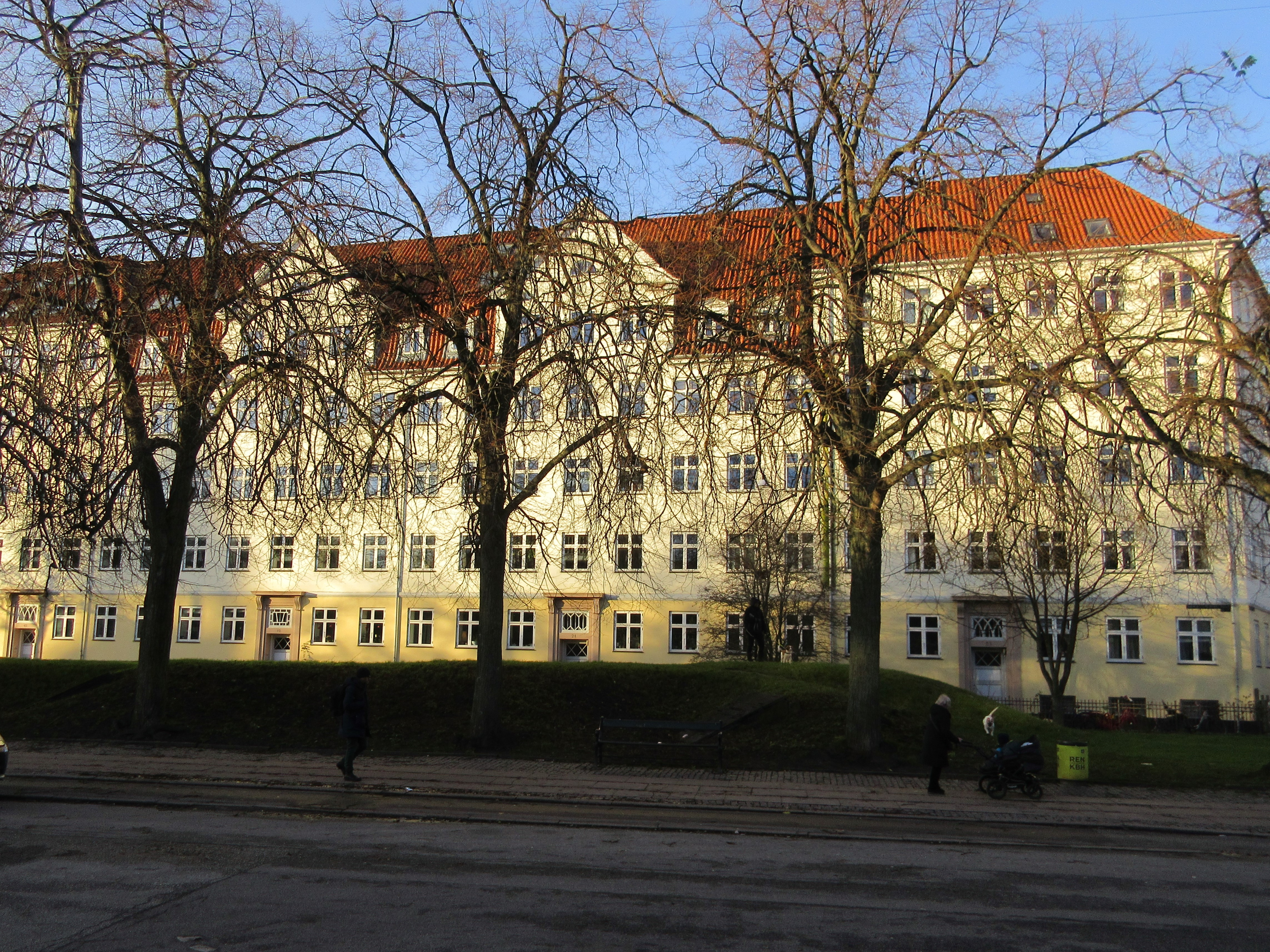
No. 16-21

The section from Guldbergsgade to Tagensvej follows the northwestern boundary of De Gamles By. Copenhagen Health and Care Services (Sundheds- og Omsorgsforvaltningen) is based at No. 40.

The buildings on the other side of the street are mainly apartment blocks from the 1920s. The apartment block at No. 9-13 was built for ABB to designs by Johannes Strøm Tejsen in 1917–18. The block at No. 15 is from 1918 to 1919 and was designed by Christian Mandrup-Poulsen. No. 17-21 is from 1921 and was designed by Einar Ambt and Axel Preisler.

== Public art ==
In front of Copenhagen Health and Care Services' building at No. 40 stands a granite sculpture, Guldskat (Treasure of Gold), created by Ejgil Westergaard and installed at the site in 1990. The sculpture is inspired by a Hans Christian Andersen story by the same name.

== Transport ==
The nearest Copenhagen Metro station is Nørrebros Runddel. The beginning of the street is located approximately 250 metres from the station. The far end of the street is located approximately 860 metres from the station by way of Fensmarksgade.
