= Copenhagen Business Academy =

Former higher education institution in Denmark

- Other name: Cphbusiness
- Type: State-funded, self-governing higher education institution
- Active: 1 September 2008–30 June 2025
- Last rector: Ole Gram-Olesen
- Students: Approximately 5,800 full-time students (2022)
- Location: Copenhagen, Denmark
- Website: ek.dk (successor institution)

Copenhagen Business Academy, also known as Cphbusiness, was a Danish institution of higher education with campuses in the Capital Region of Denmark. It was a state-funded, self-governing education and research institution under the Danish Ministry of Higher Education and Science. Its provision included Academy Profession and professional bachelor's degree programmes, alongside part-time continuing education.

On 1 July 2025, Cphbusiness merged with KEA – Copenhagen School of Design and Technology to form Business Academy Copenhagen (Danish: Erhvervsakademi København), abbreviated EK.

== History ==
Copenhagen Business Academy was formally established on 1 September 2008. Initially, the academy had overall administrative responsibility, while individual higher education programmes remained with four partner institutions: Niels Brock Copenhagen Business College, Hotel- og Restaurantskolen, Handelsskolen København Nord and Erhvervsskolen Nordsjælland. In summer 2012, the programmes were transferred organisationally and financially to Cphbusiness, which assumed full responsibility for their delivery.

The academy's strategic framework agreement for 2022–2025 reported approximately 5,800 full-time students. Its responsibilities included professionally oriented higher education and applied research and development in business and technical subjects.

Ministerial approval for the merger of Cphbusiness and KEA was announced in November 2024. Both institutions were dissolved on 30 June 2025, and their successor institution was established the following day. Existing programmes continued at EK. Ole Gram-Olesen, the former rector of Cphbusiness, became prorector of the merged institution.

== Campuses ==
Cphbusiness operated in Copenhagen, Kongens Lyngby, Hillerød and Rønne on Bornholm.

=== Cphbusiness City ===
Cphbusiness City was located at Landemærket 11 in central Copenhagen and housed programmes in finance. It also served as the academy's headquarters earlier in its history. The building was constructed in 1939–1940 for De Forenede Protokolfabrikker A/S, to designs by William Jerndorff.

=== Cphbusiness Nørrebro ===
The Nørrebro campus was located in Blågårdsgade. In its 2022 annual report, the academy announced its decision to close this location from summer 2023 and transfer its activities to Cphbusiness Søerne.

=== Cphbusiness Søerne ===
Cphbusiness Søerne was located at Nansensgade 19, near the Lakes. The campus was developed to accommodate programmes in sales and marketing, management and communication, together with part-time academy and diploma programmes. The academy's 2024 annual report listed Nansensgade 19 as its institutional address.

=== Cphbusiness Lyngby ===
Cphbusiness operated a campus in Kongens Lyngby, north of Copenhagen. Premises at Nørgaardsvej 30 were officially inaugurated in September 2013. In 2023, the academy moved into new premises on Firskovvej.

=== Cphbusiness Hillerød ===
In Hillerød, the academy offered laboratory and environmental technology programmes at Peder Oxes Allé. A separate location in the SlotsArkaderne shopping centre, opened in early 2021, offered business and finance programmes.

=== Cphbusiness Bornholm ===
The academy also provided higher education in Rønne on the island of Bornholm.

== Programmes ==
Cphbusiness offered programmes in fields including business and finance, sales and marketing, information technology, innovation, management, communication, services, laboratory science and environmental technology.

=== Academy Profession degrees ===
The academy offered Academy Profession degree programmes, including computer science, marketing management, financial management, multimedia design and service management.

Within the Danish higher education system, most Academy Profession programmes involve two years of study, equivalent to 120 ECTS credits, and combine theoretical study with practical training and a work placement.

=== Professional bachelor's degrees ===
The academy's professional bachelor's programmes included:

- Finance
- Innovation and Entrepreneurship
- International Hospitality Management
- International Sales and Marketing
- Software Development
- Sport Management
- Web Development

In some fields, professional bachelor's programmes were offered as top-up degrees following a relevant Academy Profession qualification. These top-up programmes normally involved a further 90 ECTS credits, equivalent to one and a half years of full-time study.

=== Continuing education ===
Cphbusiness also offered part-time academy and diploma programmes for continuing professional education. Subjects included management, communication, financial advice, information technology, international trade, transport and logistics.

== See also ==
- KEA – Copenhagen School of Design and Technology
- Zealand Institute of Business and Technology
