= Business Academy Aarhus =

Danish academy for undergraduate business and technology degrees

- Erhvervsakademi Aarhus
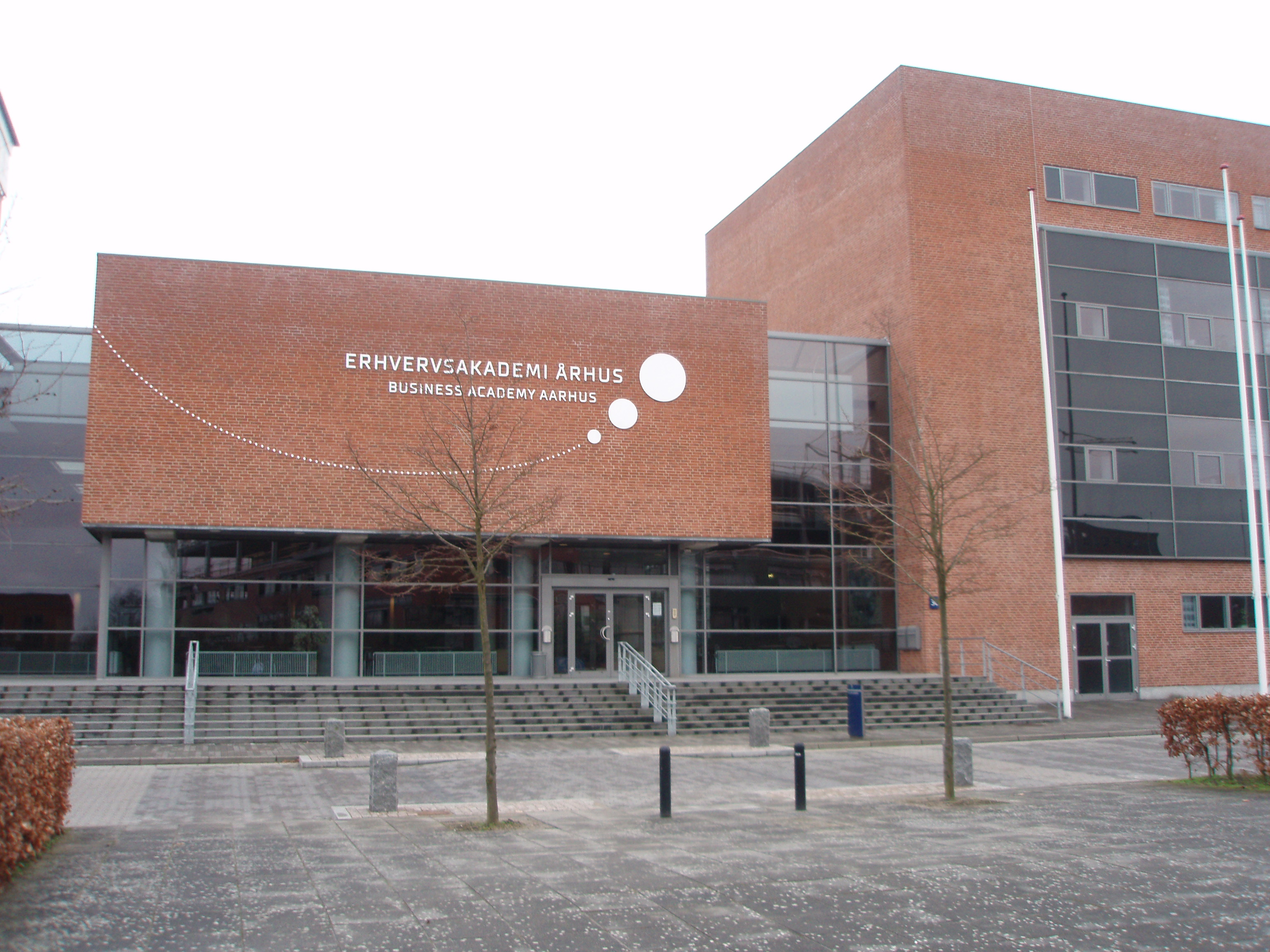
- Business Academy Aarhus
- Type: University of Applied Sciences
- Established: 2009; 17 years ago
- Rector: Anne Storm Rasmussen
- Academic staff: 325
- Administrative staff: 75
- Students: 5000 full-time 5000 part-time
- Location: Aarhus, Denmark; 56.119557°N 10.158814°E
- Website: http://www.baaa.dk/

Business Academy Aarhus is a school of higher education in Aarhus, Denmark founded on 1 January 2009. The academy is an independent self-owning institution subordinated to the Ministry of Science, Innovation and Higher Education. Degree programmes offered are mainly applied degrees, especially in technology, IT and business. The academy grants undergraduate and academic degrees but not master's or doctoral degrees. In addition to full-time studies the academy offers supplemental education, part-time programmes at bachelor's level and short-term courses for people who need to strengthen their qualifications. The academy is one of the largest business academies in Denmark.

The academy has 5,000 full-time students including 600 international students and 5,000 part-time students and about 400 employees.

== Programmes ==
=== Academy Profession Degree Programme ===
An Academy Profession (AP) degree is an undergraduate academic degree. This comprehensive 2-2½ year programme is similar to the first two years of a bachelor's degree and awards 120 ECTS.

- Automation Engineering (Automationsteknolog)
- Automotive Technology (Autoteknolog)
- Chemical and Biotechnical Science (Laborant)
- Construction and Business (Byggekoordinator)
- Computer Science (Datamatiker)
- Financial Controlling (Financial Controller)
- Financial Management (Finansøkonom)
- IT Technology (IT-teknolog)
- Marketing Management (Markedsføringsøkonom)
- Production Technology (Produktionsteknolog)
- Service, Hospitality and Tourism Management (Serviceøkonom)
- Multimedia Design (Multimediedesigner)

=== Bachelor's degrees ===
Bachelor's programmes A full bachelor's degree programme lasts for 3½ years. Students earn 210 ECTS for a full programme.

Bachelor's top-up programmes On completion of an AP degree (or similar from abroad), it is possible to take another 1½ years of full-time studies and be awarded 90 ECTS. An AP degree programme combined with the Bachelor's top-up programme is equivalent to a full bachelor's degree.

- Chemical and Biotechnical Technology and Food Technology
- Financial Management and Services
- International Sales and Marketing
- Innovation and Entrepreneurship
- Product Development and Integrative Technology
- Software Development
- Web Development
- Business Economics and Information Technology
- Digital Concept Development
