= Dania Academy =

Business and technology education institution in Denmark

The Danish Academy of Business and Technology (Danish: Erhvervsakademi Dania), usually referred to as Dania, is a business academy with eight campuses in Denmark. The academy is a state-funded institution subordinated to the Ministry of Higher Education and Science. Undergraduate applied degrees as well as preparation and qualification courses can be studied at the academy (short-term). There are 2500 full-time students, around 3000 part-time students and 200 employees.

== Campuses ==
Dania currently consists of seven campuses in Jutland; two of the seven campuses are international, located in Viborg and Randers. The campus located in Randers is also the main campus, where the rectorate as well as most of the administrative staff are located. Other campuses are located in Grenaa, Silkeborg, Horsens, Skive and Hobro.

== Programmes ==
=== Academy profession programmes (AP Degrees) ===
Academy profession programmes are undergraduate applied science programmes normally awarded after 120 ECTS-points, equalling the two first years of a bachelor's degree. The main subject areas taught at Dania Academy Denmark are IT, business, tourism, and technology.

=== Bachelor top-up programmes ===
Bachelor top-up programme duration is 1½ years and is aimed at students who have already completed an AP degree programme or similar.

By completing both an AP degree programme and the top-up programme, students obtain a Bachelor's degree.

- BA in International Hospitality Management
- BA in Optometry
- BA in Data Analytics

All English-taught programmes at Dania were shut down by the government in June 2021.
