= Meinungsgade =

Street in Copenhagen Municipality, Denmark

Meinungsgade is a street in the Nørrebro district of Copenhagen, Denmark, linking Nørrebrogade in the southwest with Guldbergsgade in the northeast.

== History ==
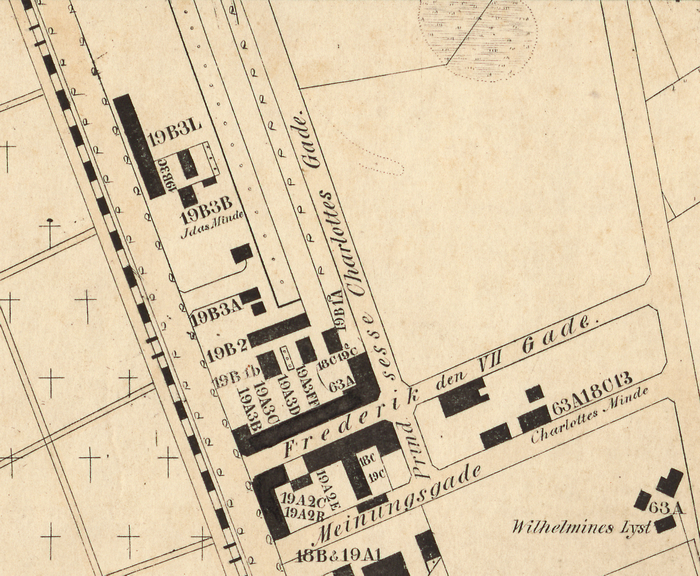
Meinungsgade seen on a map detail from circa 1860. Vilhelmines Lyst is seen in the bottom right corner

Meinungsgade takes its name from captain Conrad Robertus Meinung (1805–1873) who owned a country house named Vilhelmines Lyst at the site. In circa 1859, he constructed the road and started to sell the land off in lots. As something new, Meinung constructed workers' housing with cavity walls. The method received an award on the Exposition Universelle in Paris.

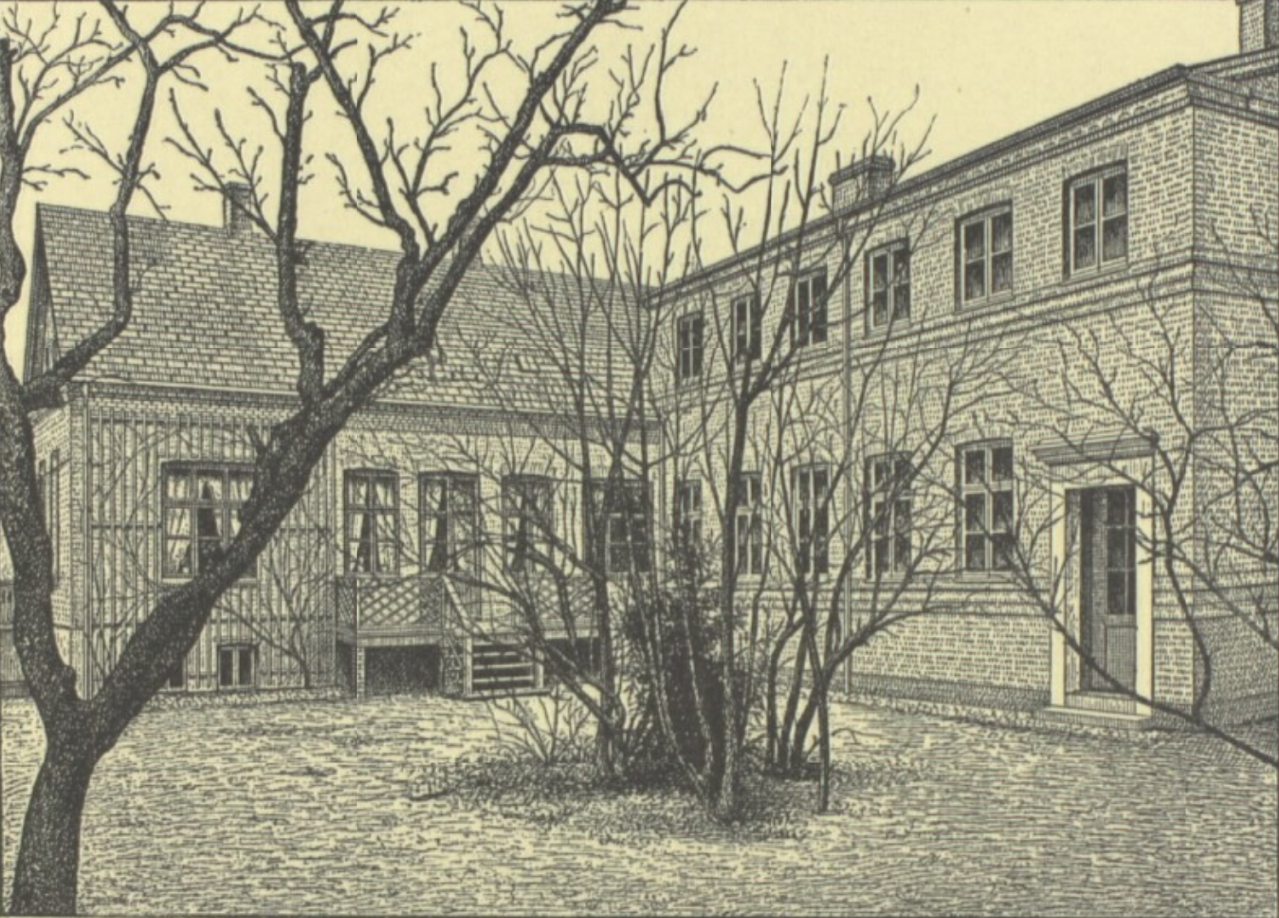
The institution for intellectually disabled deaf mutes

Rudolph Koefod var had already constructed a factory at the site in 1857. H. Rudolph Koefoed & Co. was later merged with another machine factory under the name Koefod & Hauberg. Another industrial enterprise, Smith & Mtgind, later FLSmidth, was founded in 1872 founded in a former stable between Meinungsgade and Møllegade. It was after a few months replaced by a machine factory. Koefod & Hauberg relocated to Tagensvej after being merged with Marstrand, Helweg & Co. under the name Titan A/S in 1897. The factory in Meinungsgade was then rented out to A/S Kjøbenhavns Cykelfabrik.

An institution for intellectually disabled deaf-mute people was until 1894 based in the street.

== Notable buildings ==
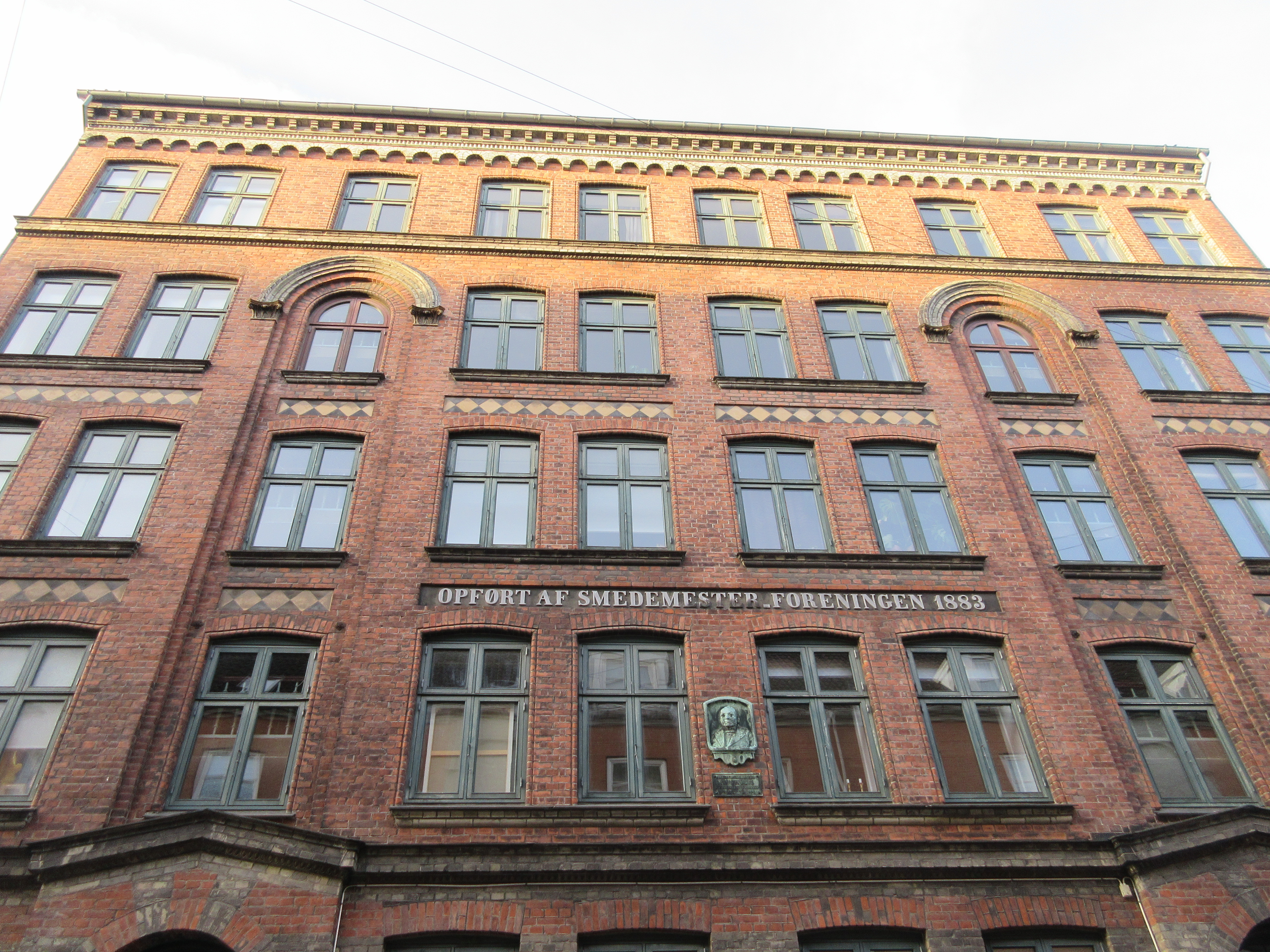
No. 17: Smedemesterforeningens Stiftelse

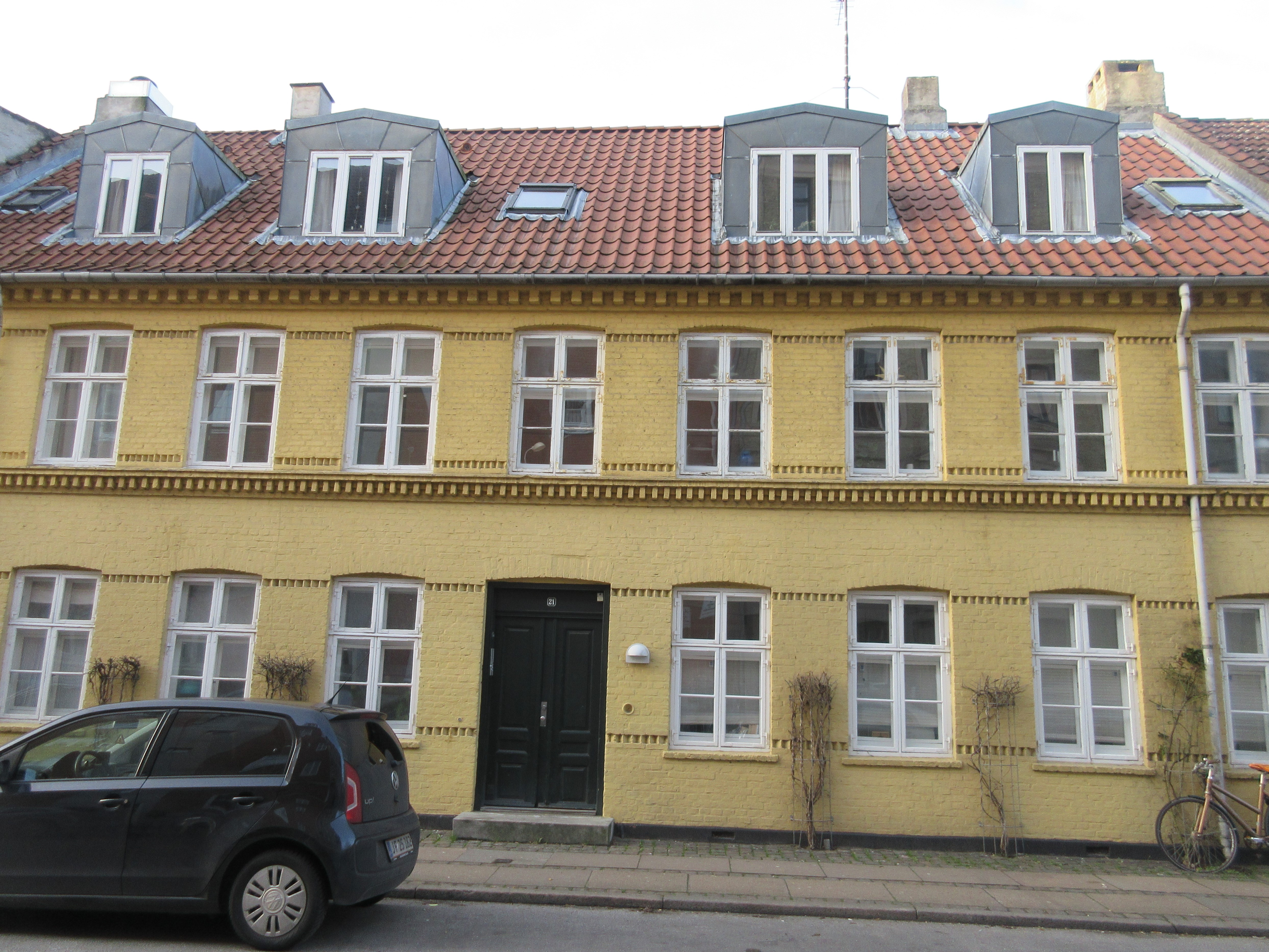
Meinungsgade 21

Smedeforeningens Stiftelse/No. 17 is from 1883 and was built to provide affordable housing for master smiths in difficult circumstances. The facade features a plaque with a bronze relief portrait of the association's president, A. W. Holm, an anchor smith.

The two long, low houses at No. 19 and No. 21 date from 1868.

== Transport ==
The nearest Copenhagen Metro station is Nørrebros Runddel.
