= Zealand Academy of Technologies and Business =

Danish college

Zealand Institute of Technologies and Business
- Sjællands Erhvervsakademi
- Type: University of Applied Sciences
- Established: 2008; 18 years ago
- Principal: Rasmus Frimodt
- Administrative staff: +240
- Students: 3200
- Location: Copenhagen, Denmark
- Website: http://www.zealand.dk

Zealand Institute of Technologies and Business (Danish: Sjællands Erhvervsakademi, EASJ) or Zealand is a school of higher education established in 2008 due to a merger of nine Danish Colleges, most dating back more than 100 years. It is regularly ranked within the top 4 business academies in Denmark.

Zealand operates six campuses in Region Zealand to the west and south of Copenhagen, Denmark. The campuses, with a total of some 3,200 students, are located in Næstved, Roskilde, Køge, Slagelse, Holbæk and Nykøbing Falster. The school is an independent self-owning institution subordinated to the Ministry of Science, Innovation and Higher Education.

Degree programs offered are mainly applied degrees, especially in technology, IT, and business. The academy grants undergraduate and academic degrees but not master's or doctoral degrees. In addition to full-time studies, the academy offers supplemental education, part-time programs at bachelor's level, and short-term courses for people who need to strengthen their qualifications.

== History ==
The Zealand Institute of Technologies and Business was founded in 2008 and initially offered higher education programs in cooperation with nine different vocational schools in Region Zealand. As of August 2012, these higher education programs were officially transferred from the nine schools to the administration of Zealand. The number of students has almost doubled since then

== Campuses and programmes ==
=== Campus Roskilde ===
Campus Roskilde currently occupy four different locations across Roskilde, and offers the following programmes:

- Marketing Management
- Computer Science
- International Sales and Marketing Management
- Web Development
- Markedsføringsøkonom (In Danish)
- Bachelor i International Handel og Markedsføring (In Danish)
- Datamatiker (In Danish)
- Webudvikler (PBA) (In Danish)
- Laborant (In Danish)
- Fødevare-, ernærings- og procesteknolog (In Danish)
- Have- og parkingeniør (In Danish)

=== Campus Køge ===
Campus Køge is located in Køge, and offers the following programmes:

- Multimedia Design and Communication
- Logistics Management
- Service, Hospitality and Tourism Management
- Digital Concept Development
- Administrationsøkonom (In Danish)
- Diplomuddannelse i ledelse (Danish + English)
- E-koncept (Danish + English)
- Multimediedesigner (Danish + English)
- Serviceøkonom (Danish + English)
- Logistikøkonom (Danish + English)

=== Campus Næstved ===
Campus Nøstved is located at Femøvej 3 on Næstved.

- Commerce Management (In English)
- International Sales and Marketing Management (In English)
- Finansøkonom
- Handelsøkonom
- Autoteknolog
- Byggetekniker
- Bygningskonstruktør
- Datamatiker
- Innovation og entrepreneurship

=== Campus Slagelse ===
Campus Slagelse is located in Slagelse, and offers the following programmes:

- Service, Hospitality and Tourism Management (In English)
- Digital konceptudvikling (PBA)
- Installatør-VVS
- Jordbrugsteknolog
- Jordbrug (PBA)
- Laborant
- Multimediedesigner
- Produktionsteknolog
- Serviceøkonom

=== Campus Nykøbing ===
- Marketing Management (In English)
- Multimedia Design and Communication (In English)
- Markedsføringsøkonom
- Multimediedesigner
- El-installatør

== See also ==
- KEA – Copenhagen School of Design and Technology
