= Ministry of Higher Education and Science (Denmark) =

Government ministry of Denmark

- Uddannelses- og Forskningsministeriet
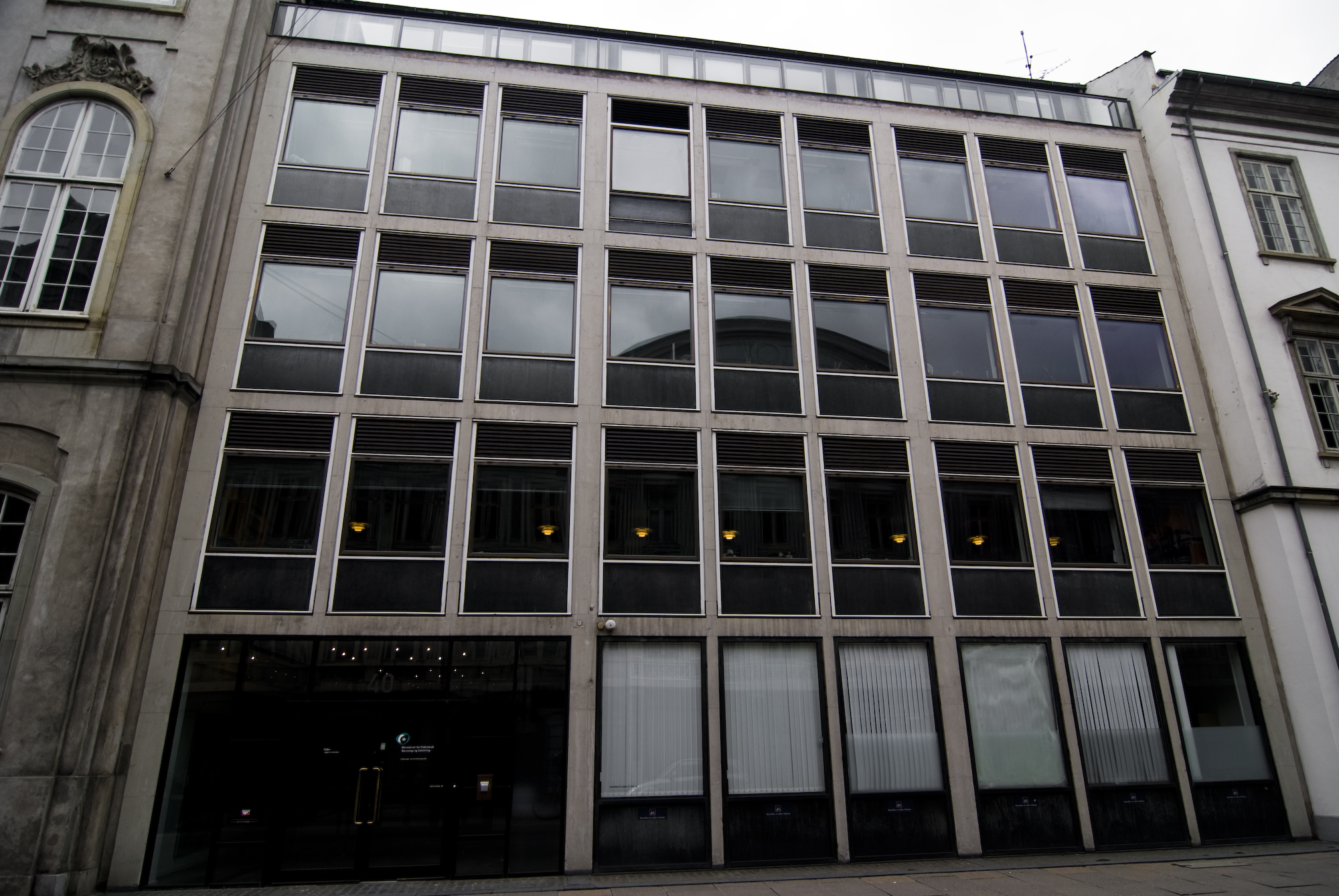
- The ministry's main office

Ministry overview
- Jurisdiction: Denmark
- Headquarters: Bredgade 40-42
- Minister responsible: Christina Egelund, Minister of Science
- Ministry executive: Hanne Meldgaard, Permanent Secretary
- Website: Official website

The Danish Ministry of Higher Education and Science (Danish: Uddannelses- og Forskningsministeriet) is the Danish ministry in charge of research and education above high school/upper secondary school.

The ministry has also been known as the "Ministry of Science, Innovation and Higher Education", the "Ministry of Science, Technology and Innovation of Denmark", the "Science Ministry", the "Research Ministry", and the "Ministry of Research and Technology".

Its primary purpose is to promote and coordinate the interaction between the industry and trade, centres of research and education and strengthen industry and research policies.

== Institutions ==
Institutions under the Ministry of Higher Education and Science.

Business academies

- Copenhagen Business Academy
- Business Academy Aarhus
- Dania Academy
- IBA International Business Academy
- Business Academy MidWest
- Zealand Academy of Technologies and Business
- EA Business Academy SouthWest

Universities

- Aalborg University
- Aarhus University
- Copenhagen Business School
- Technical University of Denmark
- IT University of Copenhagen
- University of Copenhagen
- Roskilde University
- University of Southern Denmark
