= Prinsesse Charlottes Gade =

Street in Copenhagen, Denmark

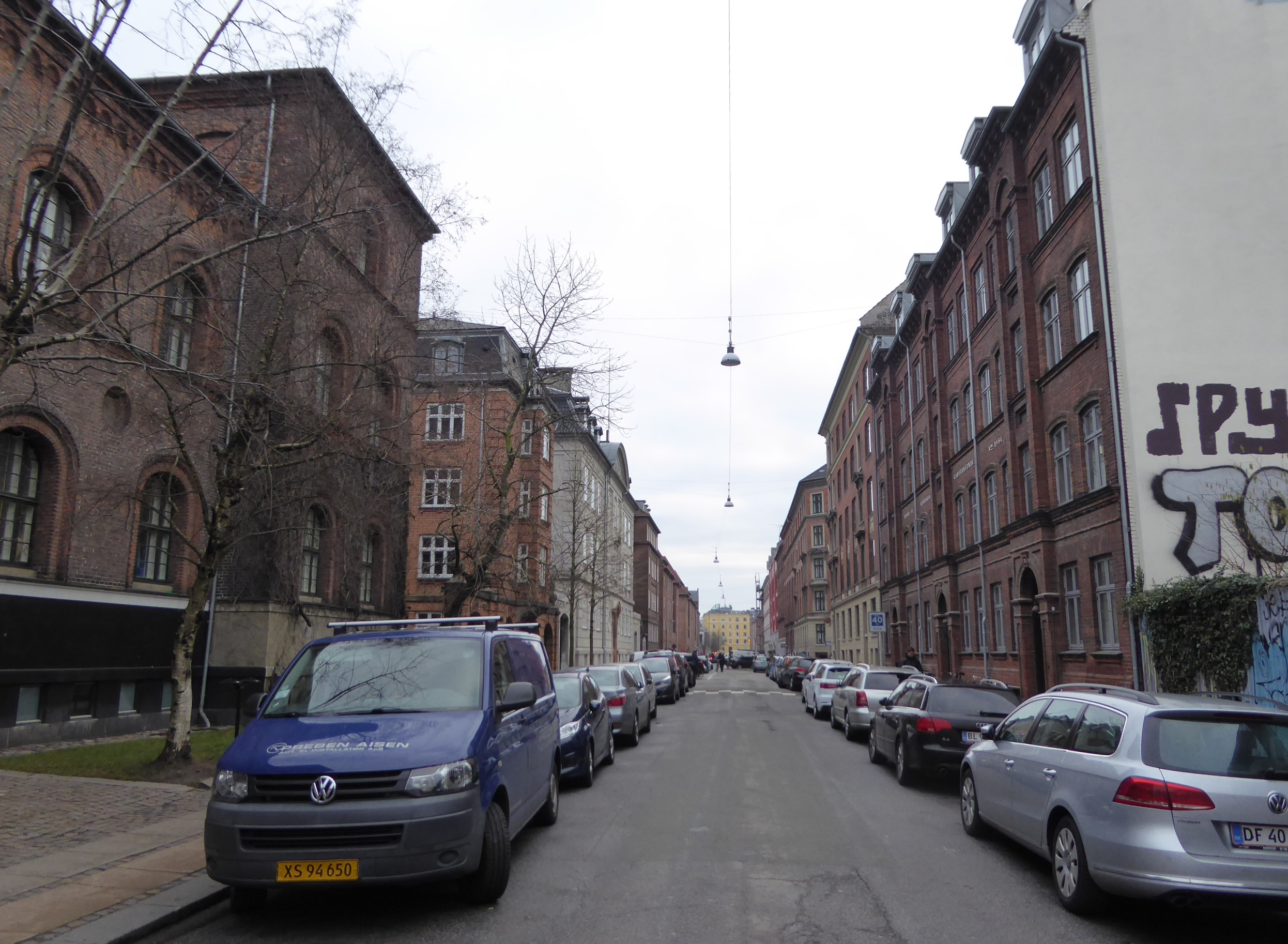
- Length: 420 m (1,380 ft)
- Location: Copenhagen, Denmark
- Quarter: Nørrebro
- Postal code: 2200
- Nearest metro station: Nørrebros Runddel
- Southeast end: Meinungsgade
- Northwest end: Jagtvej

Prinsesse Charlottes Gade (lit. 'Princess Charlottes Street') is a street in the Nørrebro district of Copenhagen, Denmark, linking Meinungsgade in the southeast with Jagtvej in the northwest.

Guldberg Byplads, a public space and playground, is located at the corner with Sjællandsgade.

== History ==
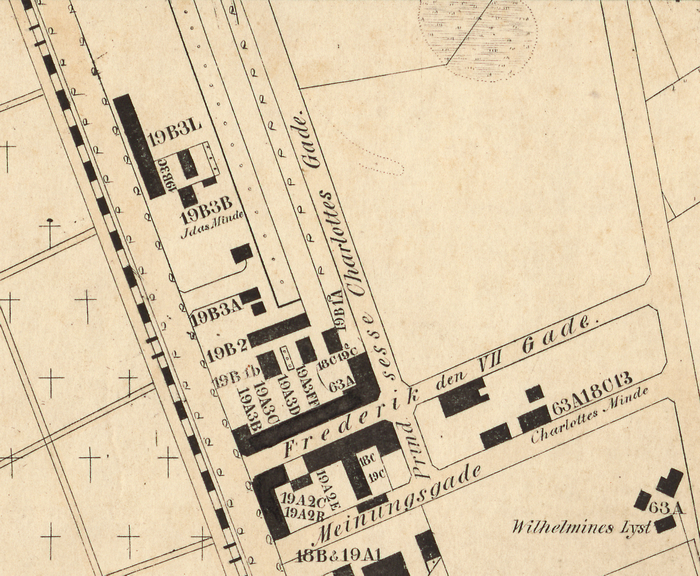
The street seen on a map detail from the 1850s

The street was created in the 1850s. The new street was named after Princess Charlotte Frederica, the first wife of Christian VIII and the mother of Frederick VII. The street followed the east side of Svendsens Reberbane, a several hundred metres long ropewalk.

== Notable buildings ==
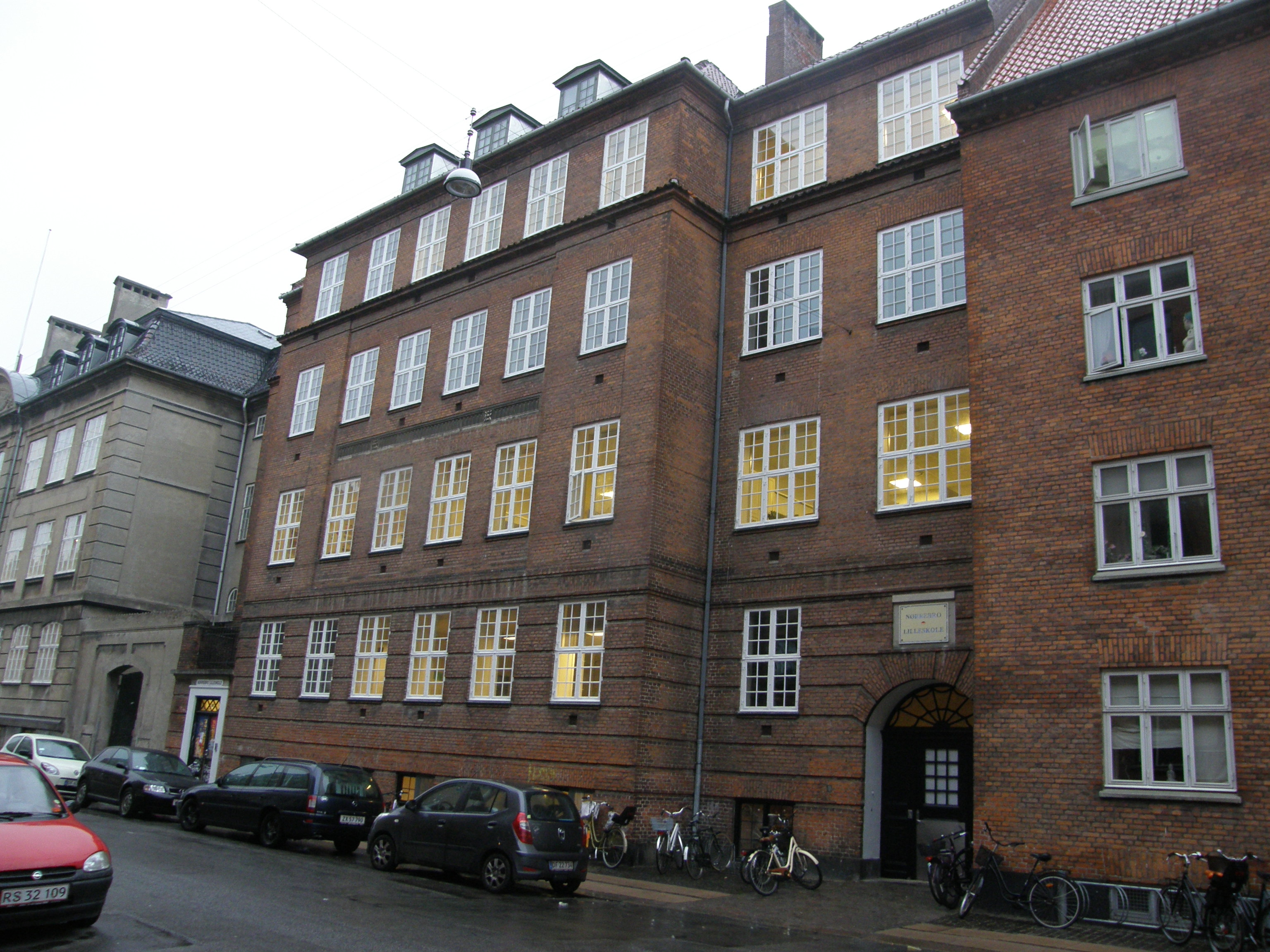
No. 34-36: Nørrebro Lilleskole

Nørrebro Lilleskole (No. 34-36) is a self-owning primary school. The building is the former home of the Jewish Carolineskolen. It was built as Copenhagen's Jewish boys' school which had until then been based in Skindergade. The school was merged with the city's Jewish girls' school under the name Carolineskolen in 1945. It relocated to a former stockings factory on Bomhusvej in the Ryvangen Quarter of Østerbro in 1974.

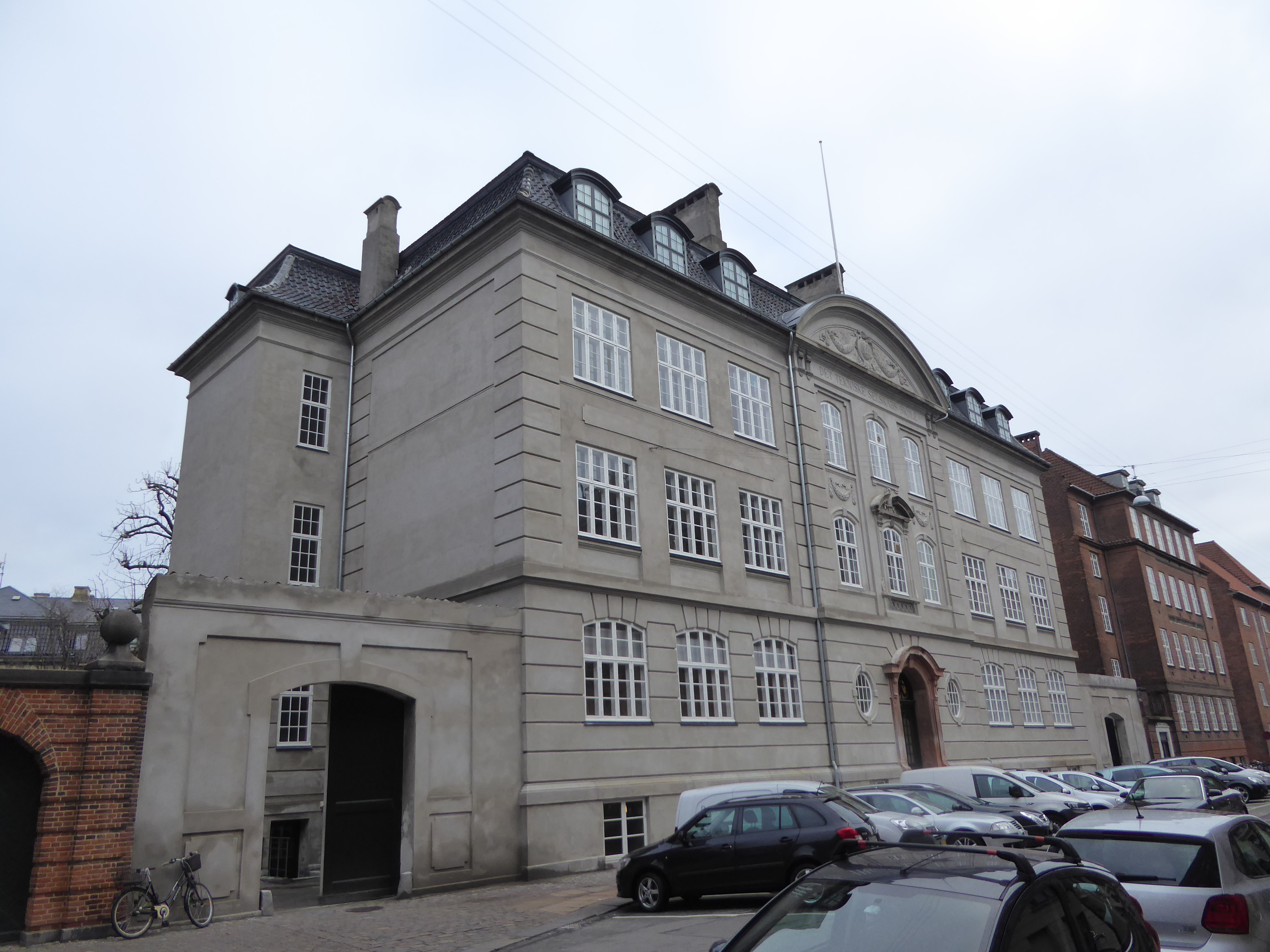
No. 38: KEA Prinsesse Charlottes Gade

KEA Prinsesse Charlottes Gade (No. 38) is a branch of KEA – Copenhagen School of Design and Technology. The building was constructed as a branch of the Technical Society's School. It was completed in 1900 from a design by Frederik Bøttger and Christian Larsen. It now houses KRA's construction & technology programmes as well as the student-run Monkey Bar.

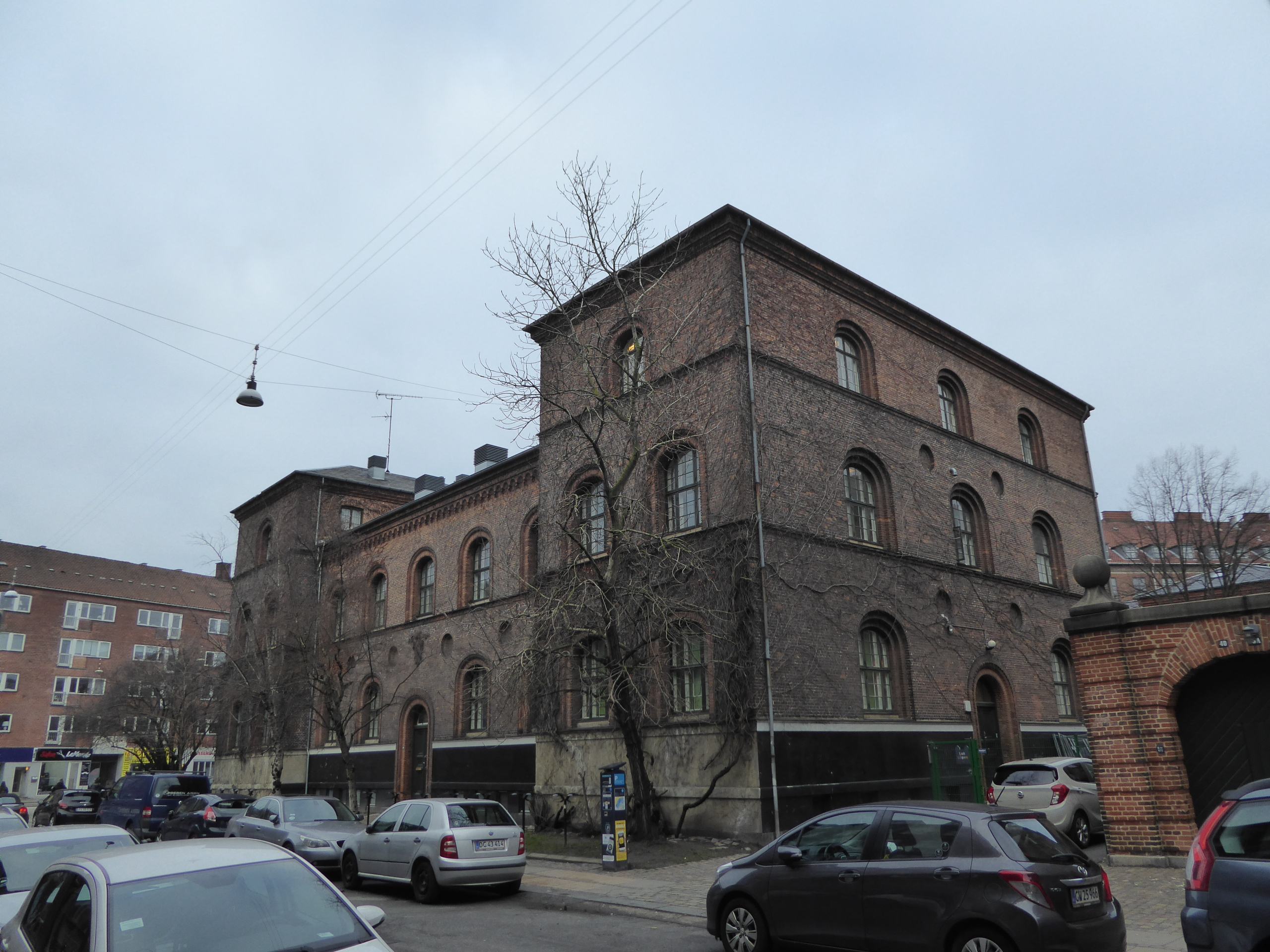
No. 46: Hulahophuset

The former Prinsesse Charlottes Gade School (No. 46) was one of the first primary schools in Nørrebro. It opened in 1875 as a branch of Sankt Hansgade School. The building was designed by Hans Jørgen Holm. The building is now operated as a daycare under the name Hulahophuset. The building on the other side of the street was built by Copenhagen Municipality in 1884 as stated in an inscription on the facade.

== Public art, monuments and memorials ==
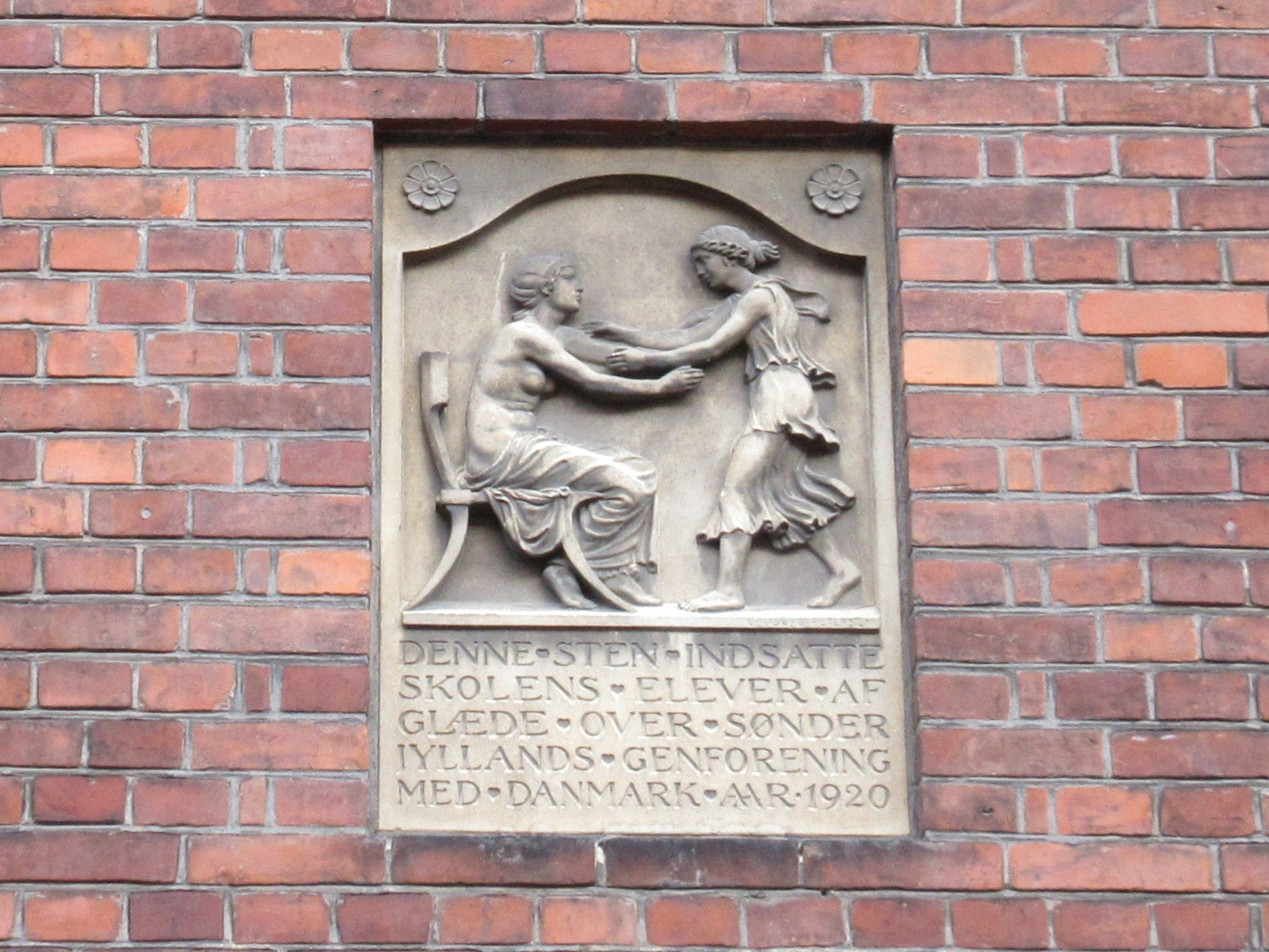
The reunification plaque on the gable of Sjællandsgade School

On the gable of the former Sjællandsgade School is a stone plaque commemorating the reunification of Sønderjylland with Denmark in 1920. The plaque features a symbolic relief of a woman approaching another woman seated on a klismos, both with their arms stretched out towards each other as if they are about to embrace. Below the relief is an inscription: "This stone was installed by the school's pupils in exhilaration over the reunification of Sønderjylland with Denmark 1920".

== Transport ==
The nearest Copenhagen Metro station is Nørrebros Runddel.
