= KEA – Copenhagen School of Design and Technology =

Københavns Erhvervsakademi
- Type: University of Applied Sciences
- Established: 2009; 17 years ago
- Administrative staff: 350
- Students: 5475 full-time (2020); 3,850 part-time (2020)
- Location: Copenhagen, Denmark; 55°41′29″N 12°33′18″E
- Website: www.kea.dk

KEA – Copenhagen School of Design and Technology (Danish: Københavns Erhvervsakademi, usually referred to as KEA), is a school of higher education in Copenhagen, Denmark. The academy is an independent self-owning institution subordinated to the Ministry of Science, Innovation and Higher Education. Degree programmes offered are mainly applied degrees, especially in design, technology and IT. The academy grants undergraduate and Professional degrees and has no graduate school. In addition to full-time studies the academy offers supplemental education, part-time programmes at bachelor's level and short-term courses for people who need to strengthen their qualifications. With 4,717 full-time students and 3,907 part-time students and about 350 employees as of 2015, the academy is one of the largest business academies in Denmark.

== Campus ==
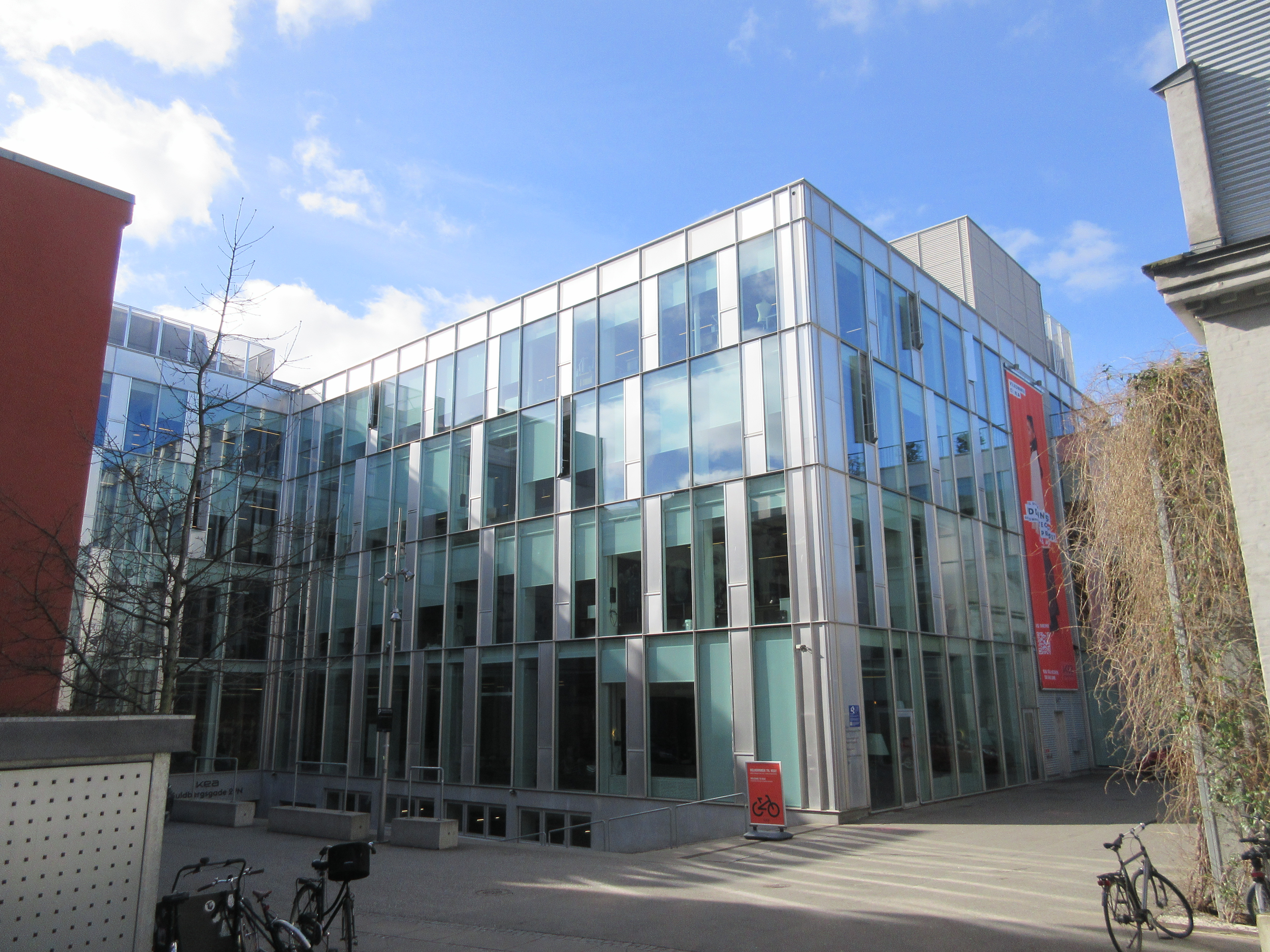
KEA Guldbergsgade in 2024.

KEA currently consists of 8 different locations, most of which are concentrated in the districts of Nørrebro and North West.

The main campus, KEA Guldbergsgade, occupies a dense site in the area between Guldbergsgade, Mimersgade, Peter Fabers Gade and Nørrebrogade. It opened in 2013, designed by Bertelsen & Scheving Arkitekter and is partly located in a converted 4-story industrial building from the 1950s, a former printing business.

The other buildings are located on Prinsesse Charlottes Gade (No. 38)in Nørrebro and Bispevej (No, 5), Lygten (No. 16 and 37) in North West, Lersø Parkallé (No. 2), Landskronagade (No. 64) and Rosenvængets Allé (No. 20B) and Frederikkevej (No. 8) in Hellerup. The Landskronagade campus tenancy was terminated in 2016, and operations were moved out in the summer of 2017.

== Programmes ==
=== Academy Professional Degree Programme ===
- Computer science
- Design, technology and business
- IT technology
- Multimedia design and communication
- Production technology

=== Top-up Bachelor's degrees ===
- E-Concept Development
- Design & Business
- Software Development
- Web Development
- IT Security
- Product Development & Interactive Development

=== Bachelor's degrees ===
- Architectural Technology and Construction Management
- Business, Economics and IT
- Jewellery, Technology and Business
