= Sjællandsgade Public Baths =

Historic building in Copenhagen, Denmark

- Sjællandsgade Bad
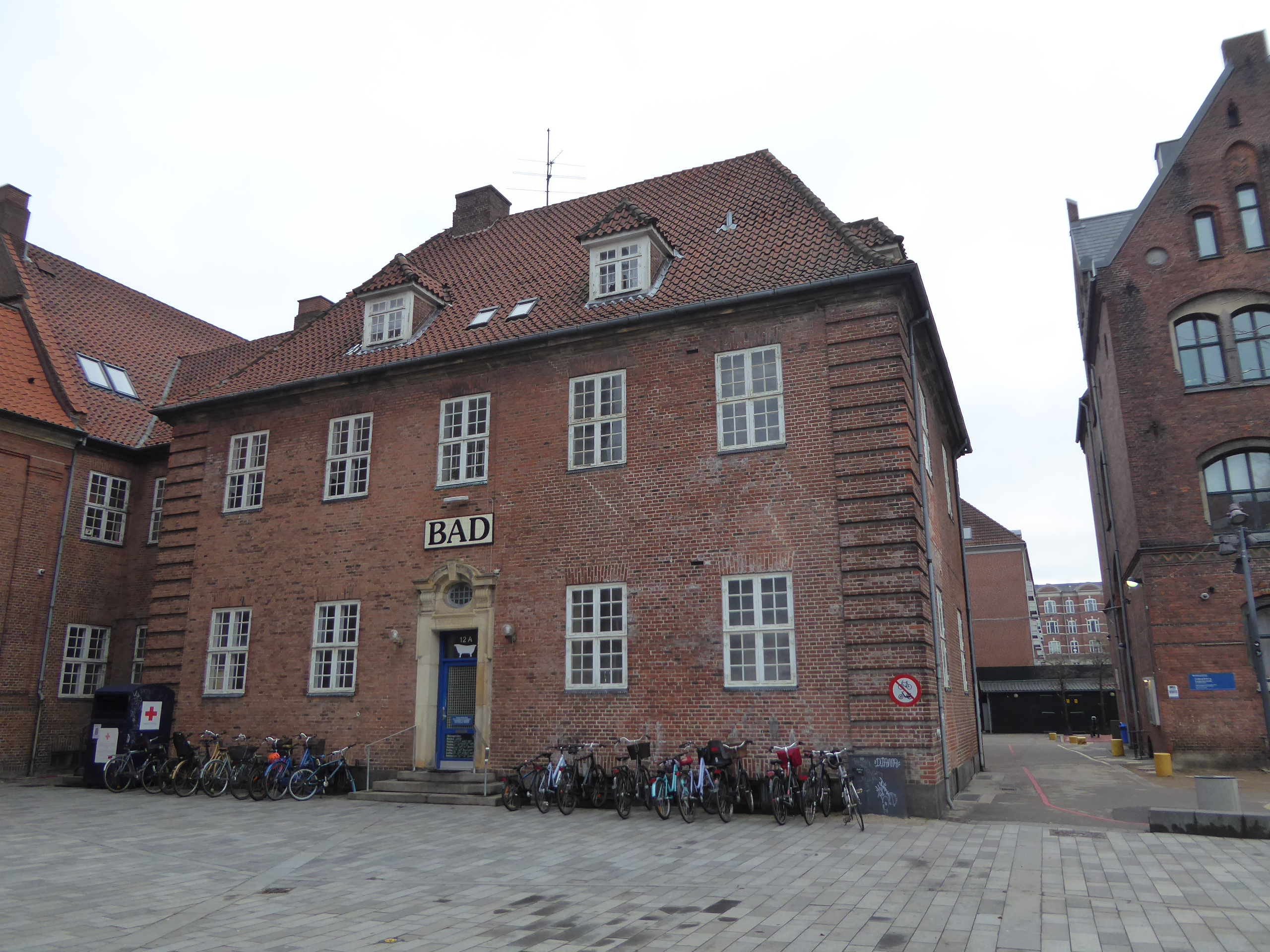
- Sjællandsgade Baths seen from Guldberg Plads

General information
- Architectural style: Baroque Revival
- Location: Copenhagen, Denmark
- Coordinates: 55°41′36.5″N 12°33′12.5″E
- Construction started: 1916
- Completed: 1917
- Client: Copenhagen Municipality

Design and construction
- Architect: Hans Wright

Sjællandsgade Public Baths (Danish: Sjællandsgade Badeanstalt), now officially known as Sjællandsgade Bad (transl. Sjællandsgade Baths), is a public bath house located at Sjællandsgade 12A, adjacent to Simon's Church and Sjællandsgade School, in the Nørrebro district of Copenhagen, Denmark. The Baroque Revival style-building from 1917 was listed on the Danish registry of protected buildings and places in 2013. The bath house was shortly thereafter reopened by a group of volunteers.

== History ==
In 1898, the Social Democratic group in Copenhagen City Council, headed by later mayor Jens Jensen, proposed the construction of a series of municipal bath houses in the city's working-class neighbourhoods. They were seen as an important part of the drive to alleviate sanitary problems in the city. Many working-class families, living in overcrowded tenements, had no place to bathe. The first municipal bath house opened in Saxogade in 1903. It was followed by Sofiegade Public Baths in Christianshavn and a bath house in Helsingørsgade in the Borgergade-Adelgade neighbourhood. The public bath house in Sjællandsgade was constructed in 1916–1917. The section for women was located on the ground floor while the one for men was located on the first floor. The coal-fired boiler was also located in a room on the ground floor.

The building was designed by city architect Hans Wright.

The building was decommissioned when private bath rooms became common later in the century. The building was listed on the Danish registry of protected buildings and places on 20 December 2013.

== Architecture ==
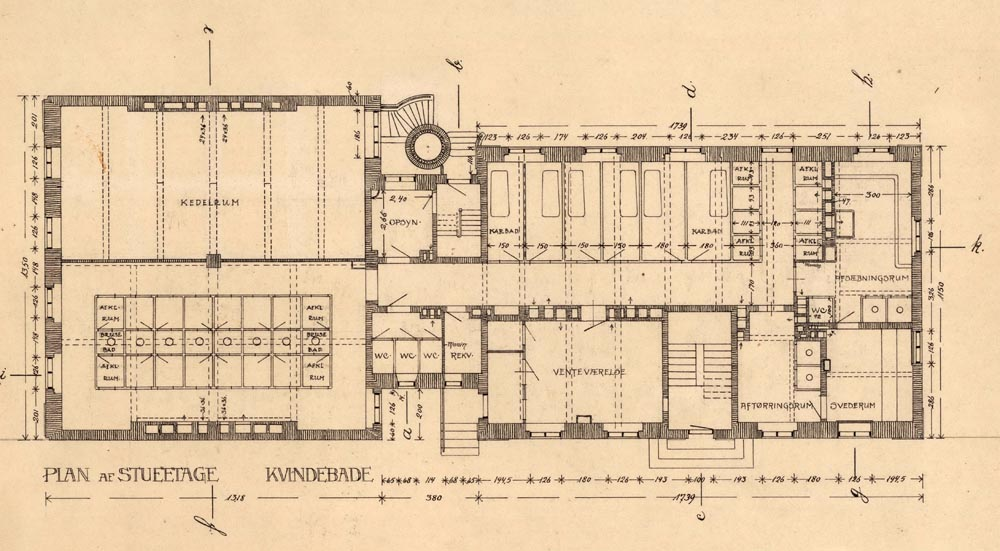
Plan of the section for women

Designed in the then-popular Baroque Revival style, Sjællandsgade Public Baths are constructed in red brick with symmetrically placed windows, a hipped red tile roof and lesenes at the corners. A tall, free-standing chimney was originally located next to the building but it has been demolished.

== Today ==
Sjællandsgade Public Baths was reopened as a public bath house by a group of volunteers in the mid-2010s. It is occasionally also used as a venue for exhibitions and other events.
