= Guldbergsgade =

Street in Copenhagen, Denmark

Coordinates: 55.6936°N 12.5551°E

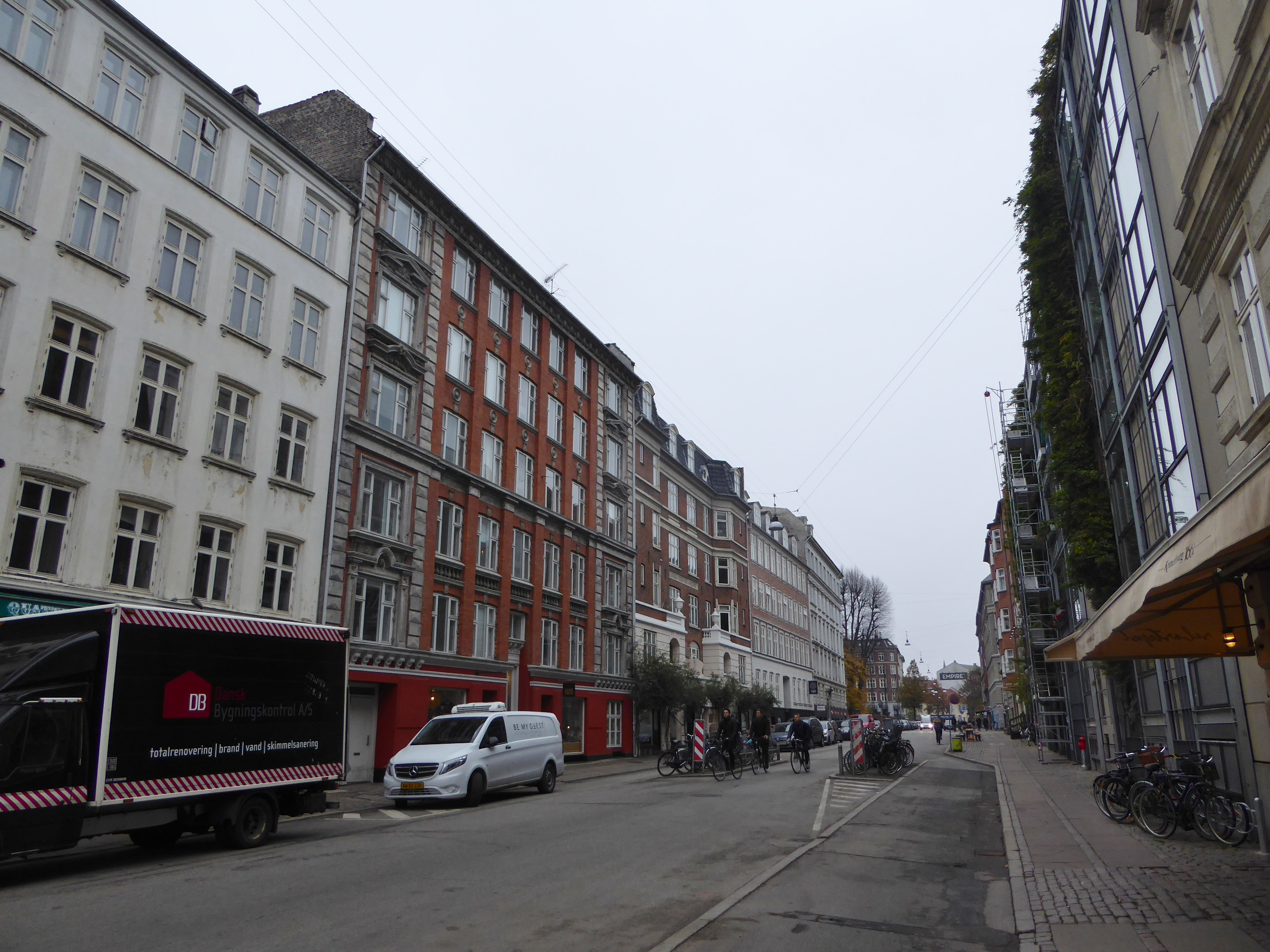
Guldbergsgade

Guldbergsgade is a street in the Nørrebro district of Copenhagen, Denmark. It follows a clockwise curve from Sankt Hans Torv in the south to Tagensvej in the north. The first part of the street passes the Jewish Northern Cemetery to the west and De Gamles By to the east. The public space Guldbergs Plads with a landscaped playground, is located close to its north end.

== History ==
Guldbergsgade was originally called Barkmøllevej. The name referred to Garvernes Barkmølle ("The Tanners' Bark Mill") at Sankt Hans Torv, one of three windmills in the area. Another section of the road was called Lille Blegdamsvej ("Little Blegdamsvej"). The road received its current name in 1959. The name commemorates Frederik Høegh-Guldberg, a son of former Danish prime minister Ove Høegh-Guldberg, who built a house on the street in the beginning of the 19th century while he worked as a teacher at nearby Blaagaard Seminarium. Peter Fabersgade was also called Guldbergsgade until 1896.

== Notable buildings and residents ==
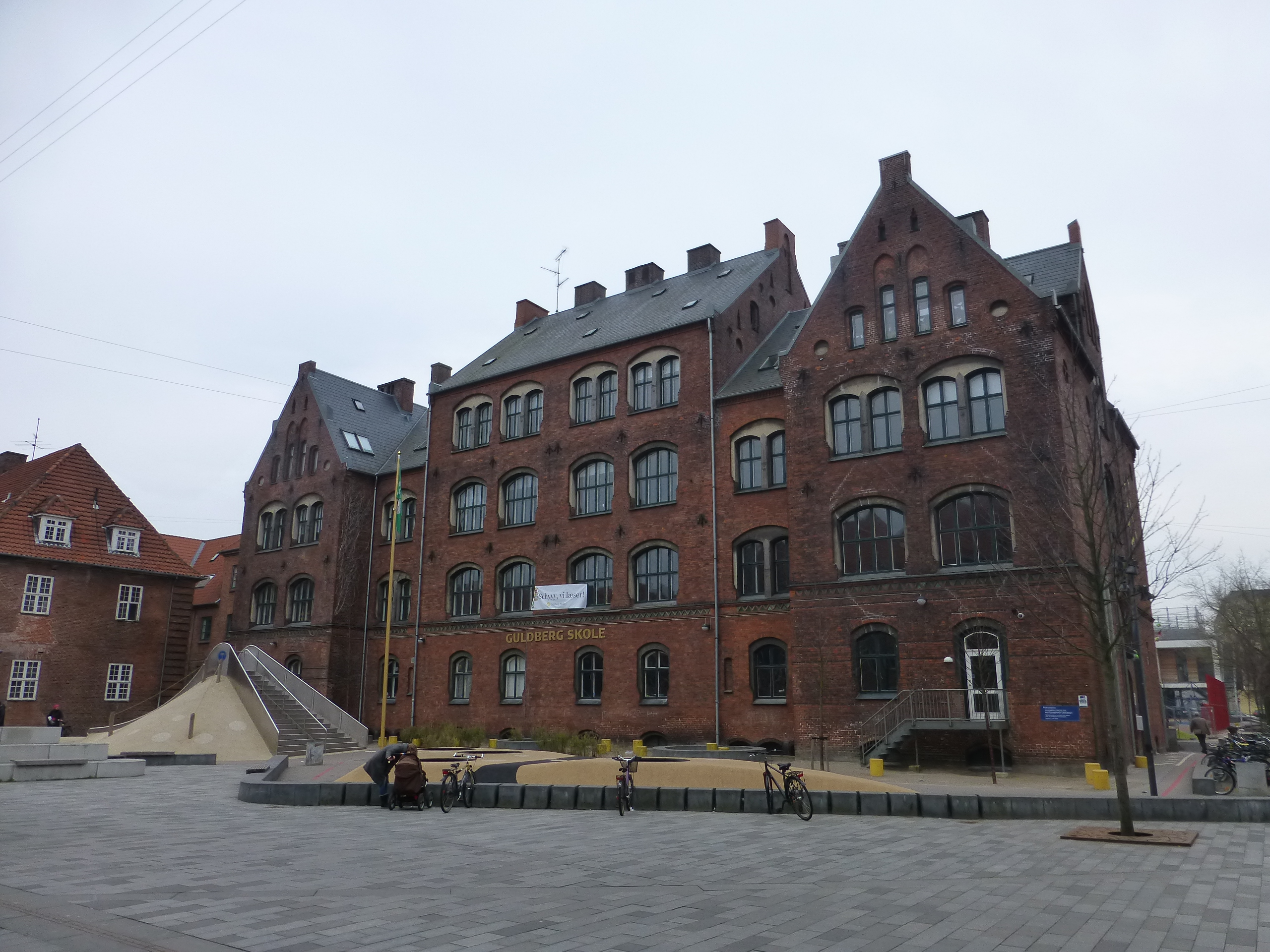
Guldberg School

Empire Bio (No. 29F) is a cinema located in a former industrial building. It was adapted for its current use by the architectural firm CEBRA. KEA – Copenhagen School of Design and Technology's Guldbergsgade Campus, also referred to as the Empire Campus, is located to the rear of the cinema. It occupies a dense site between Guldbergsgade, Mimersgade, Nørrebrogade and Peter Fabers Gade and was established in 2011–2013. It is partly based in a complex of old, industrial buildings which were adapted for their current use by Bertelsen & Scheving Arkitekter.

The 1,000 square metre Italian restaurant and delicacy store Bæst (No. 29) opened next to the cinema in 2014. It is run by the chef Christian Puglisi who also runs the one Muchelin-starred restaurant Relæ in nearby Jægersborggade. The primary school Guldberg Skole is located just off Guldbergsgade at Stevnsgade 38.

The block at Guldbergsgade 72-82/Sjællandsgade/Fensmarksgade/Tibirkegade is from 1921 and was designed by Axel Preisler.

== Public spaces ==
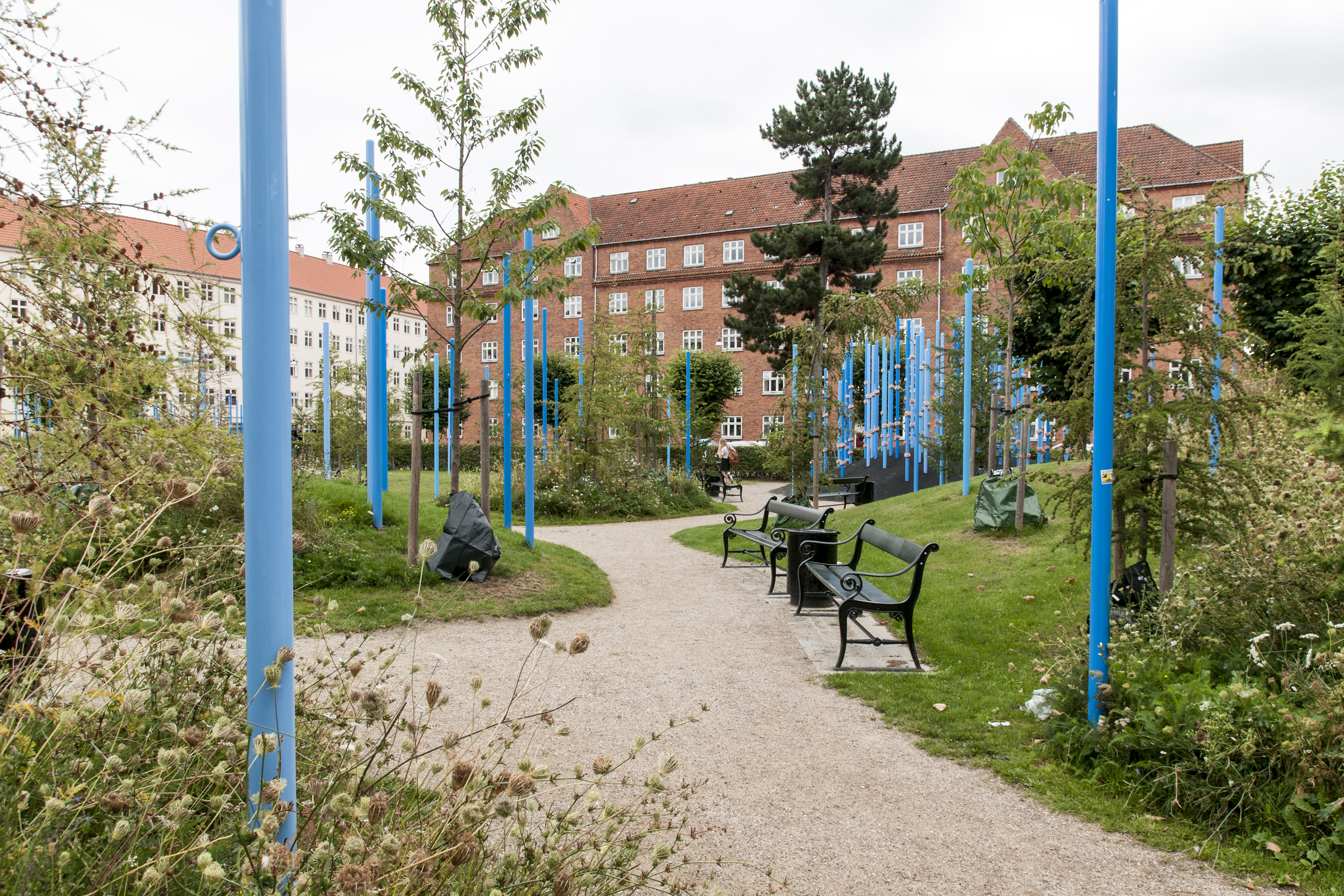
Guldbergs Plads

The spaces on both sides of Guldberg School was refurbished between 2006 and 2011. The area to the rear of the school is now called Guldberg Byplads.

Guldbergs Plads, on the other side of Guldbergsgade and a little further north, was refurbished by the landscape architects 1:1 Landskab in 2015. It is now home to a landscaped playground with installations aimed at promoting physical activity. The most distinctive feature is a "pole forest" situated on a small hill. The installations are all painted in the same blue colour to lend a sense of place to the formerly rather deserted public space.

The street is also subject to traffic calming but the closure of Børrebrogade to cars has led to increased traffic in many of the side streets and further initiatives are therefore planned in 2016.

== In media and popular culture ==
The 2015, DR1 documentary Marta og Guldsaksen followed life in and around a hairdresser's at Guldbergsgade 59.
