= Hans Wright =

Danish architect

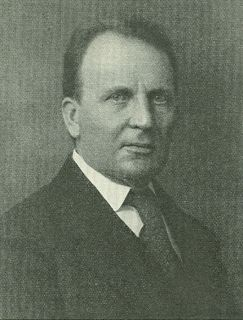
- Born: 29 December 1854; Helsingør, Denmark
- Died: 3 December 1925 (aged 70); Jægersborg, Denmark
- Occupation: Architect

Hans Wright (29 December 1854 – 3 December 1925) was a Danish architect. He served as city architect in Copenhagen from 1904 to 1925.

== Early life and education ==
Wright was born in Helsingør, the son of ship-owner and major Albert Wright and Wigoline Jensine Margrethe Beck.

He went to school in Helsingør and then moved to Copenhagen where he apprenticed as a carpenter and studied at Copenhagen Technical College until 1875. He then enrolled at the Royal Danish Academy of Fine Arts from where he graduated as an architect in June 1881.

== Career ==
Wright initially worked for Hos H. Chr. Hansen, Vilhelm Friederichsenm Johannes Emil Gnudtzmann and Johan Daniel Herholdt.

He worked for Copenhagen Municipality from 1884 and from 1886 under city architect Ludvig Fenger. He headed the department of building maintenance from 1899. When city architect Ludvig Fenger died in 1904, Ludvig Claussen, his intended successor, had recently died. Wright was therefore appointed as acting city architect. The appointment of a new city architect was delayed by the city's considerations about discontinuing the office to rely on private architects but these plans were abandoned and in 1907 Wright was appointed on a permanent basis. His work comprises large residential developments in Nørrebro and Vesterbro, public schools and bath houses, and technical installations.

== Personal life ==
Wright married Louise Gustave Dorothea Hildegard von Bauditz (1861-1935), a daughter of actuary and later hospital manager in Helsingør Carl Adolph Valentin von B. and Elisabeth Jeanette Carlsen, on 1 May 1886 in Helsingør.

== List of works ==
=== Private practice ===
- M. Lunding's School, Amicisvej 19, Frederiksberg (1884)
- Gethsemane Church, Dannebrogsgade 53, Copenhagen (1893–94, tower added in 1900, church demolished in 1914 and rebuilt in 1915-16 by Wright)
- VKrarup House, Gersonsvej 12, Hellerup (1898)
- Frederiksberg Kommunes elektricitetsværk, Hortensiavej, Frederiksberg (1898–99, later altered, from 1928 used as a substation)
- Frederiksberg Kommunes elektricitetsværk, Finsensvej 74 (1908)
- Antonigade Police Station, Antonigade 11 (1909)
- Frederiksberg Kommunes elektricitetsværk, Sankt Knuds Vej 30 (1909)
- Villa Rosenhøj, for Fritz Johannsen, Vedbæk Strandvej 379, Vedbæk (1910, with E.A.W. Marston)
- Interior alterations of Sparekassen for København og Omegn, Niels Hemmingsens Gade 24 (1911–13, with Albert Oppenheim)
- Sparekassen for København og Omegn, Amagerbrogade 69 (1915, sammen med Albert Oppenheim)
- Interior work on Sparekassen for København og Omegn, Amagerbrogade 147 (1915, with Albert Oppenheim)

=== City Architect's Office ===
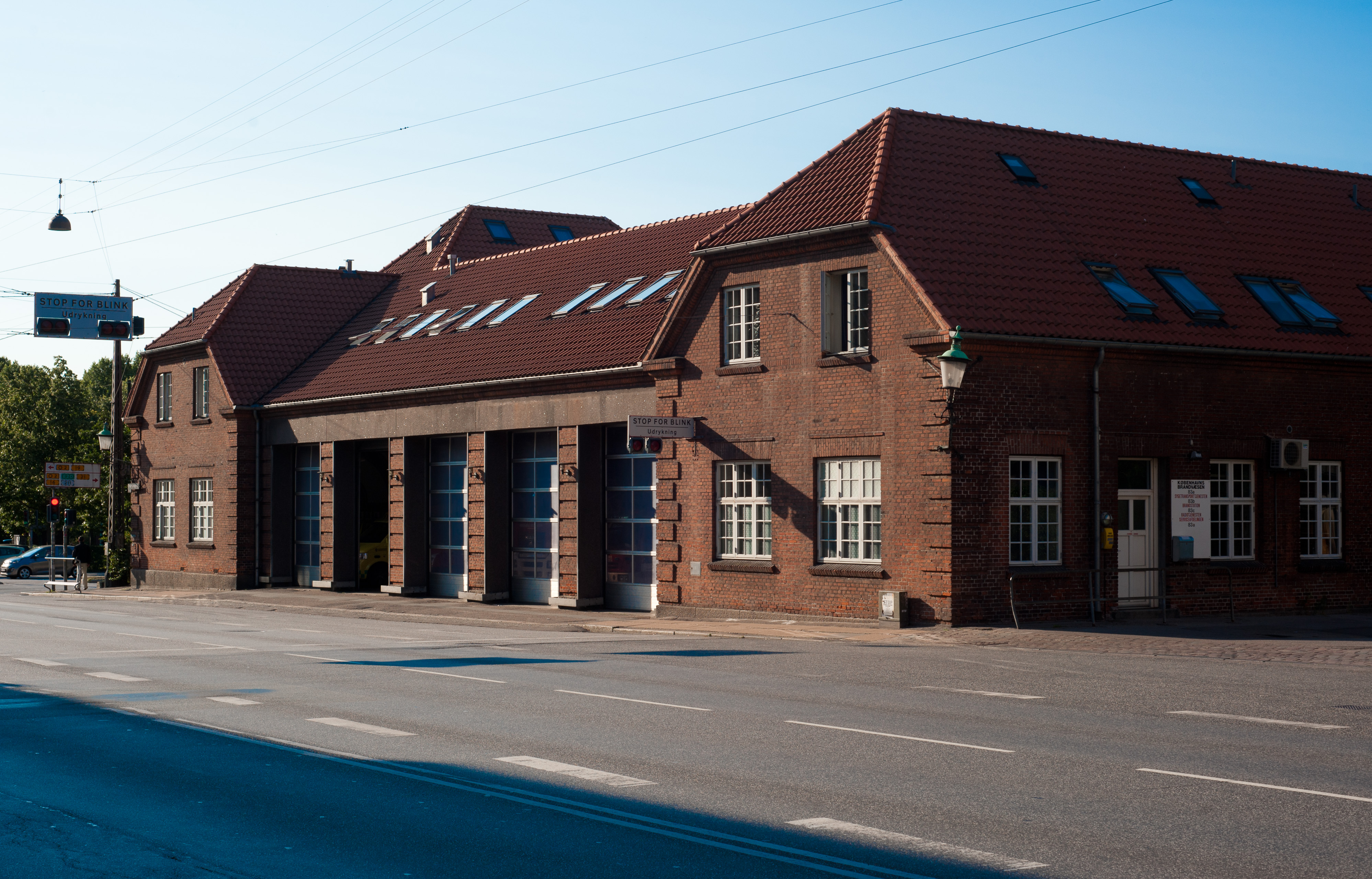
Tomsgården Fire Station (1907)

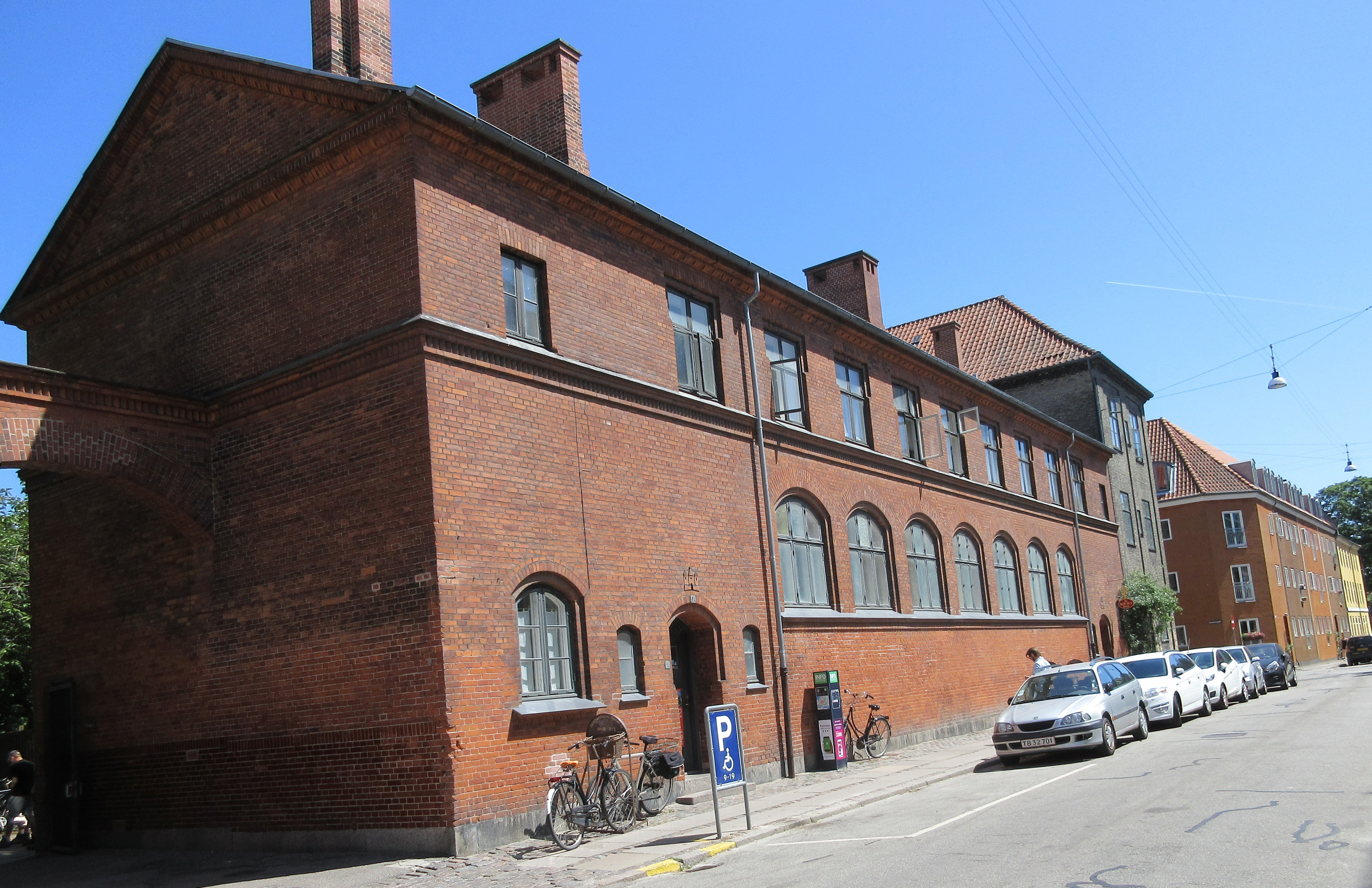
No. 15A: SofieBadet

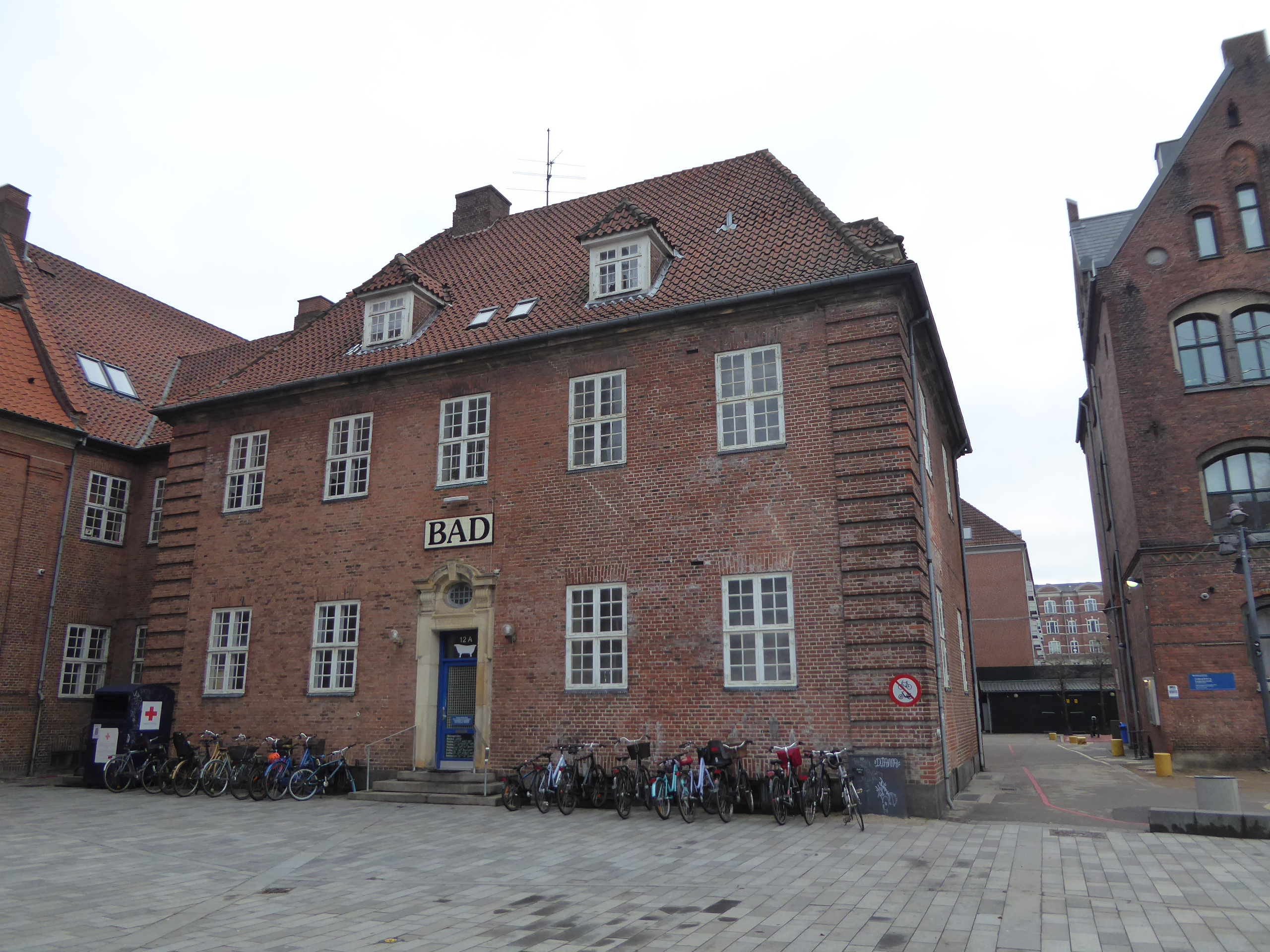
Sjællandsgade Public Baths (1917)

- Tomsgården Fire Station, Frederiksundssvej 83 (1906–07, windows changed)
- Pumping station at Svanemøllebugten (1908)
- Arbejderboliger ved Valby Gasværk, Vigerslevvej 135, opgang 1-9 (1908)
- Flæskehal, Kalvebod Brygge (1908–10, demolished)
- Toilet building and pavilions, Fælledparken (1908–10, with city engineer J.J. Voigt, engineer O.K. Nobel and landscape architect Edvard Glæsel)
- Sofiegade Public Baths, Sofiegade 15 (1909)
- Club House, Københavns Idrætspark (1909–11, demolished)
- Vigerslev Allé Sc hool, Vigerslev Allé]] 108 (1909–10)
- Vognmandsmarken School, Bellmansgade 1 (1911–12)
- Ny Carlsbergvej School, Ny Carlsbergvej 35 (1912–13)
- Stevnsgad School, Stevnsgade 38 (1913–14)
- Vanløse School, Ålekistevej 121 (1914–15, expanded in 1924)
- Sjællandsgade Public Baths, Sjællandsgade 12 (1917m listed in 2013)
- Lergravsvej School (bow Sundpark School), Wittenbergsgade 2 (1917–18)
- Residential building for nurses, Blegdam Hospital (now part of Panum Instituttet), Nørre Allé (1918)
- Alsgade School, Alsgade 14 (1918–21)
- Homeless shelters ((all demolished), Utterslevvej 17A-25D (1918), Wennersberggade 2-10/Bellmansgade 11-19/Borgervænget 52-64/Ole Bulls Gade 1-9 og 2-10/Edvard Griegs Gade 3-21 (1919), Studsgårdsgade 1-7 E (1919), Utterslevvej 27 A-33 F (1920), Klitmøllervej 27–49, 48-64/Rubjergvej 1-17/Tværstedvej 1-13 og 2-12/Hanstholmvej 28-48 (1921)
- Copenhagen Tramways Main Workshop, Enghavevej 82 (1922)
- Brønshøj School, Liselundvej 2 (1922–23)
- Residential block, Bogfinkevej 5-23/Rørsangervej 61-73 (1923)
- Residential block, Vesterfælledvej 87-91/Angelgade 3-17/Slesviggade 16/Sdr. Boulevard 122-36 (1923)
- Residential block, Rungsted Plads 1-21/Humlebækgade 48/Lundtoftegade 12-34/Nærumgade 7-9 (1924)
- Residential block, Guldbergs Plads 12-20/Guldbergsgade 118-30/Tagensvej 33/Refsnæsgade 47-71/Arresøgade 14-20 (1924)
- Residential block, Sliengade 2-6/Slesvigsgade 21-33/Alsgade 7-9/Dannevirkegade 22-32 (1925–26)
- Vuilding for patients, Sct. Hans Hospital (1926)
