= Axel Preisler =

Danish architect

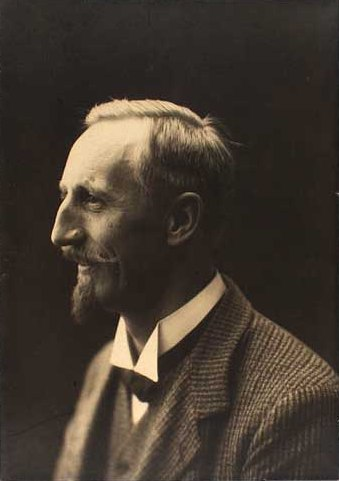
Axel Preislerstret

Axel Preisler(12 May 1871 – 25 September 1930) was a Danish architect.

== History ==
Preisler was born in Odense where his father was a merchant. He completed a carpenter's apprenticeship in his home town and studied at Odense Technical College before enrolling at the Royal Danish Academy of Fine Arts' school of architecture in Copenhagen in 1890. He worked as an assistant in the architectural practices of Valdemar Ingemann, Vilhelm Dahlerup and Heinrich Wenck prior to his graduation in 1899. He was represented at Charlottenborg Spring Exhibition in 1918, 1921 and 1922. He was also active in the Architects' Association and was its chairman in 1930.

== Selected works ==
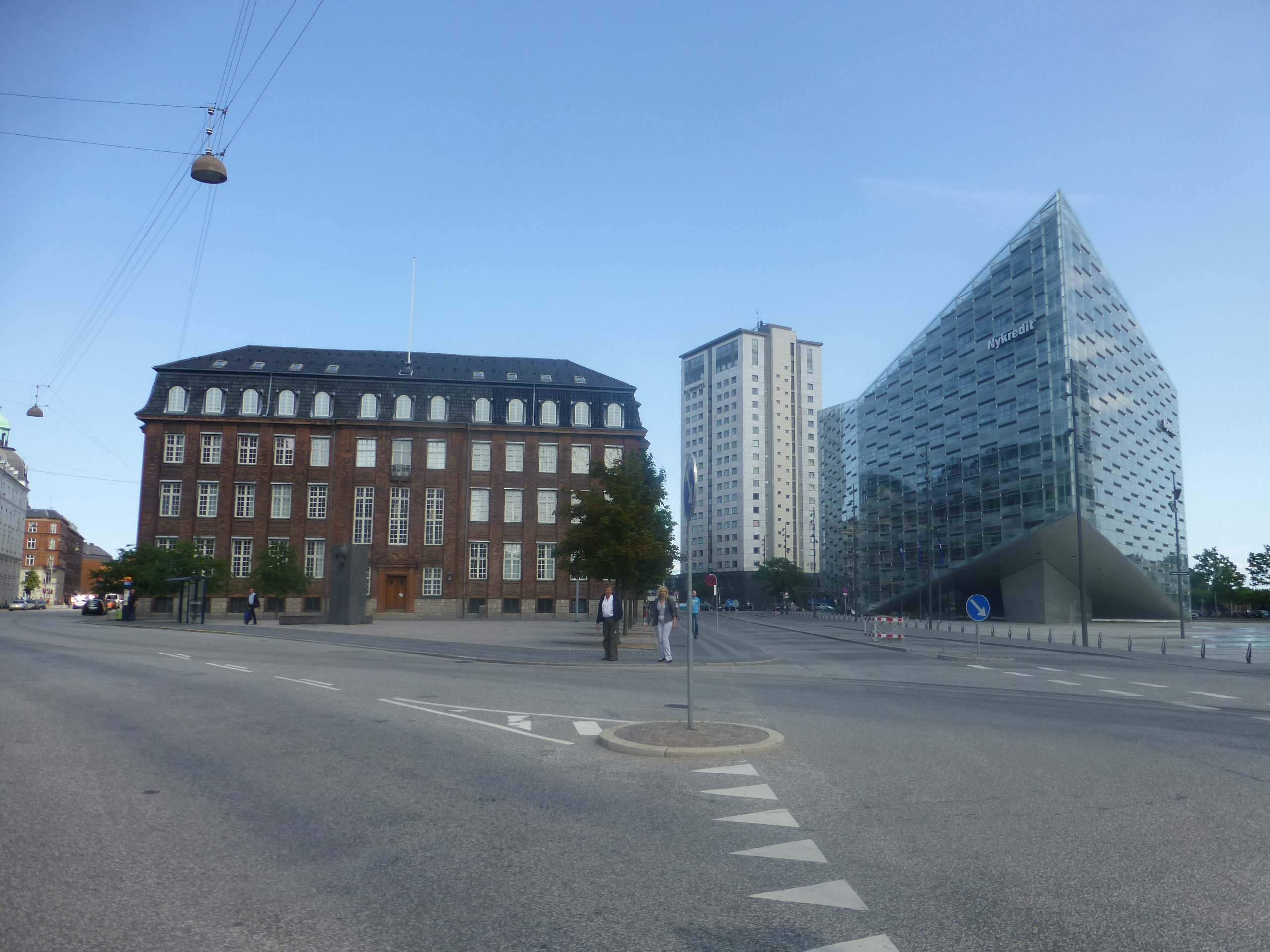
Otto Mønsteds Plads 11stret

- Værnedamsvej 4 B, Copenhagen (1897–98)
- Warehouse, Prinsessegade/Bodenhoffs Plads, Christianshavn, Copenhagen (1898–99, demolished)
- Ulrichsens Stiftelse (rear wing), Wesselsgade 12 A, Copenhagen (1901)
- Apartment building, Ahlmanns Allé 15A/Søbøtkers Allé, Hellerup (1903)
- Frederiksholms Kanal 6, Copenhagen (1904)
- Fredensborg Water Tower, Fredensborg (1905–06)
- Odensegade 23–25 (1906, sammen med Povl Baumann)
- Frederiksberg Allé 66, Frederiksberg, Copenhagen (1906)
- Bülowsvej 40/Rosenørns Allé 70, Frederiksberg (1906, with Povl Baumann)
- Julius Thomsens Gade 7/Åboulevard, Frederiksberg, Copenhagen (1907)
- Administration building, H.E. Gosch, Islands Brygge 63, Copenhagen (1908)
- Dansk Folkeforsikringsanstalt (now converted into apartments), Otto Mønsteds Plads 11, Copenhagen (1909)
- Nordisk Gjenforsikrings Selskab, Grønningen 21–25 (1910, gable changed)
- Railway stations_
  - Ryomgård-Gjerrild-Grenaa Railway, Jutland (1911 and 1917)
  - Nakskov-Kragenæs Railway (1915)
  - Frederiksværk-Hundested Railway (1916)
  - Varde-Grindsted Railway (1919)
- Hammerensgade 2/Store Kongensgade 118 for Reassurancekompagniet Salamandra (1926–27, competition win)

=== In collaboration with Einar Ambt ===
- Pavillon i Voigts Minde, Fåborg (competition held 1911)
- Railway stations (private): Nr. Nebel-Tarm, Varde-Grindsted, Ryomgård- Gjerrild og Hundested-Frederiksværk jernbaner (fra 1911)
- Falkoner Allé 44-46/Skt. Nicolaivej 2, Frederiksberg (1913–14, awarded)
- Strandboulevarden 77A-81, Østerbro, Copenhagen (1914, awarded)
- Port building, Nakskov, Lolland (1915)
- Villa, Gammel Vartov Vej 2, Ryvangen (1915, completely rebuilt)
- Villa, Borgebakken, nu Lyngby-Taarbæk Kommunes plejehjem, Brede (1915–16)
- Villa Strandgården, Richelieus Allé 16, Hellerup (1915–16, awarded)
- Lille Bernstorff, Jægersborg Allé, Charlottenlund (1916–17, awarded)
- Adaption of Store Kongensgade 31 (1916 and later)
- Sommerbolig for civilingeniør Philip Gram, Skodsborg Strandvej 81, Skodsborg (1917)
- Villa, Bernstorfflund Allé 2, Hellerup (1917, awarded)
- Villa, Richelieus Allé 14, Hellerup (1917, awarded)
- Villa, Sofievej 15, Hellerup (1917–18)
- Villa, Tesdorfsvej 40–44, Frederiksberg (1917–18)
- Main building, Endrupgård ved Fredensborg (1918)
- Villa, Hambros Allé 30, Hellerup (1919)
- Guldbergsgade 72-82/Sjællandsgade/Fensmarksgade/Tibirkegade (1921)
- Villa, Rosbæksvej 22, Ryvangen (1922)
- Villaen Stubben i Gilleleje for factory owner Ferslew (1922)
