= List of squares in Copenhagen =

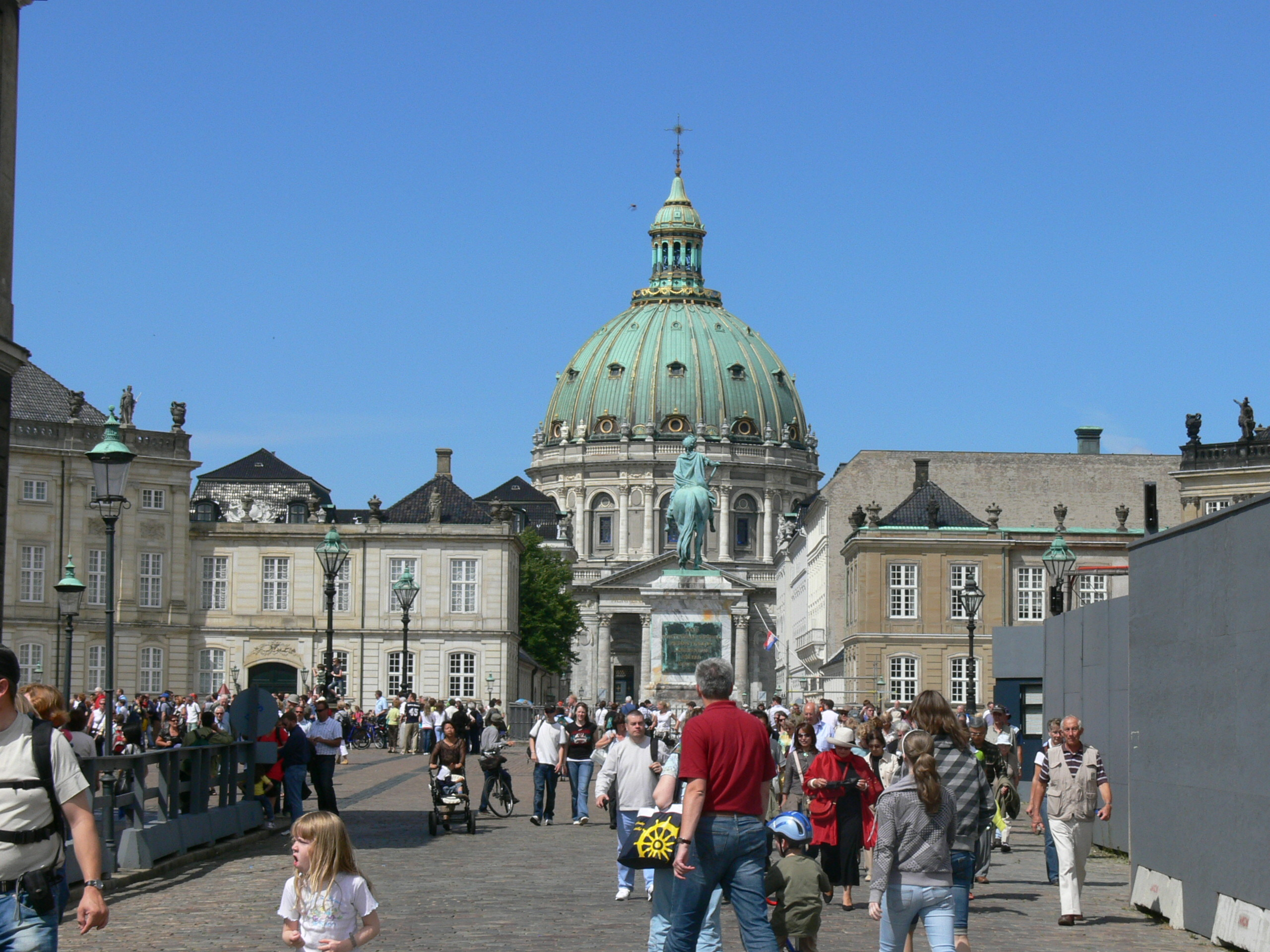
Amalienborg at Frederiksstaden.

This is a list of squares in Copenhagen, Denmark.

== Terminology ==
In Danish, a square is typically called a Plads (Højbro Plads, Israels Plads etc.) or a Torv (or -torv, Christianshavns Torv, Nytorv). The Danish use the word "plads" where an English-speaker would generally use the word "square." This follows the pattern established in other European languages: the German use the cognate "platz" (Berlin's Potsdamer Platz); the French "place" (Paris' Place de Vosque); the Spanish "plaza" (like Madrid's Plaza Mayor); and the Italian "piazza" (Rome's Piazza Navona). The word "torv" literally means "market" and in toponyms often commemorates a market that used to take place at the site: Amagertorv was the place where the Amager farmers used to sell their produce and Kultorvet (literally "The Coal Market") was Copenhagen's main coal market. However, this is not always the case: Søtorvet was never a market place, nor was Sølvtorvet ever a hub for trade in silver. The word "byrum" (literally "urban room") has a somewhat broader meaning then "plads" or "torv", roughly similar to "urban space" (or "public space"), but is purely a generic term which is not used in toponyms.

== Inner city ==
City centre

Name	Image	Neighbourhood	Coordinates	Created	Streets	Landmarks
Amagertorv		Old Town	55°40′42.96″N 12°34′38.64″E		Købmagergade, Strøget	Stork Fountain
Amalienborg Slotsplads		Frederiksstaden			Amaliegade, Frederiksgade	Amalienborg, Frederik V on Horseback
Axeltorv		Vestervold		1917	Vesterbrogade	Axelborg, Circus Building
Bertel Thorvaldsens Plads		Slotsholmen		1848	Vindebrogade	Thorvaldsens Museum
Bispetorv		Latin Quarter	55°40′45.12″N 12°34′18.12″E		Nørregade, Studiestræde	Reformation Memorial
Christiansborg Slotsplads		Slotsholmen				Christiansborg Palace, Frederik VII
Christianshavns Torv		Christianshavn		1617	Overgaden Over Vandet, Torvegade	Christianshavn Station, Greenland Monument
City Hall Square		Vestervold			H. C. Andersens Boulevard, Vester Voldgade	Copenhagen City Hall, Dragon Fountain
Dantes Plads		Vestervold			H. C. Andersens Boulevard	Dante Column
Frue Plads		Old Town			Nørregade, Vester Voldgade	Copenhagen Cathedral, University of Copenhagen
Gammeltorv		Old Town	55°40′41″N 12°34′20″E		Nørregade, Strøget, Skindergade, Vestergade	Caritas Well, Stelling House
Gråbrødretorv		Old Town			Valkendorfsgade	
Hauser Plads		Old Town		1838		
Hjalmar Brantings Plads		Old Town			Stockholmsgade	
Højbro Plads		Old Town	55°40′42″N 12°34′48″E	1795	Læderstræde	Absalon statue
Israels Plads		Nørrevold		1889	Frederiksborggade, Rømersgade, Vendersgade	Bethesda, Israels Plads Food Market
Jarmers Plads		Nørrevold		1888	H. C. Andersens Boulevard, Nørre Voldgade, Vester Voldgade	Jarmer's Tower
Kongens Nytorv		New Copenhagen	55°40′49″N 12°34′9″E	1670	Strøget, Gothersgade, Store Kongensgade, Nyhavn, Holmens Kanal	Charlottenborg, Hotel D'Angleterre, Magasin du Nord, Royal Danish Theatre
Kultorvet		Old Town	55°40′57″N 12°34′26.76″E	1728	Frederiksborggade, Købmagergade	
Magasins Torv		Old Town		1930s	Strøget, Bremerholm	
Nikolaj Plads		Old Town	55°40′43.68″N 12°34′52.32″E	1795		Kunsthallen Nikolaj
Nordre Toldbod Plads		Old Town			Esplanaden	
Nytorv		Old Town	55°40′39.36″N 12°34′22.8″E	1610	Strøget	Copenhagen Court House
Ofelia Plads				2016	Toldbodgade	Royal Danish Playhouse
Otto Mønsteds Plads		Fortification Ring			Anker Heegaards Gade, Otto Mønsteds Gade, Rysensteengade	
Regnbuepladsen		Old Town			Vester Voldgade	Vartov
Sankt Annæ Plads		Frederiksstaden		1750	Amaliegade, Bredgade, Store Strandstræde, Toldbodgade	Prince William Mansion
Staunings Plads		Fortification Ring			Vester Farimagsgade	Technological Institute (old), Stauning Memorial
Vandkunsten		Old Town			Frederiksholms Kanal, Kompagnistræde, Løngangstræde, Gåsegade, Rådhusstræde, Hestemøllestræde	

Amager

Name	Image	Neighbourhood	Coordinates	Created	Streets	Landmarks
Karen Blixens Plads		Ørestad	Ørestad			
Kay Fiskers Plads		Ørestad	Ørestad			
Mikado Plads		Ørestad				IT University of Copenhagen
Svend Aukens Plads		Islands Brygge			Ørestads Boulevard, Njalsgade	
Sundbyvester Plads		Sundby			Amagerbrogade, Sundbyvestervej	

Brønshøj-Husum

Name	Image	Neighbourhood	Coordinates	Created	Streets	Landmarks
Brønshøj Torv		Brønshøj			Frederikssundsvej	Brønshøj Rytterskole
Husum Torv		Husum			Frederikssundsvej, Islevhusvej	

Frederiksberg

Name	Image	Neighbourhood	Coordinates	Created	Streets	Landmarks
Borgmester Godskesens Pads		Frederiksberg			Dalgas Boulevard	
Kejserinde Dagmars Plads		Frederiksberg			Falkoner Allé	
Falkoner Plads		Frederiksberg				Frederiksberg Gymnasium, Frederiksberg Central Library
Frederiksberg Rådhusplads		Frederiksberg			Allégade, Falkoner Allé, Gammel Kongevej, Smallegade	Frederiksberg Town Hall
Frederiksberg Runddel		Frederiksberg		1670	Allégade, Frederiksberg Allé, Pile Alé	Storm P. Museum
Julius Thomsens Plads		Frederiksberg			Rosenørns Allé	St. Mark's Church
Kjeld Petersens Plads		Flintholm			Finsensvej	
Kristian Zahrtmanns Plads		Fuglebakken			Mariendalsvej	
Sankt Thomas Plads		Frederiksberg			Rosenørns Allé	St. Mark's Church
Sløjfen		Frederiksberg			Peter Bangs Vej	

Nordvest

Name	Image	Neighbourhood	Coordinates	Created	Streets	Landmarks
Bispebjerg Torv		Bispebjerg			Frederiksborgvej, Tagensvej	Bispebjerg Cemetery
Emdrup Torv		Emdrup			Frederiksborgvej, Emdrupvej	
Lyngsies Plads		Bispebjerg			Lygten	Lygten Station

Nørrebro

Name	Image	Neighbourhood	Coordinates	Created	Streets	Landmarks
Balders Plads		Nørrebro				
Blågårds Plads		Nørrebro		1902	Blågårdsgade	Blågård Church
Borups Plads		Nørrebro			Borups Allé, Lundtoftegade, Stefansgade	
Den Røde Pads		Nørrebro				
Det Sorte Marked		Nørrebro				
Nuuk Plads		Nørrebro				
Sankt Hans Torv		Nørrebro			Blegdamsvej, Fælledvej, Nørre Allé	St. John's Church

Østerbro

Name	Image	Neighbourhood	Coordinates	Created	Streets	Landmarks
Amerika Plads		Southern Freeport		2008		
Bopa Plads		Inner Østerbro			Randersgade, Viborggade	
Dahlerups Plads		Søndre Frihavn				Dahlerup Warehouse
Gunnar Nu Hansens Plads		Inner Østerbro			Østerbrogade	Østerbro Stadium, Øbro Hallen, Sparta Hallen
Melchiors Plads		Inner Østerbro			Nordre Frihavnsgade	
Oslo Plads		Inner Østerbro			Dag Hammarskjölds Allé, Store Kongensgade, Grønningen	Østerport Station, Østre Anlæg
Østerfælled Torv		Inner Østerbro				Theatre Republique
Sankt Jakobs Plads		Outer Østerbro			Østerbrogade	
Sankt Kjelds Plads		Østerbro			Østerbrogade	
Trianglen		Inner Østerbro			Blegdamsvej, Nordre Frihavnsgade, Østerbrogade	Bien
Trondhjems Plads		Nørrebro				
Victor Borges Plads		Østerbro			Nordre Frihavnsgade	
Århus Plads		Østerbro			Århusgade	

Valby

Name	Image	Neighbourhood	Coordinates	Created	Streets	Landmarks
Toftegårds Plads		Valby			Gammel Køge Landevej, Vigerslev Allé	Spinderiet
Valby Tingsted		Valby			Valby Langgade	Spinderiet
Ålholm Plads		Valby			Roskildevej, Ålholvej	

Vesterbro/Kongens Enghave

Name	Image	Neighbourhood	Coordinates	Created	Streets	Landmarks
Banegårdspladsen		Vesterbro			Vesterbrogade	Copenhagen Central Station
Bryggernes plads		Carlsberg				
Enghave Plads		Vesterbro		1880s	Enghavevej, Istedgade	Church of Christ
Halmtorvet		Vesterbro		1879	Sønder Boulevard	Kødbyen, Øksnehallen
Industrikulturens Plads		Carlsberg				
Litauens Plads		Vesterbro		1879	Saxogade, Dannebrogsgade	Gethseman's Church
Liva Weels Plads		Vesterbro			Ny Carlsbergvej	
Mozarts Plads		South Harbour		1932	Borgmester Christiansens Gade	
Onkel Dannys Plads		Kødbyen		1879	Halmtorvet	Kødbyen
Otto Krabbes Plads		Vesterbro			Westend	
Tove Ditlevsens Plads		Vesterbro		1880s	Enghavevej, Mathæusgade	Tove Ditlevsens Skole
Vesterbros Torv		Vesterbro			Gasværksvej, Vesterbrogade	Elijah's Church

== Suburbs ==
Gentofte Municipality

Name	Image	Neighbourhood	Coordinates	Created	Streets	Landmarks
Dan Turèlls Plads		Vangede				

Lyngby-Taarbæk Municipality

Name	Image	Neighbourhood	Coordinates	Created	Streets	Landmarks
Jernbanepladsen		Kongens Lyngby				Lyngby Station
Lyngby Torv		Kongens Lyngby				Lyngby Town Hall
Sorgenfri Torv		Sorgenfri				
Ulrikkenborg Plads		Ulrikkenborg				Lyngby Station
Virum Torv		Virum				

== See also ==
- List of parks and open spaces in Copenhagen
