= Israels Plads =

Public square in Copenhagen, Denmark

Coordinates: 55.6830°N 12.5684°E

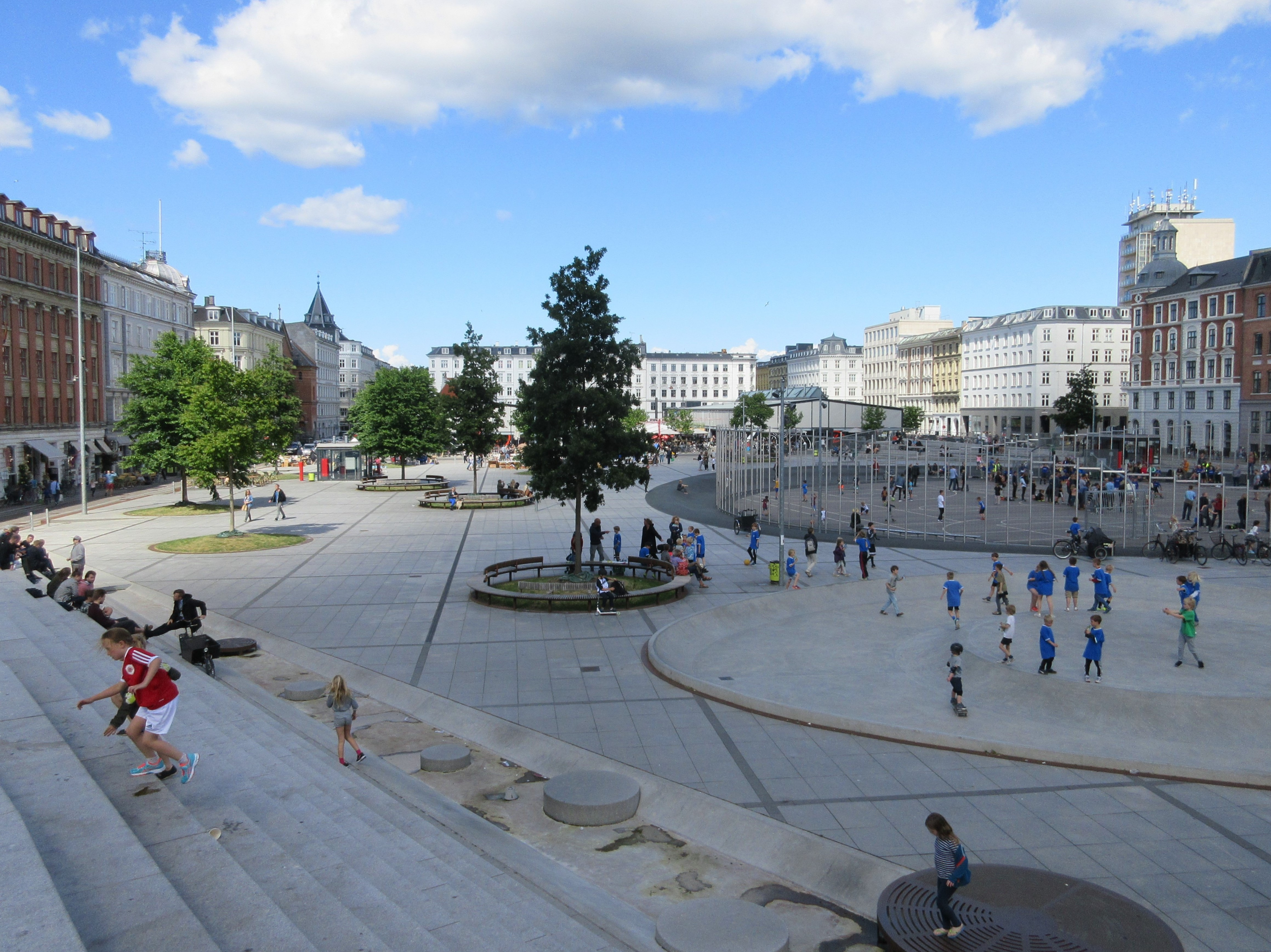
Israels Plads

Israels Plads (literally Israel's Square) is a large public square in central Copenhagen, Denmark, located in the area between Nørreport station and The Lakes. Its northern part hosts a market (with two market halls since 2011). Its southern part was extensively redesigned in 2014, with transition into the adjacent Ørsted Park.

== History ==
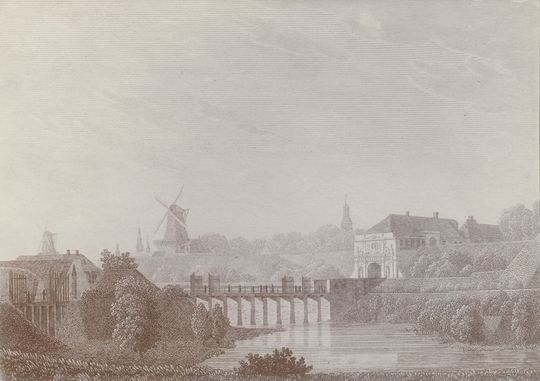
The site before the ramparts were decommissioned

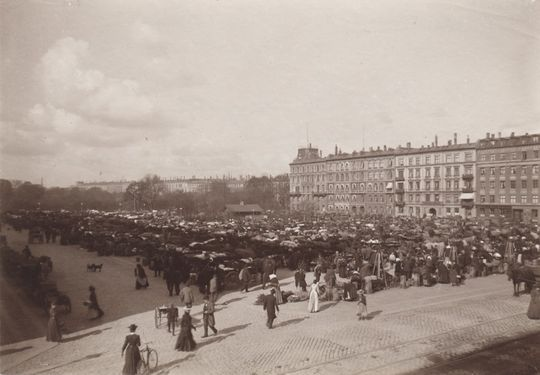
Market day

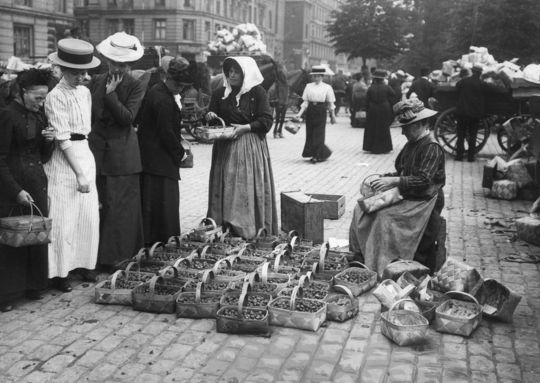
Amager Ladies selling strawberries

=== Background ===
The square is located in the area which was released after Copenhagen's Bastioned Fortifications were decommissioned in the second half of the 19th century. Until then the area had remained largely undeveloped due to the enforcement of a no-built zone outside the city walls.

=== The Greengroceer's Market ===
A vegetable market, Grønttorvet, opened at Vendersgade on 26 April 1889 after the market activities had been discontinued at Christianshavns Torv.

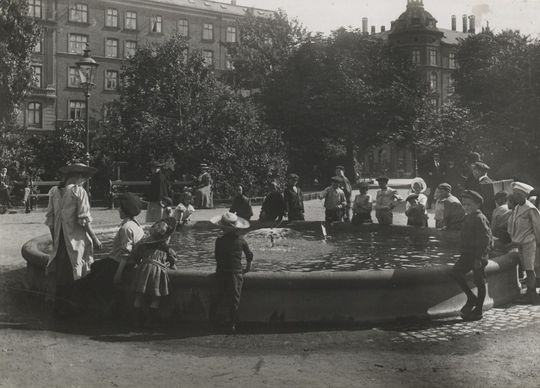
Children gathering at the fountain in Hundetorvet

=== Expansion and move ===
The northern part of today's Israels Plads, between Vendersgade and Frederiksborggade, was originally not part of Grønttorvet. It had a fountain and was known as Hundetorvet (literally Dog Square), presumably because it was popular with people walking their dog. In 1913, the space was incorporated into the market area.

The market at Grønttorvet closed when the new vegetable market in Valby was inaugurated on 1 October 1958.

Grønttorvet was renamed Israels Plads on 11 October 1968, the 25th anniversary of Nazi persecution of Jews in Denmark.

== Buildings ==
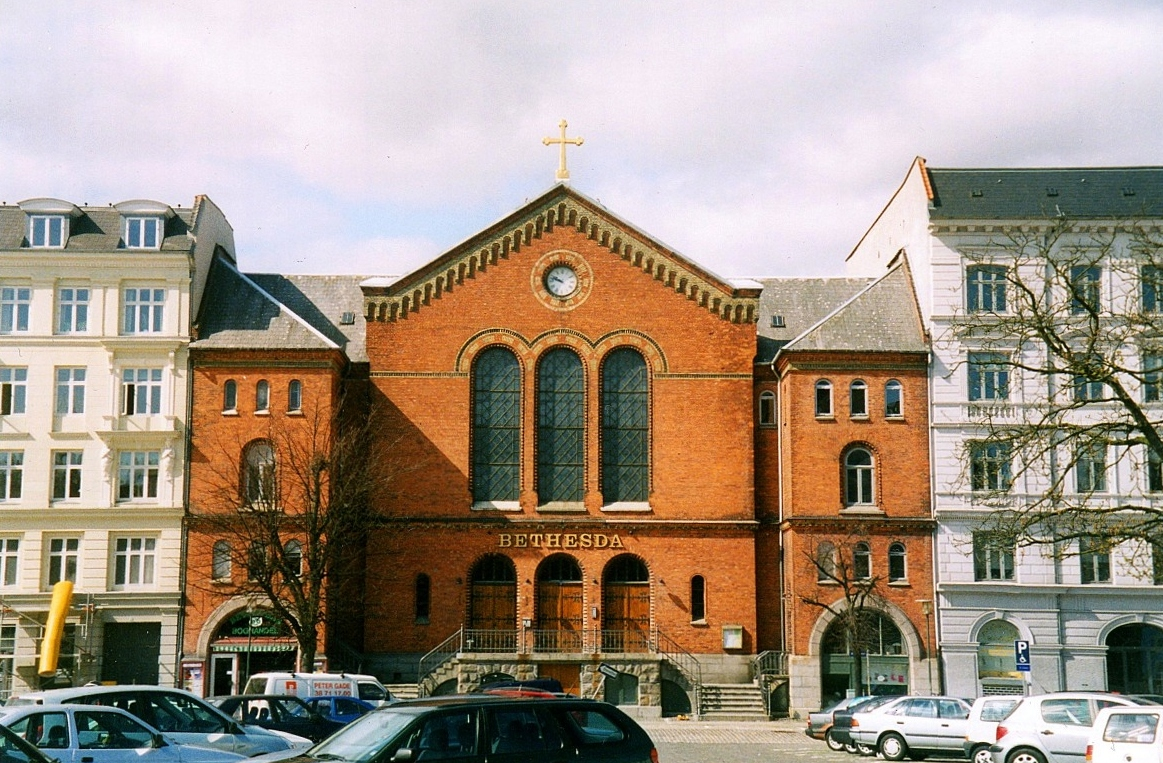
Bethesda at 17 Rømersgade

The most distinctive building which faces the square is the mission house Bethesda, at 17 Rømersgade, which was completed by the architect Ludvig Knudsen for the Inner Mission in 1882. Most of the other buildings facing the square are apartment buildings built for the upper middle class in the 1870s and 1880s. An example is 1–5 Rømersgade which was designed by Julius Bagger for Hans Hansen, better known as Hellig-Hansen, a prominent developer of the time who later built the entertainment venues National and Dagmar Theatre before he went bankrupt in 1884. The buildings have rich stucco decorations.

== Torvehallerne ==
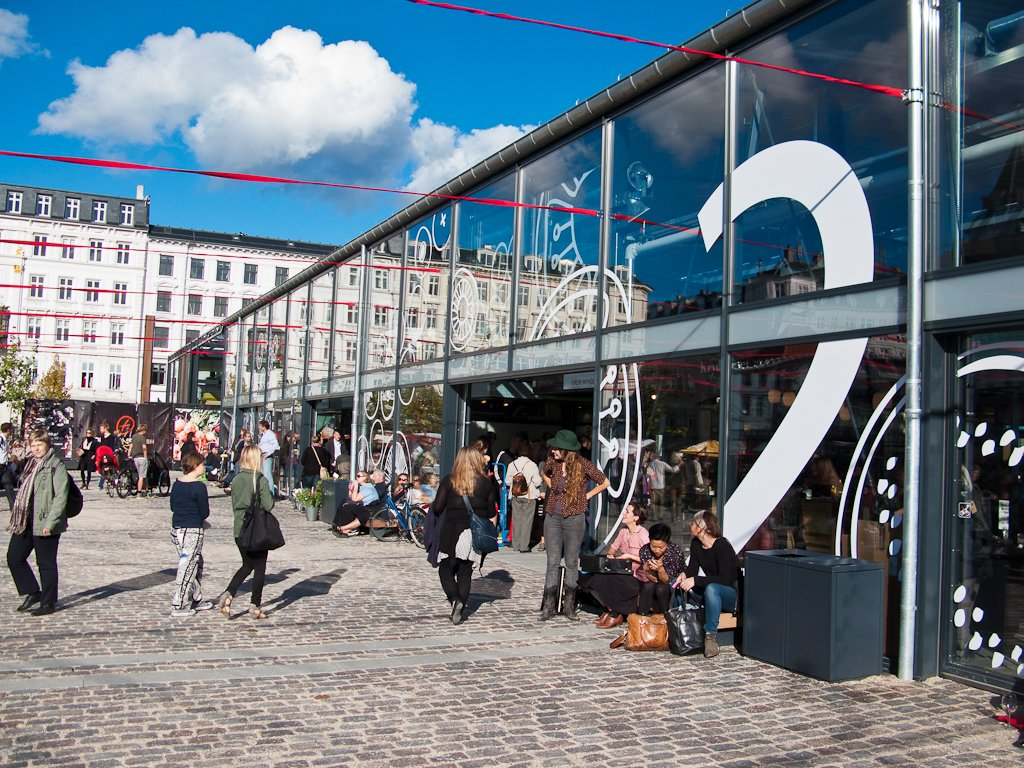
The covered market

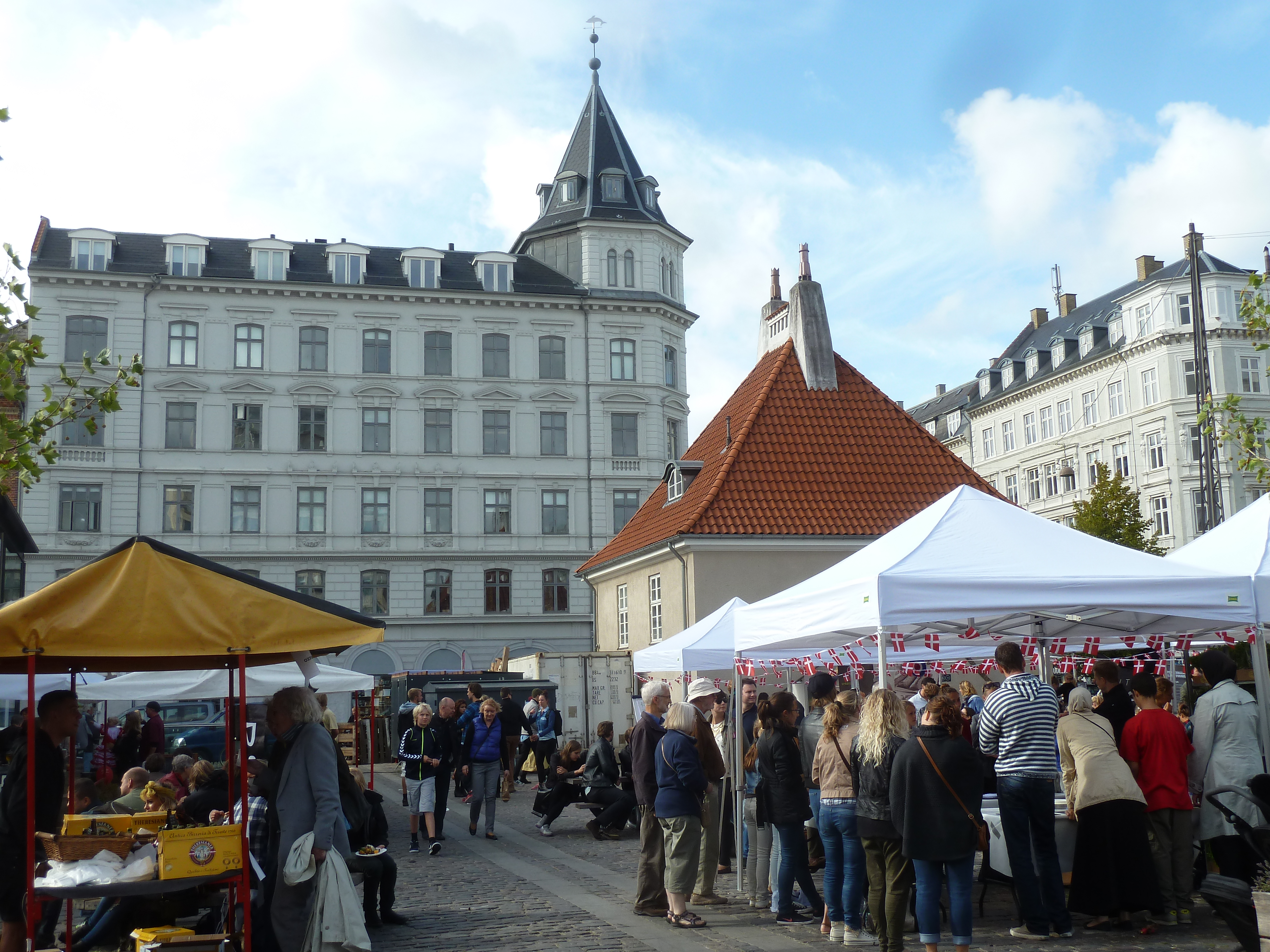
Israels Plads

The two market halls are each 50 meters (165 feet) long and 24.2 meters (80 feet) wide. They stand parallel at a distance of 23 meters (75 feet), so that there is still an open-air vegetable and flower market in between. The simple and transparent halls were designed by Hans Peter Hagens. The company, which was founded specifically to build and operate the halls, filed for bankruptcy during the 2008 financial crisis. The market halls were opened in September 2011 after the project was taken over by the private property development company Jeudan.

The following groceries are available at the market: open faced sandwiches; meat products, including rack of lamb “Lammekrone”; seafood, including fish products, prawns and lobsters; mozzarella; chocolate, dragée and ice cream. There are free public toilets beside the food market.

== Redesign of the southern part 2014 ==
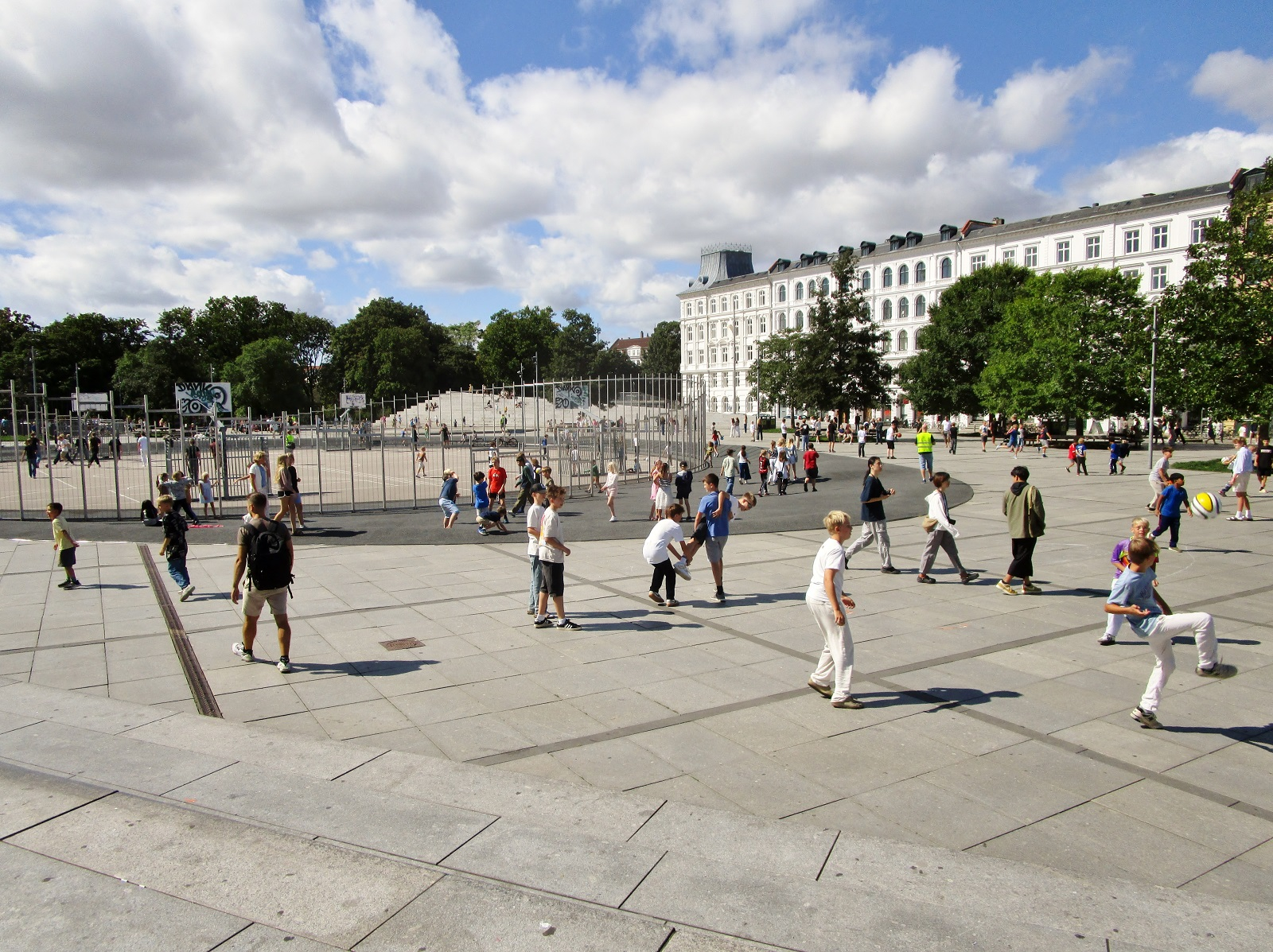
Israels Plads during a school break (2023)

Until 2014, the southern portion was a desolate asphalt expanse used for parking, with the occasional flea market. In 2008 there was a design competition for the refurbishment of this part, which was won by the architectural firm Cobe. The project team included Sweco architects, Birk Nielsens landscape architects, sculptor Morten Stræde and engineering firm Niras.

The design idea is that of a flying carpet. The light granite surface rises above street level towards the street (and falls again), offers tribune-like seating in these areas and conceals the underground car park built below. There are public skateboarding areas and a streetball cage on the square, but football and basketball can also be played, which are used by three adjacent schools as break and open spaces. Trees and an artificial watercourse create a creative connection to the adjacent park.

The cost was estimated in 2008 at at least 60 million Danish kroners. They were funded by the city and the Oticon Fund. The implementation of the project was delayed due to a dispute with the owner of an underground parking garage, but construction finally started in 2012. The newly designed square was completed in 2014.

=== Award ===
Israels Plads was nominated as an "Archdaily 2018 Building of the Year Award Finalist" in the "Public Architecture" category.

== See also ==
- List of squares in Copenhagen
