= Ladegården, Copenhagen =

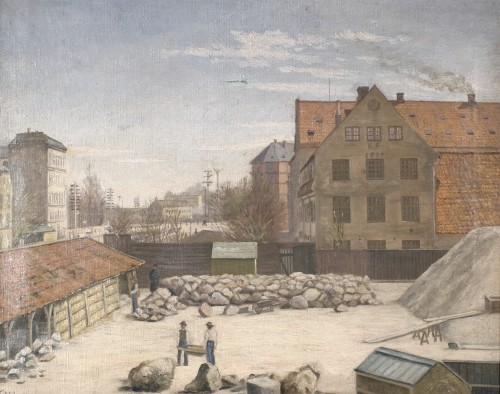
Ladegården in 1892

Ladegården, or Københavns Ladegård (lit. 'Copenhagen's Barnyard'), was established as a farm under Copenhagen Castle by Christian IV in 1623. It was located roughly at the site of the present-day Radio House on Rosenørns Allé in Copenhagen, Denmark. The complex with later additions later served a range of different functions before it was demolished in the early 1920.

== History ==
Christian III built a farm referred to as Ladegården about which hardly anything is known at Nyby outside Copenhagen 1548. The building later associated with the name was established by Christian IV in 1623. The estate covered all of present-day Frederiksberg Municipality. Its purpose was to provide produce for the royal household, grazing for its livestock and feed for the royal mews. A building g with room for 500 pieces of cattle was destroyed in a storm in 1628 and a new, three-storey brick building was constructed in its place. The complex was surrounded by bastions and a moat that was fed with water from the Ladegård Canal as well as Rosenåen, a branch which emptied into the sea at Kalvebod Beach. The farm was never an economic success and some of the land was sold off to a group of Dutch farmers from Amager. The building was destroyed during the Swedish siege of Copenhagen in 1658-59.

The ruin was purchased by Christoffer Gabel in the earlu 1660s. In 1710, it was converted into a military hospital. During the outbreak of plague 1711-13, it was used as a plague hospital alongside nearby Vodroffgård, housing one hundred patients at a time.

On 27 June 1723, the director of the Military Hospital Barracks applied for permission to establish a spinning mill and weaver at Ladegården. Shortly thereafter plans arose to transform the building into a workhouse.

In 1768, Ladegården was sold to the City of Copenhagen. The residents of Sankt Hans Hospital, a mental institution based in another former plague hospital, which was located at Kalvebod Beach, was then transferred to the Ladegården site but the institution kept its name. The two facilities co-existed at Ladegården until 1816 when Sankt Hans Hospital was moved to Bistrup at Roskilde.

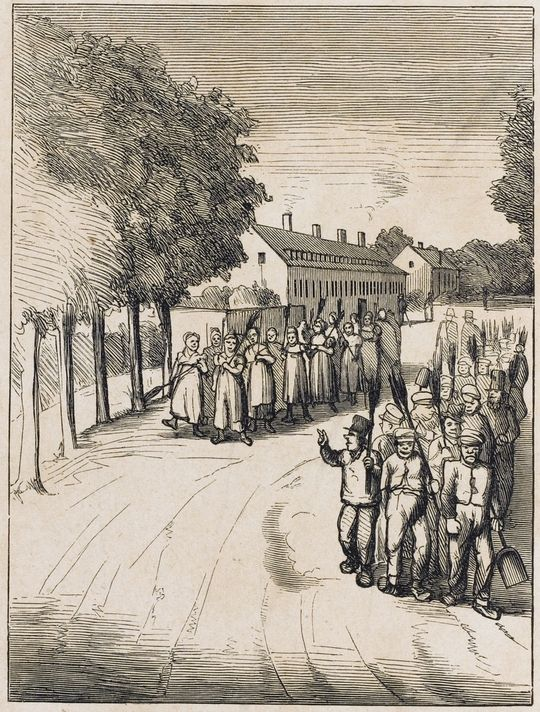
1880:Residents of Ladegården with brooms on the way to town to work

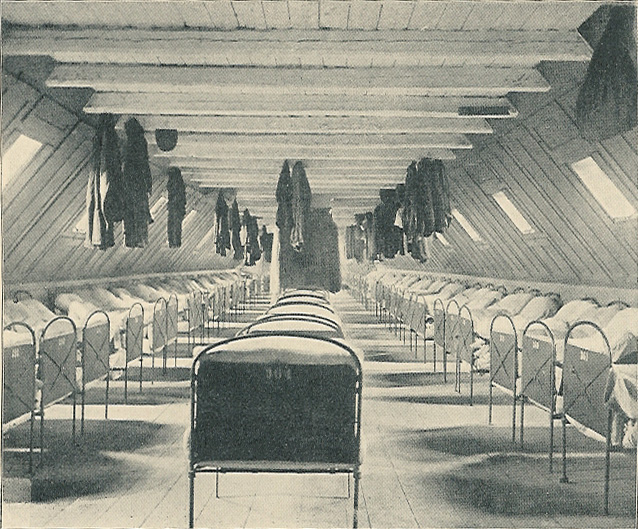
Dormitory

Ladegården was once again left unused for until it was once again used as a workhouse from 1822. In 1834, it was expanded with a penal labour facility. In 1908, the indigent residents moved to the newly established institution Sundholm on Amager. The buildings were demolished in connection with extension of Rosenørns Allé in the 1920s. The Radio House was built on the western part of the site. The gore between Åboulevard, Rosenørns Allé and Julius Thomsens Gade was transferred from Frederiksberg to Copenhagen Municipality and redeveloped with housing.
