= Dan Turèll =

Danish writer

- Born: March 19, 1946; Vangede, Denmark
- Died: October 15, 1993 (aged 47); Copenhagen, Denmark
- Occupation: Writer

Dan Turèll (March 19, 1946 – October 15, 1993), affectionately nicknamed "Onkel Danny" (English: Uncle Danny), was a popular Danish writer with notable influence on Danish literature. His work crossed a number of genres including autobiography, beat literature and crime fiction.

Turèll was born 19 March 1946 in Vangede on the outskirts of Copenhagen. Much of his works were partially autobiographical and inspired by his hometown, though is portrayal of Vesterbro is often considered romantic rather than realistic. His work often references themes Americanisation, drawing on the beat generation and the teachings of Donald Duck. Turèll published much of his material himself, especially early in his career. He wrote in both Danish and English and has been translated into Dutch, Estonian, French, German, Norwegian, Swedish and Serbian.

He died from esophageal cancer and is buried at Assistens Cemetery. On Sunday March 19, 2006, on what would have been his 60th birthday, part of the town square of Halmtorvet in the Kødbyen area of Copenhagen was named Onkel Dannys Plads (English: 'Uncle Danny's Square') in his honour. The square Dan Turèlls Plads in his native Vangede was named for him on 9 March 2007.

== Selected bibliography ==
Dan Turèll was a highly prolific writer, contributing to numerous anthologies within his time and collections of his works continued to be arranged after his death. In addition to his literary work, he wrote a vast number of articles and essays for newspapers and various magazines. As a result, the following bibliography is in no way complete. Danish literary critic and writer, Lars Bukdahl, said that Turèll "only lived to the age of 47, and it is as though he knew he had to hurry".

=== Cut-up literature ===
- Changes of Light, 1970
- Occult Confessions, 1970
- Speed of Light, 1970.
- Opsvulmede byer i sigtekornet flagrende skud i bevidstheden (English: Inflated Cities in the Sight Fluttering Shots in the Consciousness), 1972.
- Sidste forestilling bevidstløse trancebilleder af eksploderende spejltricks igennem flyvende tidsmaskine af smeltende elektriske glasfotos (English: Last Performance of Unconscious Trance Images of Exploding Mirror Tricks through Flying Time Machine of Melting Electrical Glass Photos), 1972
- Feuilleton 1: Faraway Signs (English: Serial 1: Faraway Signs), 1972
- Feuilleton 2: Laser Time Switch (English: Serial 2: Laser Time Switch), 1972
- Feuilleton 3: Filmen synker igennem Deres øjne (English: Serial 3: The Film Sinks Through Your Eyes), 1972
- Feuilleton 4: The Edison Kinetogram (English: Serial 4: The Edison Kinetogram), 1972
- Feuilleton 5: It's Just Another Whistle Stop (English: Serial 5: It's Just Another Whistle Stop), 1973
- Feuilleton 6: Not Fade Away ... (English: Serial 6: Not Fade Away ...), 1973
- Feuilleton 7: Deres kodeskrift under Dobbelt Sol (English: Serial 7: Your Cipher under Double Sun), 1973
- Feuilleton 8: Strangers in the Night (English: Serial 8: Strangers in the Night), 1978

=== Novels ===
- Dét døgn, da - (English: That Day, When -), 1992

==== The Murder Series ====
The so-called Mord-serie (English: Murder Series) consists of ten novels and two volumes of short stories in the "American" school of crime fiction, known from writers like Raymond Chandler. All twelve volumes follow the same protagonist, a nameless detective / reporter, a freelance writer for a fictitious Copenhagen newspaper, plainly called Bladet (English: The Paper). In each novel the protagonist is hurled into a new murder mystery, often along recurring characters, centrally among them Politiinspektør Ehlers (English: Chief Inspector Ehlers). The stories are self contained, but settings, relations, and characters evolve as the series progress.

The series primarily takes place in an alternate version of the borough of Vesterbro in Copenhagen, which serves as a backdrop for considerably more criminal endeavours than real life will probably ever match. Also certain aspects of the city's geography has been altered. Certain streets lie differently, for instance.

- Mord i mørket (English: Murder in the Dark), 1981
- Mord i Rodby (English: Murder in Rodby), 1981
- Mord ved Runddelen (English: Murder by the Circle), 1983
- Mord på Malta (English: Murder on Malta), 1983
- Mord i marts (English: Murder in March), 1984
- Mord i september (English: Murder in September), 1984
- Mord i myldretiden (English: Murder during Rush Hour), 1985
- Mord på møntvaskeriet og andre kriminalhistorier (English: Murder in the Launderette and Other Crime Stories), short stories, 1986
- Mord i rendestenen (English: Murder in the Gutter), 1987
- Mord i Paradis (English: Murder in Paradise), 1988
- Mord på medierne (English: Murder on the Media), 1988
- Mord på markedet (English: Murder on the Market), 1989
- Mord i San Francisco (English: Murder in San Francisco), 1989

=== Poetry ===
- Vibrationer (English: Vibrations), 1966
- 40 ark (English: 40 Sheets), 1969
- 40 linier (English: 40 Lines), 1969
- Manuskripter I: Øjne/Further instructions (English: Manuscripts I: Eyes/Further Instructions), 1970
- Manuskripter II: Af beskrivelsen af det/Hvidt lys (English: Manuscripts II: From the Description of It/White Light), 1970
- Manuskripter om hvad som helst (English: Manuscripts about anything), 1971.
- Bevægelser, formålsløst cirklende (English: Movements, pointlessly circling), 1971
- Dobbeltskrift (English: Double Writing), 1973 – with Peter Laugesen
- Onkel Danny's dadaistiske discjockey djellaba jazzjungle joysticks (English: Uncle Danny's Dadaistic Disc-Jockey Djellaba Jazz-Jungle Joysticks), 1973
- Sekvens af Manjana – den endeløse sang flimrende igennem hudens pupiller (English: Sequence of Manjana, the Endless Song Flickering through the Pupils of the Skin), 1973
- Lissom (English: Like), 1973
- Digte m. m. (English: Poems and more), 1973 – with Peter Laugesen, Jens Smærup Sørensen, & Henning Mortensen
- Onkel Danny's drivende dansende dirrende dinglende daskende dryppende danske dåse-digte (English: Uncle Danny's Driving Dancing Dithering Dangling Dawdling Dripping Danish Dried Poems), 1974
- Onkel Danny's deliristiske jukebox jitterbug (English: Uncle Danny's Delirious Jukebox Jitterbug), 1974
- Karma Cowboy (English: Karma Cowboy), 1974; shortened version released in 1983
- Drive-in digte: non-stop neon-nat lys-avis (English: Drive-In Poems: Non-Stop Neon-Night Electric Newspaper), 1976
- Nytår i Rom (English: New Year in Rome), 1976
- Live-show feed-back: 5 sæt af Bøgernes Bog (English: Live-Show Feed-Back: 5 Sets of the Book of Books), 1976
- 3-D digte (English: 3-D Poems), 1977
- Storby-Blues (English: Big City Blues), 1977
- Vesterbrobilleder (English: Images of Vesterbro), 1977 – with photos by Kurt Lesser
- Onkel Danny's små sorte sitrende swingende saxsoli sæbeboble-sange (English: Uncle Danny's Small Sable Shuddering Swinging Sax Solos Soapbubble Songs), 1978
- Onkel Danny's rullende rallende regnvejrs ragtime rhapsodi (English: Uncle Danny's Rolling Rollicking Rainstorm Ragtime Rhapsody), 1979
- Døgn-digte: udvalgte digte fra 70'erne (English: 24 Hour Poems: Selected Poems from the 70s), 1979
- Ulysses' spejl (English: Ulysses' Mirror), 1981 – with Henrik Nordbrandt, illustrated by Barry Lereng Wilmont
- Alhambra blues (English: Alhambra Blues), 1983
- Kom forbi: sange & recitationer (English: Drop By: Songs & Recitals), 1984
- Jazz-digte: et udvalg 1966–1986 (English: Jazz Poems: A Selection 1966–1986), 1986 – illustrated by Peter Hentze
- Forklædt til genkendelighed: sange, digte & recitationer (English: Recognizably Disguised: Songs, Poems & Recitals), 1988
- Himalaya Hilton (English: Himalaya Hilton), 1991
- Gud & Gokke (English: The Lord & Hardy), 1992
- Tja-a Cha-Cha (English: Tja-a Cha-Cha), 1993
- Udvalgte digte 1: 1969–1974 (English: Selected Poems 1: 1969–1974), 2003
- Udvalgte digte 2: 1973–1993 (English: Selected Poems 2: 1973–1993), 2004

=== Prose ===
- Områder af skiftende tæthed og tomhed (English: Areas of Alternating Density and Void), 1970
- Film (English: Film), 1973 – with Henrik Have
- Vangede billeder (English: Images of Vangede), memoirs, 1975
- Ezra Pound/William S. Burroughs/Lou Reed: 3 medie-montager (English: Ezra Pound/William S. Burroughs/Lou Reed: 3 Media Montages), 1975
- Rockens rødder. Medie-montager II (English: The Roots of Rock. Media Montages II), 1975
- SuperShowStjerneStøv. Medie-Montager III (English: SuperShowStarDust. Media Montages III), 1976
- Onkel Danny fortæller (English: Uncle Danny Relates), memoirs, 1976
- Af Livets Laboratorium. Medie-Montager IV (English: From the Lab of Life. Media Montages IV), 1977
- MenneskeMyteMaskinen. Medie-Montager V (English: ManMythMachine. Media Montages V), 1977
- Livets karrusel (English: The Merry-Go-Round of Life), 1977
- Onkel Danny fortæller videre (English: Uncle Danny Relates Further), memoirs, 1978
- Onkel Sams sønner. Medie-Montager VI (English: Uncle Sam's Sons. Media Montages VI), 1978
- Alverdens vampyrer: første forestilling på Grusomhedens Teater eller En idés rejse fra 5000 f. Kristus til i dag (English: All the World's Vampires: First Performance of the Theatre of Cruelty or The Journey of an Idea from 5000 b. Christ until Today), 1978
- Amerikanske ansigter: udvalgte artikler fra 70'erne (English: American Faces: Selected Articles from the 70's), 1979
- Møde i Garda: en fortælling i forbigående (English: Meeting in Garda: A Story in Passing), 1979
- Dan Turèll i byen: 50 historier af Københavns-krøniken fortalt fra dag til dag (English: Dan Turèll on the Town: 50 Stories from the Copenhagen Chronicle told from Day to Day), 1979 – illustrated by Peder Nyman
- Onkel Danny fortæller i timevis (English: Uncle Danny Relates for Hours on End), 1979
- Dan Turèll – et udvalg omkring en generation (English: Dan Turèll – A Selection About a Generation), 1981
- Onkel Danny fortæller på talløse opfordringer (English: Uncle Danny Relates by Countless Requests), memoirs, 1982
- Dan Turèll i byen igen: 50 historier af Københavns-krøniken fortalt fra dag til dag (English: Dan Turèll on the Town Again: 50 Stories from the Copenhagen Chronicle told from Day to Day), 1982 – illustrated by Peder Nyman
- Omkring på Brevduebanen (English: Around at the Carrier Pigeon Track), 1982
- Dansk dragefestival 1964–1984 (English: Danish Kite Festival 1964–1984), 1984 – with Bjarne Lynnerup
- Sort film: en privat dagbog omkring kriminalgenren (English: Film Noir: A Private Journal about the Crime Genre), 1984
- Shu-Bi-Dua – melodierne, teksterne, historien (English: Shu-Bi-Dua – the Melodies, the Lyrics, the Story), 1984 – essay by Turèll, note sheets and lyrics by Shu-Bi-Dua
- Dan Turèll i byen så det basker: 50 historier af Københavns-krøniken fortalt fra dag til dag (English: Dan Turèll on the Town with a Vengeance: 50 Stories from the Copenhagen Chronicle told from Day to Day), 1985 – illustrated by Peder Nyman
- Don Dobbeltliv og andre historier fra Stjernecaféen (English: Don Double-Life and Other Stories from Star Café), short stories, 1985
- Nekrolog – blues for -- (English: Necrologue – Blues for --, 1987 – illustrated by Peter Hentze
- Blues for Buddha (English: Blues for Buddha), 1988 – illustrated by Peter Hentze
- Dan Turèll i byen – i dén grad!: 50 historier af Københavns-krøniken fortalt fra dag til dag (English: Dan Turèll on the Town – and how!: 50 Stories from the Copenhagen Chronicle told from Day to Day), 1988 – illustrated by Peder Nyman
- As time goes by – :klip fra den fortsatte scrap-bog (English: As Time Goes By -: Cuts from the Continued Scrapbook), 1989
- Dan Turèll i byen – og i baggårdene: 50 historier af Københavns-krøniken fortalt fra dag til dag (English: Dan Turèll on the Town – and in the Backyards: 50 Stories from the Copenhagen Chronicle told from Day to Day), 1991
- Undervejs med Copenhagen All Stars: et jazzband på turné i Danmark (English: On the Road with Copenhagen All Stars: A Jazzband on Tour in Denmark), 1991
- Dan Turèll i byen – for sidste gang: 37 historier af Københavns-krøniken fortalt fra dag til dag (English: Dan Turèll on the Town – One Last Time: 37 Stories from the Copenhagen Chronicle told from Day to Day), 1994
- Just a gigolo: klip fra den store scrap-bog 1989–93 (English: Just a Gigolo: Cuts from the Great Scrapbook 1989–93), 1995
- En nat ved højttaleren med sprogets mikrofon: rariteter, 1964–79 (English: A Night by the Speaker with the Mic of Language: rarities, 1964–79), 2003
- Medie-montager: greatest hits (English: Media Montages: Greatest Hits), 2003
- Charlie Parker i Istedgade: tekster om jazz (English: Charlie Parker in Istedgade: Texts about jazz), 2006

=== Spoken Word Recordings ===
- Dansk tale: to monologer (English: Danish Speech: Two Monologues), MC, 1981
- Dan Turèll & Sølvstjernerne (English: Dan Turèll & the Silver Stars), LP, 1991; CD, 1993 – with music by Sølvstjernerne
- Pas på pengene! (English: Watch the Money), CD, 1993 – with music by Halfdan E
- Glad i åbningstiden (English: Happy During Opening Hours), CD, 1996 – with music by Halfdan E
- Dan Turèll & Sølvstjernerne vender tilbage (English: Dan Turèll & the Silver Stars Return), CD, 2004 – with music by Sølvstjernerne

=== Works in English ===
- The Total-Copy System, poetry, 1971.
- A Draft of XXX Space Cantos, crossover poetry, 1972
- Here Comes Your 19th Nervous Breakdown/Stones: Last Words 1972, poem, 1973
- Another Draft of Space Cantos, crossover poetry, 1974
- A Third Draft of Space Cantos, crossover poetry, 1974
- Feuilleton 8: Strangers in the Night (English: Serial 8: Strangers in the Night), 1978
- And all that jazz: Copenhagen Jazz Festival (English: And All That Jazz: Copenhagen Jazz Festival), photobook; text in both Danish and English – photos by Gorm Valentin

== Adaptations ==
- His novels, Mord i mørket (English: Murder in the Dark) and Mord i Paradis (English: Murder in Paradise) both from 1981 were made into film in 1986 and 1988 respectively.
- In 2006 a musical theatre production, Onkel Danny, was made about his life.
