= Nikolaj Plads =

Public square in Copenhagen, Denmark

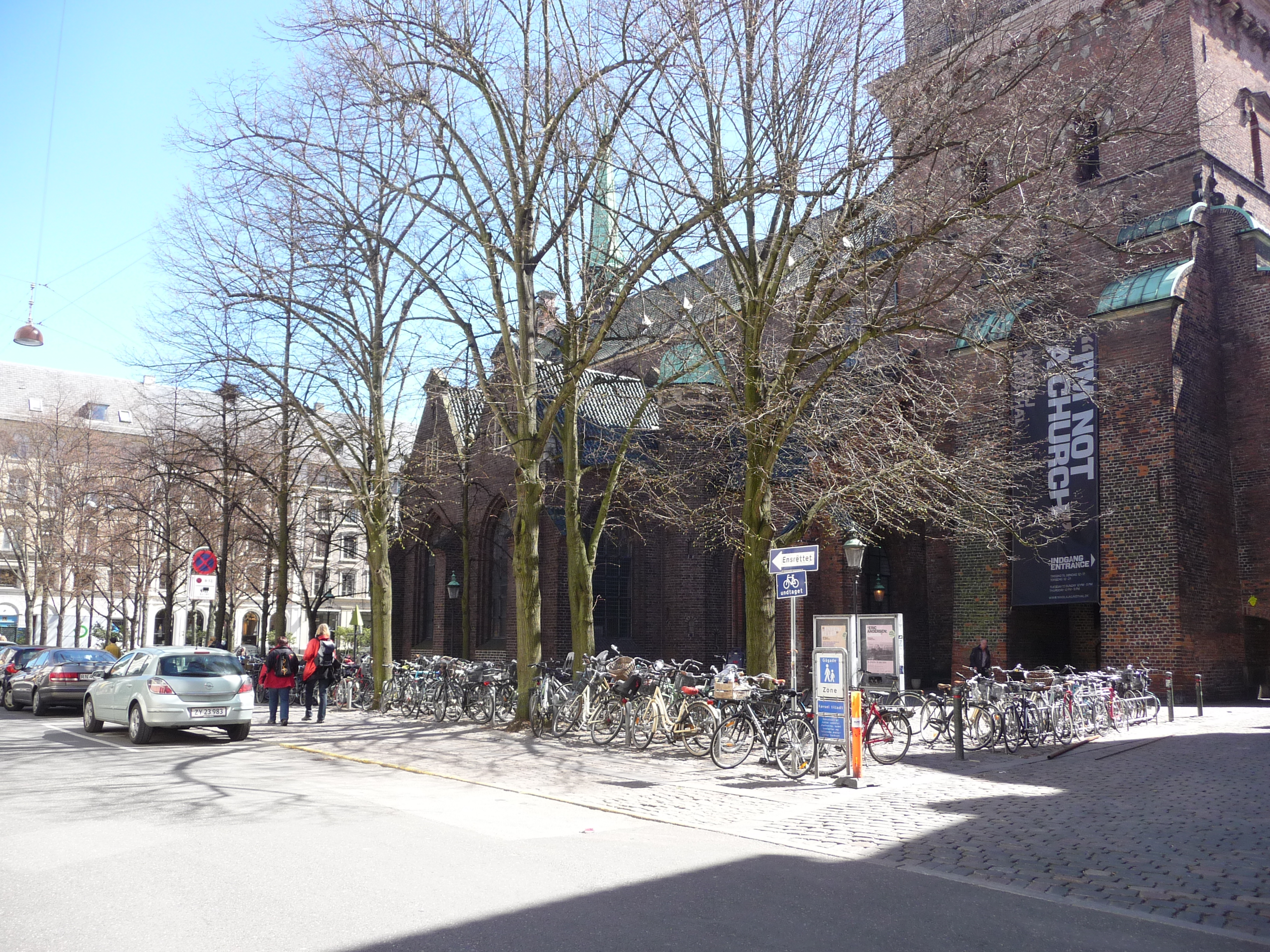
- Nikolaj Plads with the former church
- Interactive map of Nikolaj Plads
- Location: Indre By, Copenhagen, Denmark
- Postal code: 1067
- Nearest metro station: Kongens Nytorv
- Coordinates: 55°40′43.68″N 12°34′52.32″E

Nikolaj Plads (lit. "Nicolas' Square") is a public square located at the foot of the former St Nicolas' Church (Danish: Nikolaj Kirke), just off Strøget, in the Old Town of Copenhagen, Denmark. Most of the buildings that line the square date from the rebuilding of the surrounding neighbourhood in the years after the Copenhagen Fire of 1795. The square is a quiet alternative to the much busier squares Amagertorv and Højbro Plads. The former church houses an exhibition space and a restaurant with outdoor service and a small playground is also located at the site.

== History ==
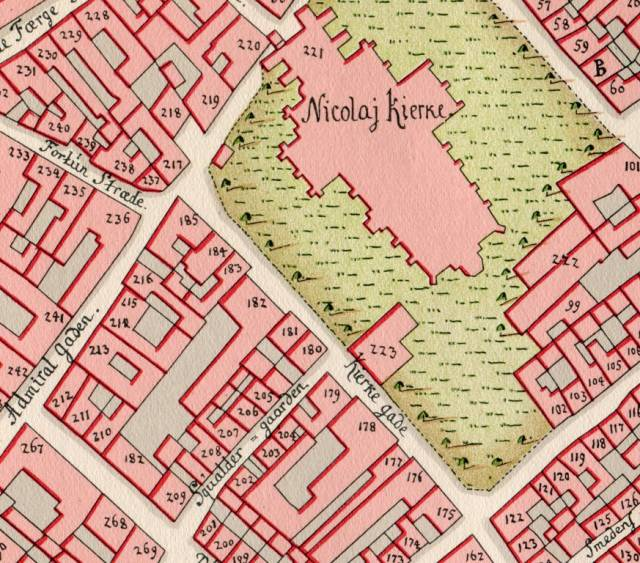
The site seen on Gedde's district map of Copenhagen

St. Nicolas' Church was established in the 13th century. A graveyard was located on its eastern side. Other properties at the site belonged to Church of Our Lady, Roskilde Cathedral and Our Lady's Abbey in Sorø. The graveyard lay open until it was closed off from the surrounding city with a fence following the plague outbreak of 1711.

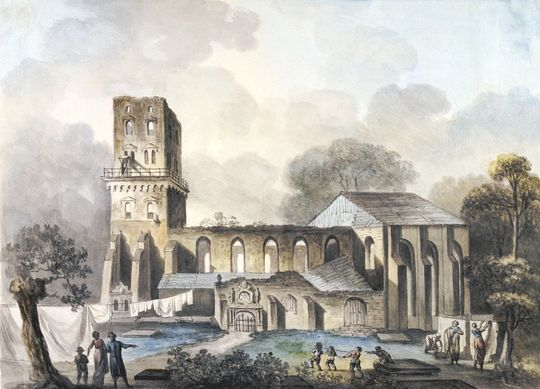
The church ruin painted by C. A. Lorenzen in about 1800

The church and the surrounding neighbourhood were hit hard by the Copenhagen Fire of 1795. The first houses on the square were rebuilt shortly after the fire but initial plans to rebuild the church were not realized and the church building was instead pulled down except for its large tower. The congregation was dissolved in 1804 and the graveyard was also closed down. The Fire Brigade took over the church tower in 1807 and converted the ruin into a proper fire station in 1820–23.

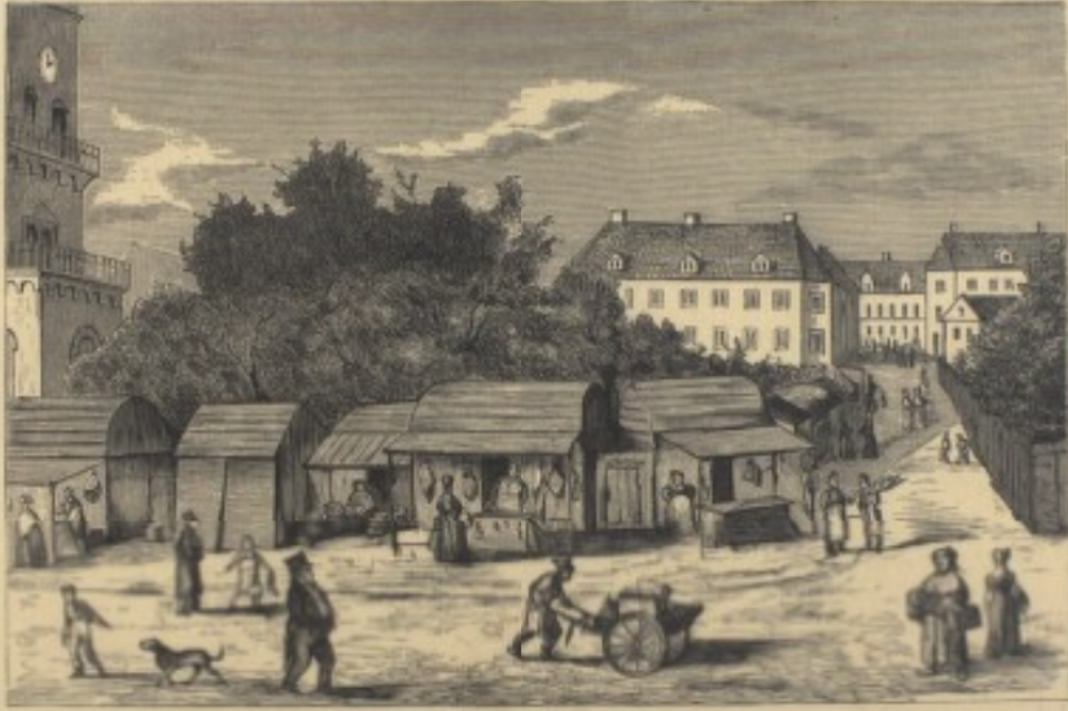
P. C. Klæstrup: The Meat Market at Nikolaj Plads

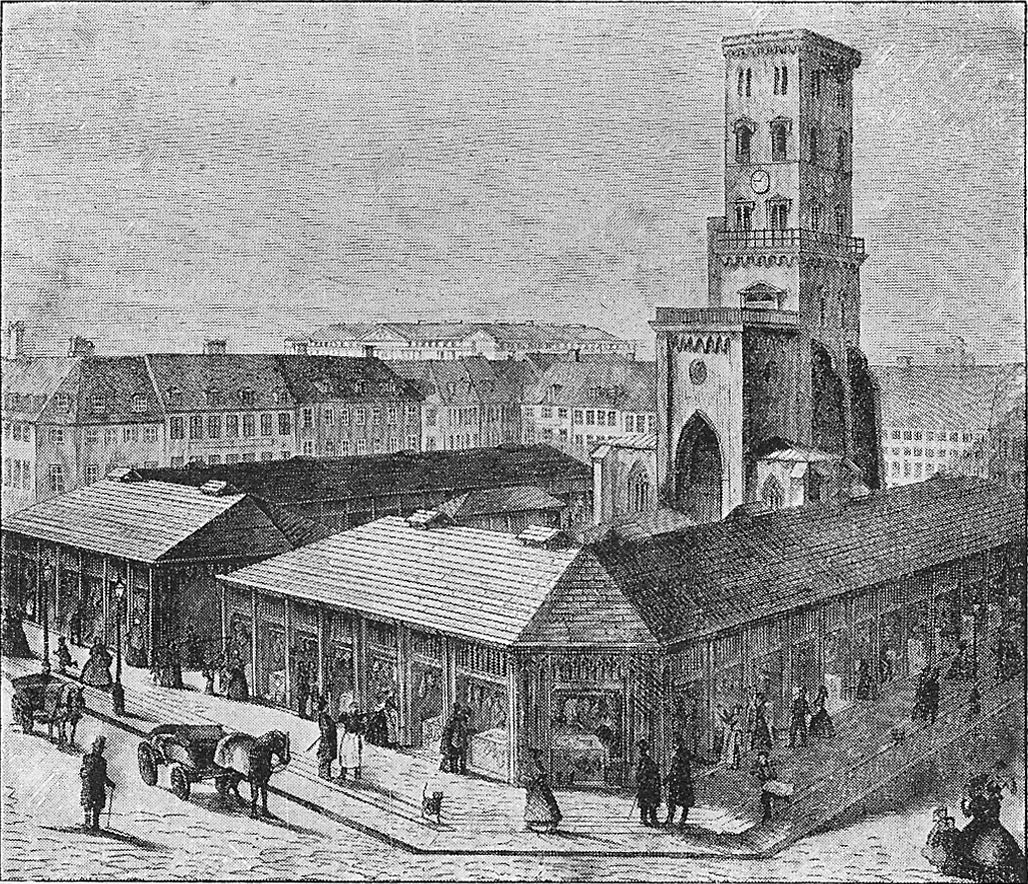
The new market stalls in about 1850

In 1810, the butchers on Højbro Plads received permission to move their market stalls to the site of the former graveyard. Especially on warm days, the market activities resulted in a foul odor and the conditions were described as a potential health threat in 1818. The architect Christian Frederik Hansen made a proposal for a market building on the square in the 1820s but it was not realized. In 1842, the number of market stalls had grown to 82. The debate about better conditions for the market trade resurged and a complex of market building design by Peter Heinrich Christoph Hagemann was built in 1834–46. It was made of cast iron and contained 68 large and 10 small shops. The market stalls ran along the streets Lille Kongensgade, Nikolajgade, Vingårdsstræde and Admiralgade.

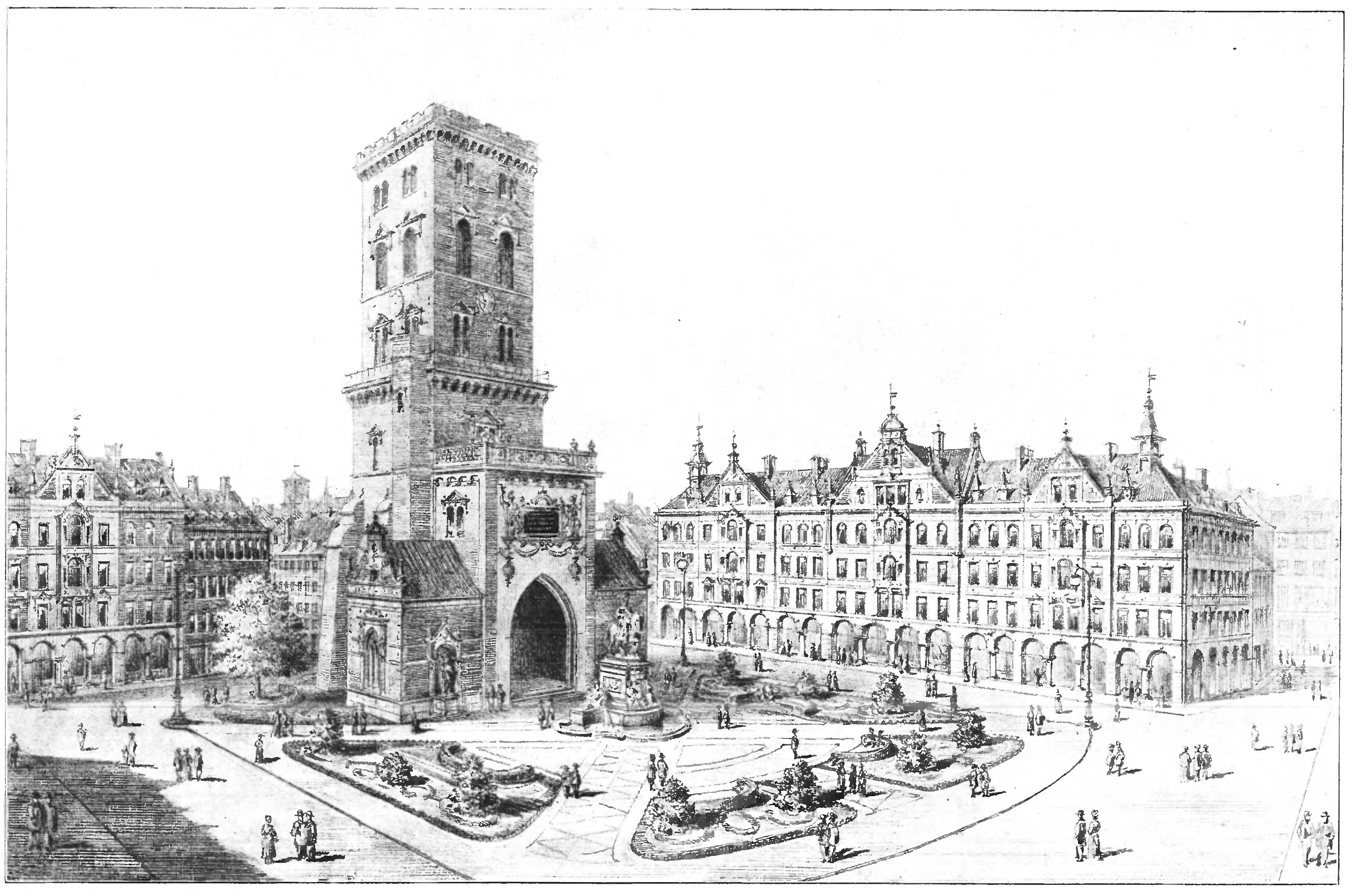
Dahlerup's proposal for the renovation of the church ruin and square

The butchers that faced the street sold meat of superior quality while the market stalls that faced the central yard, colloquially known as "The Stomach" (Danish: Maven), sold second-rate, "black label" meat. The market stalls remained in use until they were pulled down in the early 1900s.

In 1896, Vilhelm Dahlerup made a proposal for the adaptation of the church tower and square into a monument but it was not realized. At the initiative of Carl Jacobsen it was instead decided to rebuild the church. The market building remained in use until it was demolished when the new church building was inaugurated in 1917. More recent changes include the construction of a small playground.

== Notable buildings and structures ==
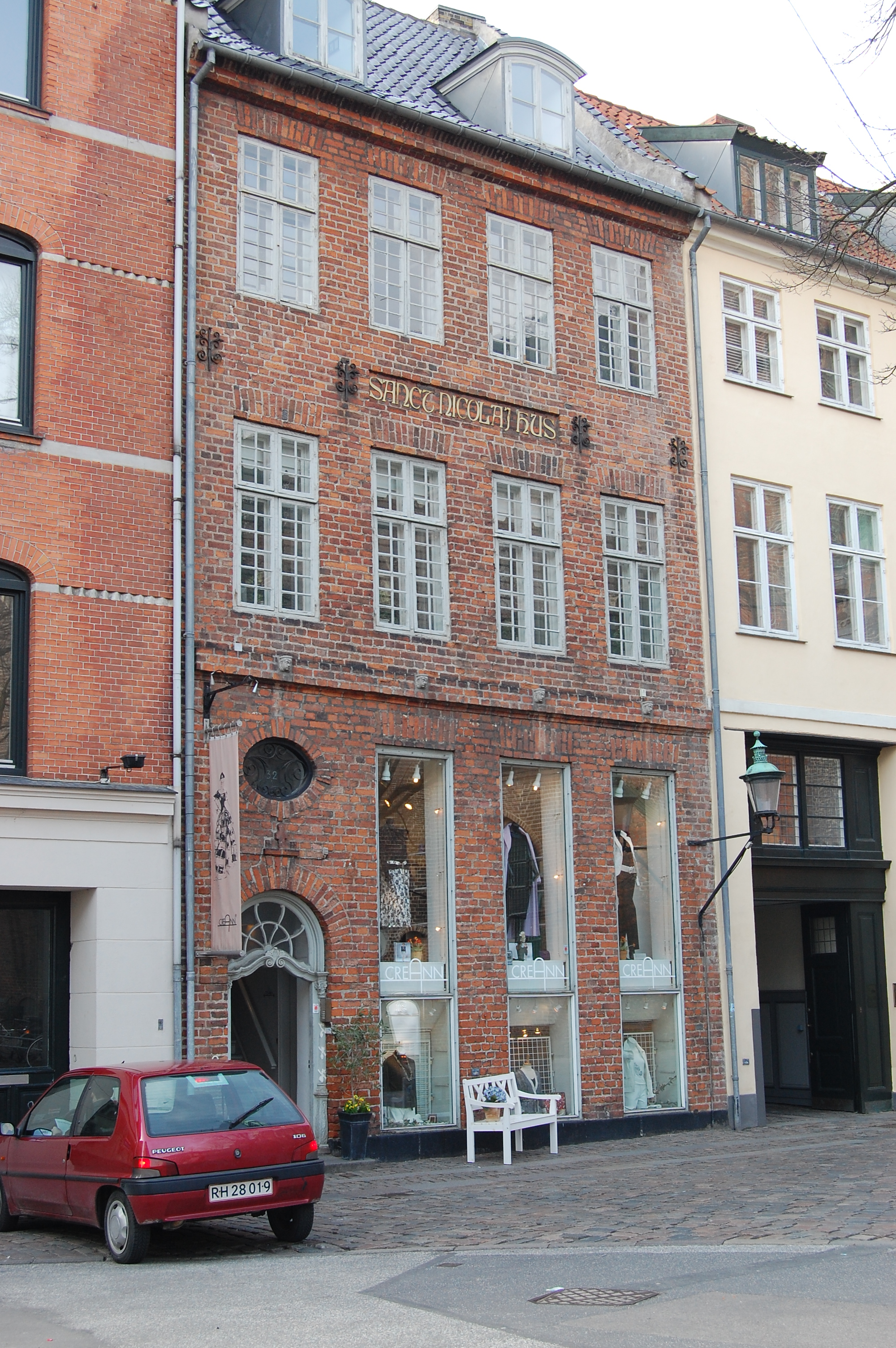
No. 30: Sankt Nicolai Hus

No. 30 is a former school for poor children operated by St. Nicolas' Parish. It was built by Andreas Hallander and Andreas Kirkerup. Andreas Hallander was also responsible for the construction of the neighbouring Sankt Nikolai Hus at No. 32 and No. 28 at the corner with Lille Kirkestræde (No. 1). No. 23, No. 25 and No. 27 also date from the years after the Fire of 1795 and are listed.

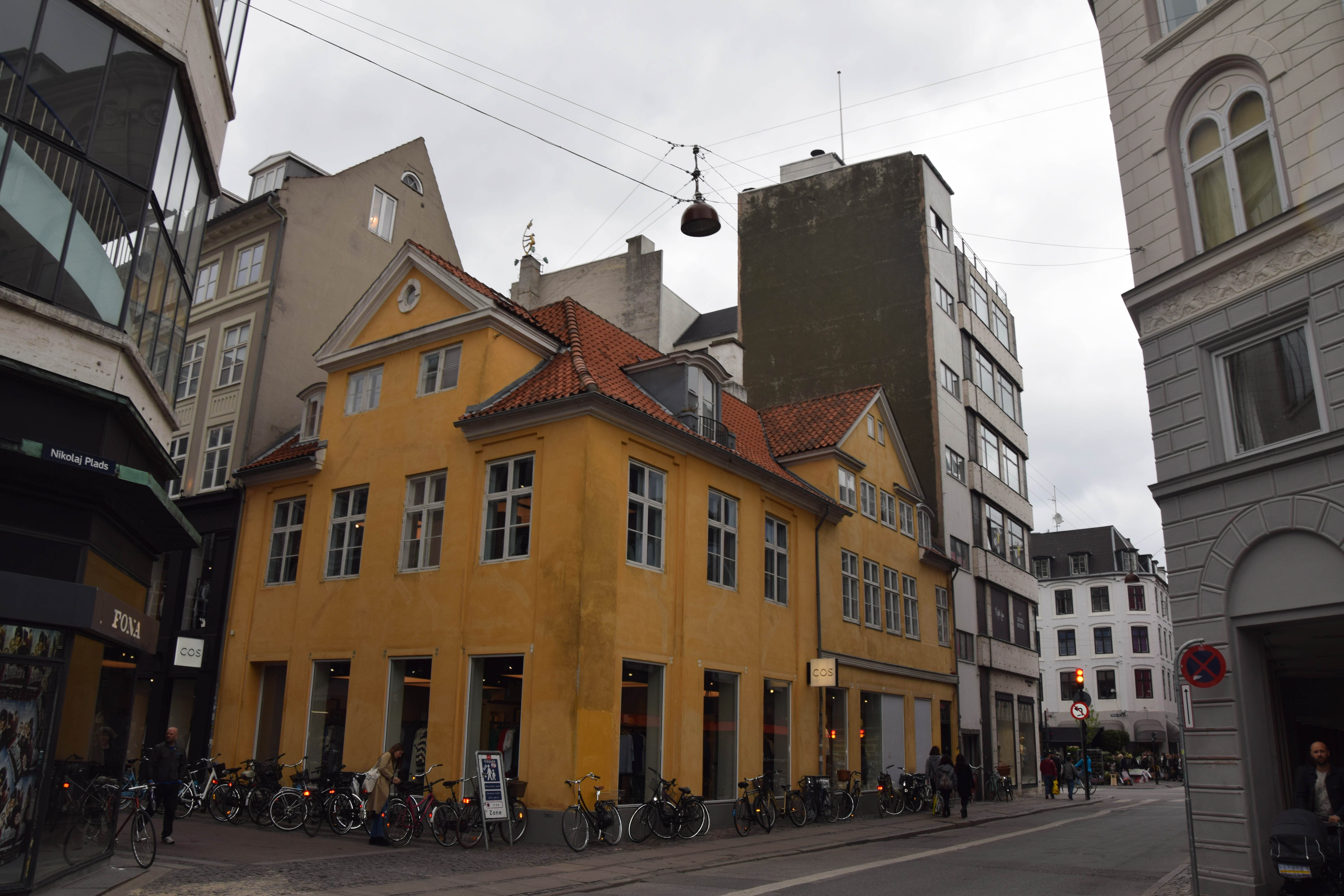
No. 3

No. 9, No. 11, No. 13 and No. 15 was all designed by P. C. Hagemann who also designed the market buildings and were all built in the 1840s,

The former Fonnesbech's department store (also Østergade 47) was built 1935–38 to a design by O. Gundlach-Petersen. From 1974 the premises on Nikolaj Plads housed the Copenhagen Stock Exchange.

== Public art ==
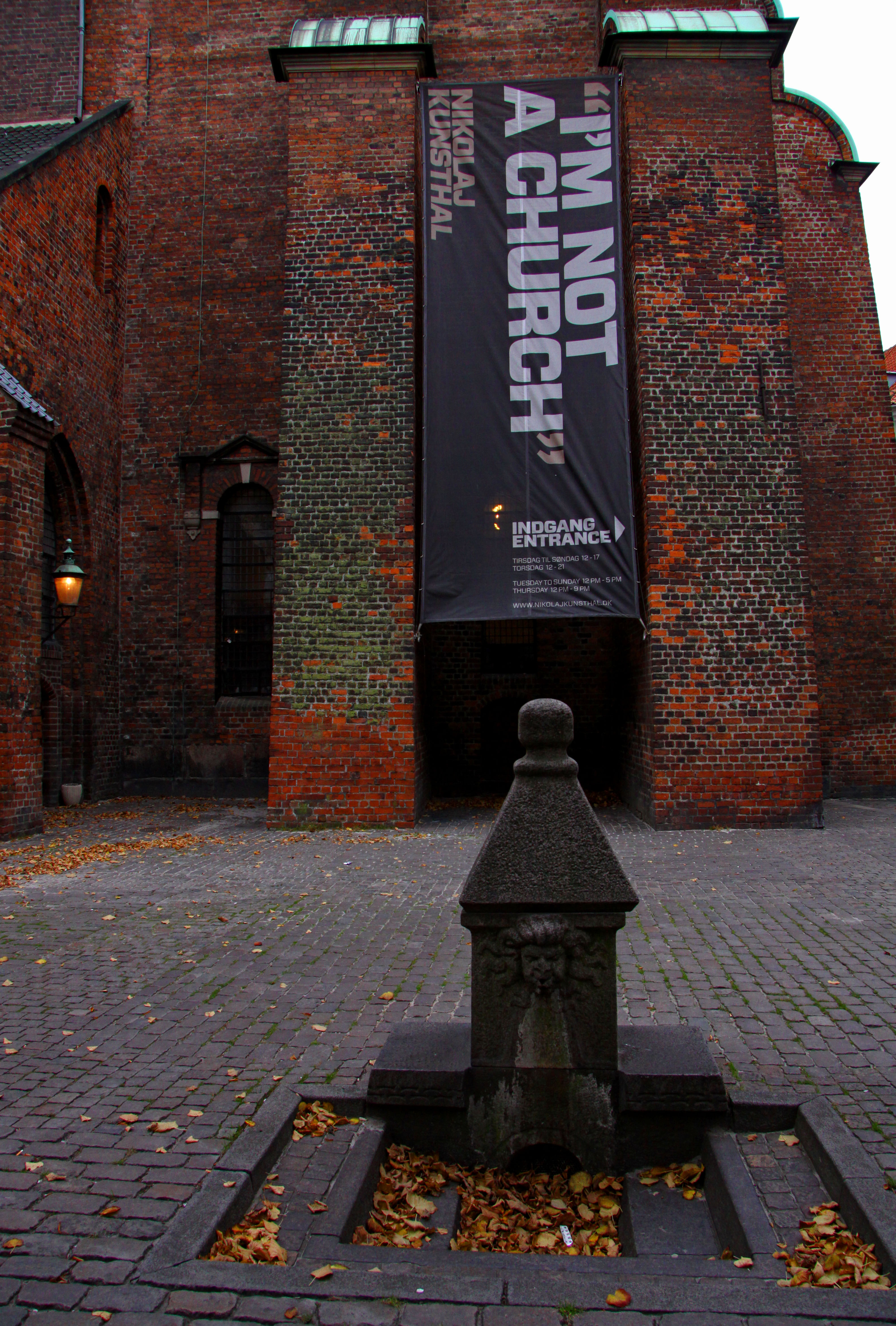
The granite fountain from 1899

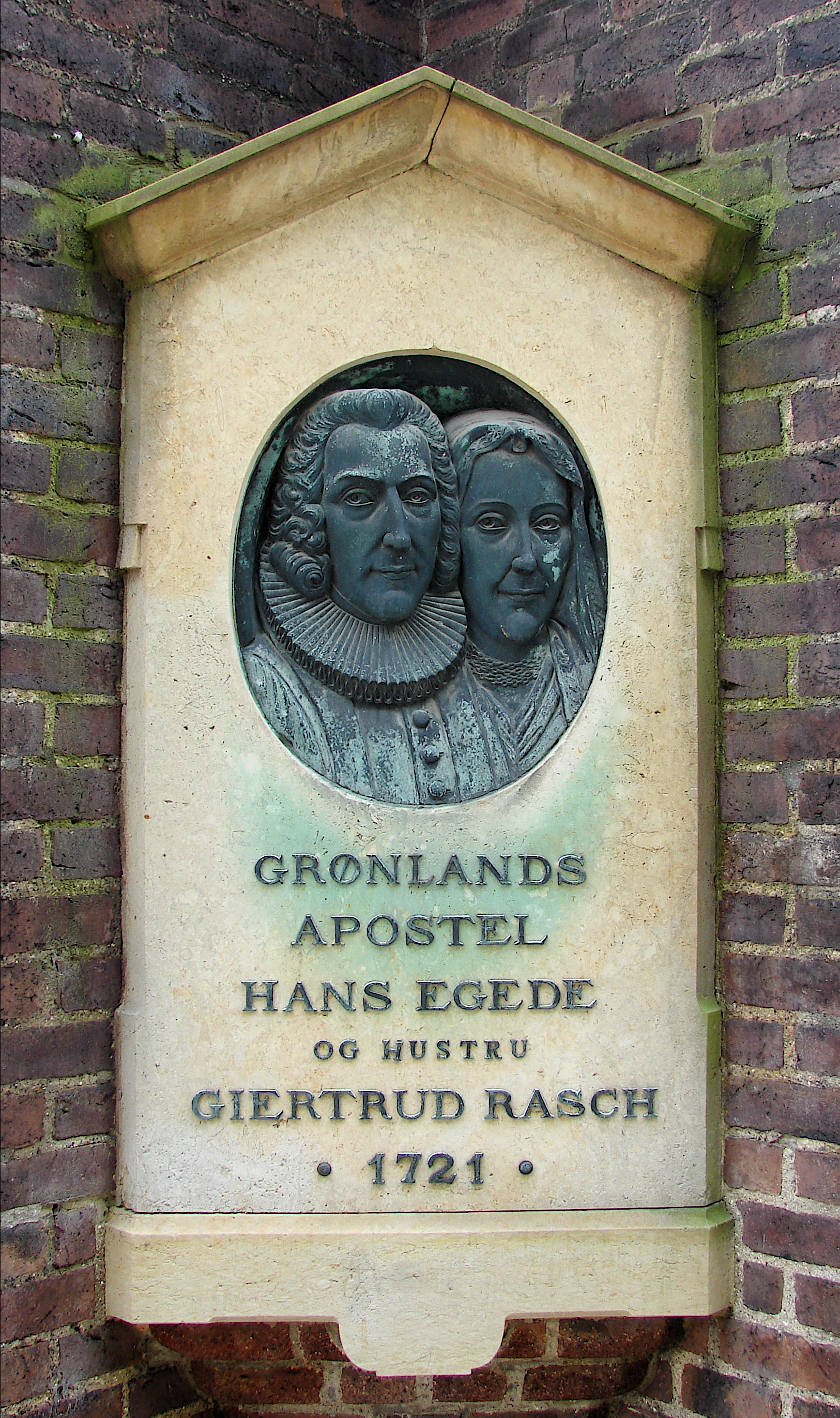
The Hans Egede and Giertrud Rask memorial

Three Shapes, three non-figurative bronze sculptures created by Bent Sørensen in the early 1980s were installed on the south side of the church in 1892 as a gift from the Albertina Foundation and the Ny Carlsberg Foundation. On the north side of the church is a decorative water fountain made of granite. It was installed on the square in 1899 to a design by Anders Bundgaard and Martin Nyrop.

Two memorials are situated on the wall of St. Nicolas' Church. On the northeast side there is a memorial to Hans Egede and Giertrud Rask. It is from 1921 and was designed by August Hassel. In the south-eastern corner of the church wall, near the chancel, there is a bust of Svend Aage Tauscher created by Troels Lybecker in 1987.

== See also ==
- List of squares in Copenhagen
- Vingårdstræde
