= Toftegårds Plads =

Square in Copenhagen, Denmark

Coordinates: 55.6621°N 12.5172°E

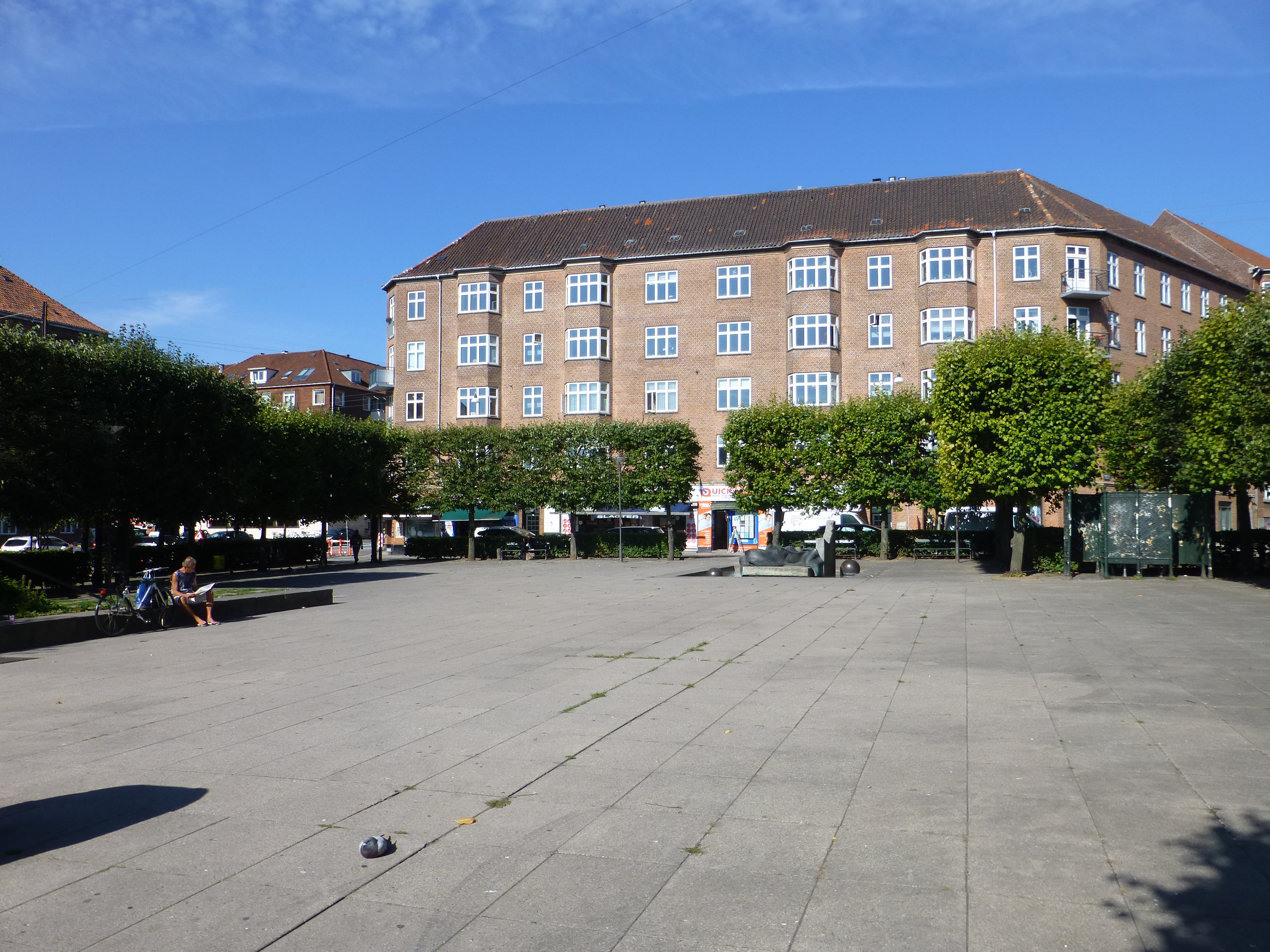
Toftegårds Plads: The section located on the north side of Vigerslev Allé

Toftegårds Plads is the largest square in the Valby district of Copenhagen, Denmark. It is bisected by Vigerslev Allé and situated on the corner with Gammel Køge Landevej.

== History ==
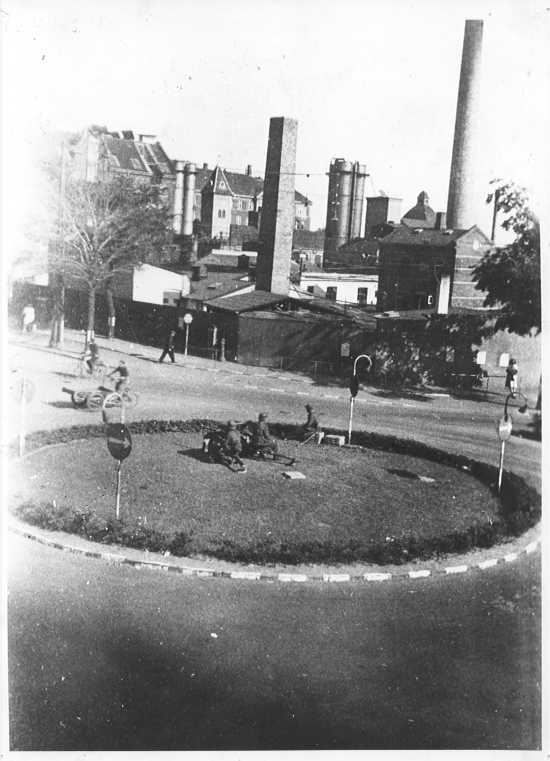
The roundabout with the demolished factory buildings in the background in 1944

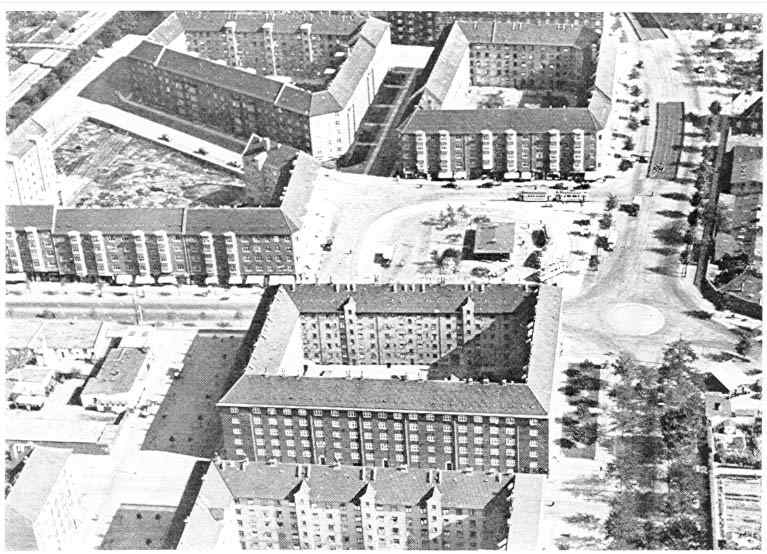
Aerial of Toftegårds Plads viewed from the west in c. 19351943

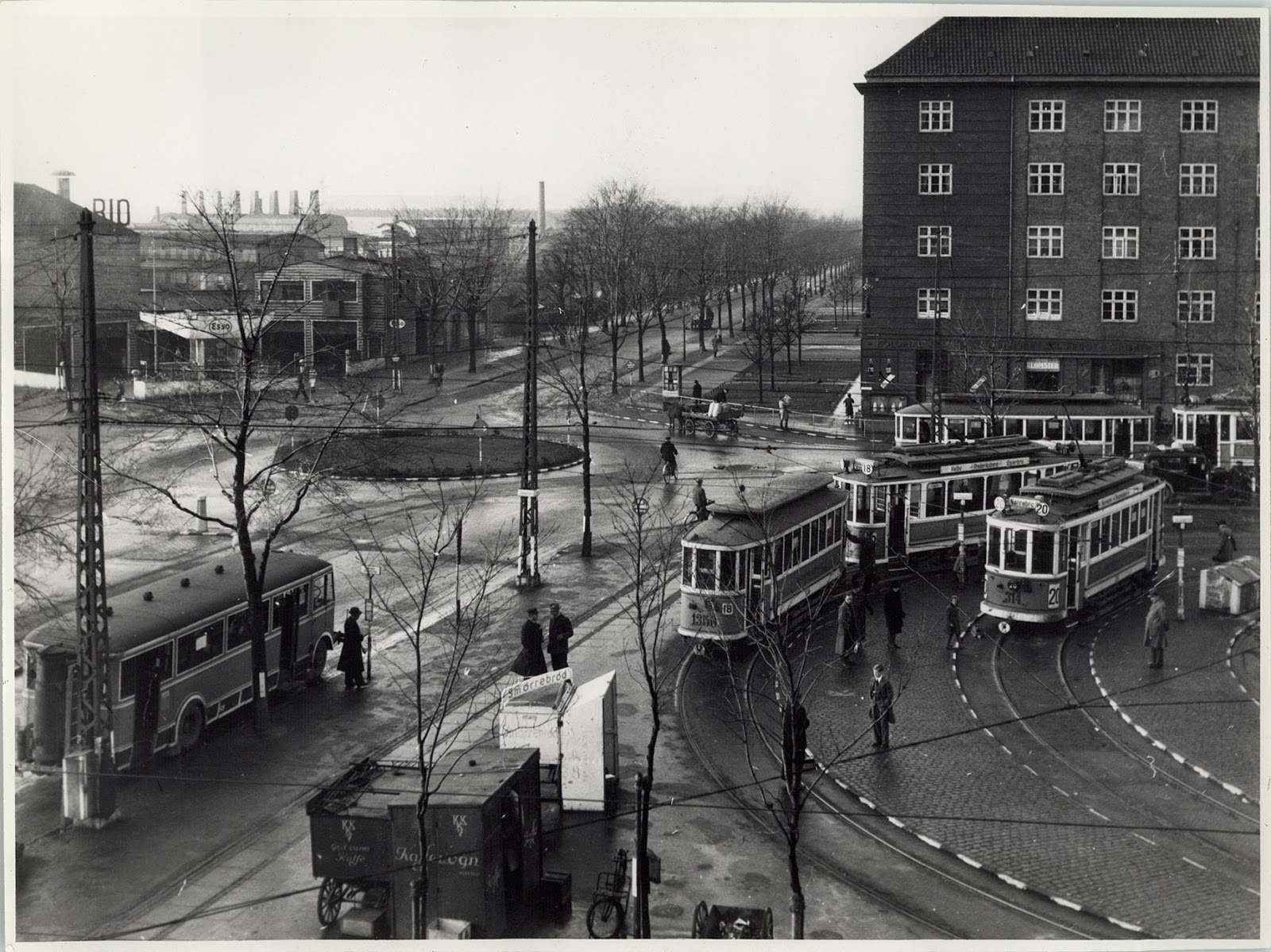
Toftegårds Plads with its turning loop and roundabout in 1943

The square was originally established in 1928 when a turning loop for trams was created on the corner of Vigerslev Allé with Toftegårds Allé. A roundabout was also established at the junction Vigerslev Allé, Gammel Køge Landevej and Toftegårds Allé.

The area to the south of Vigerslev Allé was originally the site of Kuhles Kulsyre- og Lakfabrik, a manufacturer of carbonic acid and lacquer. The factory was later taken over by A. Stallings and used for production of paint and lacquer under the name Lak- og Farvefabrik og før den Kuhles Kulsyre- og Lakfabrik syd for Vigerslev Alle. Toftegårds Plads grew to its current size when most of Stalling's buildings were demolished in 1979. The square was used as a hub for trams until 1973 and for buses until 1989. In 2010, Copenhagen Municipality launched an architectural competition for the redesign of the square.

== The square ==
The progonal, northern portion of the square was designed when the buses moved to the other side of Vigerslev Allé in 1982. The design includes a water feature and a number of artworks by Jens-Flemming Sørensen.

== Notable buildings and residents ==
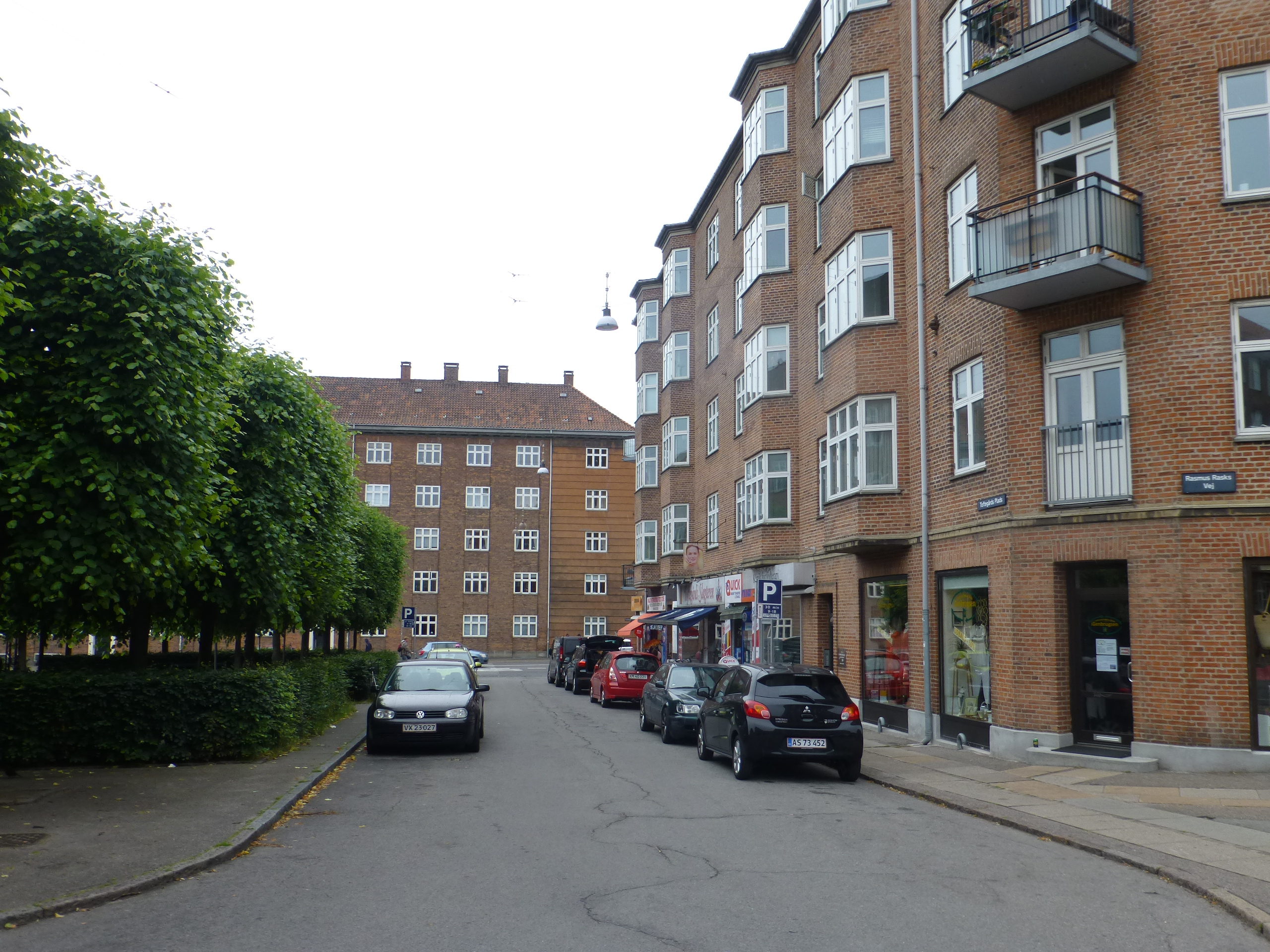
Apartment buildings

The northern, original part of the square is lined with apartment blocks in red brick. They are from 1921 to 1924 and were designed by Rolf Schroeader with Frederik Wagner as executing architect.

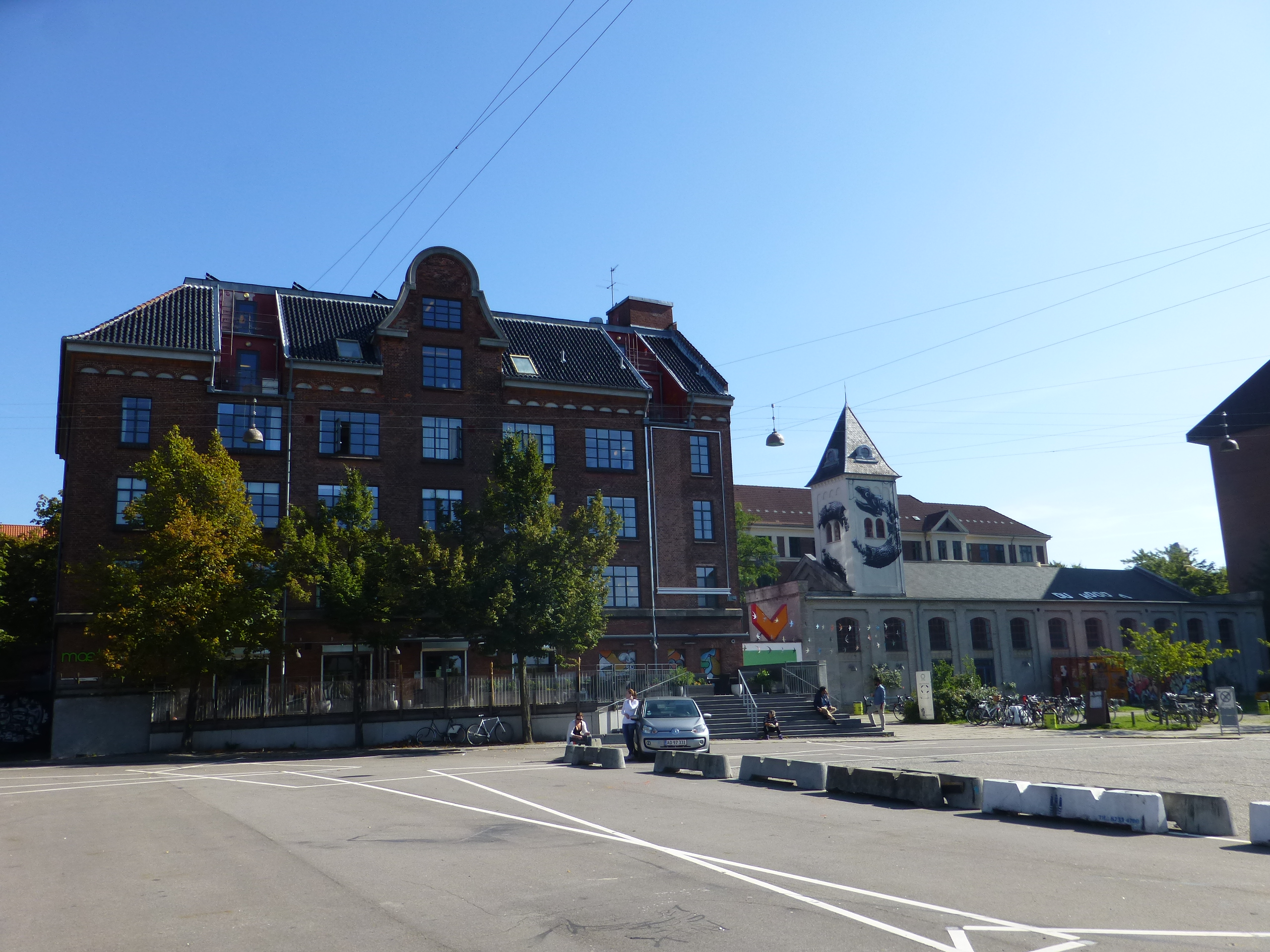
Valby Cultural Centre based in Stelling former production building and Nordic Carbonic Acis Factory's building

Stellings's former administration building and a former factory building are located on the east side of the southern portion of the square (Valgaardsvej). The adjacent Nordisk Kulsyrefabrik (Nordic Carbonic Acid Factory) with its condensator tower is from 1896. The buildings now house Valby Cultural Centre (Valby Kulturhus).

The south side of the square is occupied by the headquarters of Movia, Greater Copenhagen's main bus operator. It was built for the company's predecessor HT (Hovedstadens Trafikselskab) in the 1980s.

== Transport ==
Valby station is situated approximately 150 metres to the north of the square.

== See also ==
- List of squares in Copenhagen
