= Dan Turèlls Plads =

Square in Copenhagen, Denmark

Coordinates: 55.7518°N 12.5191°E

Dan Turèlls Plads is a public square in the Vangede district of Gentofte Municipality in the northern suburbs of Copenhagen, Denmark. It was named for the writer Dan Turèll on 19 March 2007. Turèll grew up in the Vangede in the 1950s and published the memoir Vangedebilleder in 1975. The square feature a 47 metre long, turquoise bench and a sculpture from 2011.

The square is located of the east side of Vangedevej, just south of Brogårdsvej.

== Alphabet Turèll ==
An iron sculpture created by the artist Kenn André Stilling, a friend of Turèll, was installed on the square in 2011. It is a composition of all the letters in the Danish alphabet in different sizes with Dan Turèll's initials as the two largest. The sculpture is inspired by a poem in Turèll's last poetry collection Tjah-a cha-cha from 1993: "The alphabet is my best toy and I will play with it until it has become too dark for me to see it anymore" ("Alfabetet er mit bedste legetøj. Jeg vil lege med det lige til det bliver for mørkt til at jeg kan sé det").

== See also ==
- List of squares in Copenhagen
