= Rosenørns Allé =

Street in Copenhagen, Denmark

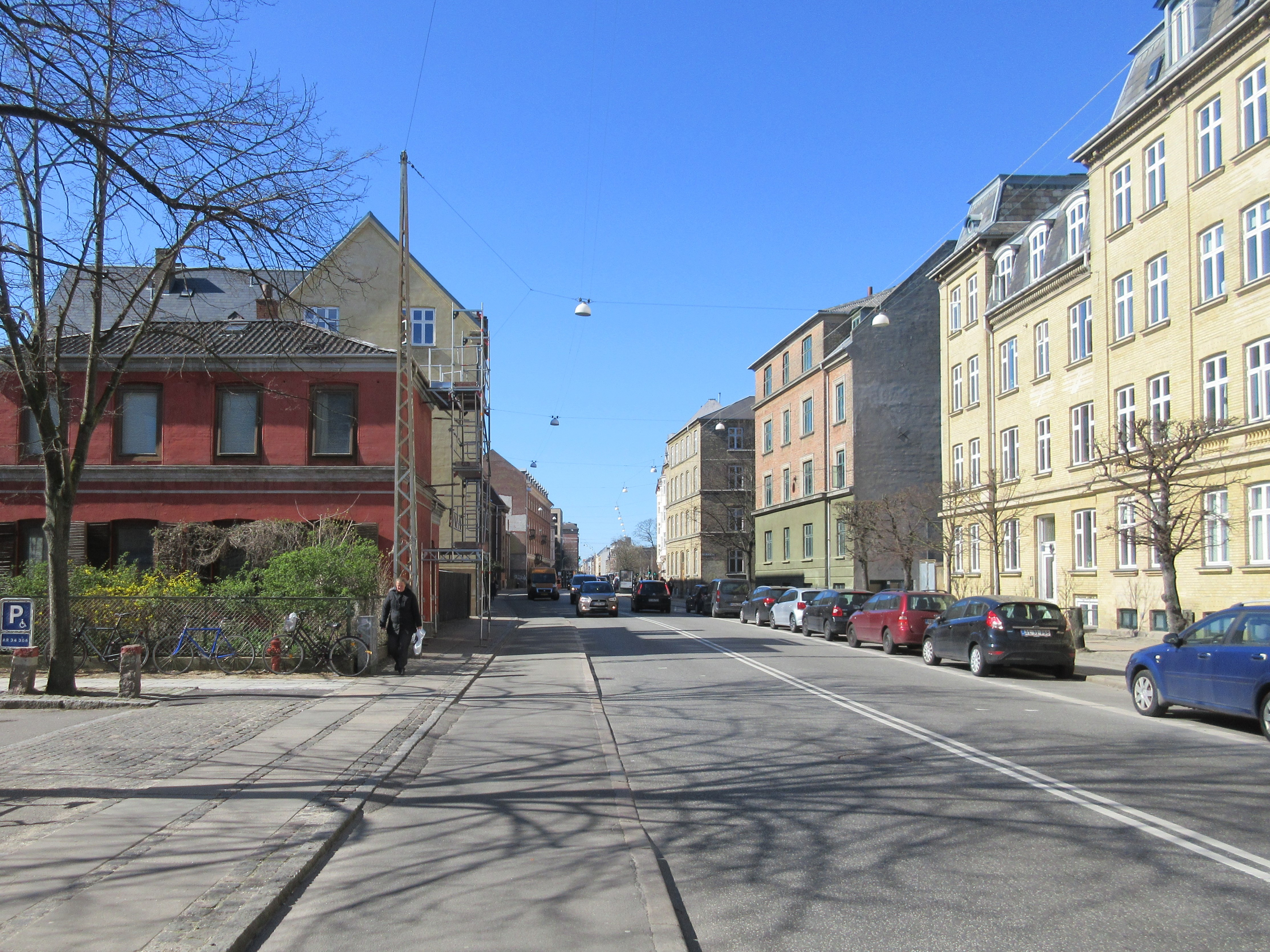
- Rosenørns Allé 02.jpg, looking west from Forum Metro Station
- Length: 791 m (2,595 ft)
- Location: Frederiksberg, Copenhagen, Denmark
- Postal code: 1634
- Nearest metro station: Forum
- Coordinates: 55°40′55.85″N 12°33′6.05″E

Rosenørns Allé is a street located on the border between Frederiksberg and Nørrebro, on the west side of The Lakes, in Copenhagen, Denmark. The street branches from the south side of the busy thoroughfare Kampmannsgade-Åboulevard at the west end of the embankment which separates St. Jørgen's Lake from Peblinge Lake, runs west to Julius Thomsens Plads and then continues in a more northwesterly direction to Bülowsvej where it turns into Rolighedsvej and later Godthåbsvej before reaching Bellahøj in Brønshøj.

Rosenørns Allé is associated with the Radio House and its name was commonly used as a metronym for DR's radio broadcasting operations prior to the inauguration of DR Byen in 2009. Julius Thomsens Plads, across the street from the Radio House, is a public space surrounded by the multi-purpose- venue Forum Copenhagen, several large, educational institutions and St. Mark's Church. It is also the site of the Forum metro station.

== History ==
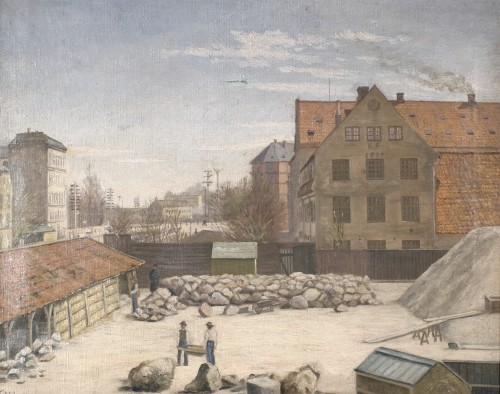
Ladegården in 1892

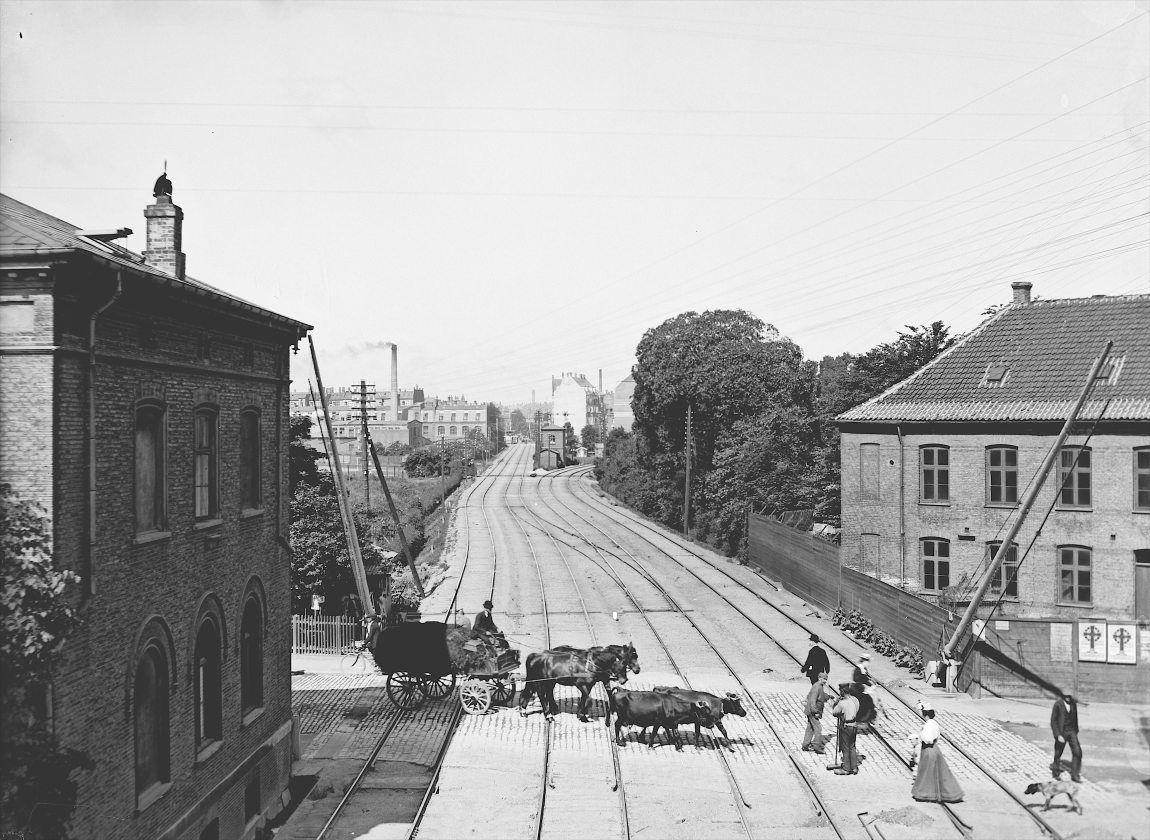
The railway seen from the bridge at Vordroffsvej

Rosenørns Allé is built on land that used to belong to Ladegården, originally a farm under Copenhagen Castle built by Christian IV in the 1620s.

When Copenhagen's second central station was located at Axeltorv, the westbound trains crossed The Lakes on the embankment where Gyldenløvevej runs today and followed what is now Rosenørns Allé to present-day Julius Thomsens Plads where it split into a northbound and a westbound line.

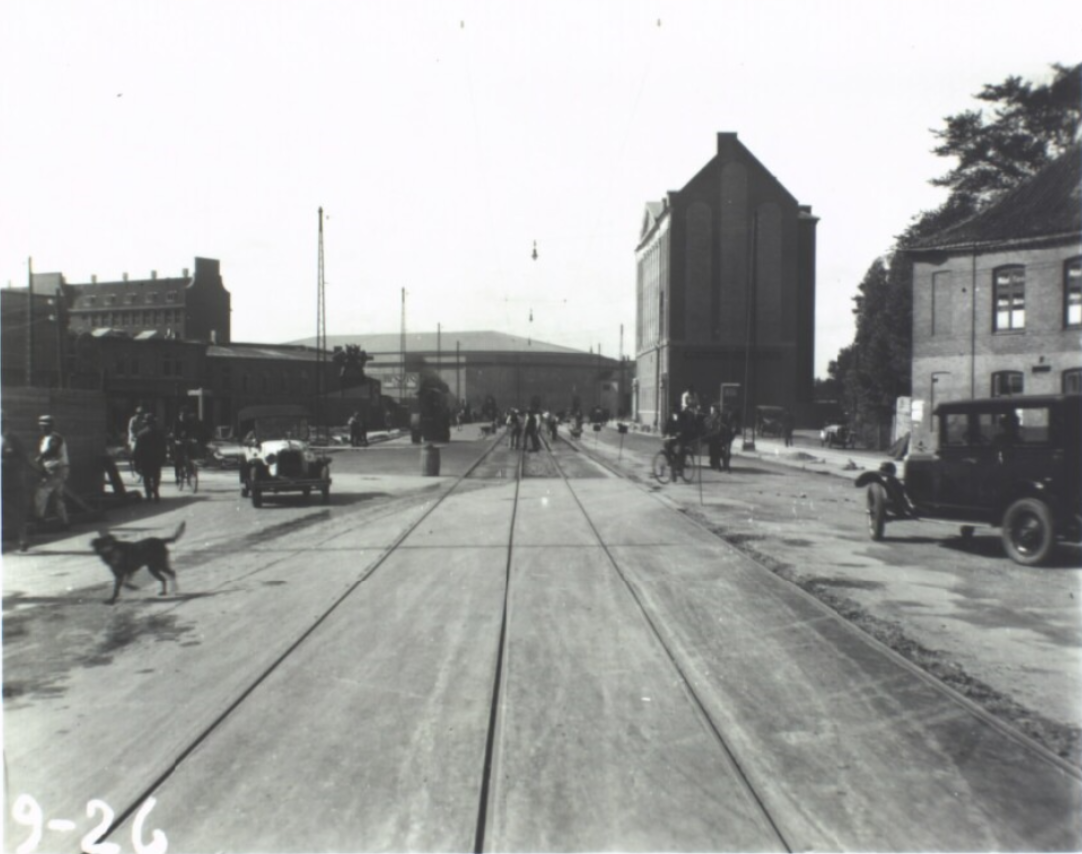
Rosenørns Allé

The western part of the avenue was established in about 1905 at the private initiative of Aktieselskabet Futurum and continued approximately 125 meter east from H. C. Ørsteds Vej. It was originally called Vinkelvek (Angle Road). The avenue was extended to Gyldenløvesgade by Copenhagen Municipality in 1927-28 and its name was changed to Rosenørns Allé after Ernst Emil Rosenørn (1810–1894). The triangular area between Åboulevard, Rosenørns Allé and the new street Julius Thomsens Gade had been transferred from Frederiksberg to Copenhagen municipality when Ladegården's old main building was demolished in 1924.

== Notable buildings and residents ==
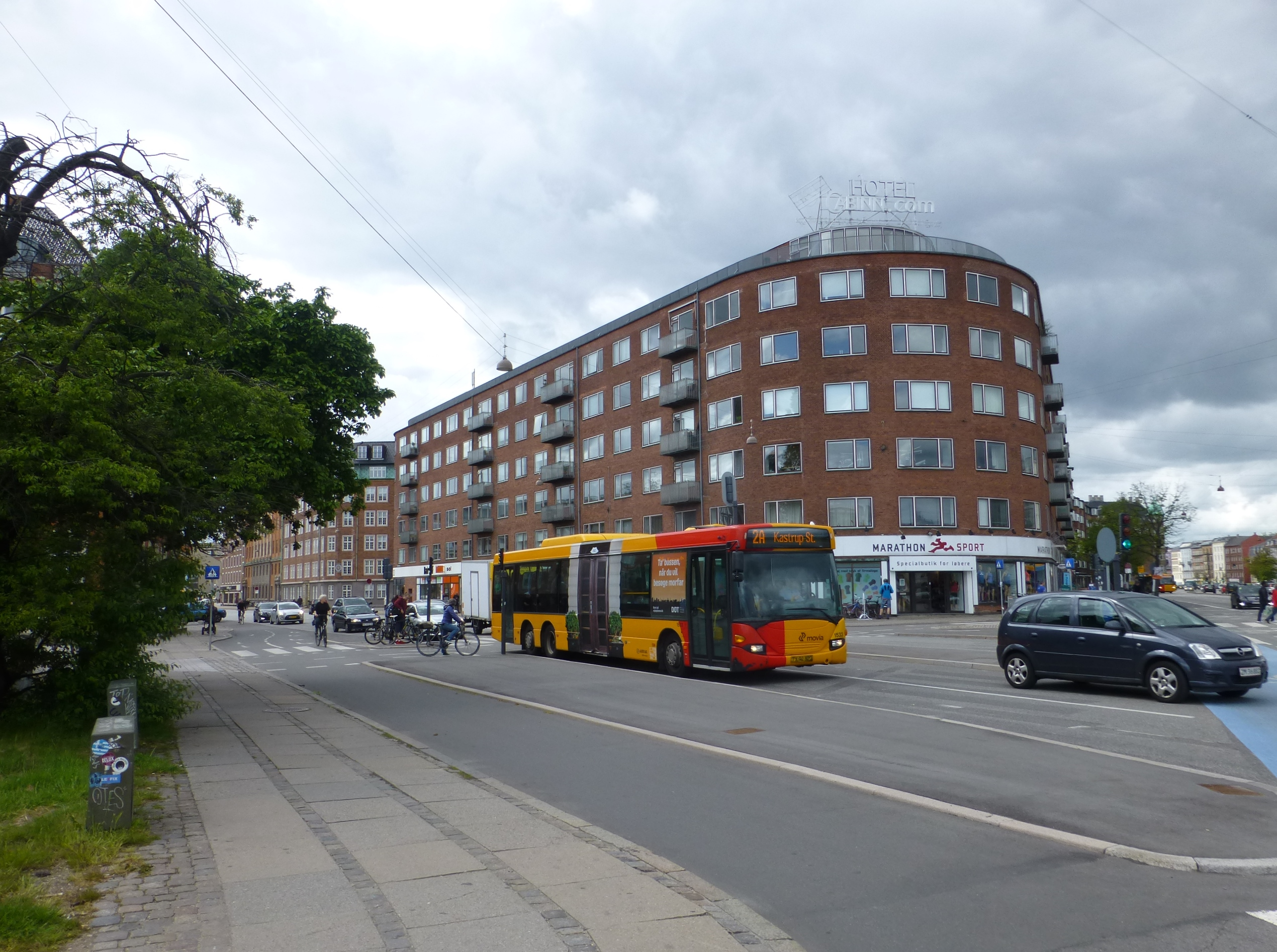
The Trianglein 1892

The Functionalist apartment building Trekanten ("The Triangle")on the rounded corner of Rosenørns Allé with Åboulevard was designed by Kay Fisker. In collaboration with C. F. Møller,

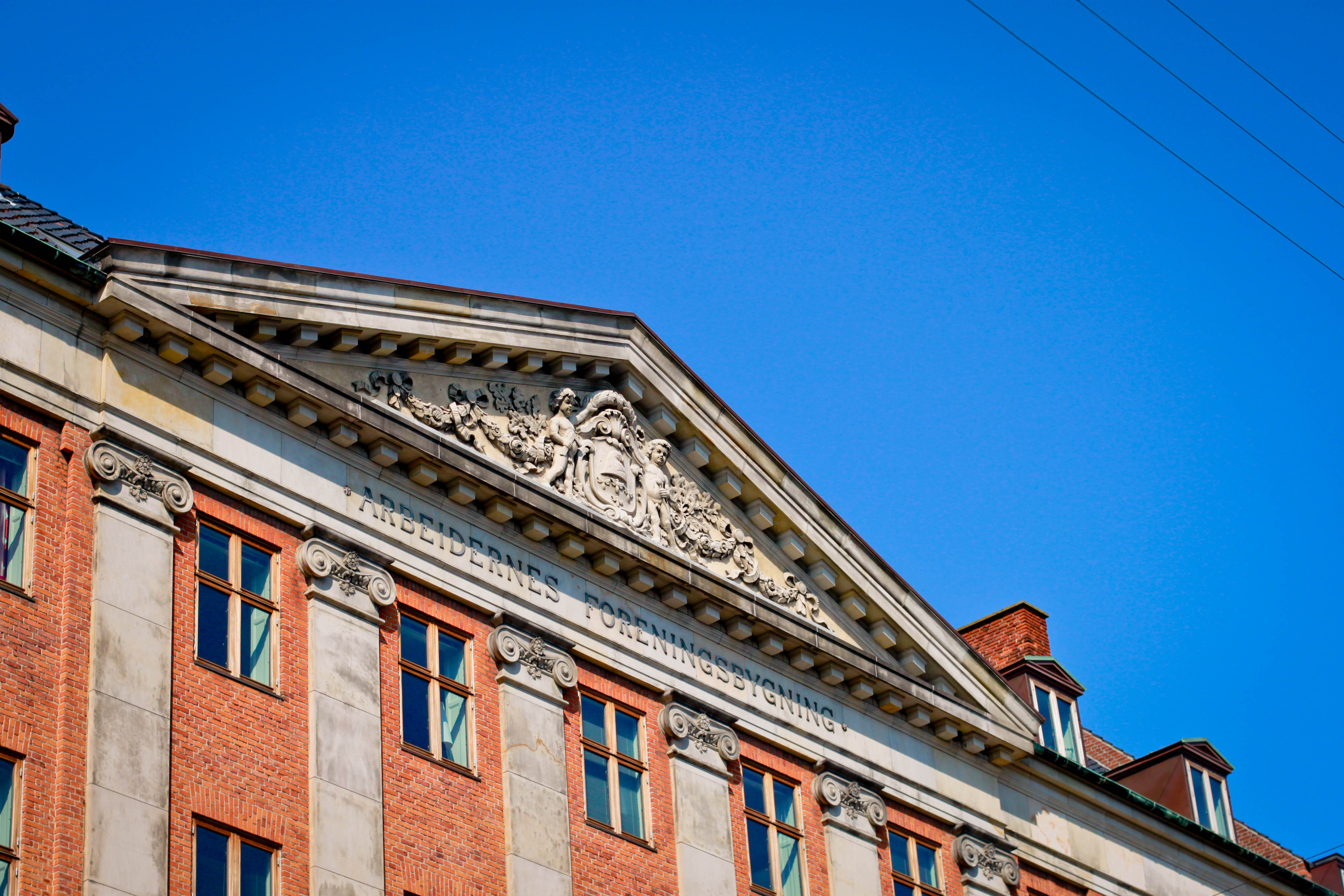
No. 12-15: LO's former headquarters

The insurance company Andels-Anstalten Tryg's former headquarters (No.1) is from 1927 and was designed by Arthur Wittmaack. Arbejdernes Foreningsbygning (12–14) is from 1924. It is the former headquarters of LO and now houses the Danish branch of Save the Children. Kvindelig Arbejderforbund also had a building in the street. It was built in 1940 to design by Edvard Heiberg who had also designed their building on Godthåbsvej.

The building on the corner of Bülowsvej (No. 40) and Rosenørns Allé (No. 70) is from 1906 and was designed by Axel Preisler in collaboration with Povl Baumann.

== Julius Thomsens Plads ==
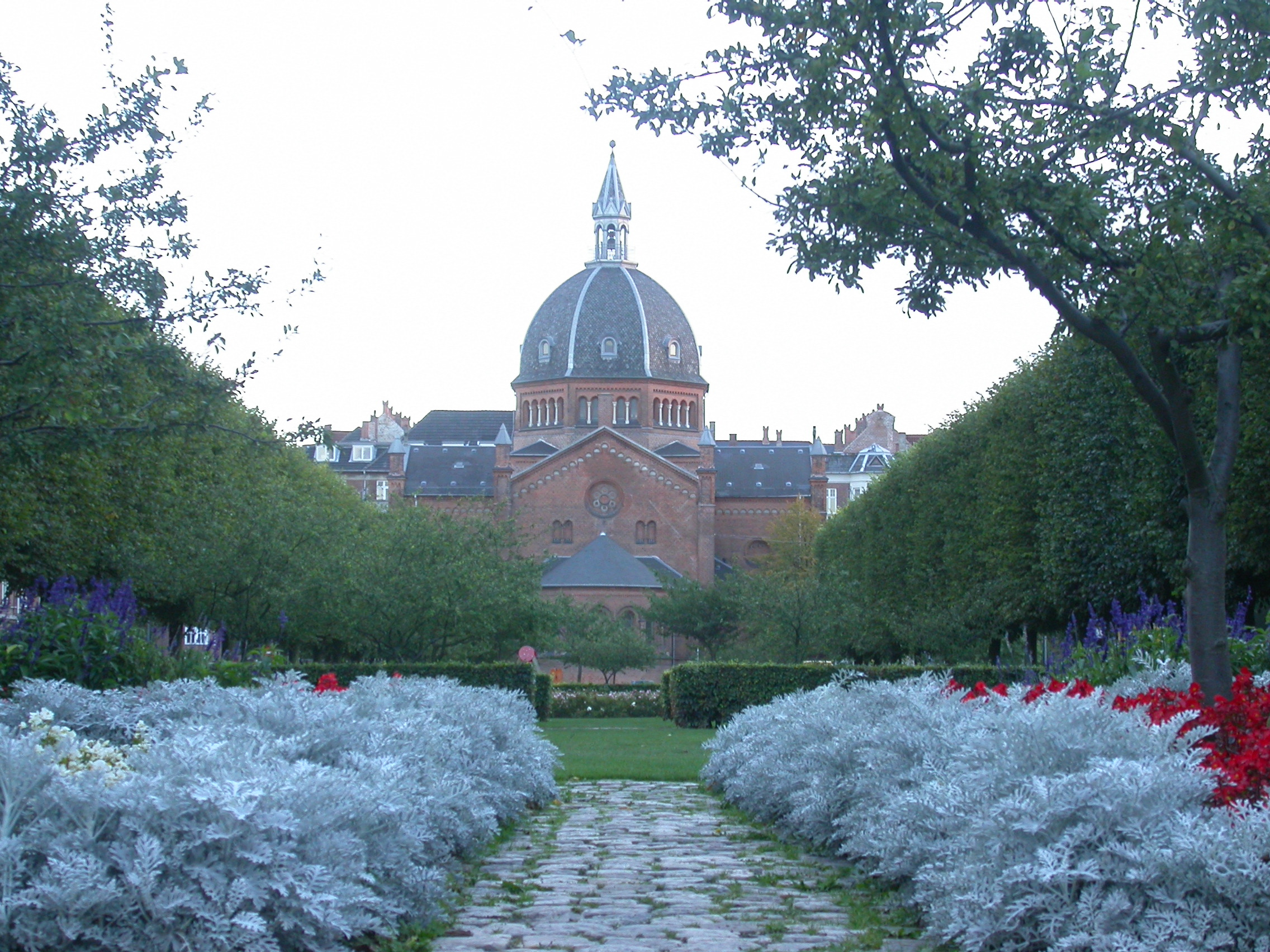
Julius Thomsens Plads with St. Mark's Church as a backdrop

Julius Thomsens Plads takes its name after the chemist Julius Thomsen. Forum Copenhagen occupies the west side of the square. On the east side is Købmandsskolen from 1927 (No. 6–10) which was built in 1927 to design by Jesper Tvede. It now houses Niels Brock Copenhagen Business College's upper secondary school Handelsgymnasiet JTP and the IT Department are based on the east side (No. 6 and 10). St. Mark's Church acts as a point de vue at the southern end of the square.

== Transport ==
The Forum Copenhagen Metro station is located at Julius Thomsens Plads.
