= St. Mark's Church, Copenhagen =

St. Mark's Church
- Sankt Markus Kirke
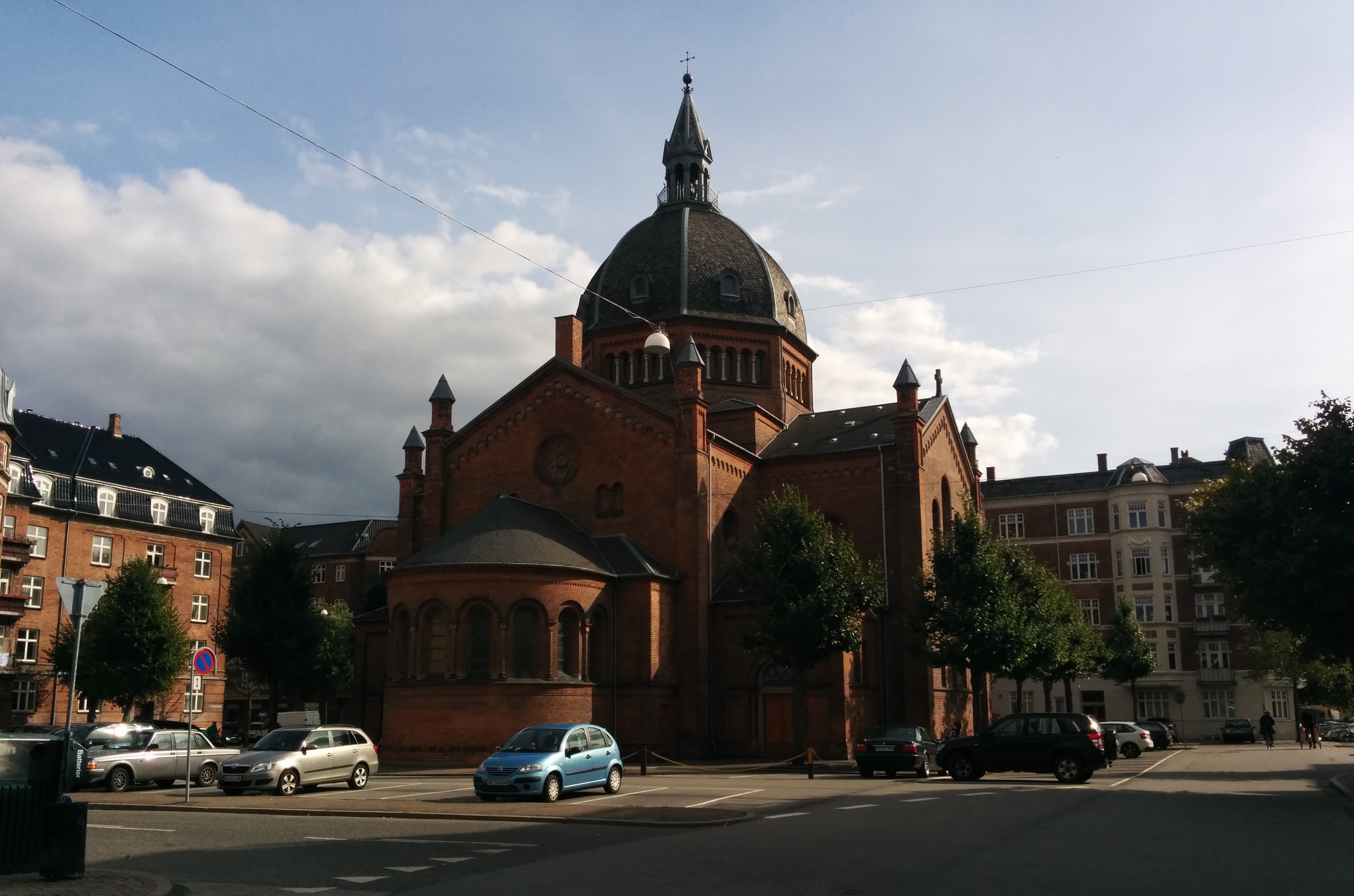
- St. Mark's Church seen from Julius Thomsens Plads
- St. Mark's Church
- 55°40′47.6″N 12°33′9.5″E
- Location: Frederiksberg, Copenhagen
- Country: Denmark
- Denomination: Church of Denmark

History
- Status: Church

Architecture
- Architect: Carl Lendorf
- Architectural type: Church
- Groundbreaking: 1900
- Completed: 1902

Specifications
- Materials: Brick

Administration
- Archdiocese: Diocese of Copenhagen

St. Mark's Church (Danish: Sankt Markus Kirke) is a church at the end of Julius Thomsens Plads in the Frederiksberg district of Copenhagen, Denmark.

== History ==
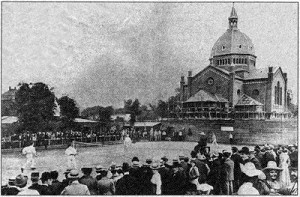
Photo from the opening in 1902

The church was built from 1900 to 1902 to the design of Carl Lendorf. It was consecrated on 9 November 1902 at a ceremony attended by Bishop Kultus Minister J. C. Christensen.

The area was still quite undeveloped on its completion but the surrounding buildings were built from 1903 to 1904 according to a symmetrical plan by Andreas Clemmensen.

== Architecture ==
The church is a cruciform church built in red brick with inspiration from Byzantine and Romanesque architecture.

Over the main portal there is a mosaic by Oscar Willerup depicting Saint Mark the Evangelist with a quill and a winged lion, his symbol.

== In popular culture ==
The church is used as a location in the 2003 comedy Se til venstre, der er en svensker.

== See also ==
- Brorson's Church
