= Stefansgade =

Street in Copenhagen, Denmark

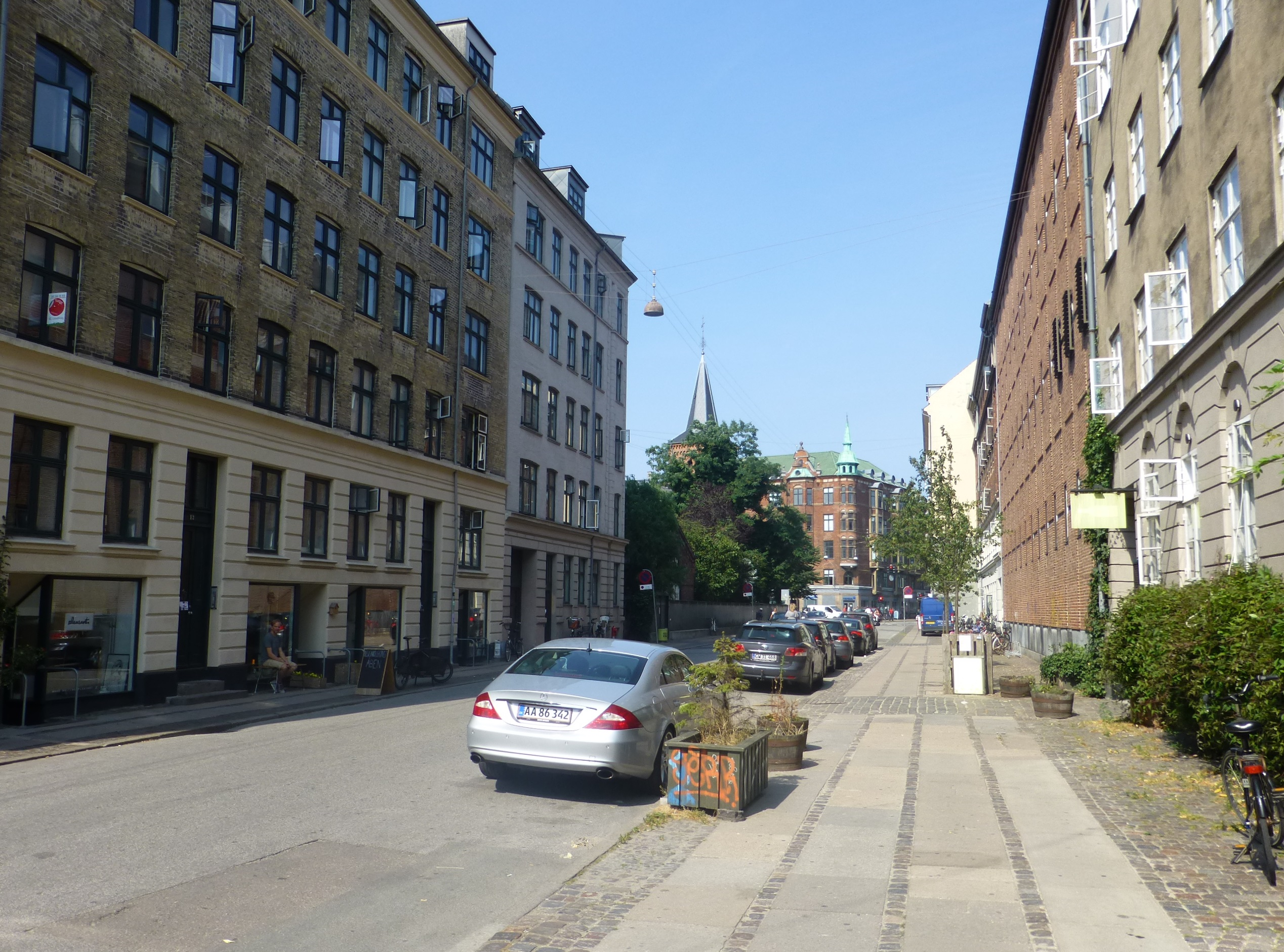
- Length: 750 m (2,460 ft)
- Location: Copenhagen, Denmark
- Quarter: Nørrebro
- Postal code: 2200
- Nearest metro station: Nørrebros Runddel
- Coordinates: 55°41′37.2″N 12°32′31.33″E
- Northeast end: Nørrebrogade
- Southwest end: Borups Allé

Stefansgade (lit. 'Stephen Street') is a street in the Nørrebro district of Copenhagen, Denmark. It runs from Nørrebrogade in the northeast to Borups Allé in the southwest. It takes its name from St. Stephen's Church at the corner of Nørrebrogade. The street passes along the southeast side of Nørrebro Park.

== History ==
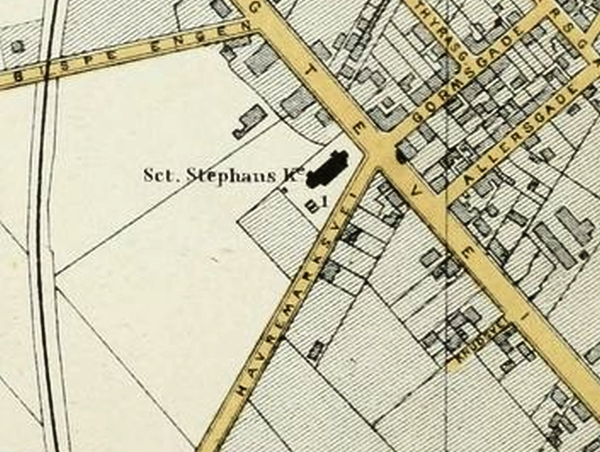
Havremarksvej seen on a map detail from between 1874 and 1880

Stefansgade was originally called Havremarksvej. The name Havremarken referred to the area between Nørrebrogade and Jagtvej and subsists in the name of Havremarkens Skole in Husumgade. St. Stephen's Church was inaugurated at the beginning of the street in 1874. The name Stefansgade was initially associated with present-day Bragesgade but was in 1880 transferred to the current street.

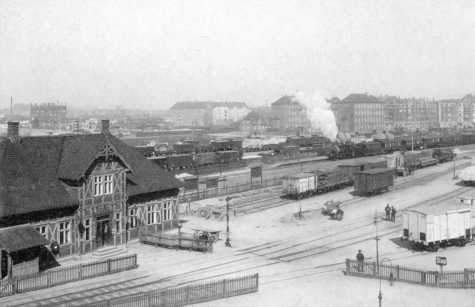
The first Nørrebro station (Station A) which opened at the street in 1886

Havremarksvej was from 1861 crossed by the north-bound Klampenborg Eailway at present day Jægsrsborggade. A branch to Helsingør by way of Lyngby and Killerød opened in 1864. The first station north of Copenhagen was Hellerup. In the mid-1880s, the need for a station had become still more obvious, both to serve the fast-growing population of the district and for transporting building materials and other goods. When the first Nørrebro station opened in 1886, it consisted of two separate station buildings. Station A, which served the north-bound trans, was located at Stefansgade. Station B, which served the south-bound trains, was located in Lyngbygade (now Hillerødgade).

A brewery named Stefan was in 1885 established in the street by H.C. Meyer. It was acquired by Københavns Bryggerier og Malterier in 1997. The brewery moved its headquarters from Dronning Olgas Vej in Frederiksberg to Stefansgade and was at the same time renamed Hafnia. It closed in 1939.

== Notable buildings and residents ==
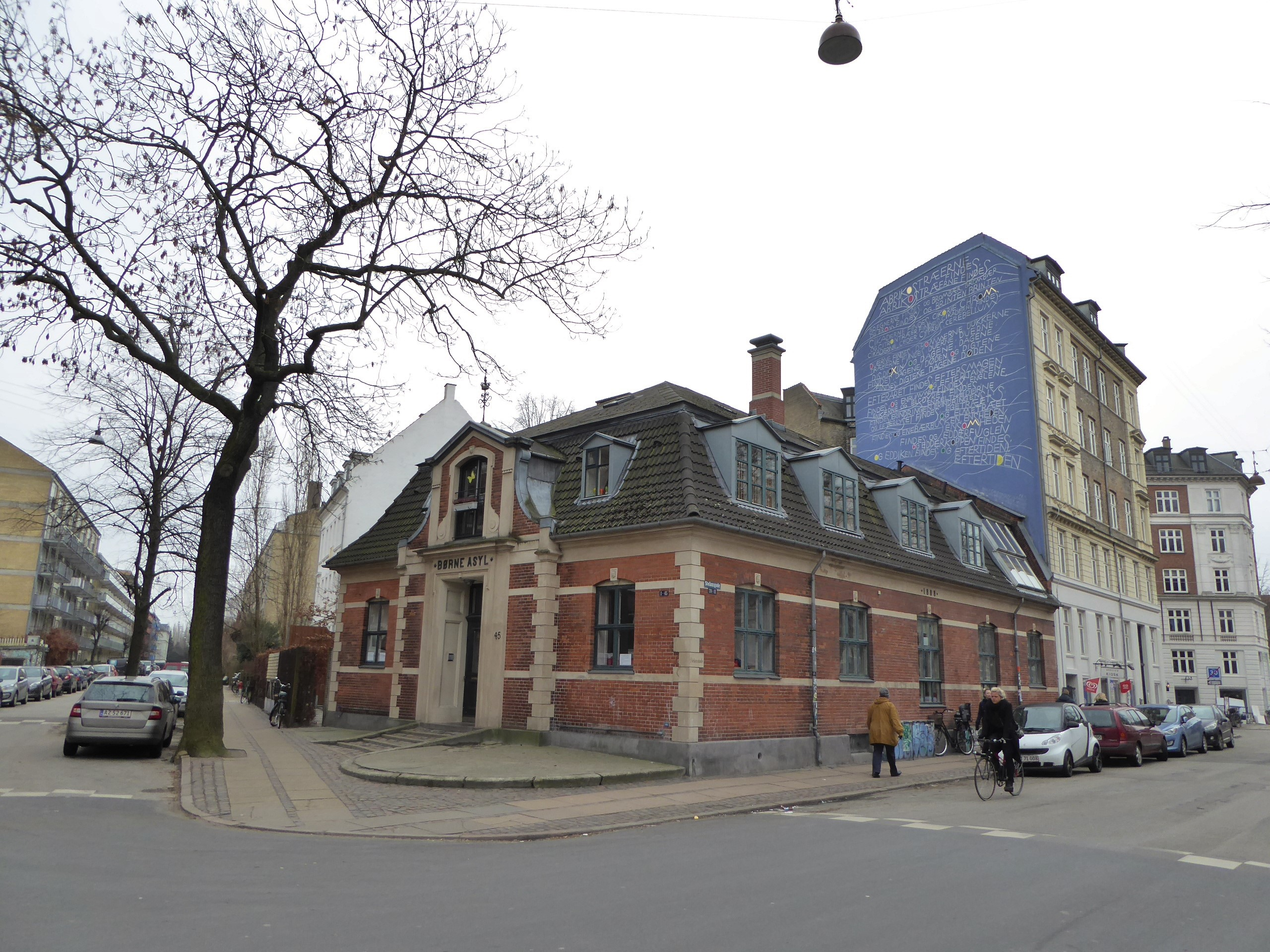
Dronning Louises Børneasyl

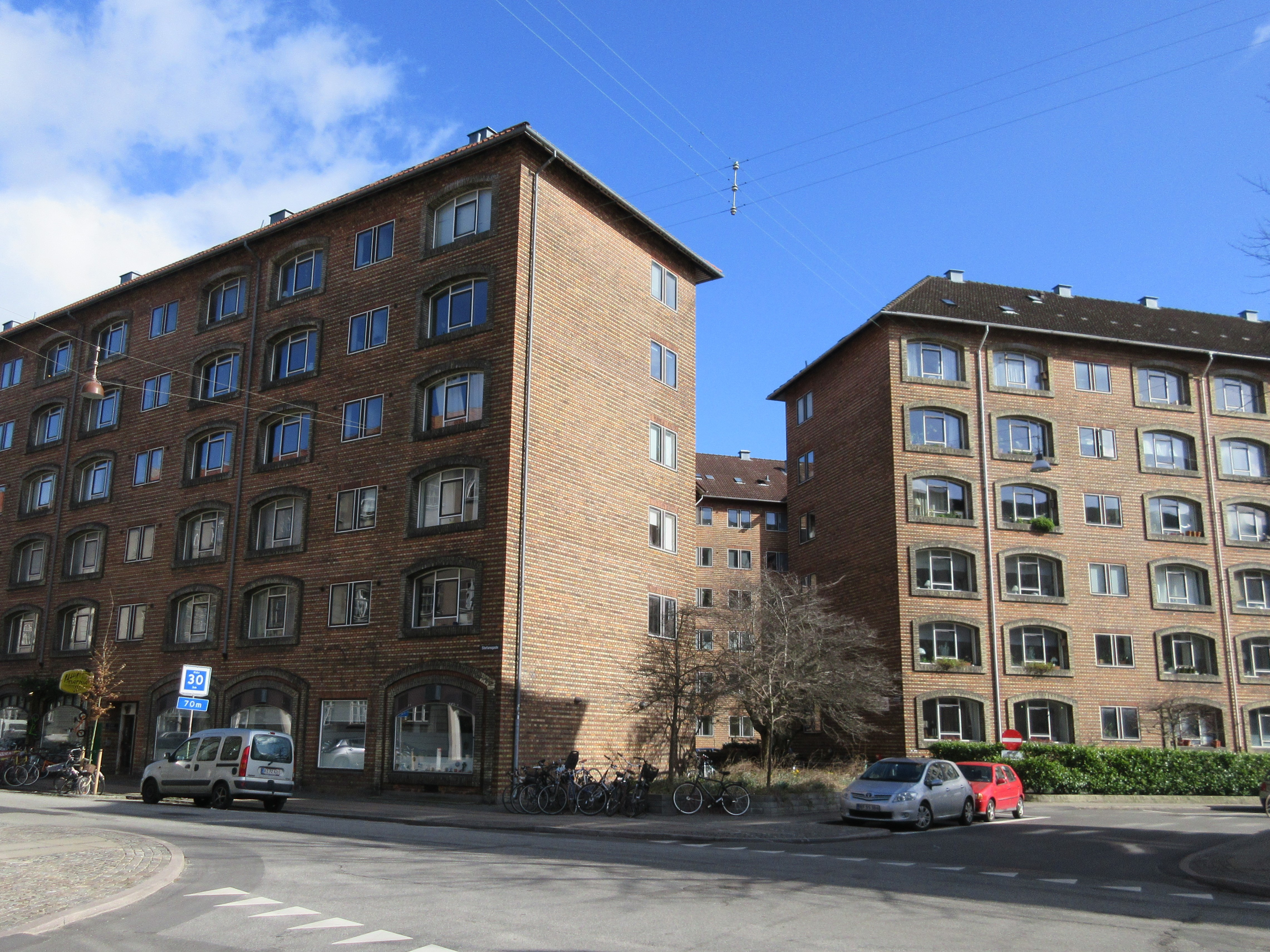
No. 51: Stefansgården

Dronning Louises Børneasyl (Bjelkes Allé 45/Stefansgade 39), a children's daycare facility, was built by Dronning Louises Asylselskab in 1888. The building was designed by Vilhelm Dahlerup, one of the leading Danish architects of his time, who has also designed much more prominent landmarks such as the Royal Danish Theatre and the Danish National Gallery.

The housing estate at Stefansgade 17/Julius Bloms Gade 24-32/Holtegade 16 is from 1923 and was designed by Christian Mandrup-Poulsen.

The housing estate at the corner of Stefansgade and Borups Allé is from 1919 to 1921 and was designed by Kay Fisker. Stefansgården, the housing estate that replaced the Fafnia Brewert's buildings in 1944, was also designed by Fisker.

== Transport ==
The Nørrebros Runddel Copenhagen Metro station is located approximately 400 metres to the south of the street by way of Nørrebrogade. Nørrebro station, served both by metro (M3) and S'trains, is located approximately 650 metres in the opposite direction.
