= Dronning Olgas Vej =

Street in Denmark

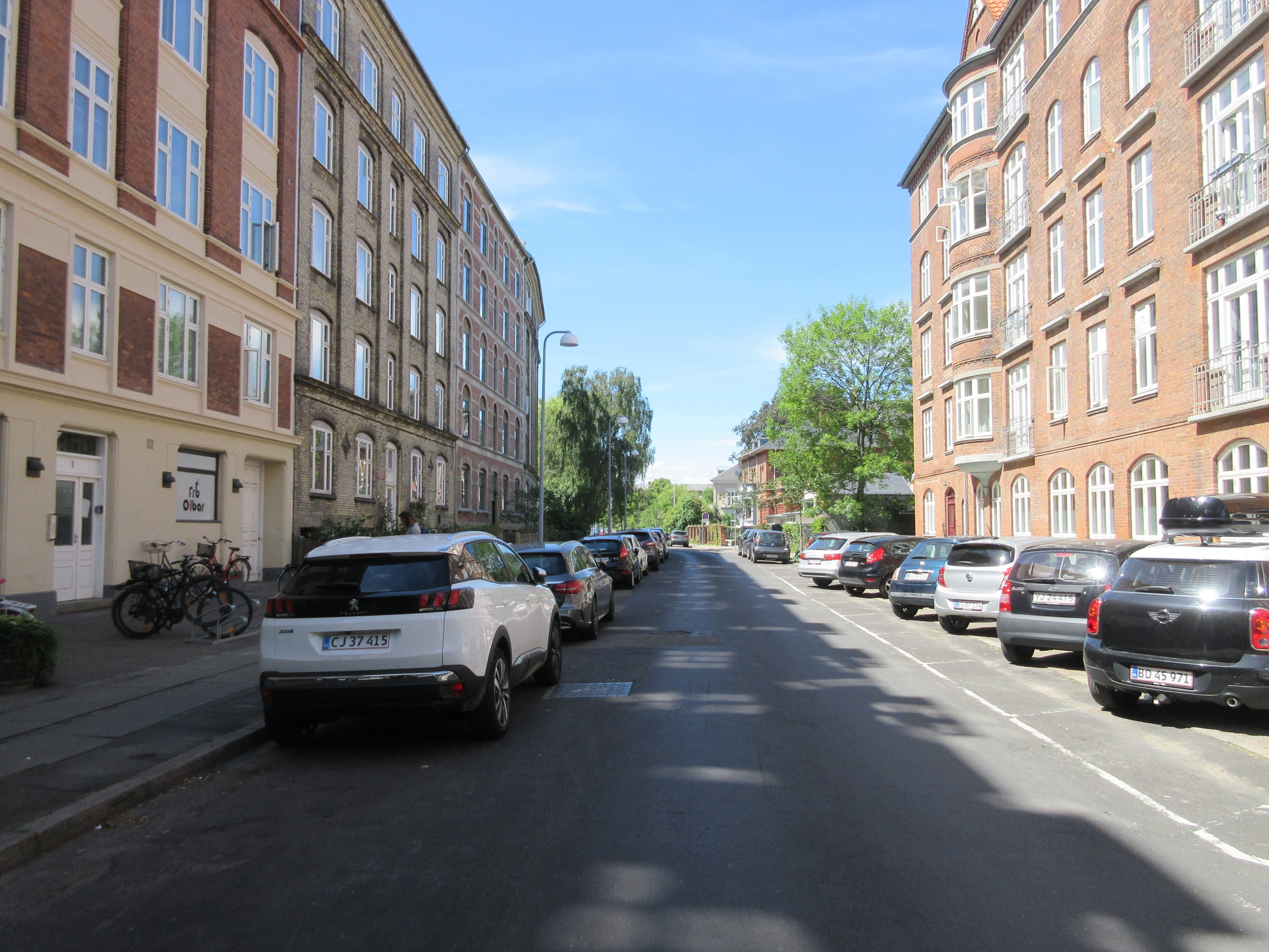
- Length: 735 m (2,411 ft)
- Location: Copenhagen, Denmark
- Quarter: Frederiksberg
- Nearest metro station: Aksel Møllers Have Metro
- East end: Falkoner Allé
- West end: Kong Georgs Vej

Dronning Olgas Vej (Danish: Queen Olga's Road) is a street in the Mariendal neighborhood of Frederiksberg in Copenhagen, Denmark. It runs from Falkoner Allé in the east to a modernist housing estate adjacent to Nordre Fasanvej in the west from where it turns south to join Kong Georgs Vej. The Modernist housing estate was built in the 1970s in the former grounds of the Stjernen cooperative brewery. Most of the other buildings in the street are single family detached homes from the late 19th and early 20th century.

== History ==
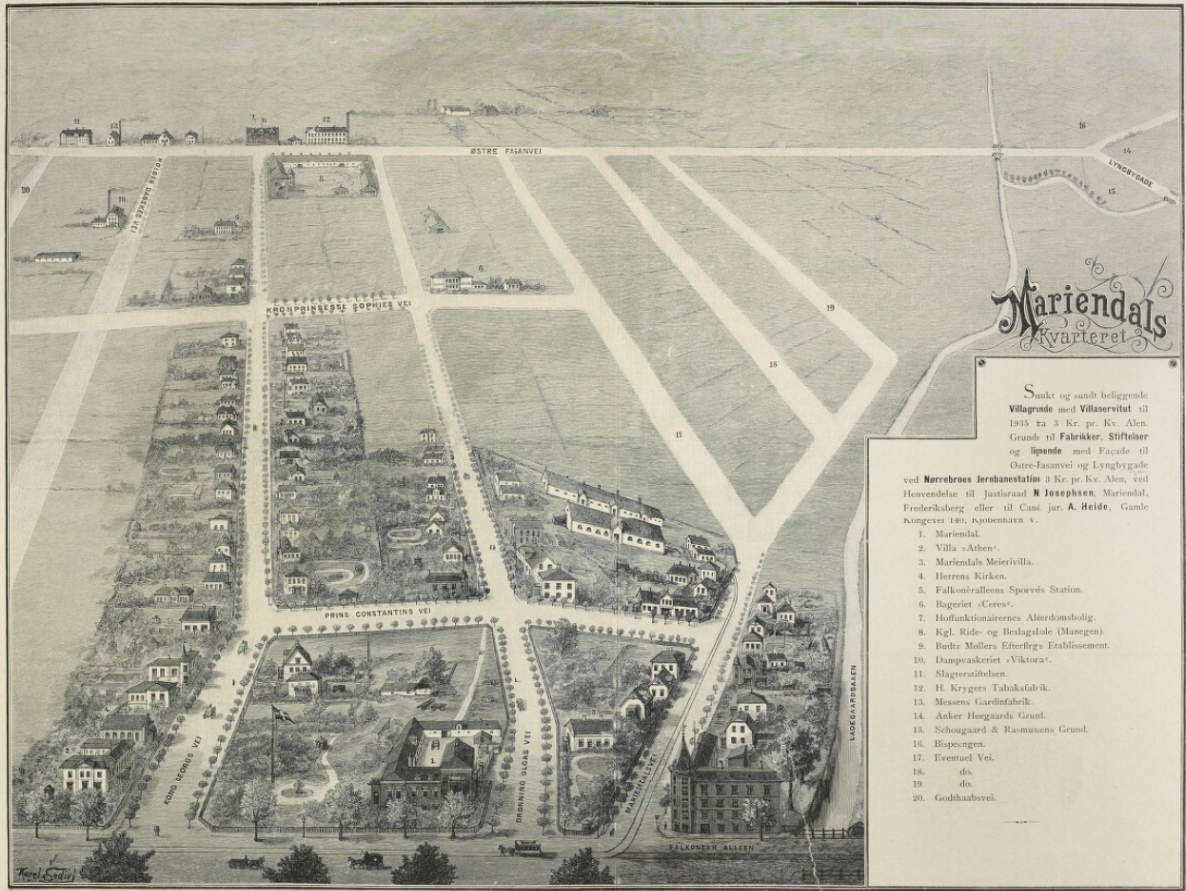
Drawing by Karel Šedivý with a bird's eye view of the new Mariendal Quarter, 1900

The street was created as part of Niels Josephsen's masterplan for redevelopment of the Mariendal estate. Josephsen, a sworn royalist and particularly great admirer of the Greek royal family, decided to name some of the streets in the neighborhood after some of its members. The Danish Prince Vilhelm, a son of Christian IX, had been crowned as George I of Greece in 1863. Dronning Olgas Vej was named after his queen consort, Olga Constantinovna of Russia, while the parallel street Kong Georgs Vej and the two intersecting streets Prins Constantins Vej and Kronprinsesse Sofies Vej were named after King Georg, Crown Prince Constantine and Crown Princess Sofia.

Most of the lots along the street were sold to members of the upper middle class but some of the lots at the far end of the street were sold for other uses. Den Kongelige Ride- og Beslagskole, a royal equestrian school, was built at No. 61. The Ceres Bread Factory was built at No. 34 in 1912 to designs by Ejnar Thuren.

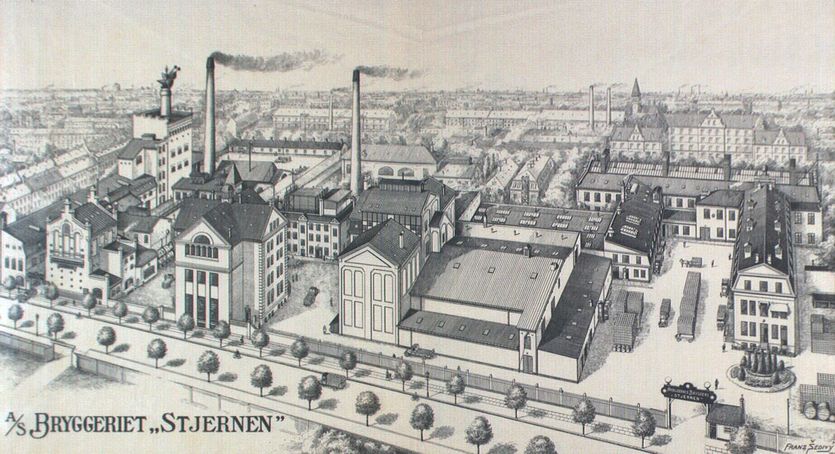
Stjernen under construction

The cooperative brewery was built by the labour union in 1802. The buildings were designed by Gotfred Tvede (1863–1947). The equestrian school was in the 1920s taken over by the brewery and used for a new soft drink factory. The bread factory was in circa 1940 also taken over by the brewery in connection with another extension. Stjernen closed in 1964.

== Buildings ==
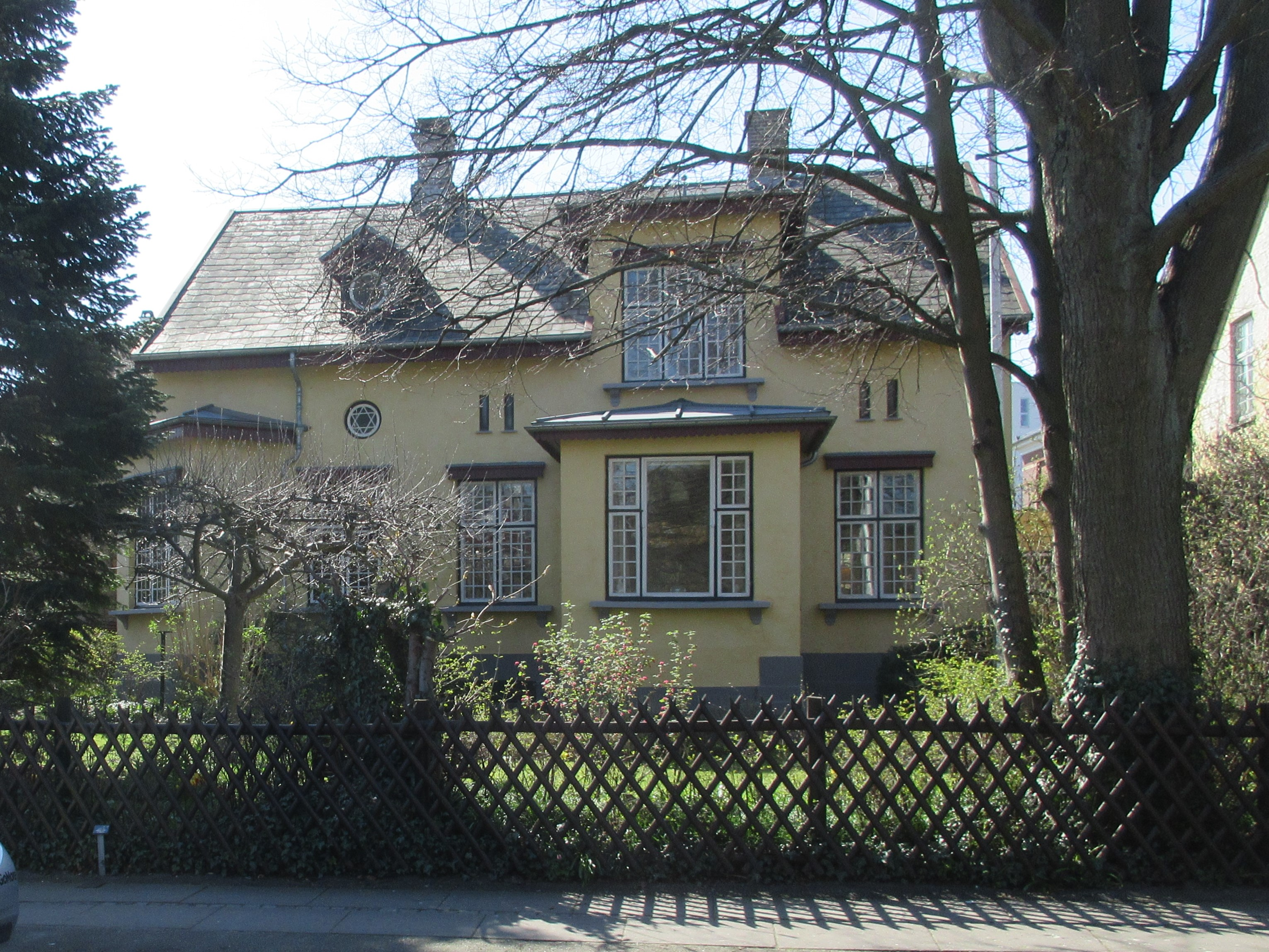
Dronning Olgas Vej 17

The two houses at No. 17 and No. 19 were both listed on the Danish registry of protected buildings and places in 1996. Both houses are from 1887 and were designed in 1887 by Niels Rasmussen and S. F. Schougaard.

The house at No. 25 is the former home of painter Luplau Janssen. He was an enthusiastic amateur astronomer and the house contained an astronomical observatory known as the Urania Observatory. The house was later taken over by his son Carl Emil Janssen who was also a painter but combined it with a professional career as an astronomer. The dome of the observatory has later been dismantled but the name Urania is still seen on the facade of the building.

Journalisternes Hus (No. 56) was built by the Association of Journalists in Copenhagen to provide affordable housing for retired journalists in needy circumstances. It contained 12 apartments of which three were free of rent. The Neoclassical building is from 1902 and was designed by Erik Schiødte in collaboration with C. Ditlefsen.

The Stjernen Housing Estate at the far end of the street was built in 1974 to designs by Svenn Eske Kristensen but has later undergone extensive alterations.

== Transport ==
The nearest metro stations are at Aksel Møllers Have (M3) and Frederiksberg. The latter station is both served by M1/M2 and M3 (City Circle Line). Bus line 74 has a stop at Dronning Olgas Vej.
