= Anna Wulff =

Danish kindergarten teacher (1874–1935)

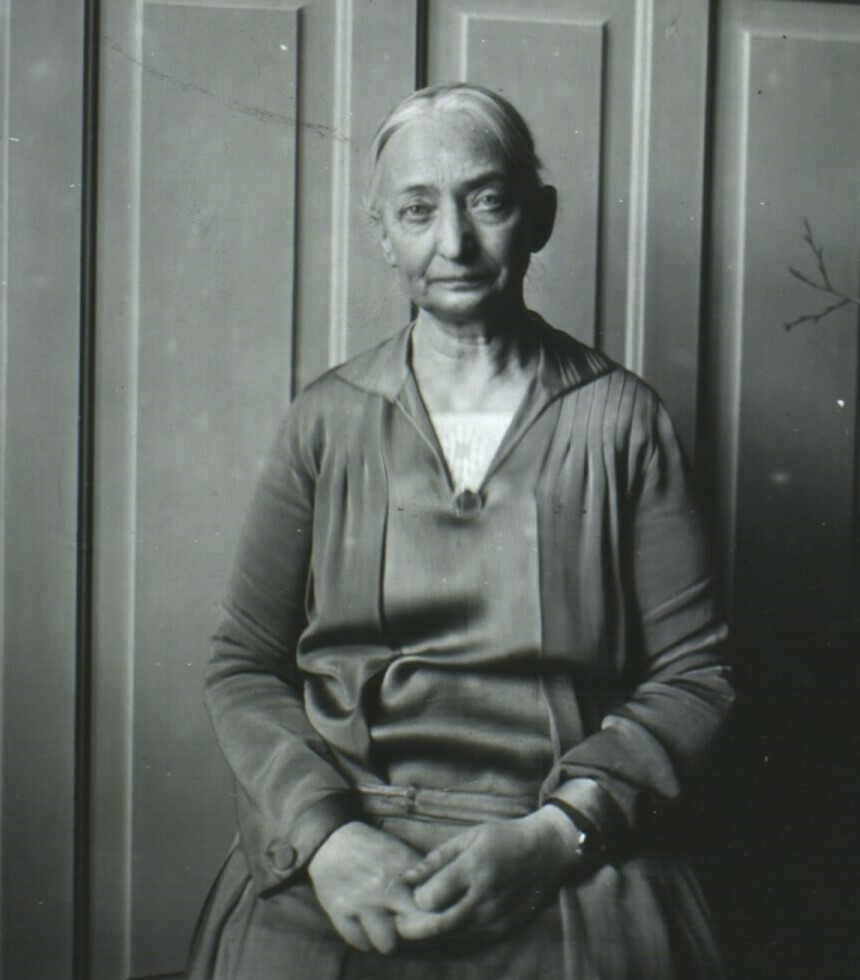
Anna Wulff, photographed by Holger Damgaard

Anna Wulff (13 August 1874, Frederiksberg — 7 January 1935, Søllerød) was a pioneering Danish kindergarten teacher. On the basis of experience she gained both from her mother and from a course at the Fröbel Foundation in Dresden, in 1897 she began training teachers to work in kindergartens in Denmark and in 1906 established Frøbelhøjskolen, a folk high school specializing in training kindergarten teachers. From 1915, she headed the Folkebørnehave på Christianshavn (Christianhavn Folk Kindergarten). Committed to Christian principles, Wulff ran her kindergarten as an extension to home-based parental upbringing, strengthening the children's character through close human relationships, activities promoting self-reliance, and play.

== Early life and education ==
Born in the Frederiksberg district of Copenhagen on 13 August 1874, Anna Wulff was the daughter of German parents who had emigrated to Denmark. Her father, Peter Wulff (1841–98), ran yjr P. Wulff cigar factory while his wife Emma Catharine Mathilde née Heydorn (1846–1926) took an interest in the pedagogues Johann Heinrich Pestalozzi from Switzerland and Friedrich Fröbel from Germany. She was the oldest of the family's seven children. Her mother arranged for the children to participate at home together with the neighbours' children in a German-language kindergarten with a Fröbel-educated instructor.

Anna Wulff attended Frk. Schou og Trolles Skole in Hellerup and took the general preparatory examination at N. Zahle's School. She then moved to Dresden where she studied at the Fröbel Foundation, taking the kindergarten teachers' examination in 1897. In 1906, she made study trips to England and Germany.

== Career ==
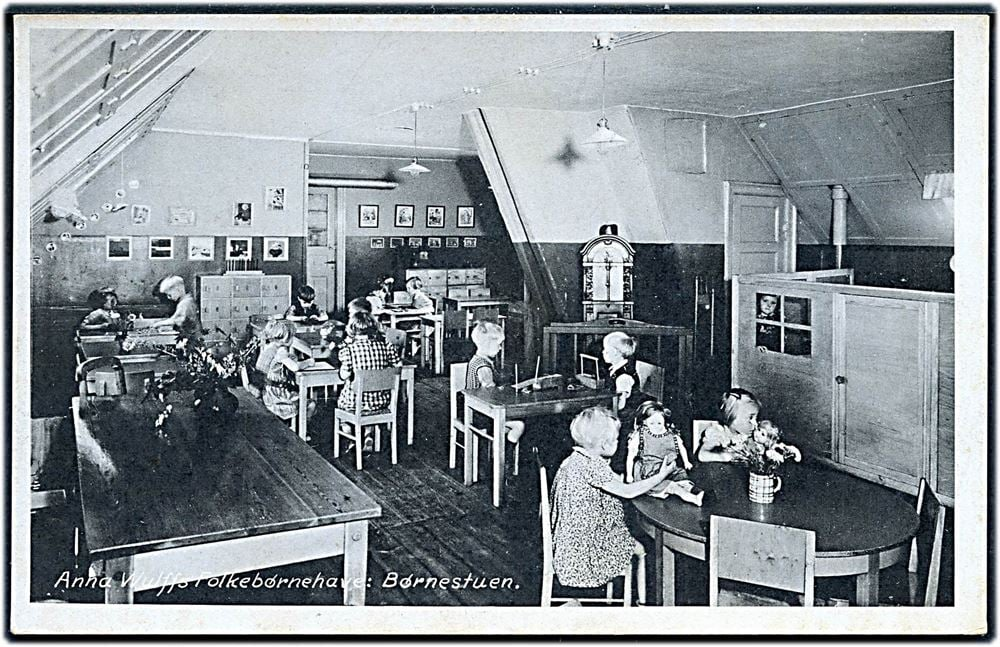
Anna Wilff's kindergarten at Prinsessegade 7 in Christianshavn.

On returning to Denmark, she first arranged a one-year course for kindergarten teachers at Schon og Trolles Skole where a new kindergarten had been established. In 1906, she separated the teachers' training department as a separate unit in rented premises at Karen Kærs Skole in the Nørrebro district of Copenhagen. In 1909, she provided a course over one and a half years for those studying to run kindergartens and the following year she named it as Frøbel-Hæjskolen (Fræbel Folk High School). The school also provided courses in workshop activities and music for primary school teachers. In 1918, courses were extended to two years and 20 students received qualifications. By the time she died in 1935, Wulff had trained 544 teachers. In addition, helped by the headmistress Helga Sahlertz, from 1915 she ran the Folkebørnehave på Christianshavn (Christianhavn Folk Kindergarten).

Anna Wulff died on 7 January 1935 in Copenhagen and is buried in Copenhagen's Assistens Cemetery. Anna Wulffs Børnehus is now located at Christianshavns Voldgade 63.
