= Falkoner Center =

Hotel and conference complex in Frederiksberg, Copenhagen, Denmark

Coordinates: 55°40′46″N 12°32′00″E

Scandic Falkoner Hotel & Conference Center
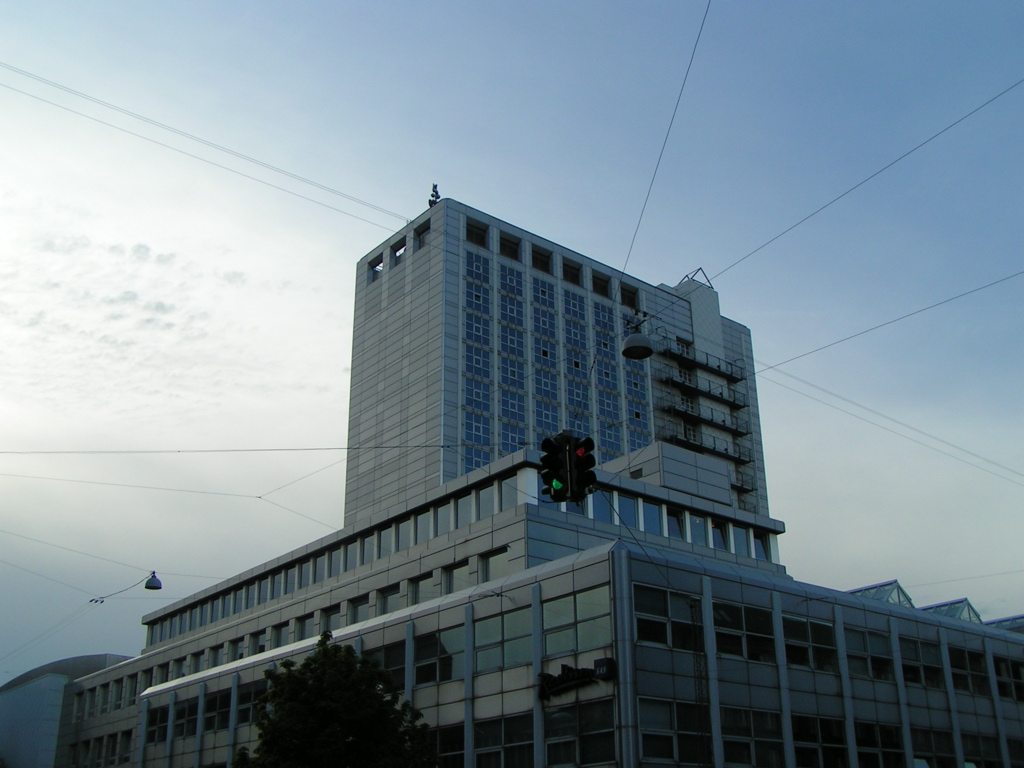
- Interactive map of Scandic Falkoner Hotel & Conference Center
- Address: 9 Falkoner Allé; DK-2000
- Location: Frederiksberg, Copenhagen

Construction
- Opened: 1950; 76 years ago
- Renovated: 1987

Website
- Official websiteCenter

Falkoner Centre (Danish: Falkoner Centret) is a hotel and conference complex located in the Frederiksberg district of Copenhagen, Denmark. It mainly consists of Scandic Falconer Hotel & Conference Centre. It has two venues which play host to both conferences such as concerts and shows.

== History ==
The corner of Falkoner Allé and Howitzvej where the centre complex now stands, was previously the site of Frederiksberg's first town hall which was built there in 1886 but torn down in 1953. The new centre was built between 1958 and 1959 to a Modernist design by Ole Hagen. It was the tallest building of Denmark from 1958 to 1960, when it was surpassed by the Radisson Blu Royal Hotel. It was the site of the last concert by Judy Garland on March 25, 1969, with opening act by singer Johnnie Ray. The Doors also played there as did Kiss. It was renovated in 1987 and given a new stainless steel cladding.

The hotel was previously owned by SAS but changed hands in connection with the company's sale of its hotel activities to Radisson Blu.

== Facilities ==
Falkoner Centre contains two venues. The larger one, Falkonersalen (formerly Falkoner Teatret), with a capacity of some 2,000 people, is mainly used for conferences and single-day events such as Annual general meeting. Falconer Teatret was a very popular venue for concerts during the 1970s and 1980s. The smaller one, Falkonerscenen, was originally a cinema but is now used for cultural activities such as concerts and theatrical performances and shows.

The four-starred Radisson Blu Falkoner Hotel has 140 rooms, 26 suites and the restaurant Backstage Bar &Restaurant.
