= Mariendalsvej =

Street in Frederiksberg Municipality, Denmark

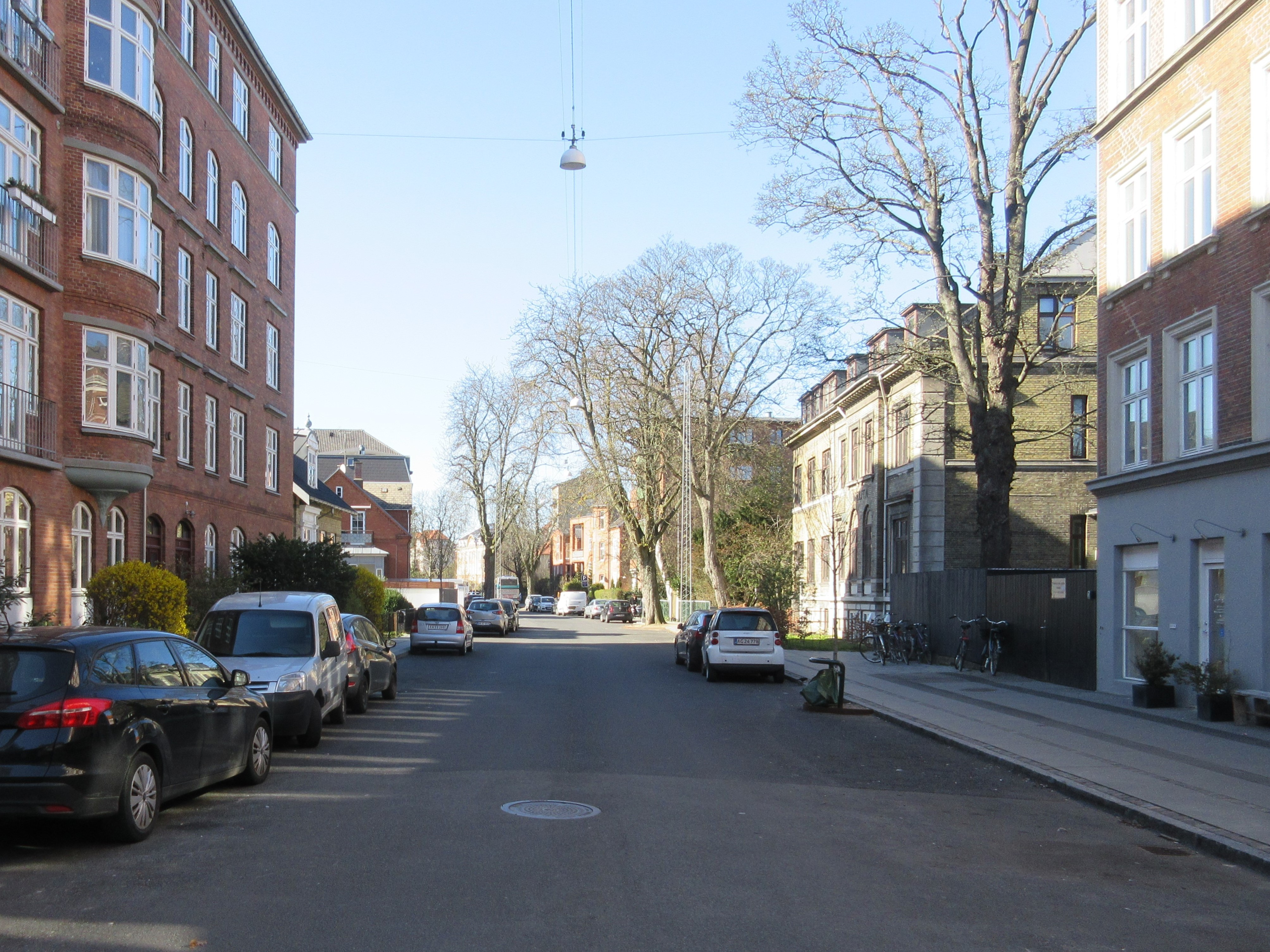
- Length: 1,340 m (4,400 ft)
- Location: Copenhagen, Denmark
- Quarter: Frederiksberg
- Postal code: 1619, 1859
- Nearest metro station: Frederiksberg
- Coordinates: 55°41′27.6″N 12°31′54.48″E
- Southeast end: Falkoner Allé
- Major junctions: Nordre Fasanvej
- Northwest end: Ring Line

Mariendalsvej is a street in the Frederiksberg district of Copenhagen, Denmark. It runs from Falkoner Allé in the southeast to the Ring Line in the northwest. The area to the southeast of Nordre Fasanvej runs through the Mariendal Quarter and the rest runs through the Fuglebakken neighbourhood.

== History ==
=== The Mariendal Quarter ===
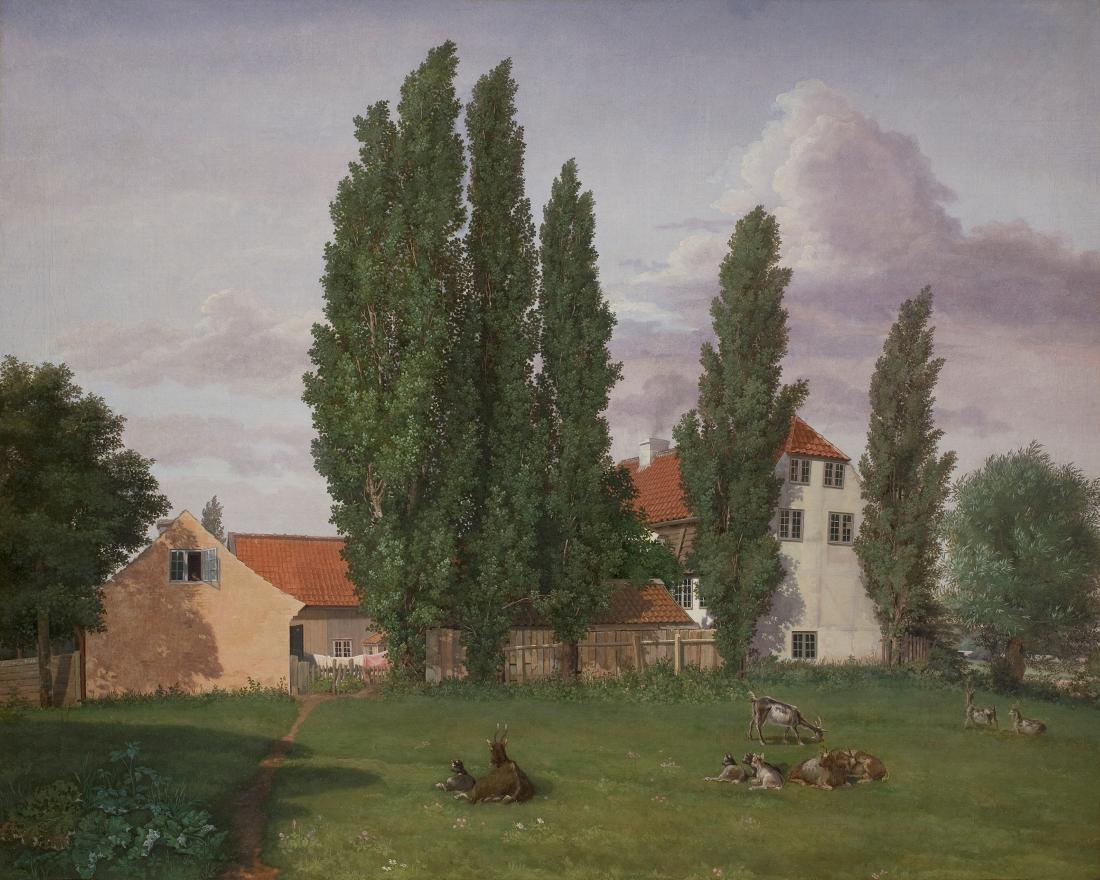
Marienlyst painted by Frederik Sødring in 1928

The street takes its name after the country house Mariendal which was located close to the beginning of the street. The estate was in 1980 acquired by the businessman Niels Josephsen. In 1884, he presented a master plan for a new neighbourhood and began to sell the land off in lots.

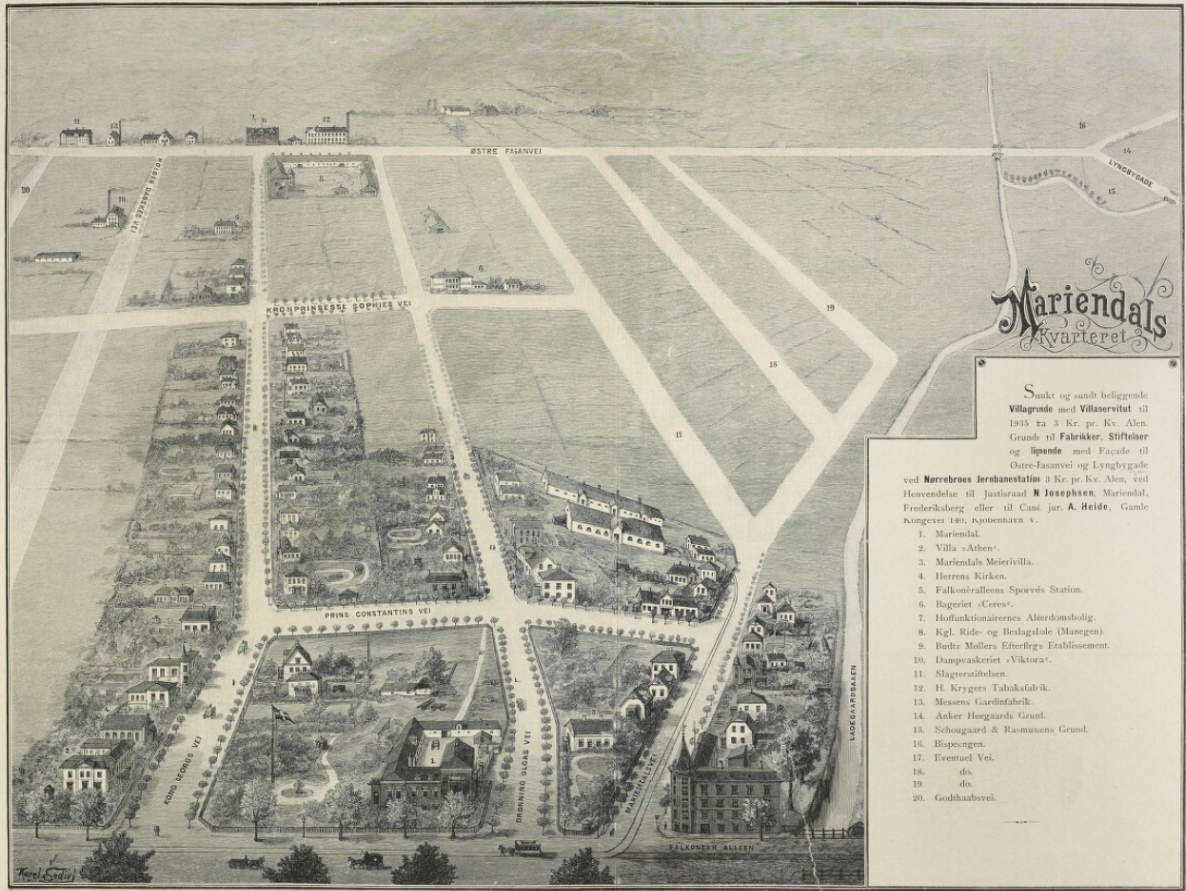
Drawing by Karel Šedivý with a bird's eye view of the new Mariendal Quarter, 1900

The other streets in the neighborhood were named after his family (Nitivej, Thoravej, Ane Katrines Vej) or the Greek royalty (Dronning Olgas Vej, Kong Georgs Vej, Prins Georgs Vej, Kronprinsesse Sofies Vej). He was also responsible for constructing Østre Fasanvej at the northwestern margin of the neighborhood. This street was later extended by the city and is now part of Nordre Fasanvej. Josephsen paid for the construction of Mariendal Church out of his own pocket and gave a number of lots away for charitable housing projects or sold them at very favourable conditions. The land along Østre Fasanvej was mainly used for industrial developments. Weilbach & Cohn's Fabriker inaugurated a new factory on Mariendalsvej (No. 57) in 1898.

=== The Fuglebakken Quarter ===
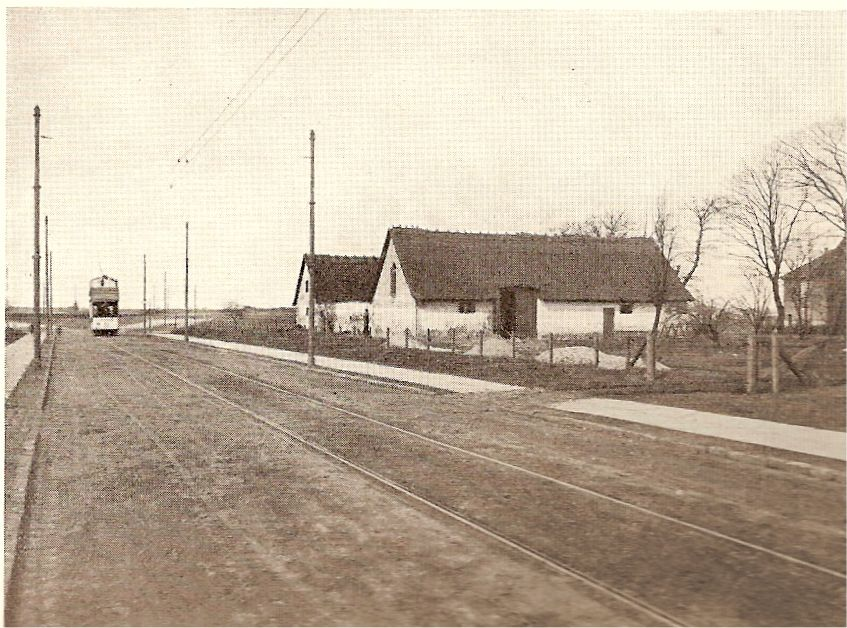
Tram on Mariendalsvej with Lille Godthåb seen to the right

The land on the other side of Østre Fasanvej had historically belonged to Store Godthåb but had in the late 18th century been sold to the two new country houses Fuglebakken and Lille Godthåb. In about 1900, it was acquired by a consortium and Mariendalsvej was extended as part of the plans for redevelopment of the area. Development was accelerated by the extension of a tram line to a tram loop at present day Kristian Zartmanns Plads in 1905. The central part of the Fuglebakken area was built over with single family detached homes and terraced houses over the next three decades while taller buildings were constructed along its edges. The area between Vagtelvej and the railway in the westernmost part of the area was the site of an industrial zone until the 1960s when the industrial buildings were replaced by 8 large apartment blocks. The area was served by trams from 1905.

== Notable buildings and residents ==
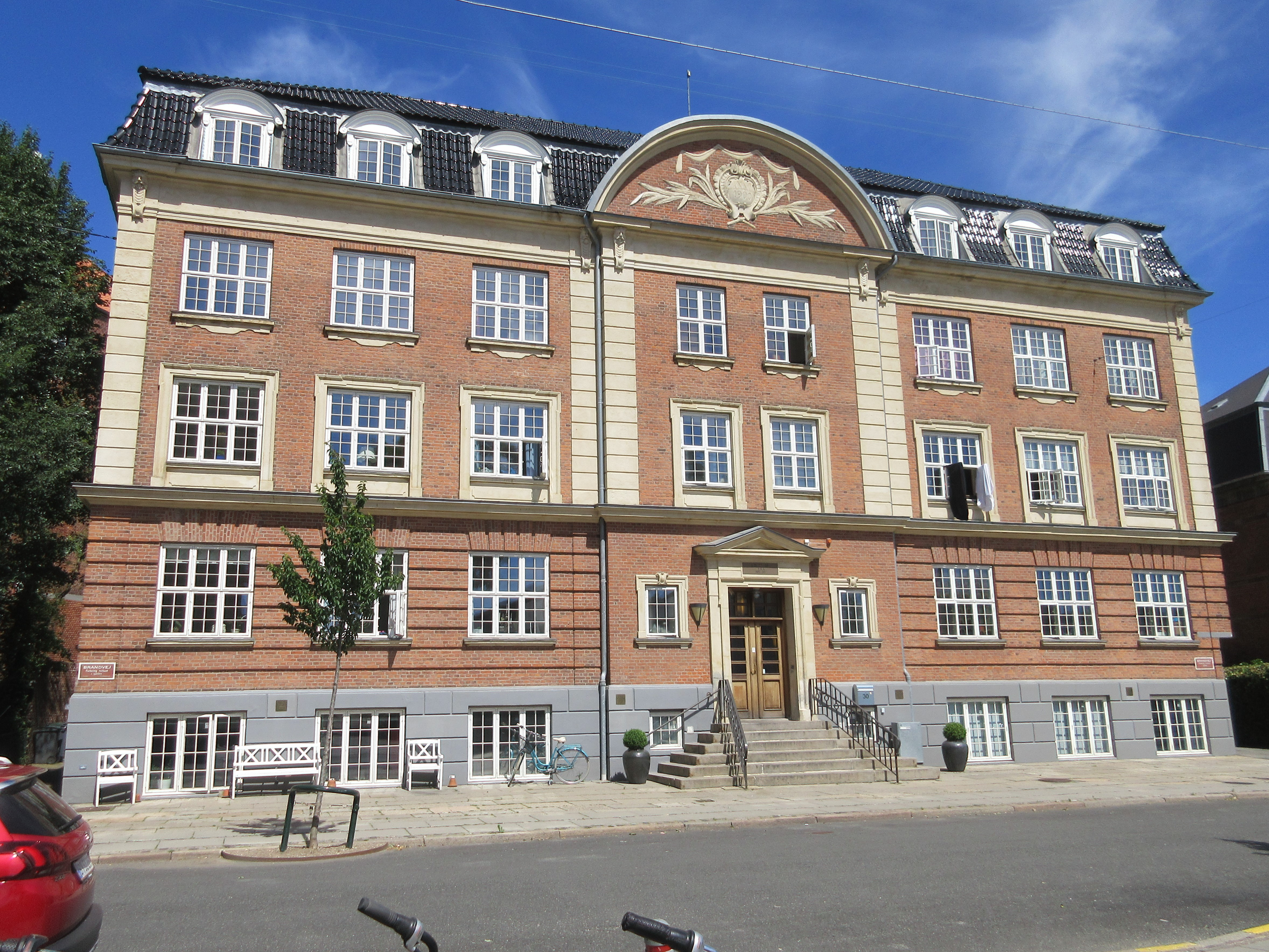
No. 30

Hjem for arbejdsdygtige blinde Kvinder at No. 30 is from 1900 and was designed by David Wilhelm Leerbeck. Post- og Telegrafembedsmændenes Stiftelse at No. 38-40 is a charitable housing estate built to provide housing for former employees of the Royal Danish Mail. It is from 1902 and was designed by Thorvald Bindesbøll. The building for female municipal primary school teachers from 1900 was designed by Anton Haunstrup. Stiftelse for Handelsrejsende at No. 36 is a charitable housing estate built for travelling salesmen. It is from 1949 and was designed by Arthur Wittmaack.

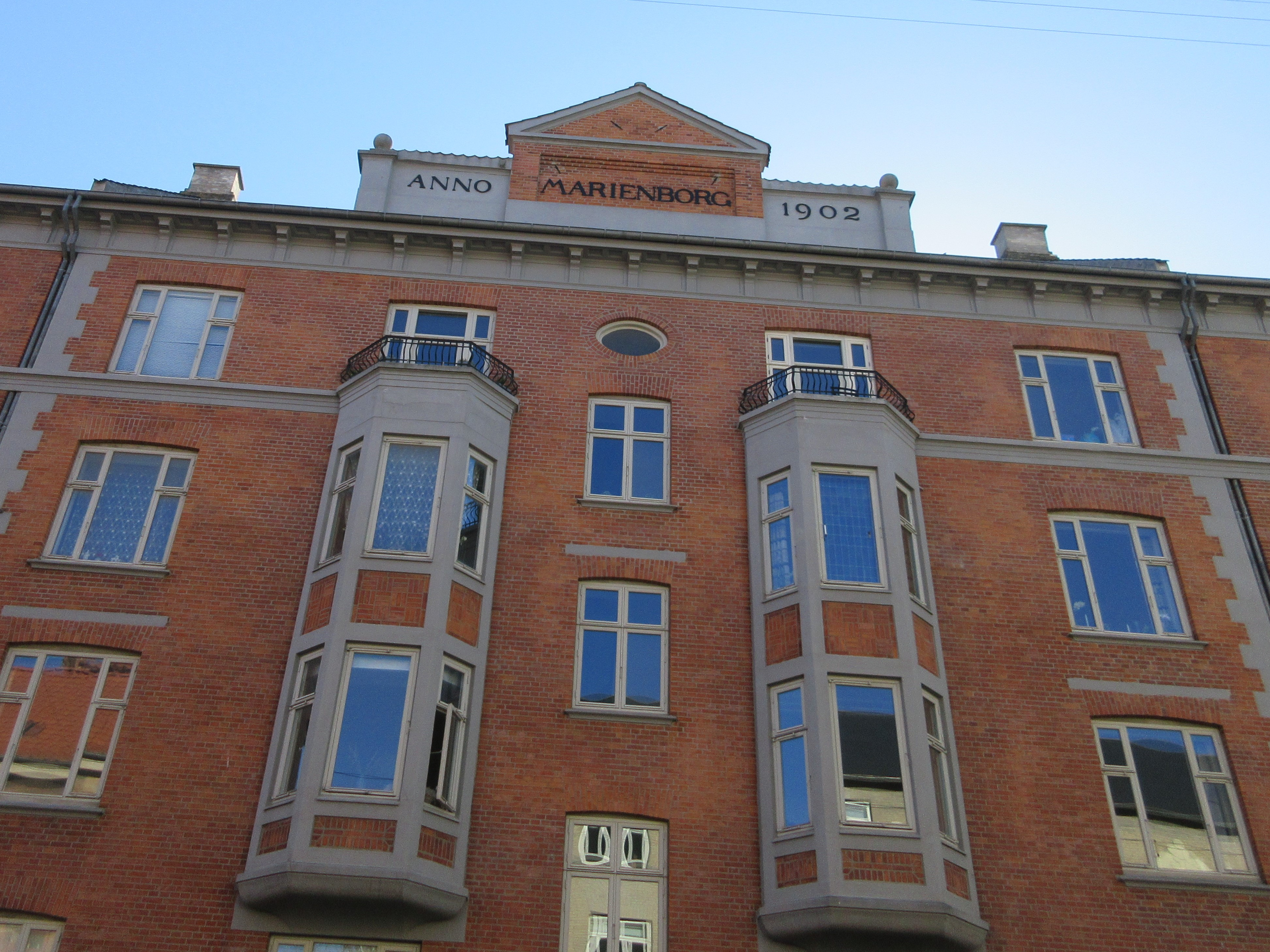
No. 33: Marienborg

The building at No. 46 is the former headquarters of Henriques & Løvengreen's Trikotagefabrikker, a former manufacturer of knitted hosiery founded by Michael Henriques and Malmö-based Oluf Johannes and Gustav Løvengreen in 1897.

Built in 1905 to design by Ulrik Plesner, Mariendalsvej 62-64 was built to provide housing for workers.

The villa at Mariendalsvej 77 was designed by Hans Koch in collaboration with Carl Petersen for Harald Moltke in 1912. Hans Koch also designed Kristian Zahrtmann's villa at Kristian Zahrtmanns Plads 79 from 1913.
