= Falkonergården =

Coordinates: 55.6872°N 12.5411°E

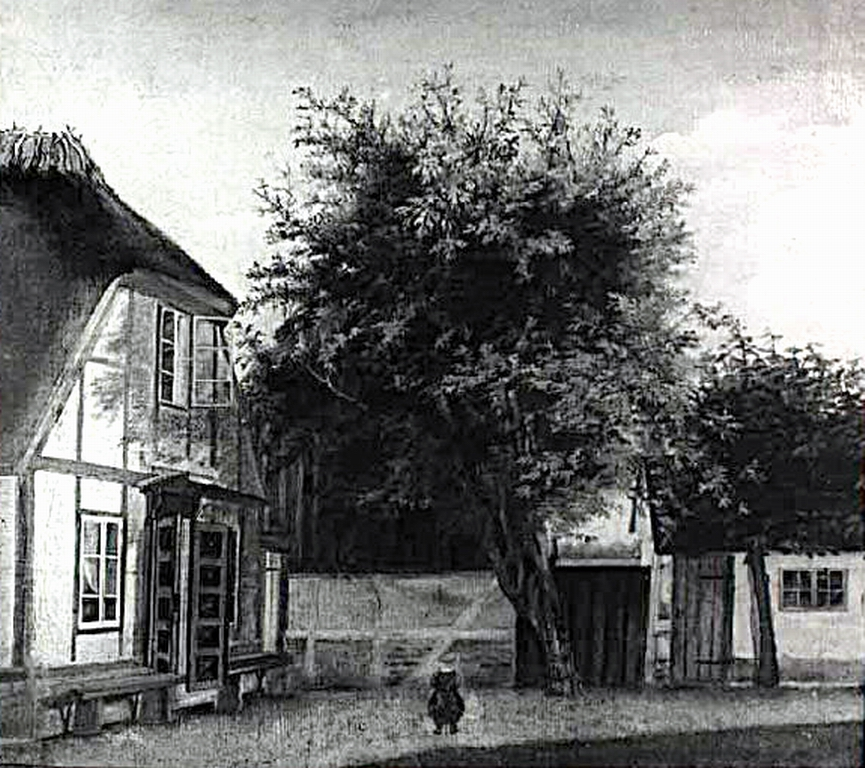
Falkonergården in 1850

Falkonergården (lit. 'The Falkoner's House') was a royal Danish facility for stabling of peregrine falcons for falconry located in Frederiksberg outside Copenhagen from 1670. It closed in 1810 and the buildings have been demolished except for one wing which is still seen in an alley off Falkoner Allé (between No. 112 and No. 120). Falkonergården is commemorated in Frederiksberg Municipality's shield as well as in the names of several buildings and public spaces.

== History ==
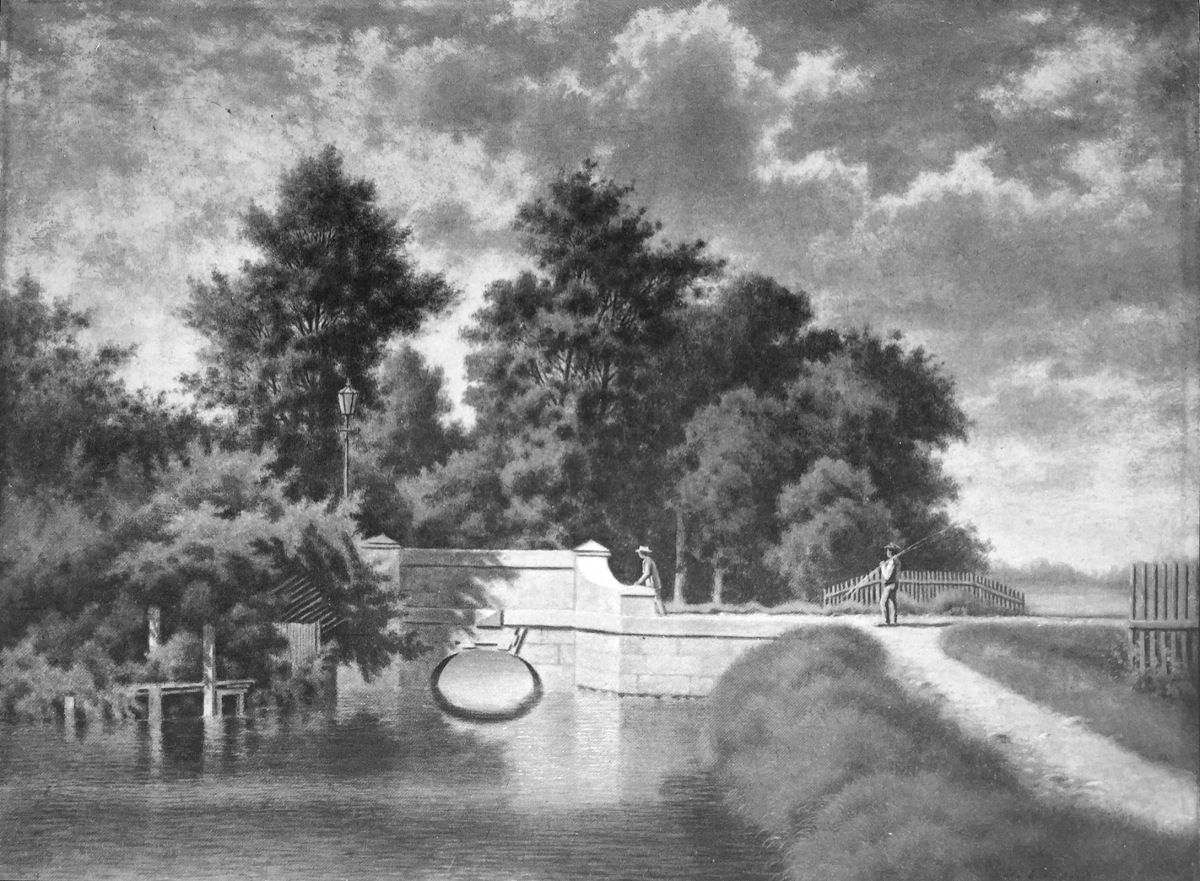
The bridge between Falkoner Allé and Jagtvej viewed from the east

In 1662, Crown Prince Christian went on a European journey which took him to Louis XIV's court where he was first introduced to falconry. Back in Denmark, he established Falkonergården as a facility for stabling of peregrine falcons in 1670. It was situated next to the Ladegård Canal at his mother Queen Sophie Amalie's new summer retreat Prinsessegården in Hollænderbyen (as Frederiksberg was then called) to the west of Copenhagen. The peregrine falcons were annually brought home from Iceland and Norway, which were then ruled from Denmark. The birds were used by the king for falconry but also as highly praised gifts for foreign rulers by the Danish kings on their journeys abroad. Falkonergården was in the beginning referred to as Jagt-Huset ("The Hunting House") and occasionally also used for stabling of the king's hunting dogs.

The street Falkoner Allé is Falkonergården's former driveway and was former driveway and was gated at each end. A stone bridge was built across the Ladegård Canal from where a track ran north, providing royal hunting parties with a shortcut on their way to Jægersborg Dyrehave. It was expanded into a wider, tree-lined avenue used for hunting in 1750 and later developed into the busy thoroughfare Jagtvej.

Falkoner Allé was opened to the public after Hømarken (literally "Hayfield"), an area to the north belonging to Ladegården, originally a farm under Copenhagen Castle, was auctioned off. The Falkonergården closed in 1810 and the last falcons were gifted to the Portuguese court. The buildings were then used as a wax candle factory. It produced perfume and soap under the name Falkonergårdens Fabrikker ("Falkonergården's Factories"( until the 1910s. The buildings were then torn down except for a single wing which is still seen in the alley between No. 112 and No. 120.

== Legacy ==
Coat of arms of Frederiksberg

The shield of Frederiksberg Municipality features three falcons in commemoration of Falkonergården and the role it has played in the municipality's history. One of two memorial fountains on Sankt Thomas Plads feature a falconer. Falkonergården is also commemorated in the toponyms Falkoner Allé and Falkoner Plads (Falconer Square).

Falkonergårdens Gymnasium was named after Falkonergården in 1919 in spite of the fact that it unlike Frederiksberg Gymnasium, Frederiksberg's other public gymnasium, is located far from Falkonergården's historic location. Its former name was Dr. Priemes Vejs Gymnasium. Other buildings with references to falcons in their names include Falconer Center, Tre Falke Skole (Three Falcons School) and Tre Galke Hallen (Three Falcons Hall).

== See also ==
- Par force hunting landscape in North Zealand
