= P. Wulff =

Cigar Manufacturer

P. Wulff was a Danish manufacturer of cigars based in Copenhagen, Denmark. It was founded in 1868 and merged into Scandinavian Tobacco Group in 1975.

== History ==
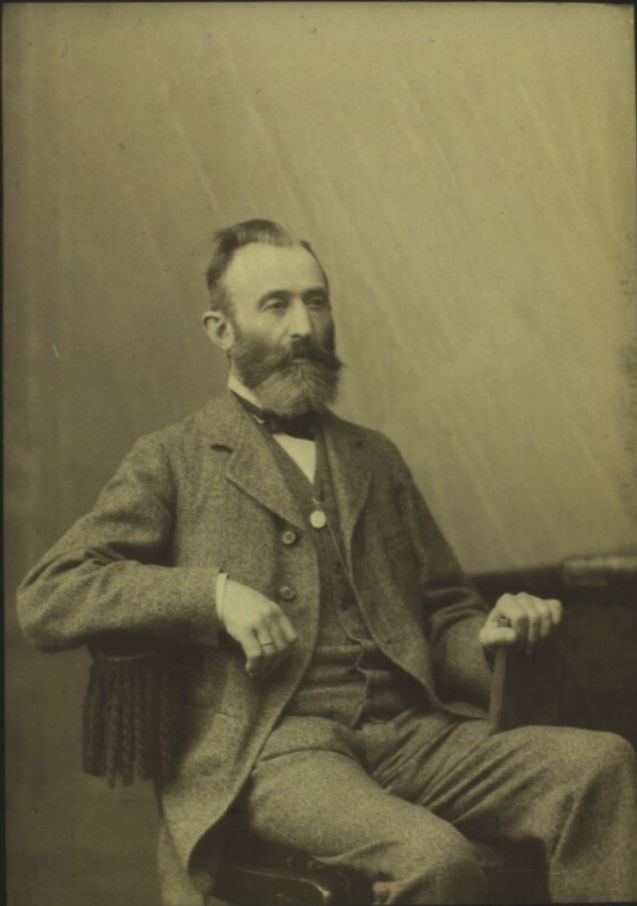
Peter Wulff

The company was founded by Peter Wulff (1841–1898) in September 1868. The factory was located at Vester Voldgade 11 but moved to new premises at Holbergsgade 18 in 1879. Wulff's brother-in-law, H. C. M. Heydorn (1851–1914), was a partner in the company from 1883 to 1888.

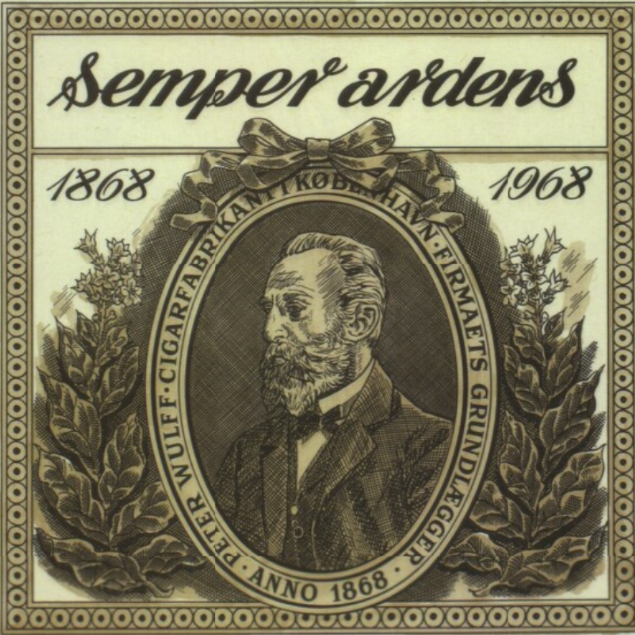
Advertisement

The company was afterWulff 's death in 1898 continued by his widow Emma f. Heydorn (1846–1926) . Peter and Emma Wulff's eldest son, Oskar Wulff (1875–1946), worked for the company and became a partner in 1901. The company relocated to Toldbodvej 6 (now Esplanaden 6–10) in 1907.

Peter and Emma Wulff's second eldest son, Paul Wulff (1877–1941), who had been part of the management since 1805, became a partner when his mother gave up her share of the company in 1913.

A new factory was established at Sølvgade 38 but the activities moved on again when the company acquired Herman Kruger's former tobacco factory at Nordre Fasanvej 111–115 in 1916.

Oskar Wulff retired from the company in 1934. The company rented two floors in an industrial building at Polensgade 25 in 1935 and purchased the whole building in September 1938.

The building was converted into a limited company (aktieselskab'aktieselskab')) in 1839. The board consisted of Paul Wulff (chairman), Heinrich Wulff (born 1880) and barrister Karsten Meyer (born 1887). Paul Wulff's two sons, Hans Wulff (born 16 April 1904) and Carl Wulff (born 25 March 1906), were managing directors of the company.

The market for cigars began to decline in the mid-1950s. The Wulff family sold the company to Scandinavian Tobacco Group in 1975

== Legacy ==
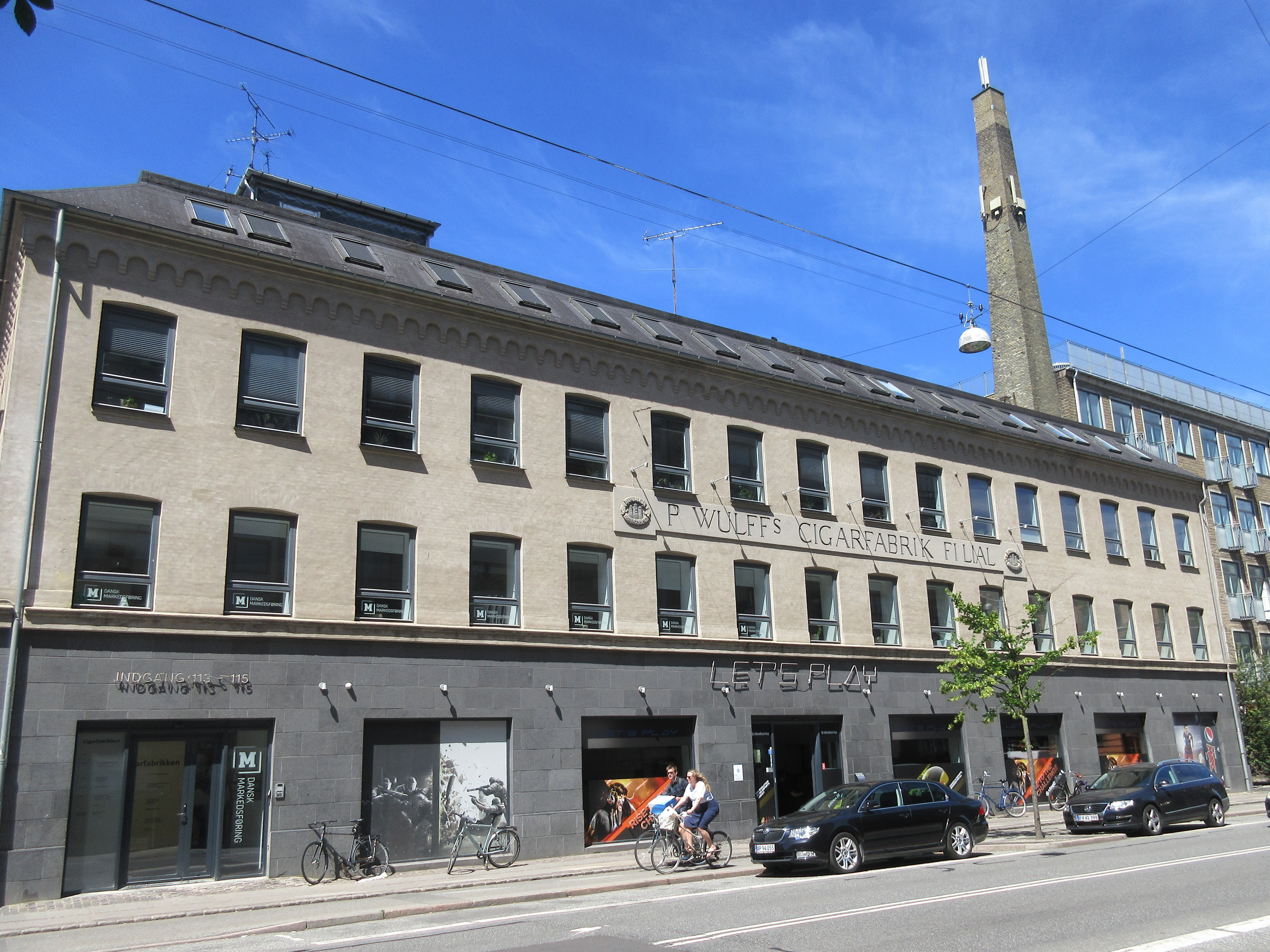
The former factory at Nordre Fasanvej 111–15

The factory at Nordre Fasanvej 111–15 has survived but the yellow brick facade with the name of the company has been dressed. The factory building in Polensgade has been demolished.
