= Fasanvej =

Street in Frederiksberg Municipality, Denmark

Nordre and Sønder Fasanvej
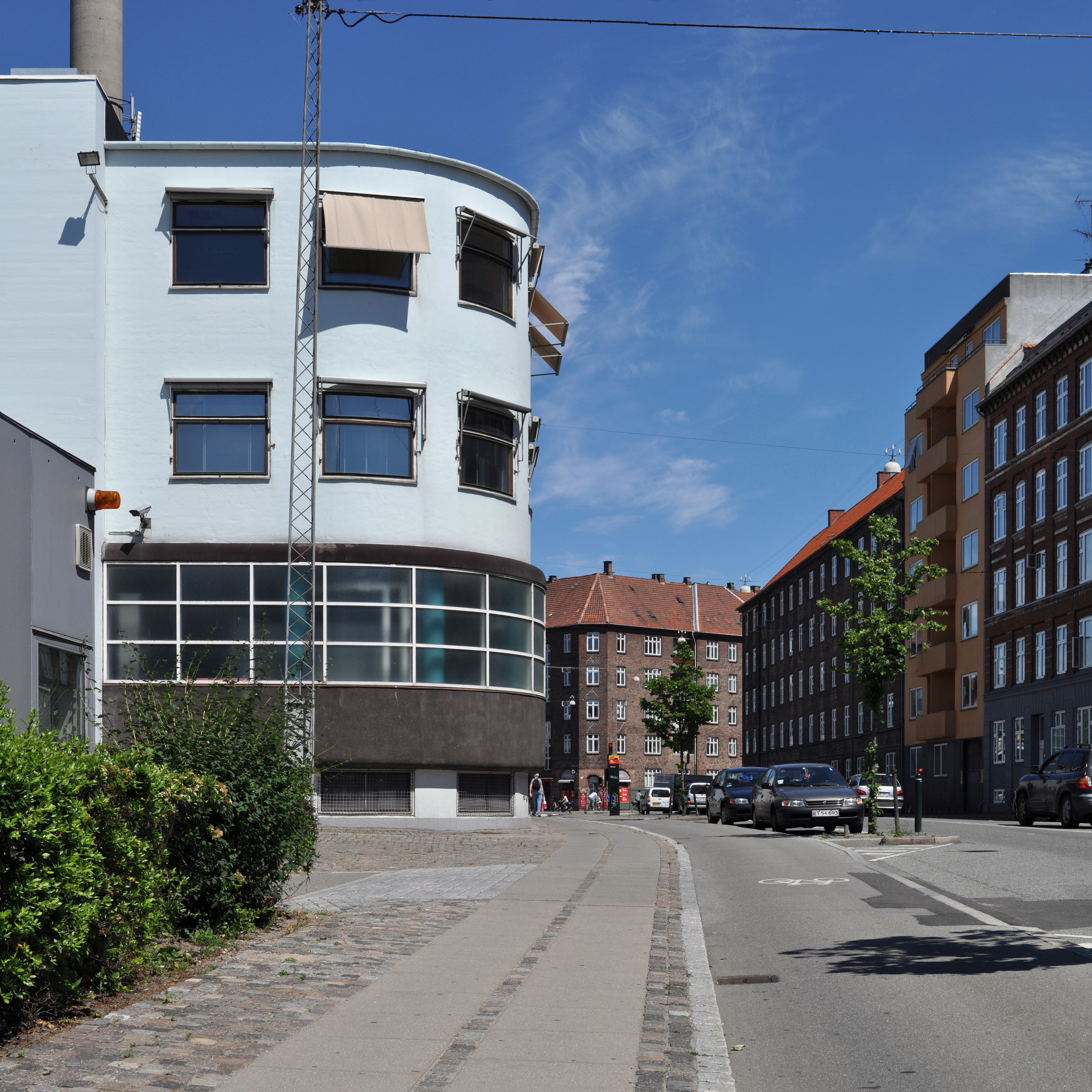
- Nordre Fasanvej with the Novozymes factory
- Interactive map of Nordre and Sønder Fasanvej
- Length: 2,000 m (6,600 ft)
- Location: Frederiksberg Bispebjerg, Nørrebro
- Postal code: 2000 (No. 1-221), 220 (222-263) and 2400 (254-
- Nearest metro station: Fasanvej, Nørrebro
- Coordinates: 55°41′19.32″N 12°31′41.88″E

Søndre and Nordre Fasanvej (literally South and North Pheasant Road) are two streets that form a lengthy south-to-north artery through Frederiksberg, an independent municipality surrounded by the larger Copenhagen Municipality in Copenhagen, Denmark. The southern part of the street is characterized by large green spaces and attractive residential neighborhoods. In contrast, its northern part, extending into the Nørrebro and North-West districts of Copenhagen, is marked by former industrial sites. The street is named after Fasangården, a former royal pheasantry located in Frederiksberg Park.

== Location ==
Søndre Fasanvej begins at Valby Langgade and continues along the western edge of Søndermarken and Frederiksberg Gardens to Smallegade, intersecting with Roskildevej along the route. It then proceeds as Nordre Fasanvej, crossing several major arteries, including Nylandsvej, Godthåbsvej, Borups Allé, and Hillerødgade, before reaching Frederikssundsvej.

== History ==
The oldest part of Søndre Fasanvej, north of Roskildevej, was established in 1682 as an access road to the royal pheasantry behind Frederiksberg Gardens. The road was later extended northward to Smallegade. The southern part of present-day Søndre Fasanvej, between Valby Langgade and Roskildevej, was created in approximately 1870 as a driveway to a small cluster of nurseries. It was first known as Bag Søndermarken (literally "Behind Søndermarken") but was incorporated into Søndre Fasanvej in approximately 1900.

In 1884, Nordre Fasanvej was extended northwards to Gofthåbsvej. From there, it continued as Østre Fasanvej to the new street Holger Danskes Vej. A few years later, Nordre Fasanvej continued to extend in stages by private landowner Niels Josefsen as part of his Mariendal estate to Hillerødgade, then Lyngbygade.

In 1908. Copenhagen Municipality continued Østre Fasanvej northwards to Frederikssundsvej. In 1918, Østre Fasanvej was merged into Nordre Fasanvej The section north of Godthåbsvej was, until 1920, called Østre Fasanvej (East Pheasant Road).

=== Buildings ===
Many of the new buildings along the road were industrial enterprises. The Royal Porcelain Factory had acquired the site at the corner of Søndre Fasanvej and Smallegade in 1884. Frederiksberg Paper Factory (No. 43) was established by Jean Christian Ferslew in 1881 as a supplier of paper for his growing newspaper empire. In 1892, Herman Jrüger inaugurated a new tobacco factory at Østre Fasanvej 32. The products were sold from Jrüger's tobacco shop at Købmagergade 67–69. The department store Messen operated a curtain factory a little further down the road. Slagterstiftelsen was built by the Butchers' Guild to provide affordable accommodation for elderly and needy butchers. Hoffunktionærenes Alderdomshjem was a retirement home for retired court officials.

A new Frederiksberg Hospital was built on the street in 1903, replacing the old hospital at Howitzvej.

== Notable buildings and residents ==
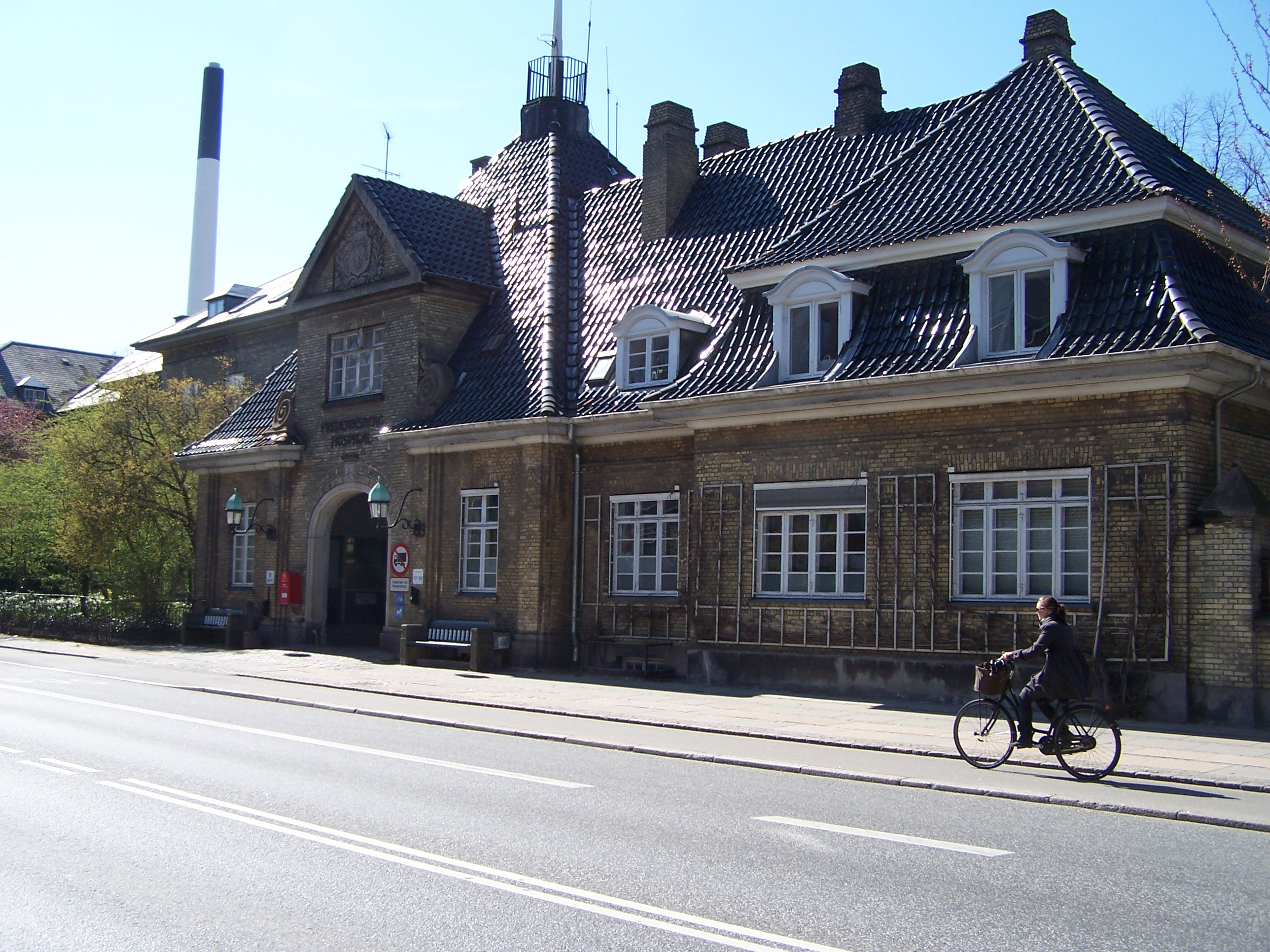
Frederiksberg Hospital

The west side of Søndre Fasanvej, opposite the big parks, is dominated by areas of single-family detached homes and apartment buildings from the 1880s. Diakonissestiftelsen's development, located on the corner with Peter Bangs Vej, dates from the same time. Across the street from Diakonissestiftelsen is the former industrial site of the Royal Copenhagen porcelain manufactury, which has been transformed into a mixed-use neighbourhood now known as Porcelænshaven (literally "The Porcelain Garden"). The main entrance of Frederiksberg Hospital is located at No. 57. Its gatehouse is built in the Neo-Baroque style.

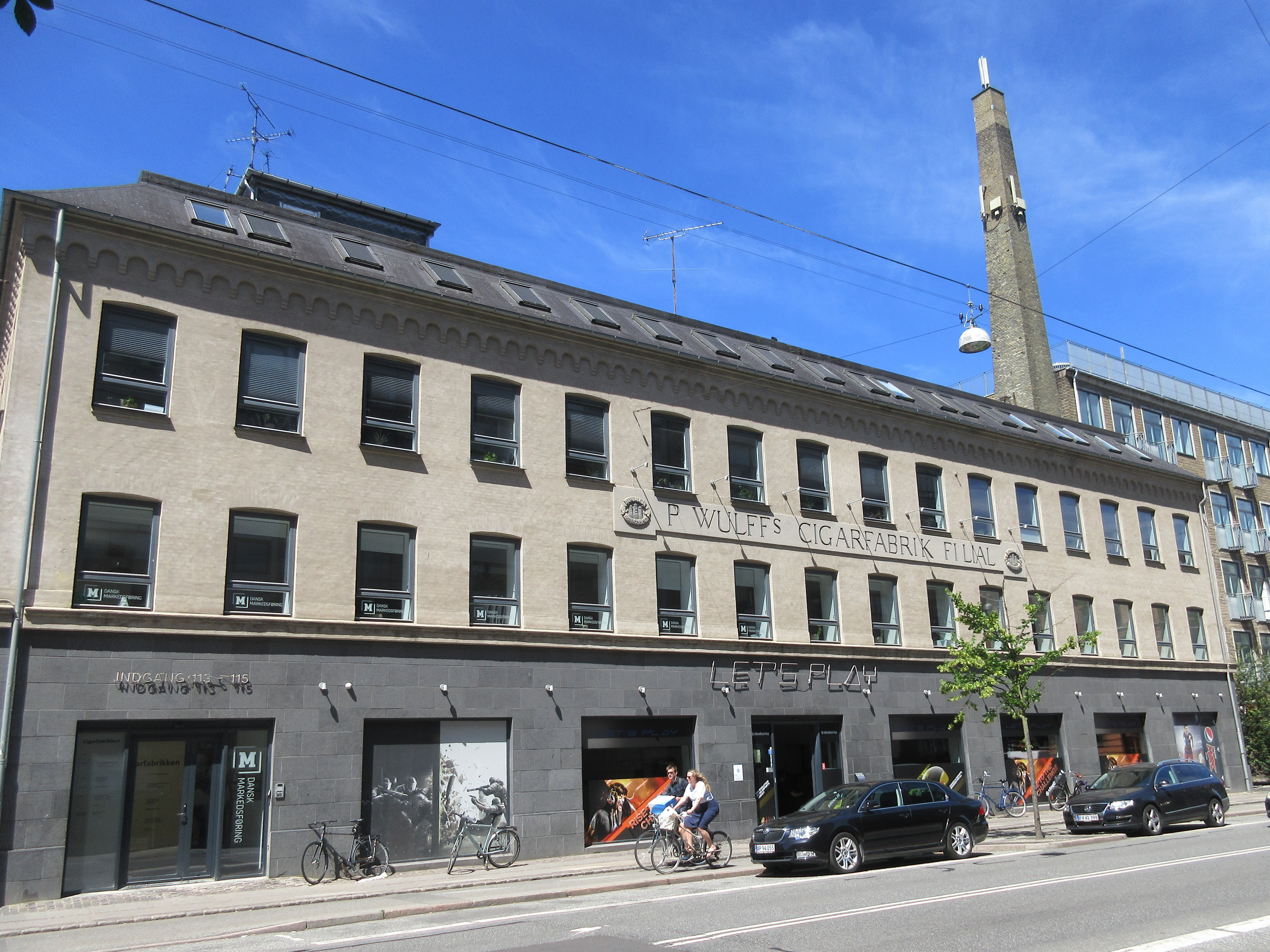
No. 111-115:P. Wulff's former cigar factory

Nordre Fasanvej is home to some early examples of functionalist architecture. The Green Funkis Building at No. 78 was built in 1932 to be designed by Hans Dahlerup-Berthelsen. The company Novozymes has a factory at the Nørrebro end of Nordre Fasanvej. The oldest part of the complex is a former dairy where enzyme production–an important part of Novozymes's business–was started. The complex was expanded by Arne Jacobsen in 1934 and again in 1962. P. Wulff's former cigar factory is located at No. 111-115.

== Public art ==
In front of the former Royal Porcelain Factory Main Building on Søndre Fasanvej stands Georg Jensen's bronze sculpture En høstmand (1915).

== Transport ==
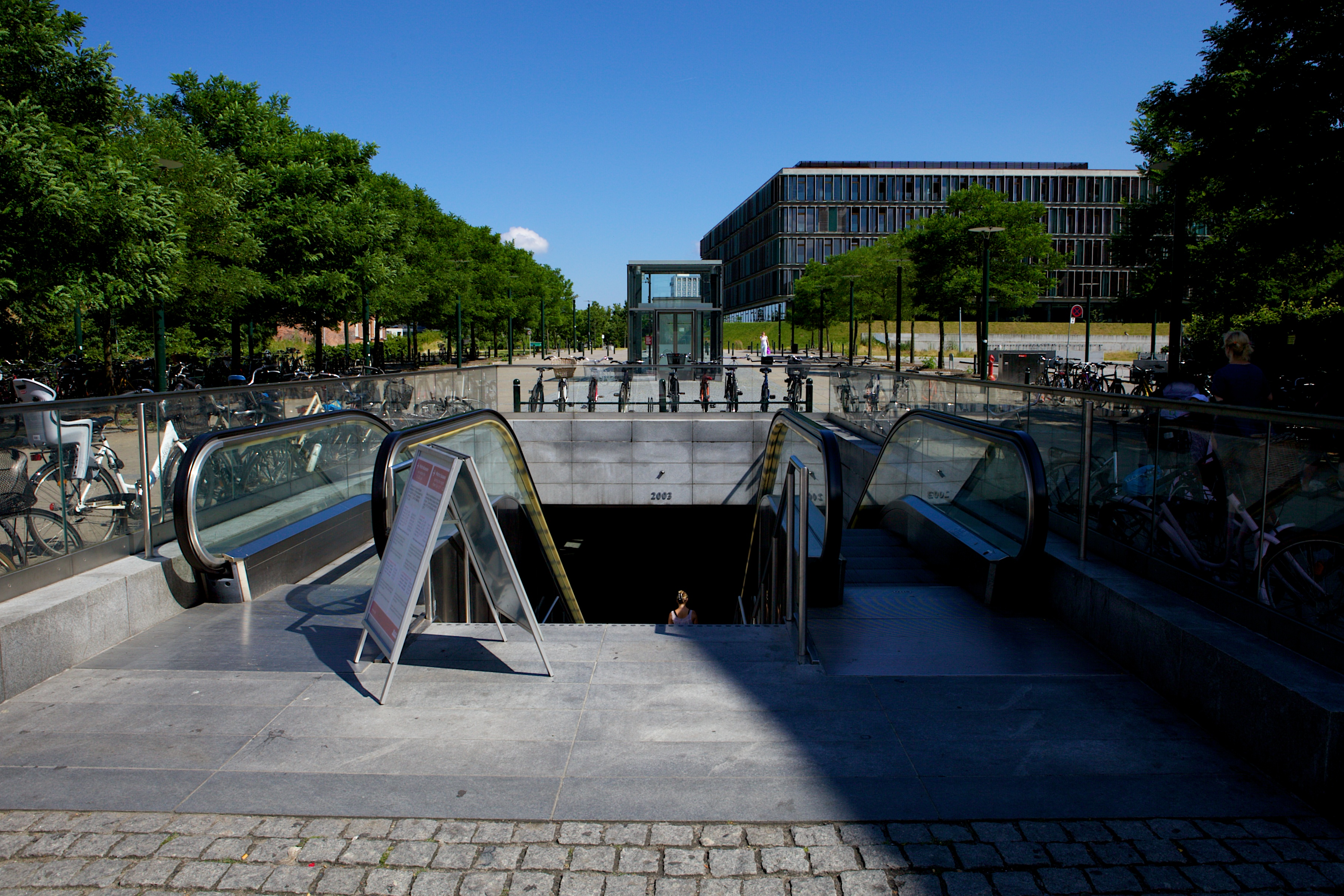
Fasanvej metro station

The underground Fasanvej Station is located at the southern end of Nordre Fasanvej, halfway between Smallegade and Nyelandsvej. It serves the M1 and M2 lines of the Copenhagen Metro.

Nørrebro station is located at Frederikssundsvej, at the northern end of the street. It serves the Ring Line of the S-train network.

== Gallery ==
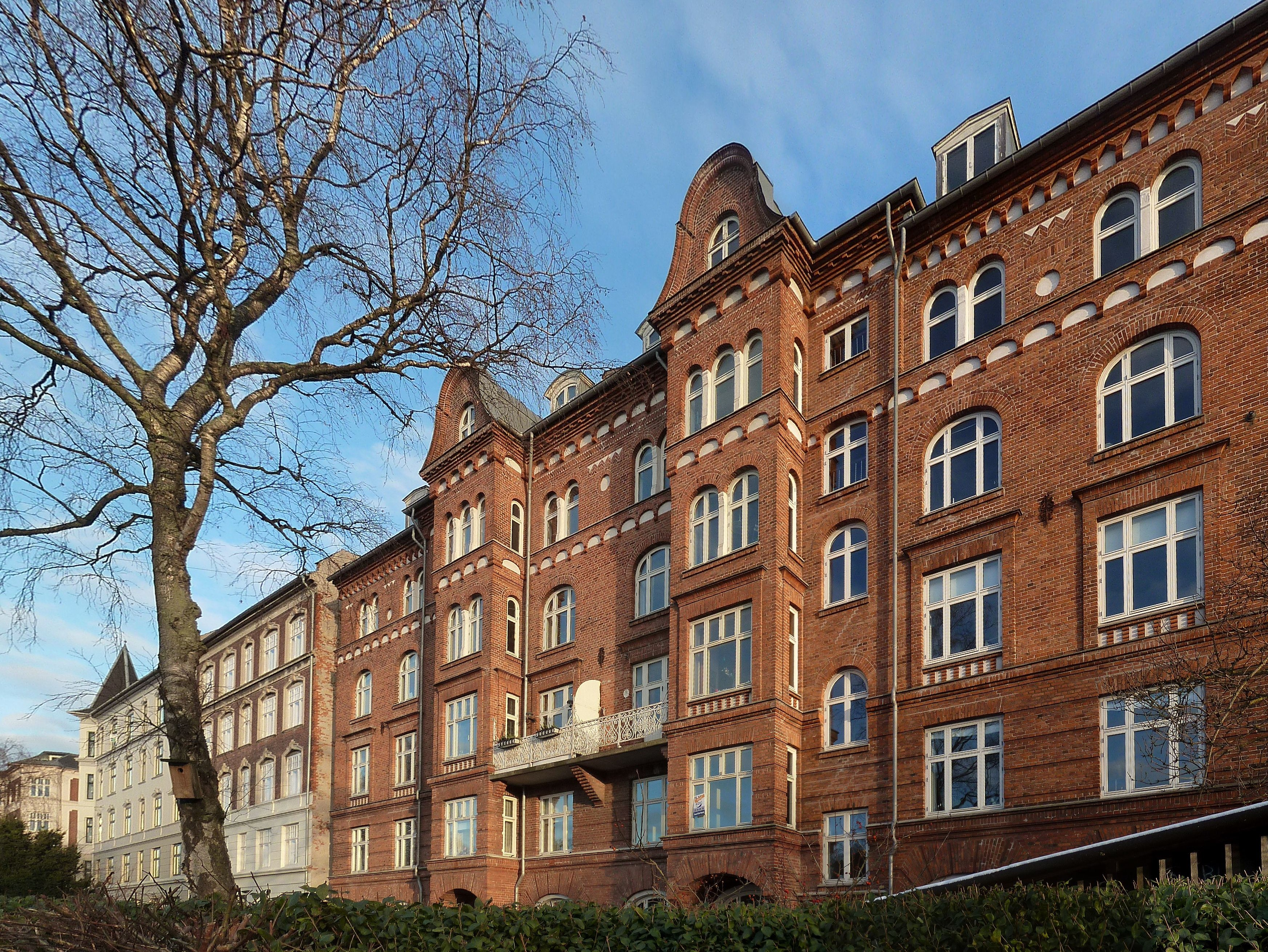
Apartment building from 1903 at 69 Nordre Fasanvej

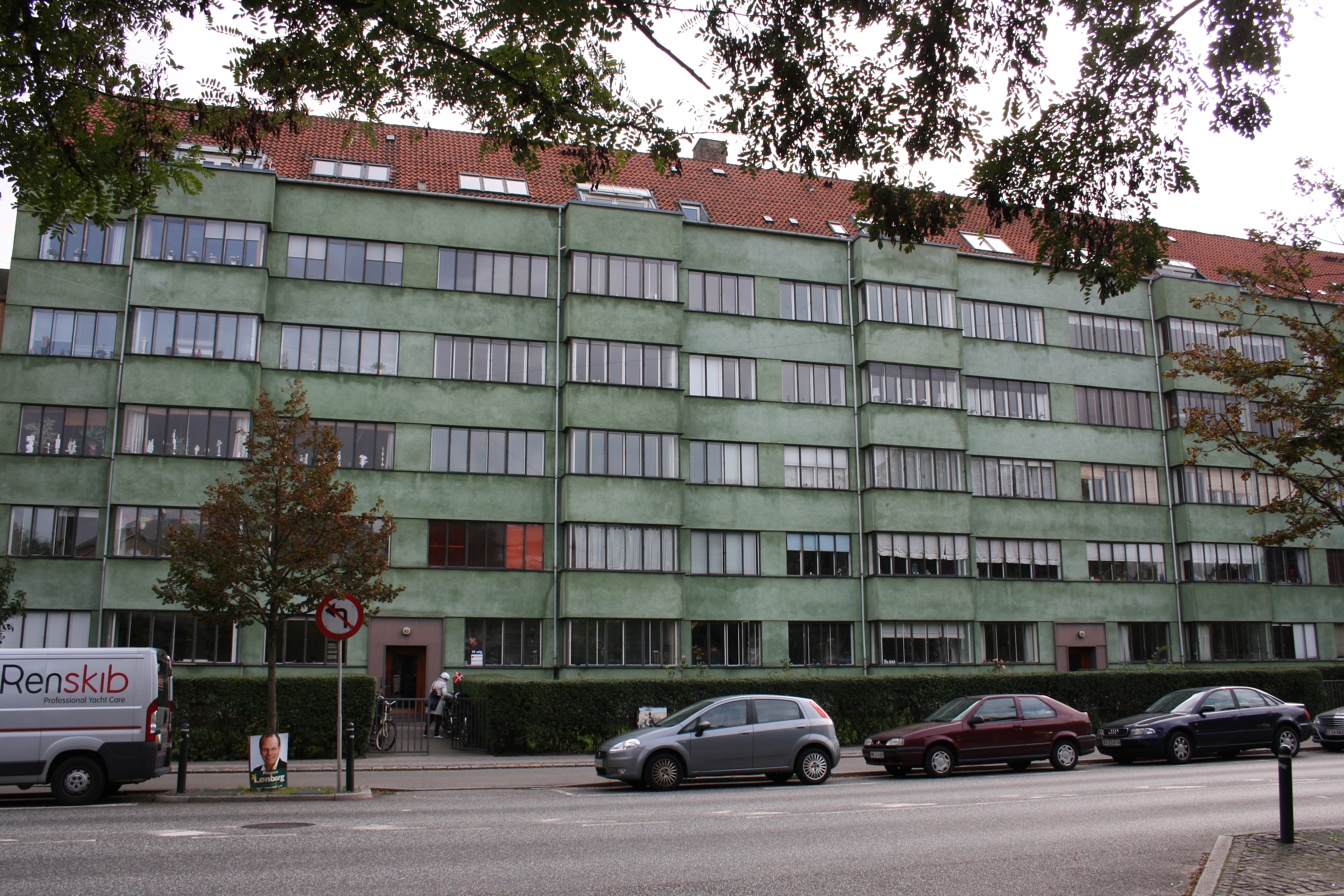
The Green Funkis Building

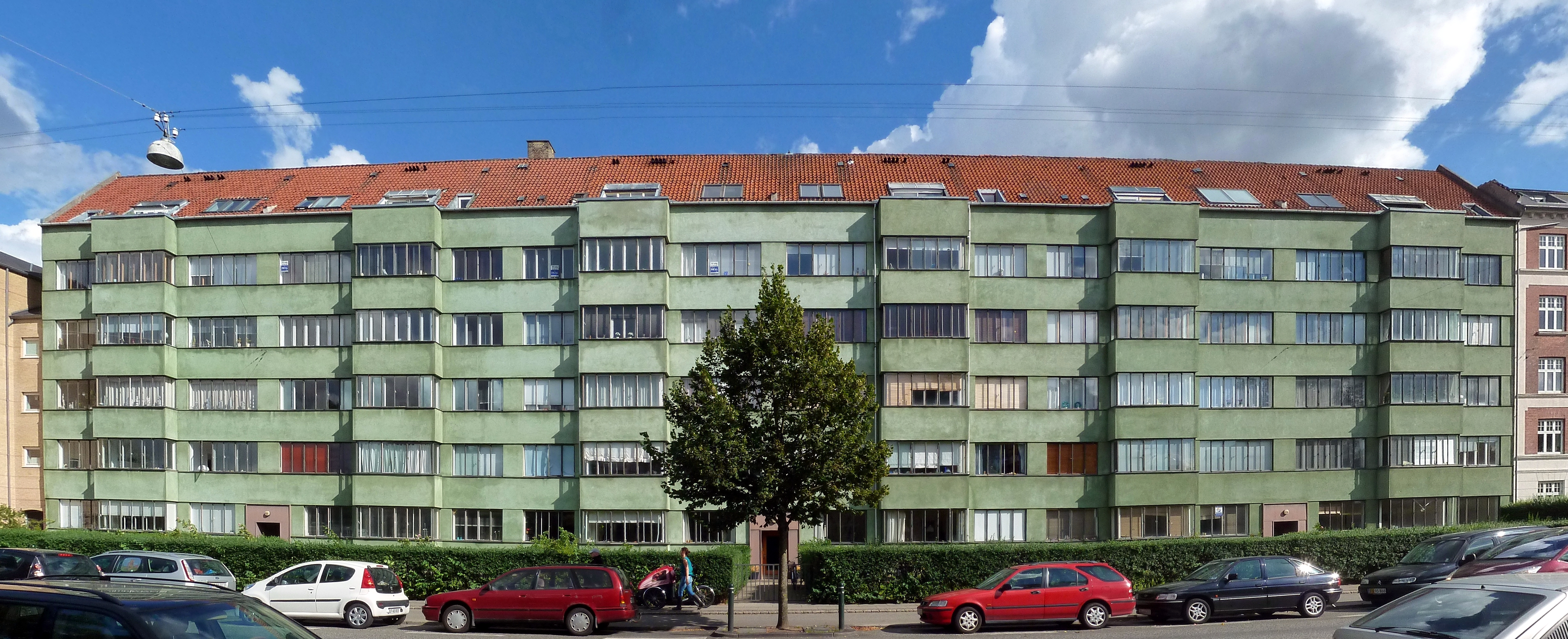
The Green Funkis Building shown as a panorama

== See also ==
- Frederiksberg Allé
- Borups Allé
- Søndre Fasanvej
