= Falkoner Allé =

Street in Frederiksberg, Copenhagen, Denmark

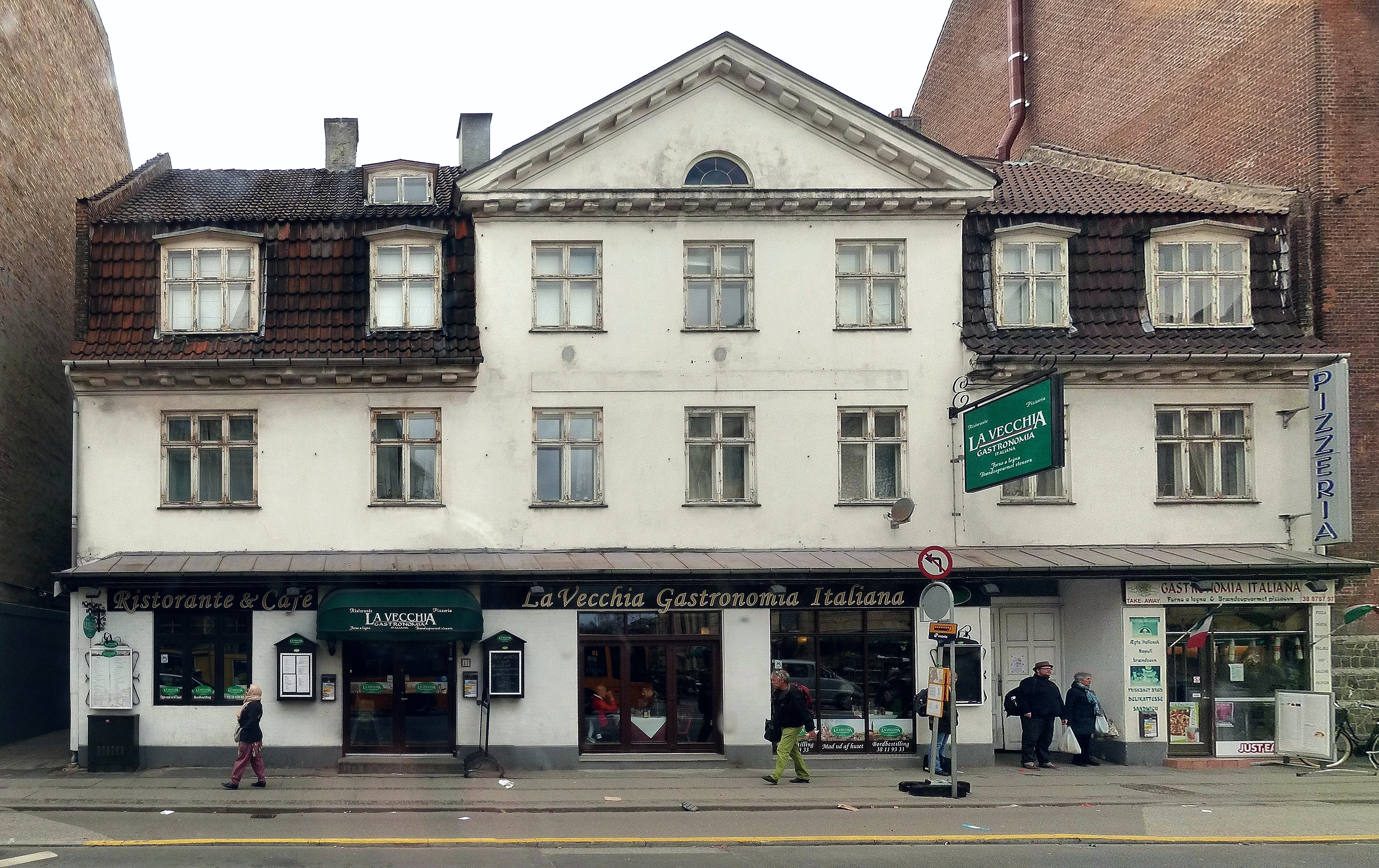
- Falkoner Allé
- Length: 1,170 m (3,840 ft)
- Location: Frederiksberg
- Nearest metro station: Frederiksberg
- Coordinates: 55°40′55.28″N 12°32′5.51″E

Falkoner Alle (lit. "Falconer Avenue") is one of the main streets of Frederiksberg in Copenhagen, Denmark. It runs from Frederiksberg Town Hall Square in the south to Ågade on the border with Nørrebro in the north, linking Allégade with Jagtvej. The street takes its name from the Royal Falconry which was located in the area. Remains of the buildings are still found behind the buildings at No. 112–120. Notable buildings on the street include the Frederiksberg Centret shopping center and the Falkoner Center hotel and conference centre.

== History ==
=== The king's falconry ===
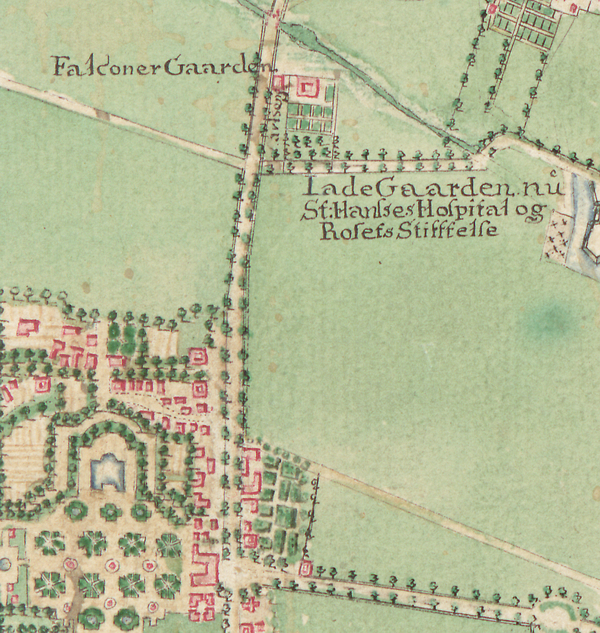
Galkonér Allé in a map detail from 1770.

The street was established in about 1670 as a driveway to Falkonergården, Christian V's new facility for stabling of gyrfalcons for falconry. The falcons, gyrfalcons brought home from Iceland and Greenland, were used as gifts for foreign rulers by the Danish kings on their journeys abroad. The road was originally gated at each end but it was opened to the public after Hømarken (literally "Hayfield"), an area to the north belonging to Ladegården, a farm under Copenhagen Castle, was auctioned off in lots to wealthy citizens from Copenhagen who built their country houses on the land. The Royal Falconry closed in 1810 and the last falcons were gifted to the Portuguese court.

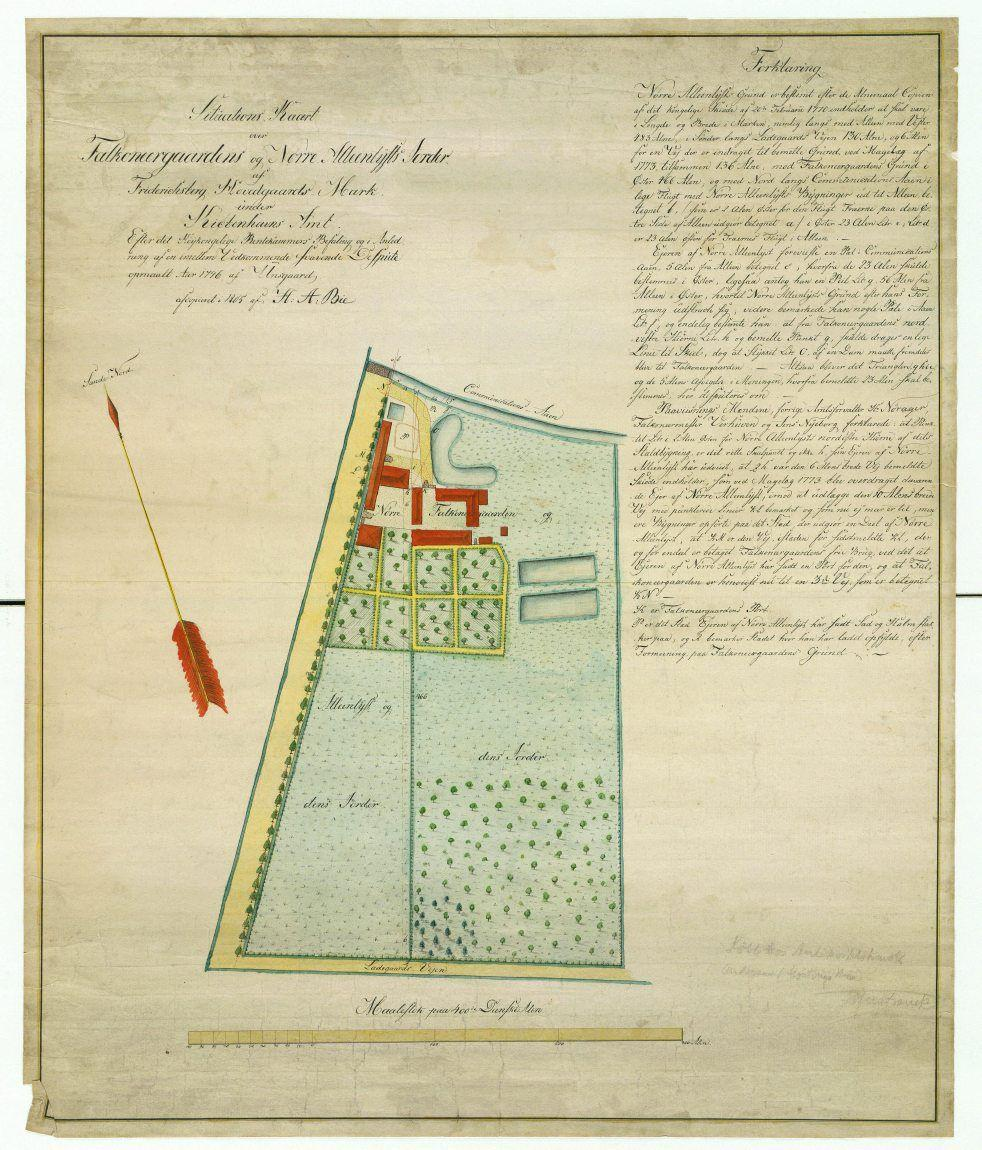
Map of Falkonergården and Nørre Alléenlyst and the land under these estates, c. 1805

The Falkonérgården property was acquired by Carl Adolph Feilberg. He initially used it as a country house but established a soap and wax candle factory at the site in 1842. The but were later torn down except for a single wing which is still seen in the alley between No. 112 and No. 120.

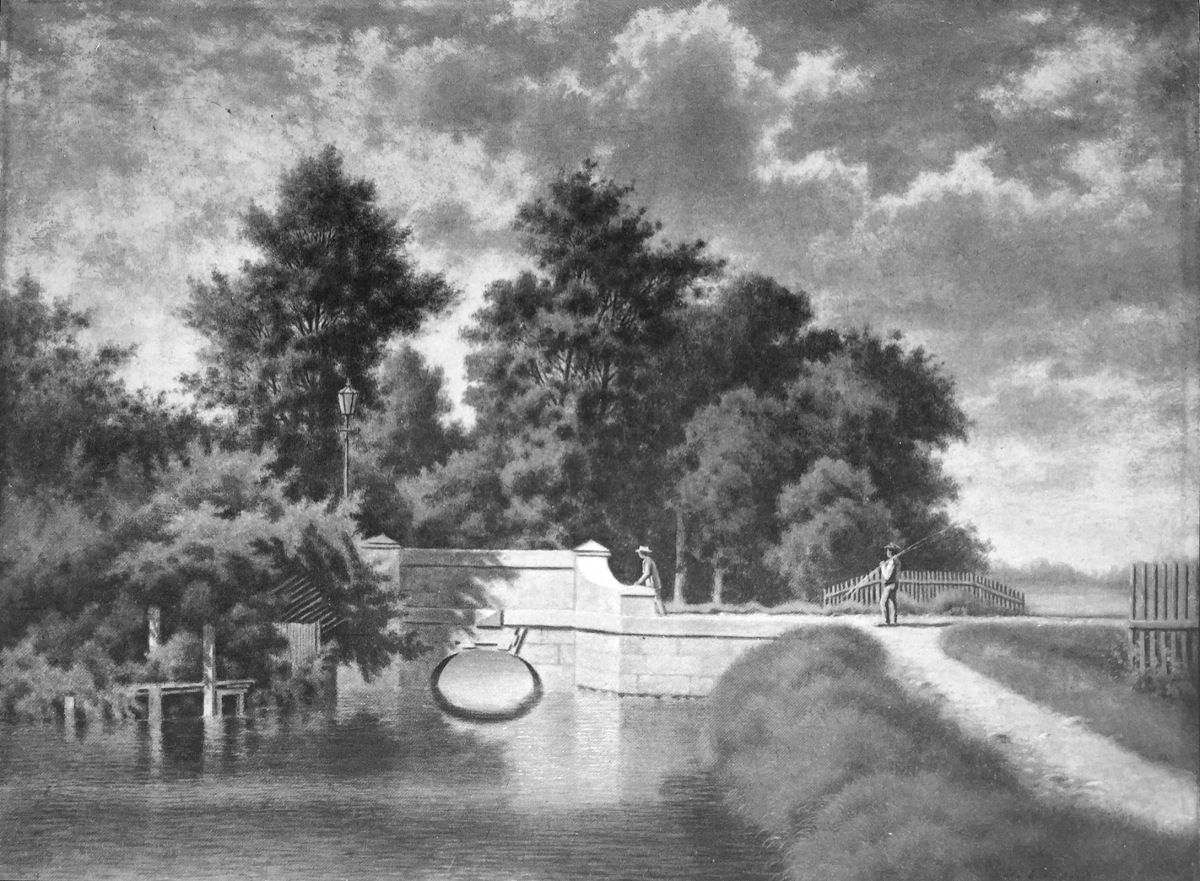
The bridge between Falkoner Allé and Jagtvej viewed from the east

The new country houses along the street included Mariendal, Sophienlyst and Landlyst. Sophienlyst was constructed in 1790 by brewer Herman Søderberg (1751–1800) who named it after his wife Johanne Sophie Kofoed (1770–1798). Ub 1803, it was acquired by Johan Frederik Wilhelm Schlegel (1765–1836) who renamed it Sindshvile. It was later owned by the politician Frederik Vilhelm Schytte.

=== Late 19th-century urbanization ===
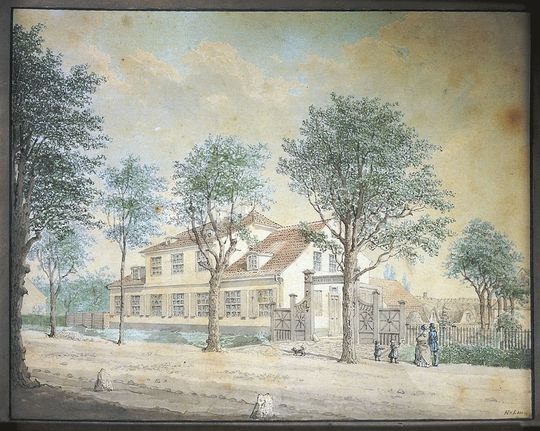
Falkoner Allé in about 1850, watercolour by H.G.F. Holm

The first houses along the tree-lined avenue were built around 1850, but until 1859 Falkoner Allé And Jagtvej marked the so-called Demarcation Line which enforced restrictions on construction of buildings outside Copenhagen's City Walls.

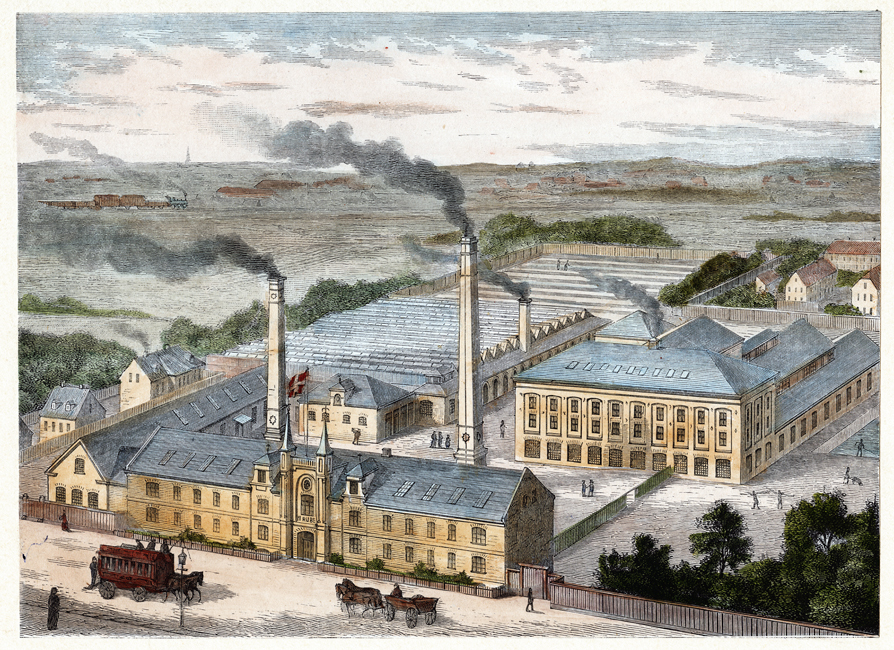
An illustration from Illustreret Tidende showing the Ruben Textile Factory in 1879

In around 1880, J. W. Hoffmeyer created the enew streets Sindshvilevej, Adilsvej, Roarsvej and Helgesvej.

The east side of the street was dominated by factories and small workshops: The Ruben Textile Factories opened in 1859 on the corner with Rolighedsvej, employing more than 500 workers by 1890. Frederiksberg Iron Foundry existed from 1872 to the mid-1950s. Further north, also on the east side between Rolighedsvej and Ladegården, was a beer garden and entertainment venue, founded in about 1850, which survived until 1907.

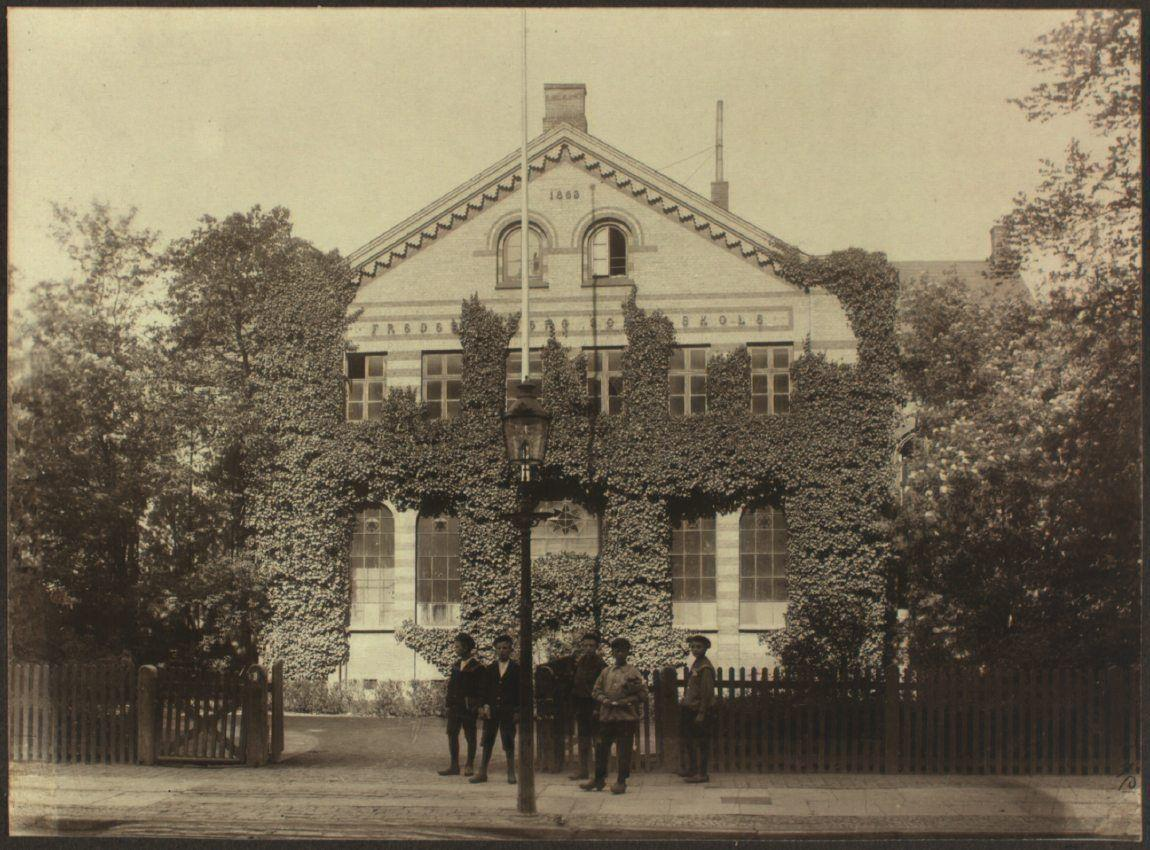
Frederiksberg Allé School, which opened in 1865

Frederiksberg's two first public schools were built in the southern end of the street on the west side. They were joined in 1886 by Frederiksberg's first town hall which later took over the buildings.

The first apartment buildings in the street were built around 1880. Many of the earliest buildings, typically just two storeys tall, were soon replaced by taller structures. By 1910, the street appeared fully developed.

=== 20th century changes ===
A fairly large number of the old buildings disappeared in the middle of the 20th century to make way for modern ones. The Ruben Textile Factory was demolished in 1938, while the old town hall and Frederiksberg Iron Foundry survived until the 1950s.

== Notable buildings and residents ==
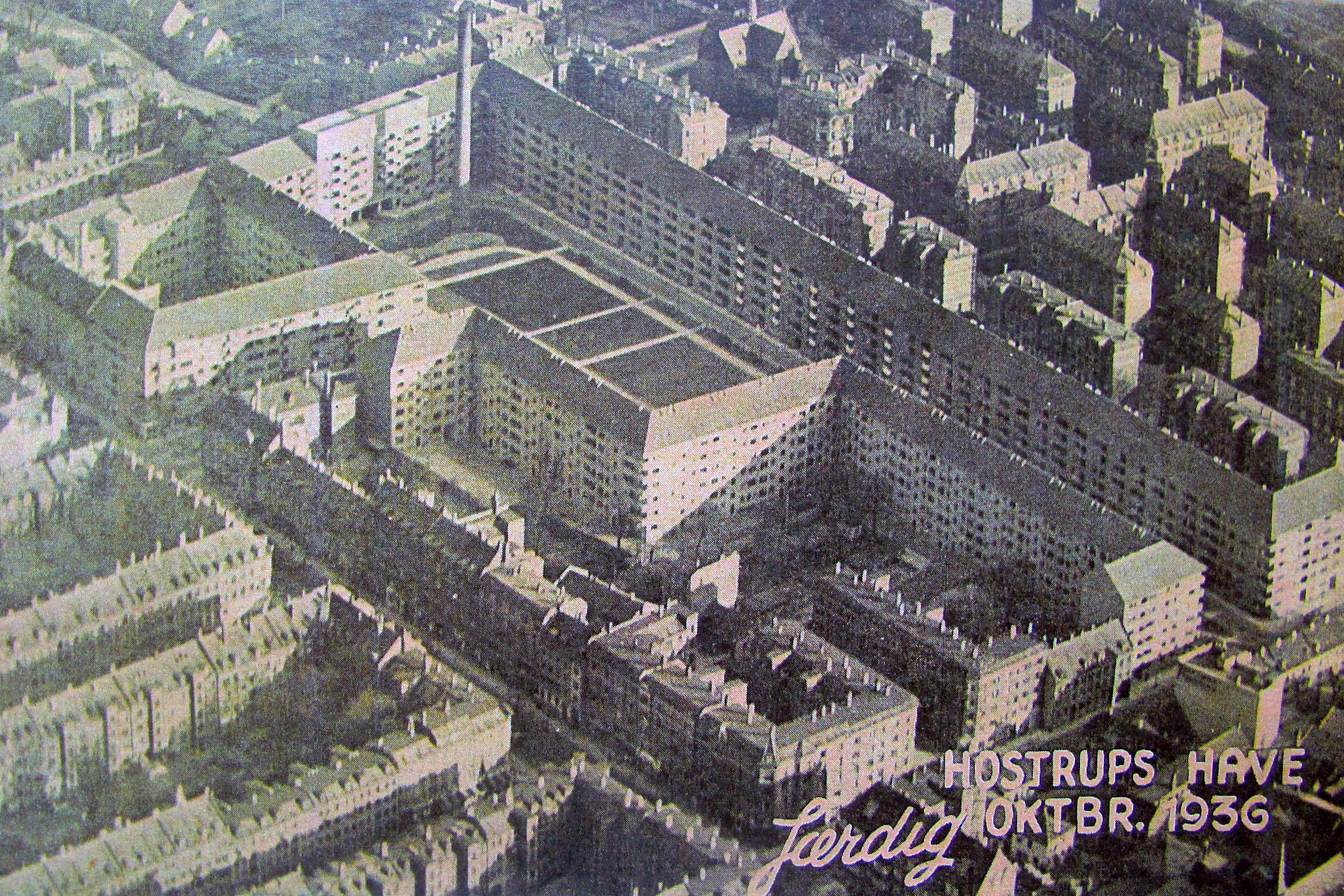
Hostrups Have anno 1936

Falkoner Center, a hotel and conference venue, has replaced Frederiksberg's old town hall on the corner with Howitzvej. It was completed in 1959 and modernized in 1987. Frederiksberg Gymnasium is located at Falkoner Plads ("Falkoner Square"), an urban space located to the rear of the centre. The Frederiksberg Centre, a shopping mall, is located at No. 21.

Hostrups Have, the Modernist residential complex from 1936 designed by Hans Dahlerup Berthelsen, enclosing a garden space, is located on the corner with Rolighedsvej.

Next to Hostrups Have stands Bernhard Ruben og Hustrus Stiftelse (No. 73), a charitable housing complex established by Bernhard Tuben in around 1903. The building was designed by Frederik L. Levy. It contained 30 dwellings for indigent working-class men and women.

== Public art, monuments and memorials ==
On Kejserinde Dagmars Plads (literally "Empress Dagmar's Square), the small space opposite Frederiksberg Centre, stands the sculpture Amor and Psyche by Pontus Kjerrmans and in 2013 a Russian society offered to donate a bust of Dagmar for the site.

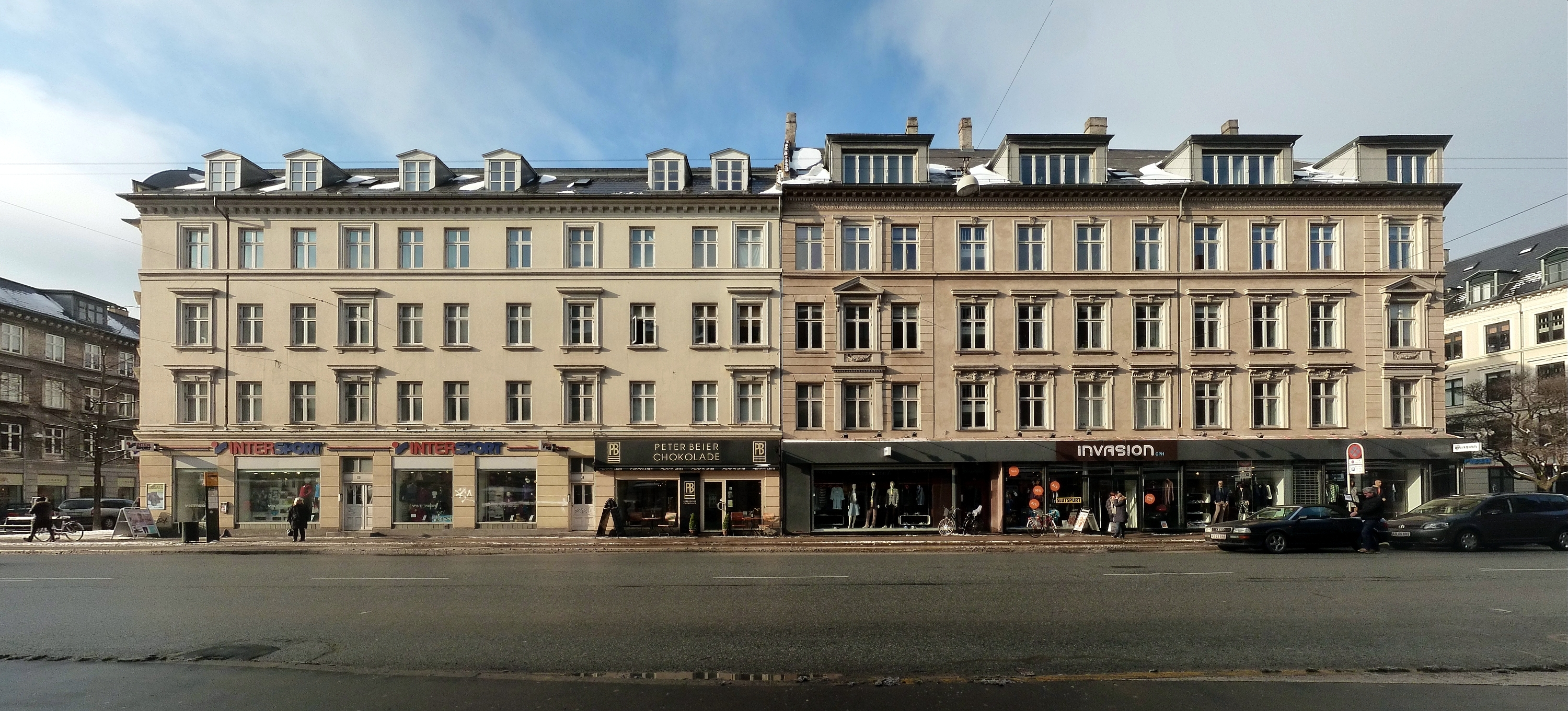
41–45 Falkoner Allé
