= Frederikssundsvej =

Street in Copenhagen, Denmark

- Interactive map of Frederikssundsvej
- Length: 5500
- Location: Copenhagen, Denmark
- Quarter: Bispebjerg and Brønshøk-Husum
- Postal code: 2400 København NV, 2700 Brønshøj
- Southeast end: Nørrebrogade
- Major junctions: Nordre Fasanvej, Frederiksborggade, Ring 2 (Copenhagen), Borups Allé-Hareskovvej
- Northwest end: Herlev Hovedgade

Other
- Known for: Lygtens Station, Bellahøj Houses

Frederikssundsvej is a major artery in the North-West, Brønshøj and Husum districts of Copenhagen, Denmark. It begins at Nørrebro Station as the direct continuation of Nørrebrogade and changes its name to Herlev Hovedgade and then Skovlunde Byvej, Ballerup Byvej and Måløv Byvej before reaching the town of Frederikssund.

== History ==
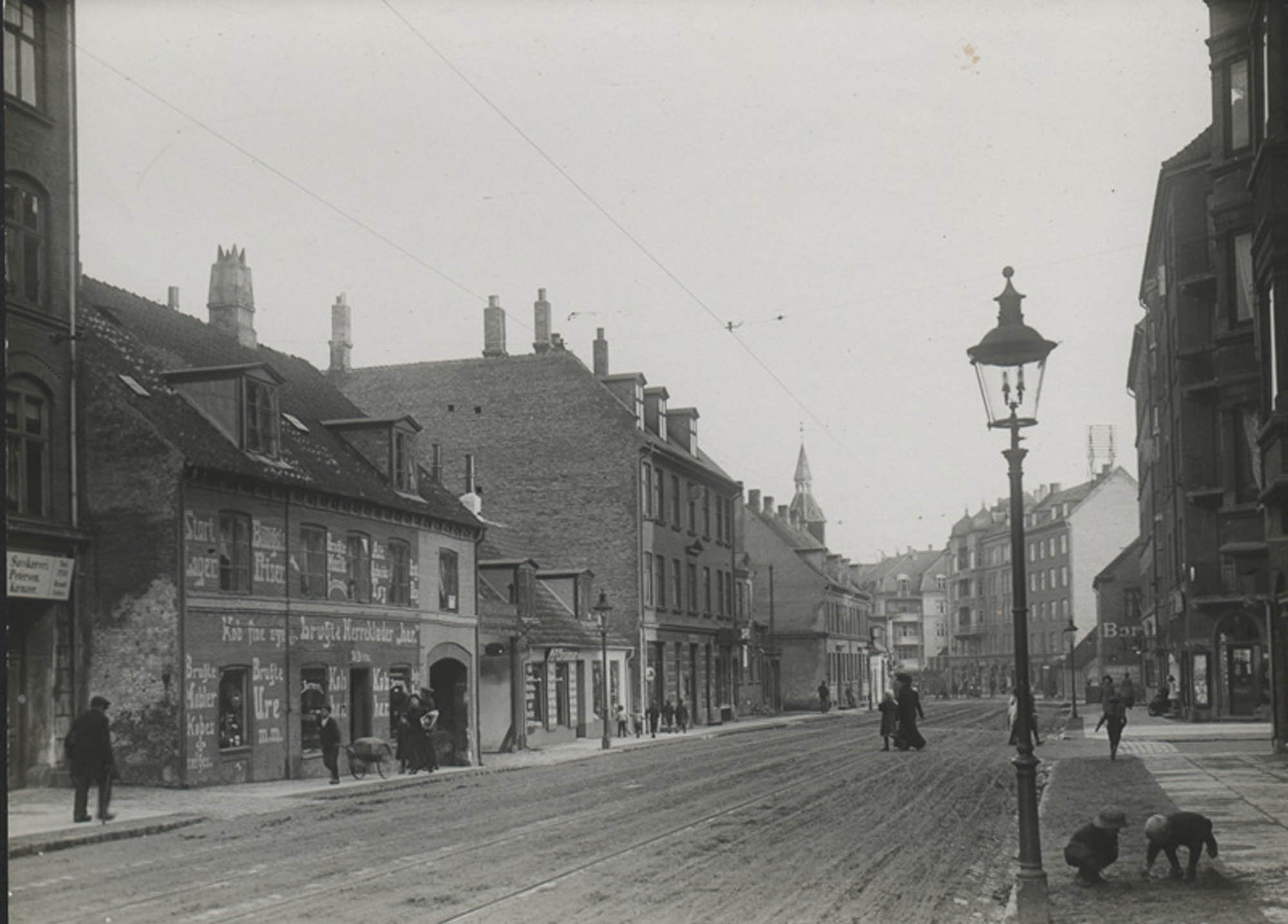
Frederikssundsvej, 1915

The street originates in the old road between Copenhagen and Frederikssund. It began at the Hyttebro, a bridge across the Lygte stream (Lygteåen) which then marked the boundary between Copenhagen and the civil parish of Brønshøj-Husum. Lygtekroen, a roadside inn frequented by travelers to and from Copenhagen, was located close to the bridge. The road passed the villages of Brønshøj, Herlev and Islev on the way to Frederikssund.

In 1901, Brønshøj-Husum was merged into Copenhagen. The Lygte stream was covered and the Lygte inn was demolished in 1904.

== Notable buildings ==
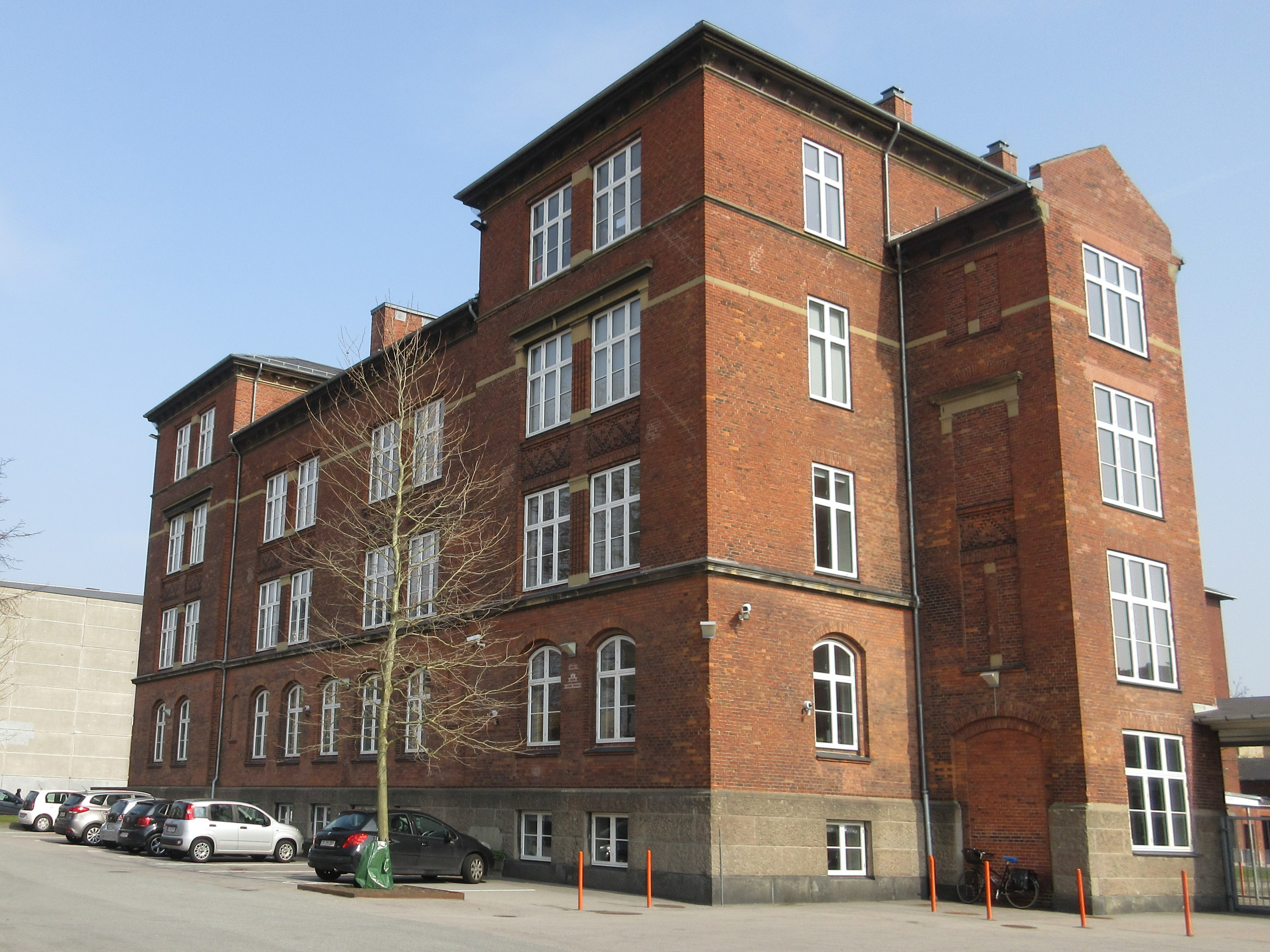
No. 77-79: The former Frederikssundsvej School

Capernaum Church (No. 45), a Church of Denmark parish church, is from 1895 and was designed by Valdemar Koch. Frederikssundsvej School (No. 77-79) closed in June 2008. The building is from 1904 and was designed by city architect Ludvig Fenger.

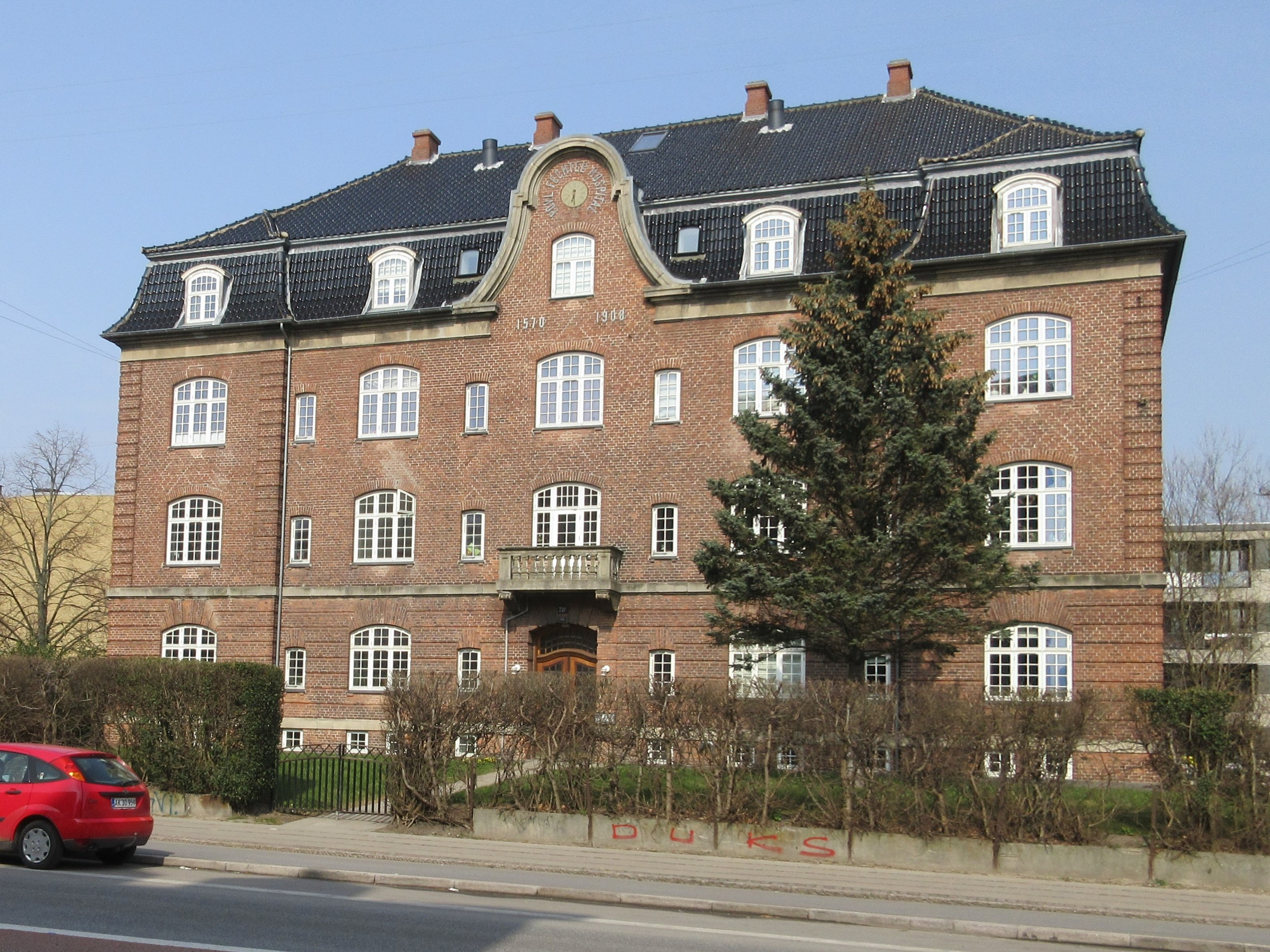
No. 78: Poul Fechtels Hospital

P. Ipsens Enke, a ceramics manufacturing company founded by Peter Ipsen in 1843 and later continued by his widow and son, was located at No. 78. The building at No. 78A, a former charity called Poul Fechtels Hospital, is from 1908. The charity was, however, founded as far back as 1460. It had until then been located at Møntergade.

The Hulgårds Plads housing estate is from 1944 to 1946 and was designed by city architect Hans Christian Hansen. The local fire station, Tornegårdens Brandstation, is located at No. 83B, It is from 1907 and was designed by Hans Wright.

== Public art ==
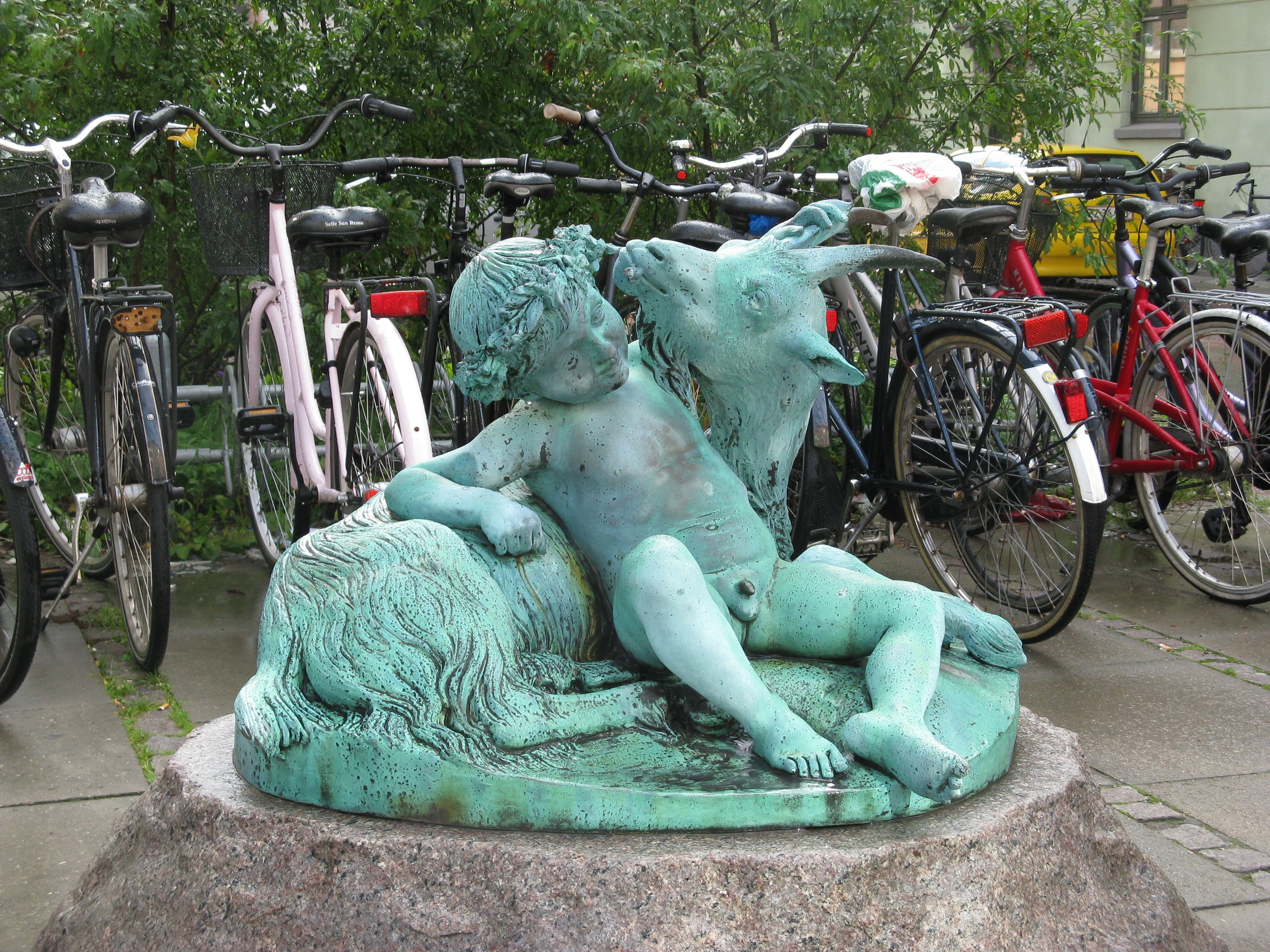
Otto Evens: Boy With Goat

A bronze cast of Otto Evens' 1854 sculpture Boy With Goat stands at the corner of Frederikssundsvej and Tranevej.

== Parks and public spaces ==
Brønshøj Plads and Husum Plads, the two central public spaces of Brønshøj and Husum, are both located off the street. A number of parks and other greenspaces are also situated along the street. These include Brønshøj Park, Bellahøj, Brønshøj Cemetery, Herlev Bypark and the former military rampart Vestvolden with its moat Fæstningskanalen.

== Notable people ==
- Hans Hedtoft (1947–50 and 1953–55) lived with his wife Ella and their three children on Frederikssundsvej at Hyrdevangen before purchasing a house at Fuglsang Allé 63 in Brønshøj.

== See also ==
- Rentemestervej
