= Hornbækhus =

Historic townhouse in Copenhagen, Denmark

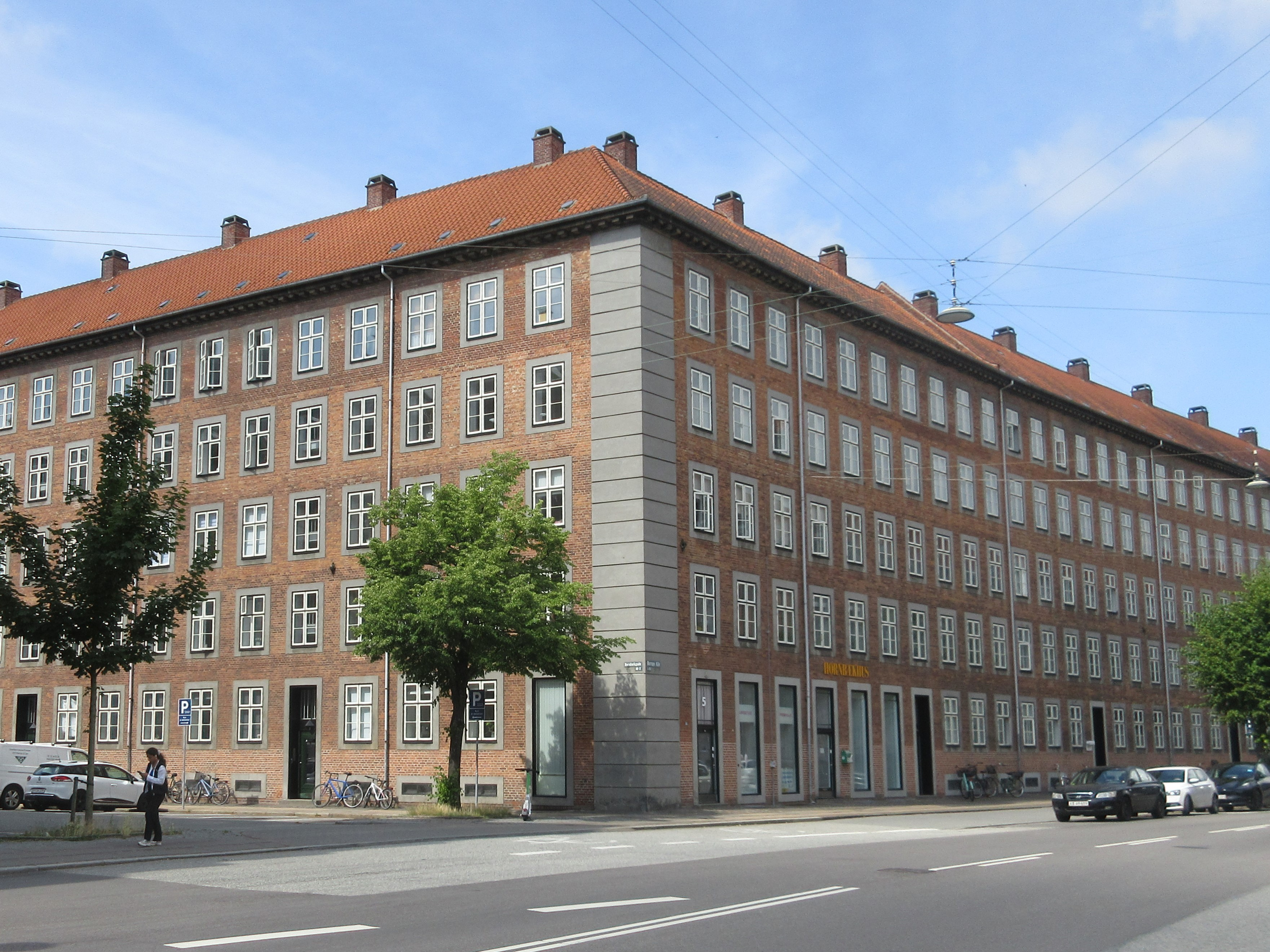
- Interactive map of the Hornbækhus area

General information
- Architectural style: Neoclassical
- Location: Copenhagen, Denmark
- Coordinates: 55°41′22.56″N 12°32′25.44″E
- Completed: 1923

Design and construction
- Architect: Kay Fisker

Hornbækhus is a Neoclassical apartment building situated between Borups Allé and Aagade in the Nørrebro district of Copenhagen, Denmark. Built in 1923 to designs by Kay Fisker, with a length of approximately 200 metres and a width of 80 metres, holding 290 apartments, it is considered one of the finest examples of the particularly large perimeter blocks, in Danish known as storkarréer (Grand Blocks" or the kilometerstilen (the kilometre style), which were constructed in the 1920s in an effort to combat the increasing housing shortage of the time. The central garden complex was designed by Gudmund Nyeland Brandt. The building was listed in the Danish registry of protected buildings and places in 1983.

== History ==
The construction of Borups Allé began in 1902. Many of the new streets in the area around the first part of Borups Allé were named after localities in North Zealand. The street names Hornbækgade (named for Hornbæk) and Skotterupgade (named for Skotterup) were both adopted in the 1910s. The city reserved large areas of land for public housing but development was initially slow due to a low demand for housing at the time. In 1908, Copenhagen had 11,000 empty apartments. A decade later, during the First World War the situation had dramatically changed with increasing housing shortage having become a concern. The first public housing association was established in 1915. In 1922, a government programme was launched to support the construction of housing. This paved the way for the construction of a lot of large housing estates in the periphery of Copenhagen. Hornbækhus was already planned in 1920. It was constructed in 1922–23. The building was designed by the young and still relatively inexperienced architect Kay Fisker. The central garden complex was designed by Gudmund Nyeland Brandt. The trend with constructing particularly large perimeter blocks to a monotonous design was adopted in an attempt to keep construction costs down. Povl Baumann's four residential blocks on Struenseegade was an example of the same approach. Fisker's Hornbækhus continued the approach but in an even larger scale.

== Architecture ==
Hornbækhus is constructed as an almost rectangular perimeter block between the streets Borups Allé, Åboulevard, Honrbækgade and Skottsrupgade. The facade on Aagade is slightly longer than the one on Borups Allé, resulting in a slightly acute-angled corner at Aagade-Hornbækgade and a slightly obtuse-angled corner Borups Allé-Hornbækgade. The building is constructed in red brick towards the street and yellow-flamed brick towards the yard. The four corners are accented with quoins. The windows and tall, narrow doorways areaccented withwide framing. Two two-bay gateways are located in Hornbækgade and Skotterupgade. The facades towards the street and yard are both finished by a modilioned cornice. The pitched roof is clad in red tile.

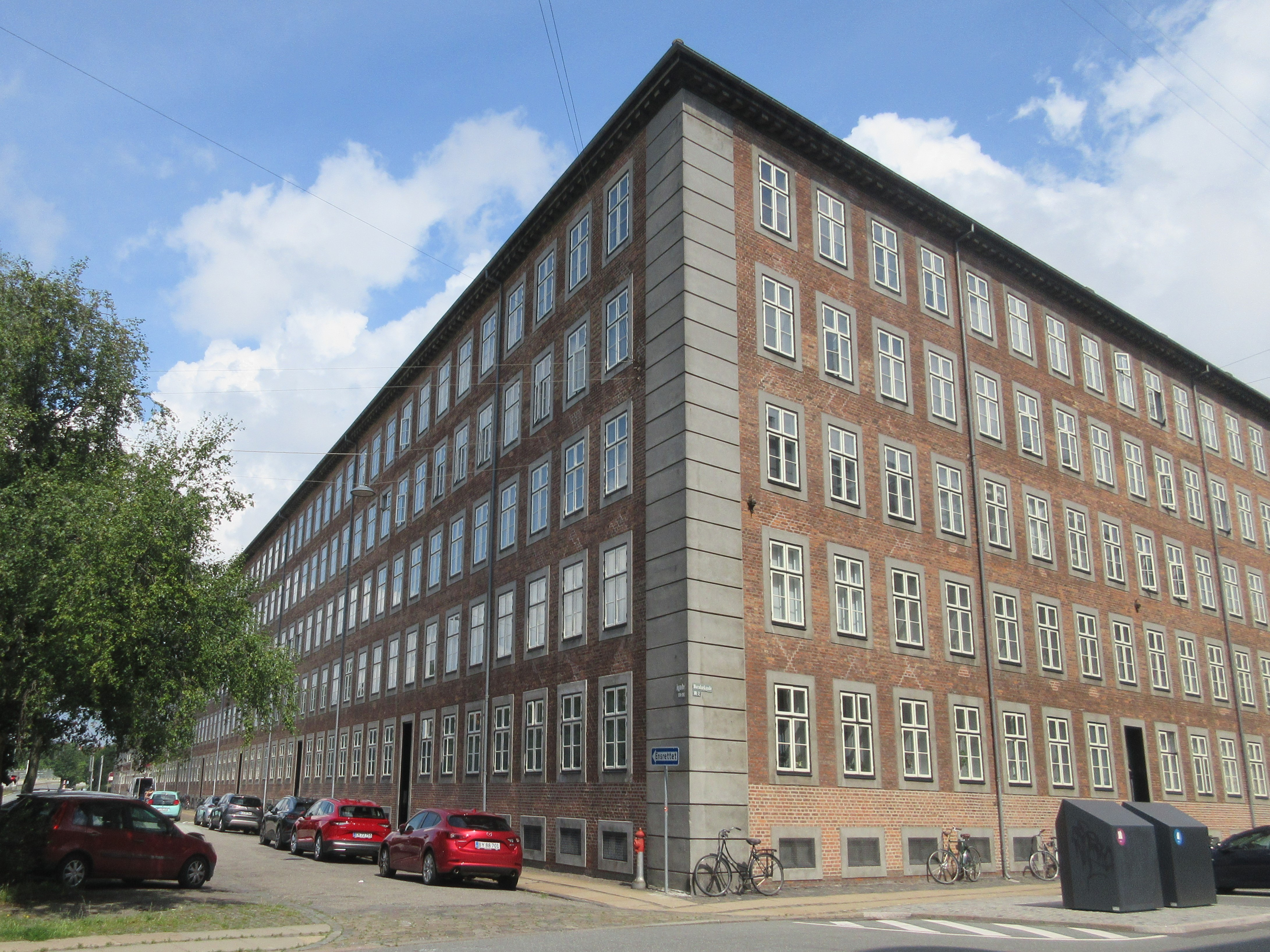
The slightly acute-angled corner of Aagade and Hornbækgade.

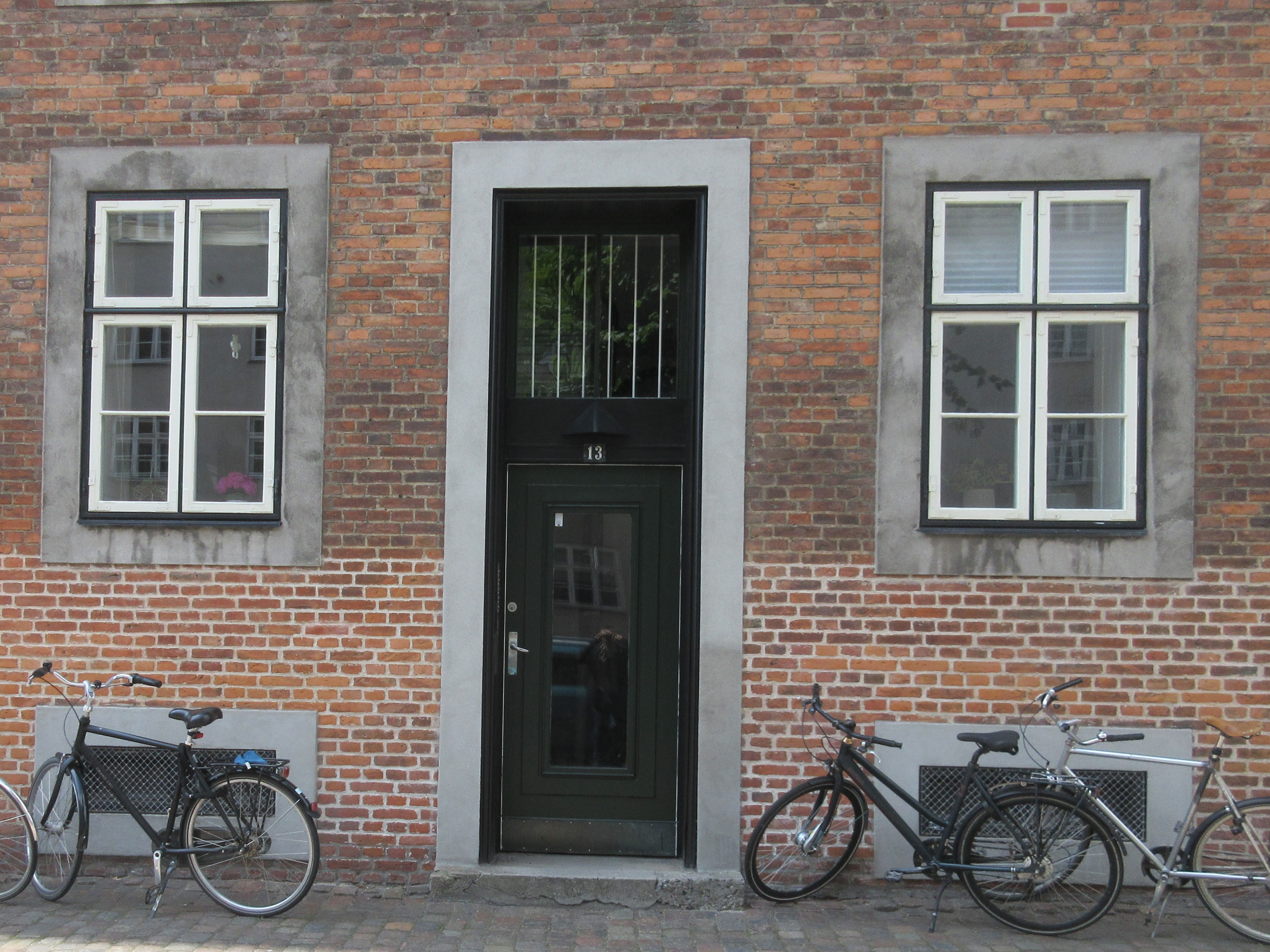
Doorway (Borups Allé No. 10), flanked by windows.
