= Sankt Gertruds Stræde 10 =

Building in Copenhagen, Denmark

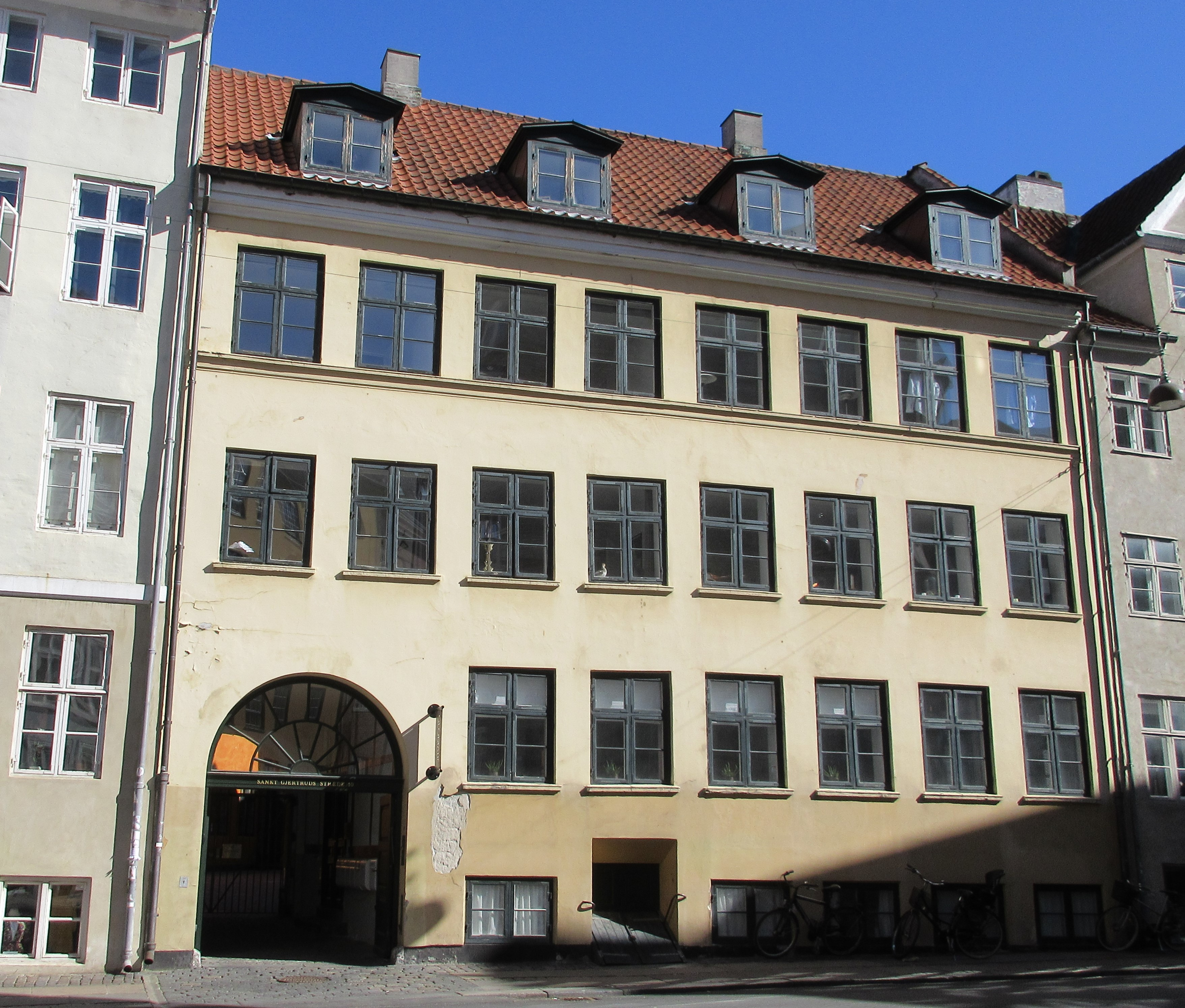
- Interactive map of the Sankt Gertruds Stræde 10 area

General information
- Location: Copenhagen, Denmark
- Coordinates: 55°41′0.71″N 12°34′27.62″E
- Completed: 18ty century
- Renovated: 1866

Sankt Gertruds Stræde 10 is a complex of 18th and early 19th-century building surrounding a cobbled courtyard in the Old Town of Copenhagen, Denmark. From at least the 1770s until 1860, it was operated as a dyer's workshop. The entire complex was listed in the Danish registry of protected buildings and places in 1950.

== History ==
=== Early history ===
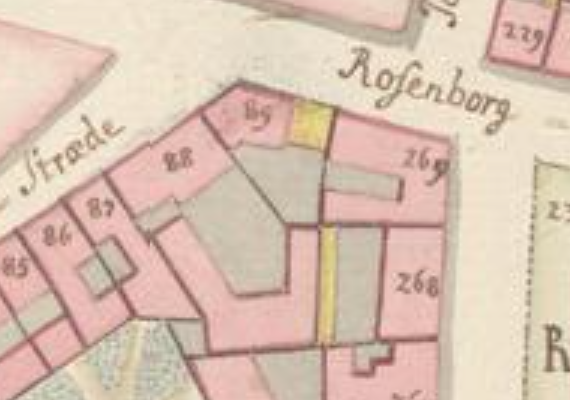
No. 88 seen on a detail from Gedde's map of Rosenborg Quarter, 1757,

The site was part of a larger property in the late 17th century. In 1689, it was listed as No. 93 in Rosenborg Quarter, owned by distiller Peder Christensen. This property was at some point divided into two separate properties, one in Sankt Gertruds Stræde and one in Åbenrå. The current building in Sankt Gertruds Stræde was constructed some time between 1730 and 1757.

The property in Sankt Gertruds Stræde was listed as No. 88 in 1756, owned by haulier Claus Lydersen. The property on Åbenrå was listed as No. 268 in 1756, owned by tanner Magnus Andersen.

=== Hornbech's dyeing plant ===
In the 1770s, the property was acquired by dyer and calico printer Peter (Peder) Hornbech. He resided in the building fronting the street and ran his business from the buildings in the yard. His property was moderately damaged in the explosion of the gunpowder magazine in Rosenkrantz Bastion on 31 March 1779. The damages were assessed at 53 rigsdaler.

The unmarried Peter Hornbech was, at the time of the 1787 census, living there with his employee Johan Melchior Woge and caretaker Friderich Mortensen. Another household consisted of calico printer Aage Johnesen Møller, his second wife Inger Niels Datter and two sons from his first marriage (aged 14 and four). A third household consisted of concierge of Tutein's Calico Factory, Søren Nielsen Giørup, his wife Eva Maria, and their lodger Johan Conrad Loell (a mason). The fourth household consisted of the widowed female plasterer Henrich Gether Gierlach and her two daughters (aged ten and twelve). The last household consisted of stockfish vendor Johannes Andersen, his wife Birthe Anders Datter and their two children (aged four and six).

The property was listed as No. 211 in the new cadastre of 1806. It was still owned by Peter Hornbech at the time.

=== Lind family ===
From at least the mid-1820s, the property was owned by dyer Knud Christian Lind. Lind's wife Sophie Ballum was the sister of Hans Christian Ørsted's wife. Their eldest son Niels Christian Lind joined his father's firm and was himself licensed as a dyer in 1838. His brother P.E. Lind (1814–1903) studied theology and would become Bishop of Aalborg. Their brother Theodor Lind (born 1823) became a bookseller and publisher.

As of 1840, it was at home to a total of 25 people. Lind lived on the ground floor with his wife Sophie Ballum, their three children (aged 11–19), his sister Mette Johanne Lind, three workers at the plant, a caretaker and a maid. Niels Christian Lind resided on the first floor with his wife Elise Bülow, his son Valdemar, his mother-in-law Marie Bülow and a maid. The 62-year-old widow Ingeborg Kristine Tøxen and her maid Dorothea also lived there with them. Master tailor Carl Budde and labourer Ane Cathrine Elken resided with their respective wives on the second floor. Anders Bentsen, a tavern owner, resided in the basement with his wife Ane Margrete Larsen and their daughter Ane Bentsen.

Niels Christian Lind bought his father's property and firm in 1846. He was a co-founder and board member of Opretter Kjøbenhavns Laanebank. In 1854, he became a member of the Copenhagen City Council. He also took over Peter Hansen's seat in Folketinget but lost it again the following year. In 1860, he had to give up his estate and emigrated to New York City.

=== Later history ===
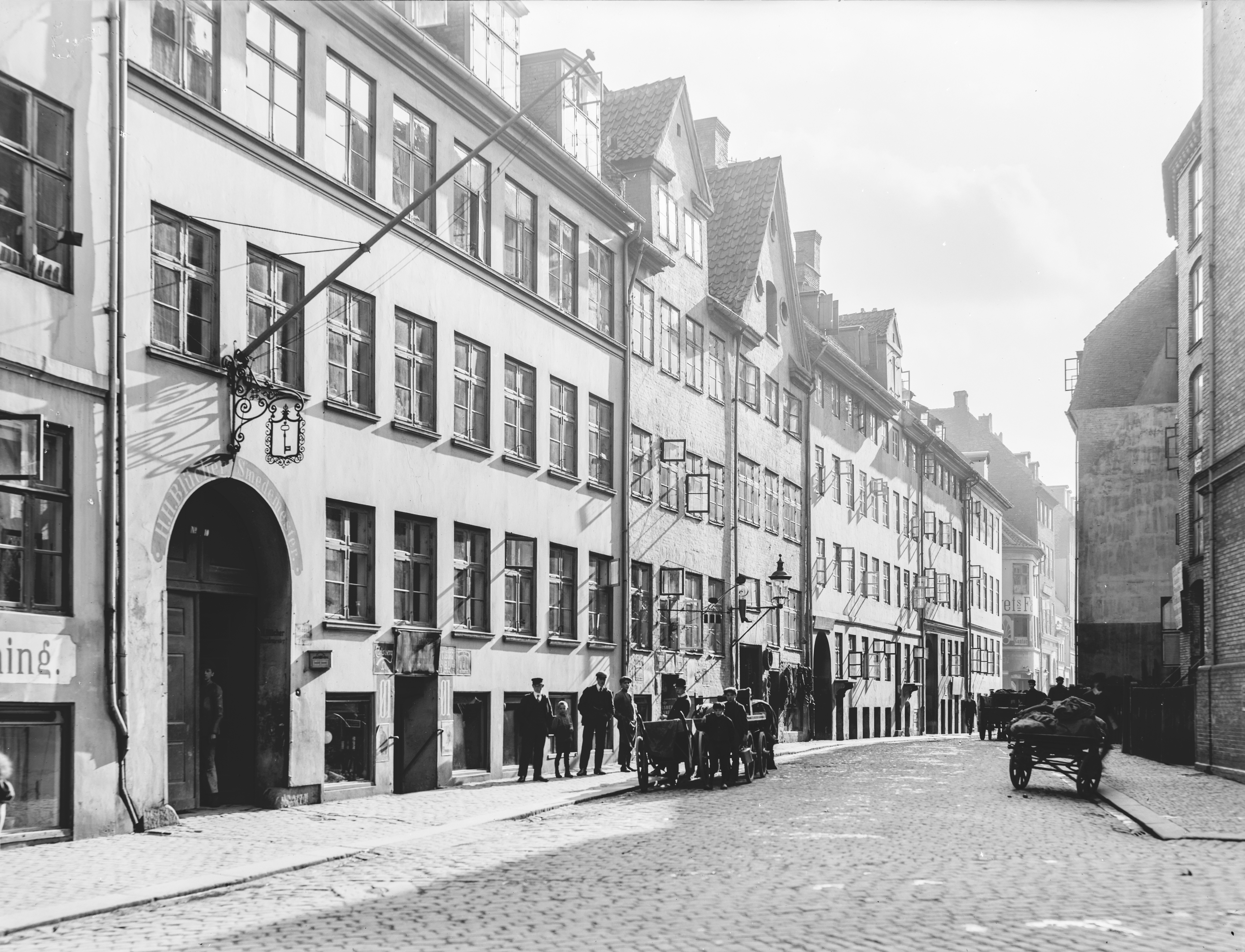
H. H. Blicher's building photographed by Johannes Hauerslev in c. 1905.

The rear wing was expanded by one storey in 1862 by the new owner and the building towards the street was expanded by one storey in 1866.

From 1894, the property was home to master smith H. H. Blücher's (1851–1930) smithing and plumbing business. The founder's son H. C. Blücher (born 1883) was made a partner in the firm, which from then on traded as H. H. Blücher & Søn. In 1938, it relocated to new premises at Rentemestervej 78.

== Architecture ==
Sankt Gertruds Stræde is a four-winged complex of buildings dating from the 18th and 19th centuries. The eight-bay-long building towards the street was constructed with two storeys over a walk-out basement but increased by one storey in 1866. The plastered, yellow-painted facade features a sill course below the windows on the second floor. The gate in the two bays furthest to the left is topped by a fanlight. The basement entrance is located in the fourth bay from the left. The pitched roof is clad with red tile. It features four dormer windows towards the street and the roof ridge is pierced by two chimneys.

All the facades facing the courtyard are rendered in a warm orange colour with green-painted doors and windows. A seven-bay-long, two-storey side wing extends from the rear side of the building along the south side of a cobbled courtyard. The building dates from the same time as the main wing. The main entrance is topped by a transom window. The four-bay rear wing dates from before 1757 but was heightened with one storey before 1862. The facade is crowned by a pointed wall dormer. The five-bay northern side wing was constructed for Knud Christian Lind in 1926. The facade of the two-storey building is crowned by a gable dormer with cornice returns.

== Today ==
The property is owned by Sankt Gertruds Stræde 10 A/S.

== Gallery ==
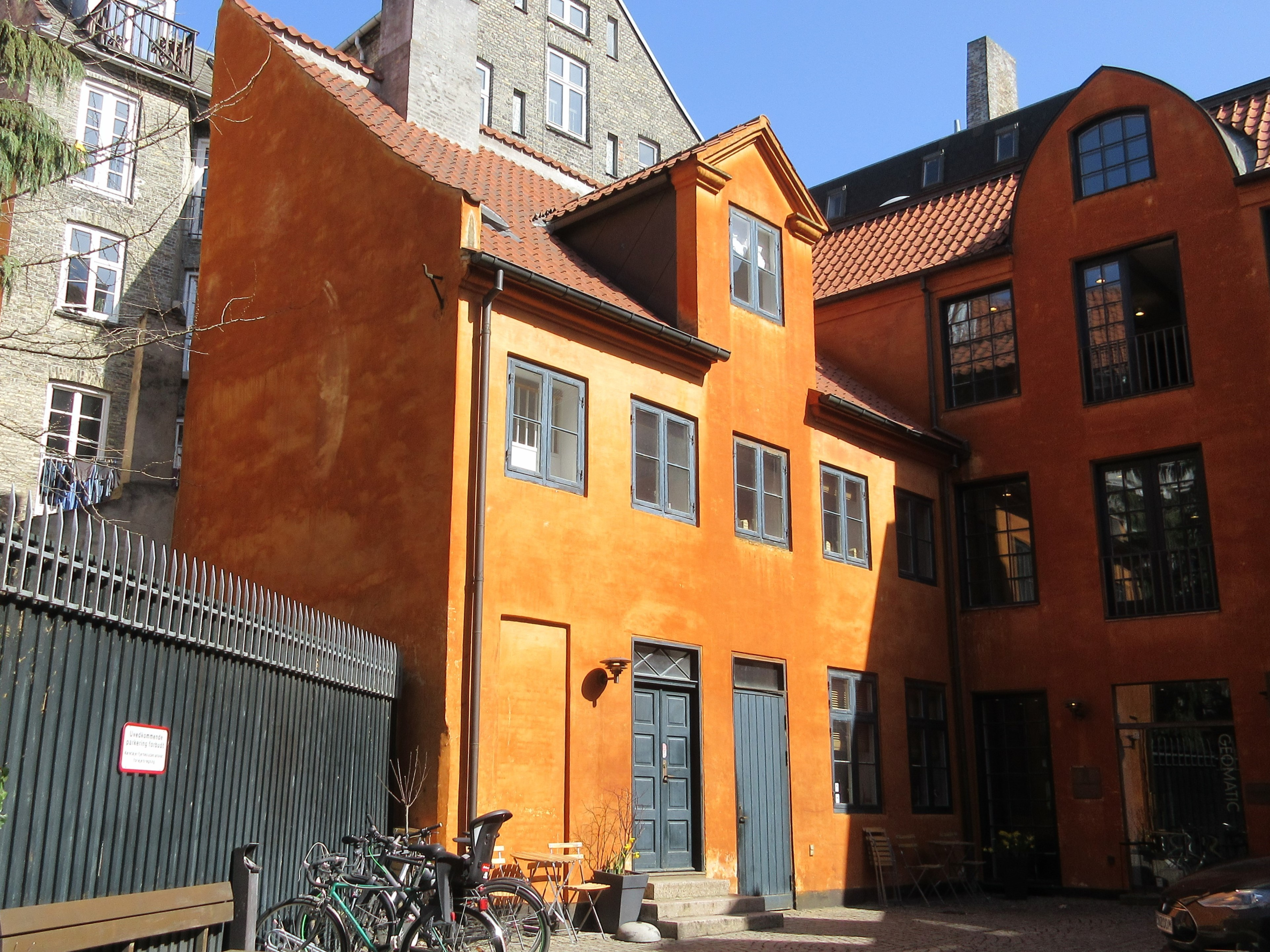
The five-bay northern side wing from 1826.

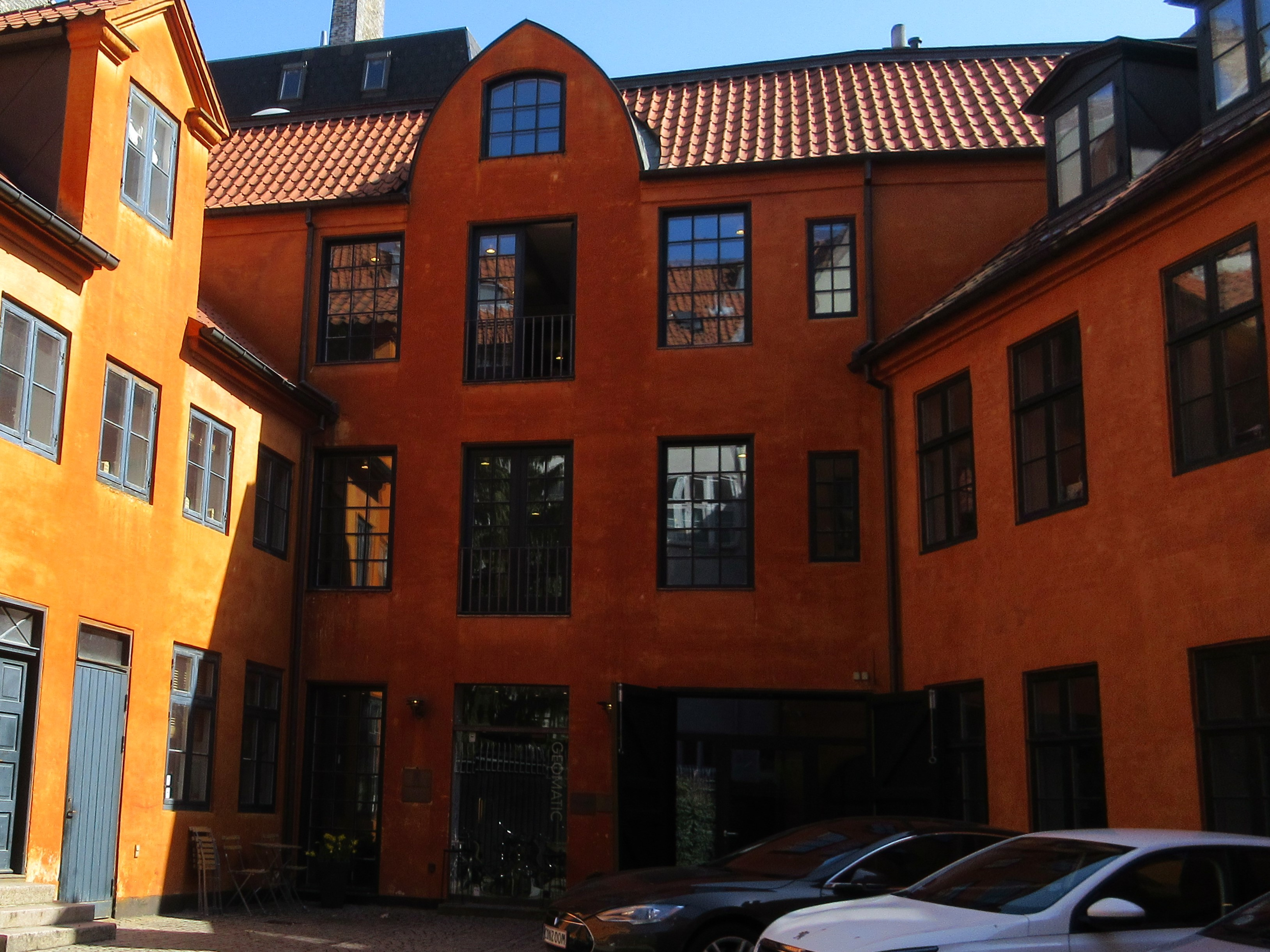
Rear wing.

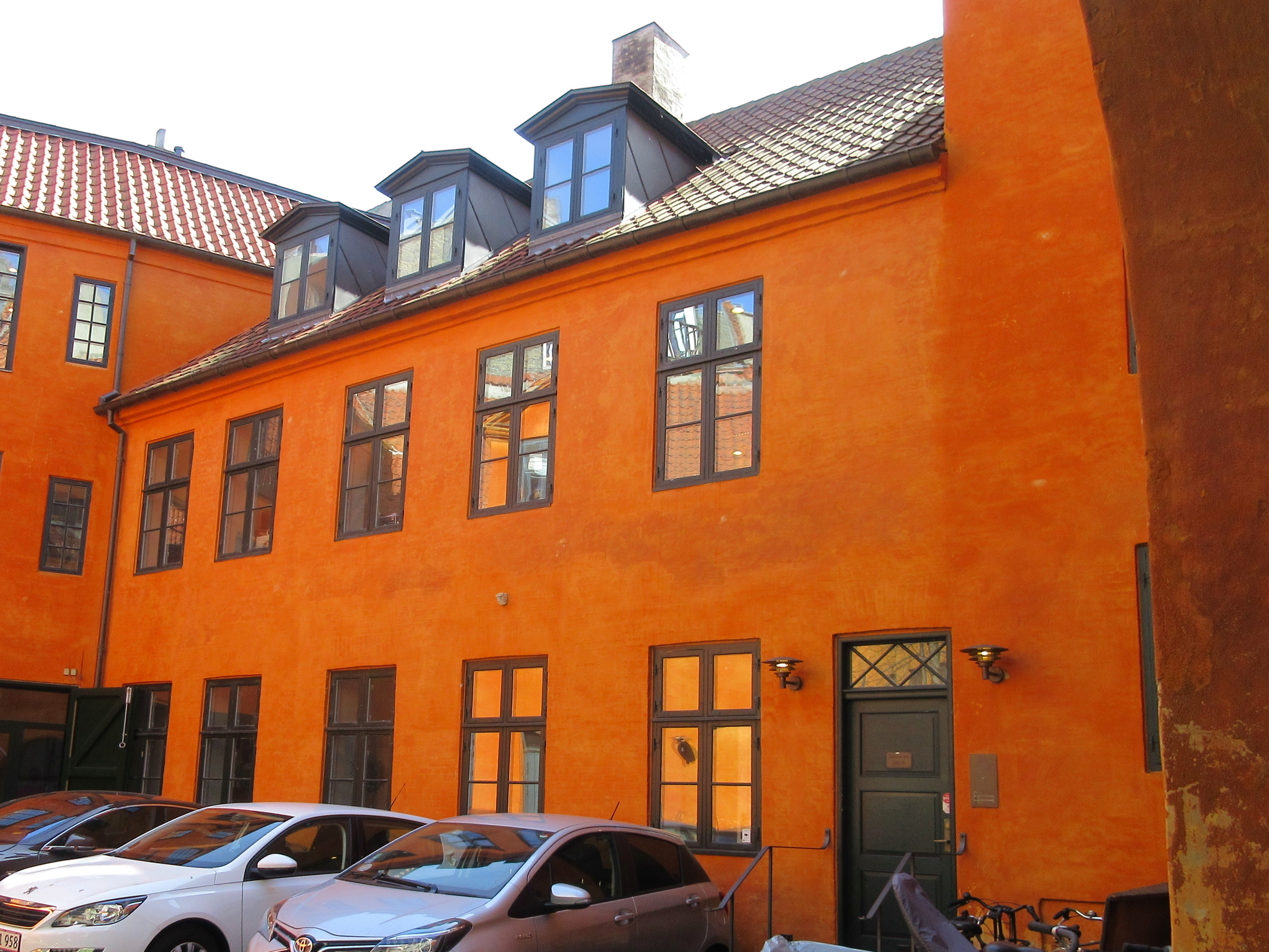
The seven-bay southern side wing.

== See also ==
- Holmblad House
