= Poul Fechtels Hospital =

Charity in Copenhagen, Denmark

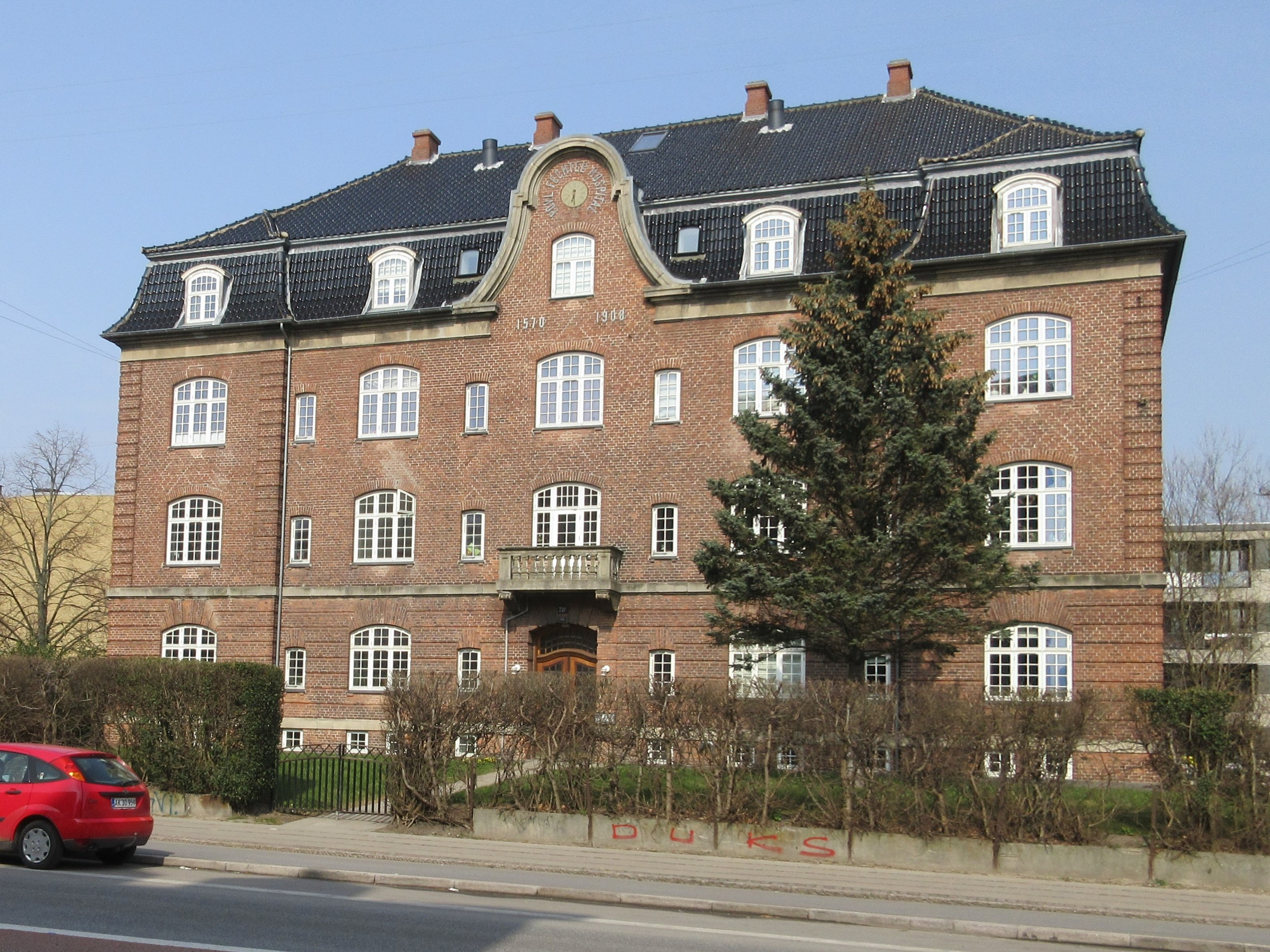
No. 78: Poul Fechtels Hospital

Poul Fechtels Hospital, originally also known as hamborgerske sjæleboder, was a charity in Copenhagen, Denmark. It was originally located at Møntergade 28 but relocated to a new building at Frederikssundsvej 67A in 1908.

== History ==
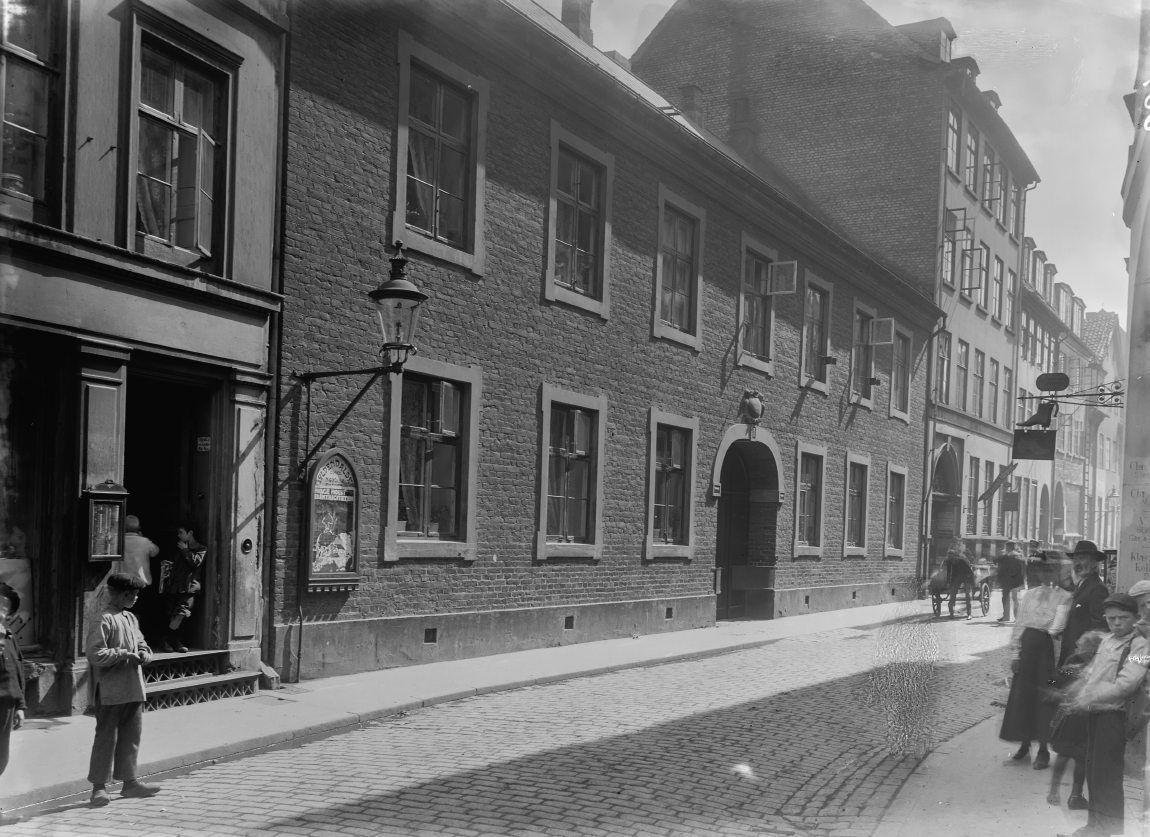
The building from 1732

Poul Fechtel had served as Royal Mint Master for Christian III from 1536 to 1565.

In 1570, Fechtel created a charity with 3,000 eigsdaler in capital with the aim of providing accommodation for indigent citizens. A row of small houses were constructed on a lot in Møntergade which had been granted to the project by Frederick II . The houses were variously referred to as Poul Fechtels Boder", "Mønterboderne" eller "Hamborgerboderne".

The houses were destroyed along with the rest of the street in the Copenhagen Fire of 1728 but a new building was constructed in 1732. Poul Fechtels Hospital moved to a new building on Frederikssundsvej in 1908 and its old buildings were demolished the following year when the street Christian IX2 Gade was created.

== See also ==
- Abel Cathrines Stiftelse
