= Brønshøjparken =

Park in Copenhagen Municipality, Denmark

Coordinates: 55°42′24″N 12°30′31″E

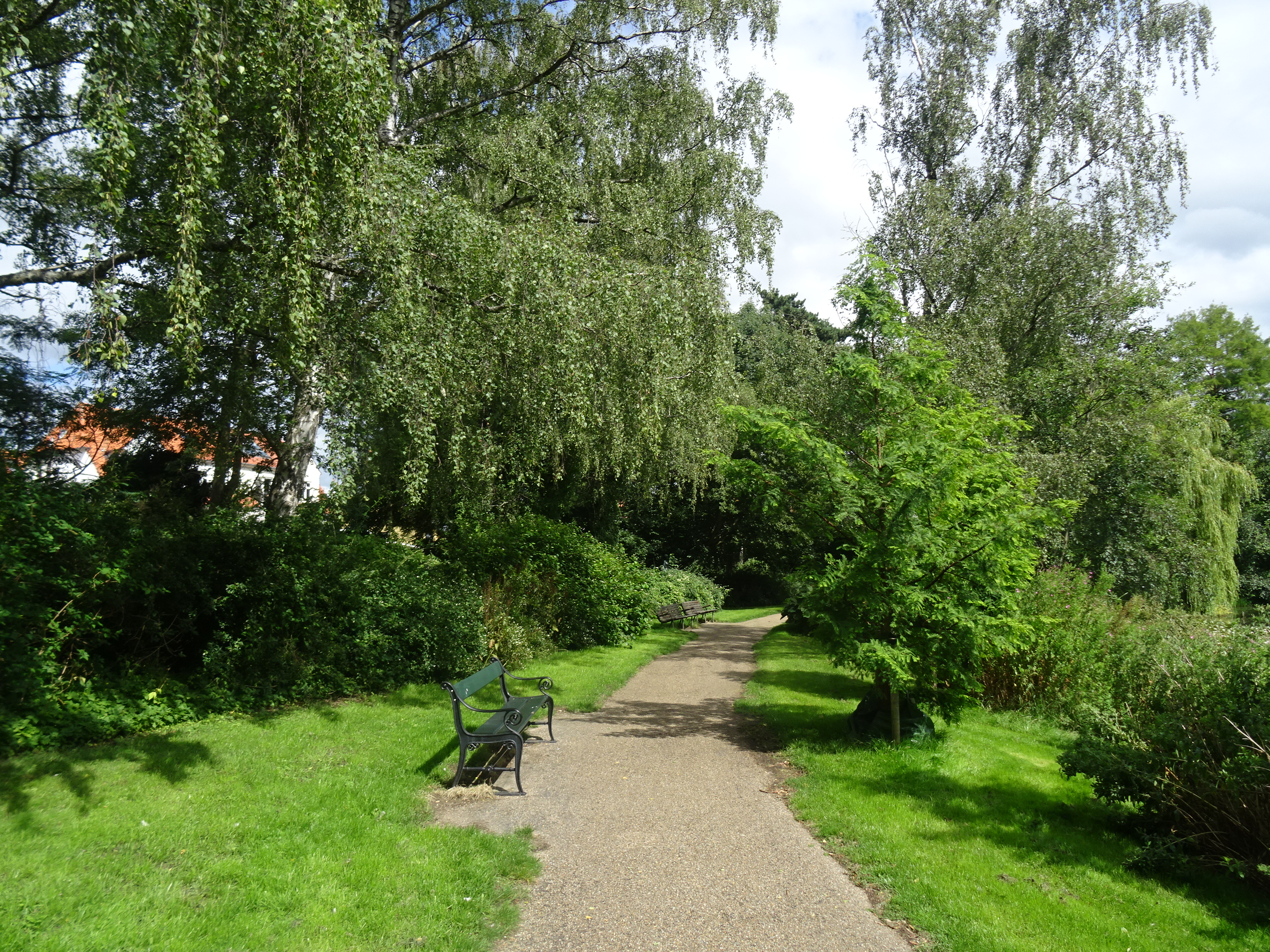
Path in Brønshøjparken.

Brønshøjparken is a public park in the Brønshøj district of Copenhagen, Denmark. It is situated on the north side of Frederikssundsvej, just east of the original village and west of the intersection with Borups Allé.

== History ==
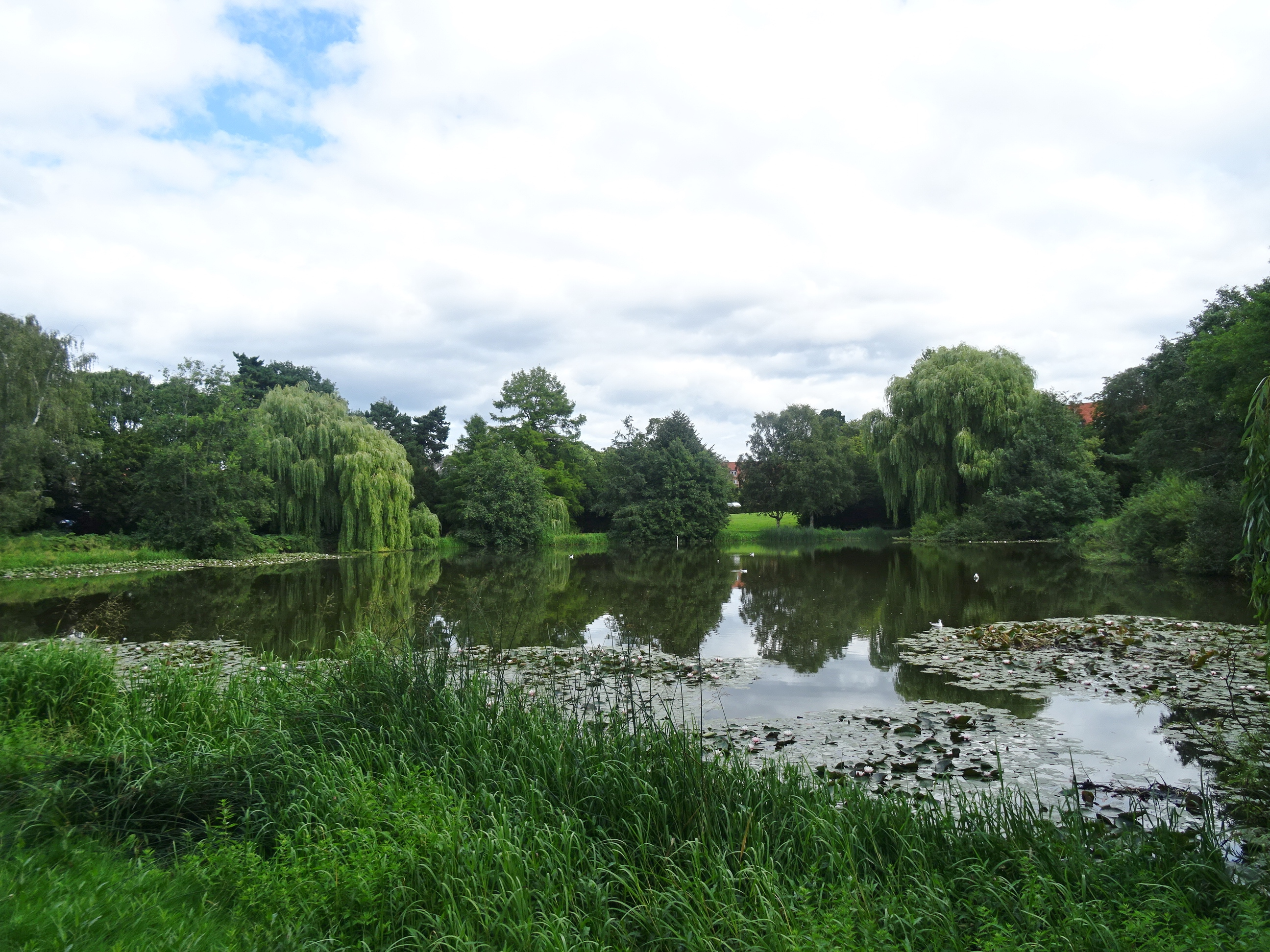
The lake Louisehullet.

The park is located in a natural depression where a ditch led water from Degnemosen to the south to Utterslev Mose to the north. Most of the depression has now been filled and the water now runs in a pipe.

A Washhouse was located at the site in the 1920s. The park was created in the 1930s. It was protected in 1966.

== Description ==
The hilly park surrounds a 6700 square metre lake, Louisehullet. Facilities include a playground and sports fields. A development plan for the park is due in 2015.

== Sculpture ==
A cast of Svend Lindhart's statue Mother with children from 1940 is located in the park.
