= Borups Allé =

Street in Copenhagen, Denmark

Coordinates: 55.6940°N 12.5318°E

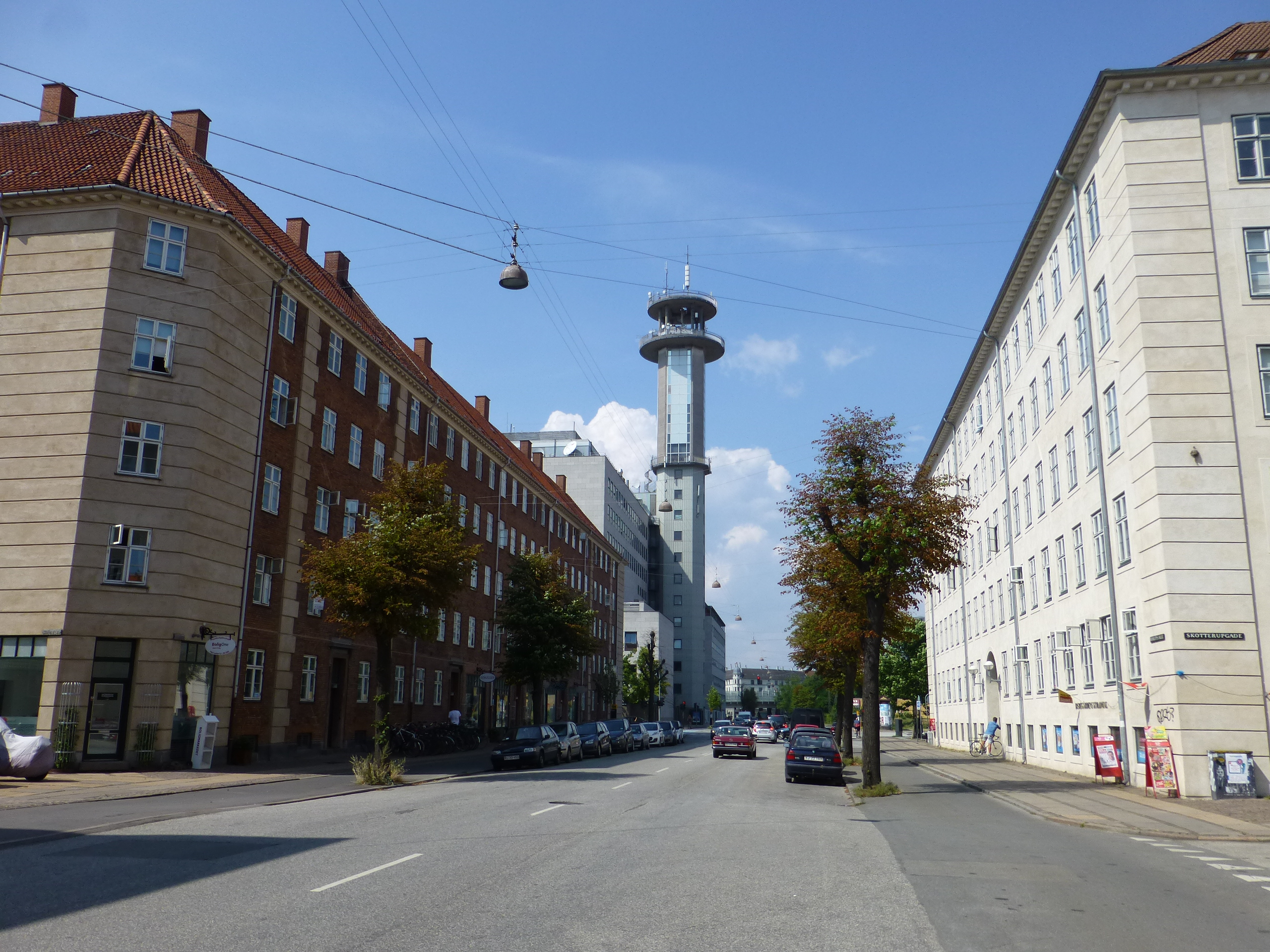
Borups Allé with the Telephone House's tower visible in the background

Borups Allé is a major artery in the northwestern part of inner Copenhagen, Denmark. The 3.2 km long street runs from Jagtvej at Nuuks Plads in the southeast to Bellahøj in the northwest. Just before Hulgårdsvej, part of Ring 2, Borups Allé is joined by Bispeengbuen, an elevated road section that connects it to Åboulevard-Ågade and H. C. Andersens Boulevard in the city centre. The rest of Borups Allé is the first leg of the National Road 16, part of the Danish national road network. It continues as a six-lane road to Frederikssundsvej where it becomes Hareskovvej and later the Hillerød Motorway at Utterslev Mose.

== Location ==
Borups Allé is the direct continuation of Rantzausgade. The initial part of the street passes below the elevated Bispeengbuen viaduct and Ringbanen S-train line. The former is located on the border between Copenhagen's Nørrebro district and Frederiksberg Municipality. Borups Allé No. 105–143 and 102–156 are located in Frederiksberg. The street then passes through Nordvest on its way to Bellahøj in Brønshøj where it turns into Hareskovvej after Frederikssundsvej and shortly thereafter the Hillerød Motorway at Utterslev Mose.

== History ==
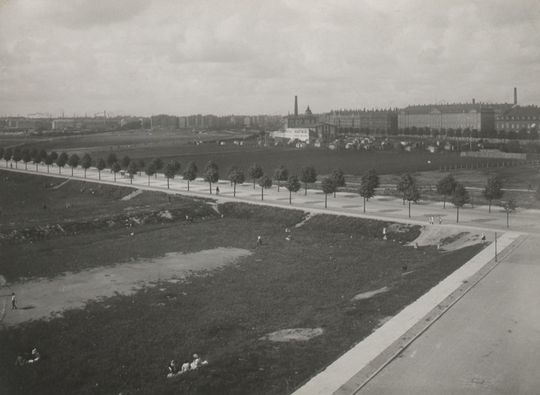
Borups Allé shortly after its establishment as viewed from the corner of Hornbækgade and Agade. Hørsholmgade is seen in the background to the right

Construction of the road began in 1902. It received its current name following the Conservative politician Ludvig Christian Borup's unexpected death on 18 January 1903, just one week after he had participated in the inauguration of the new Copenhagen City Hall. He had served as Mayor of Finances (Finansborgmester) since 1884. The new street name was officially adopted by Copenhagen City Council on 21 December 1903 and by Frederiksberg Municipal Council on 14 December 1903.

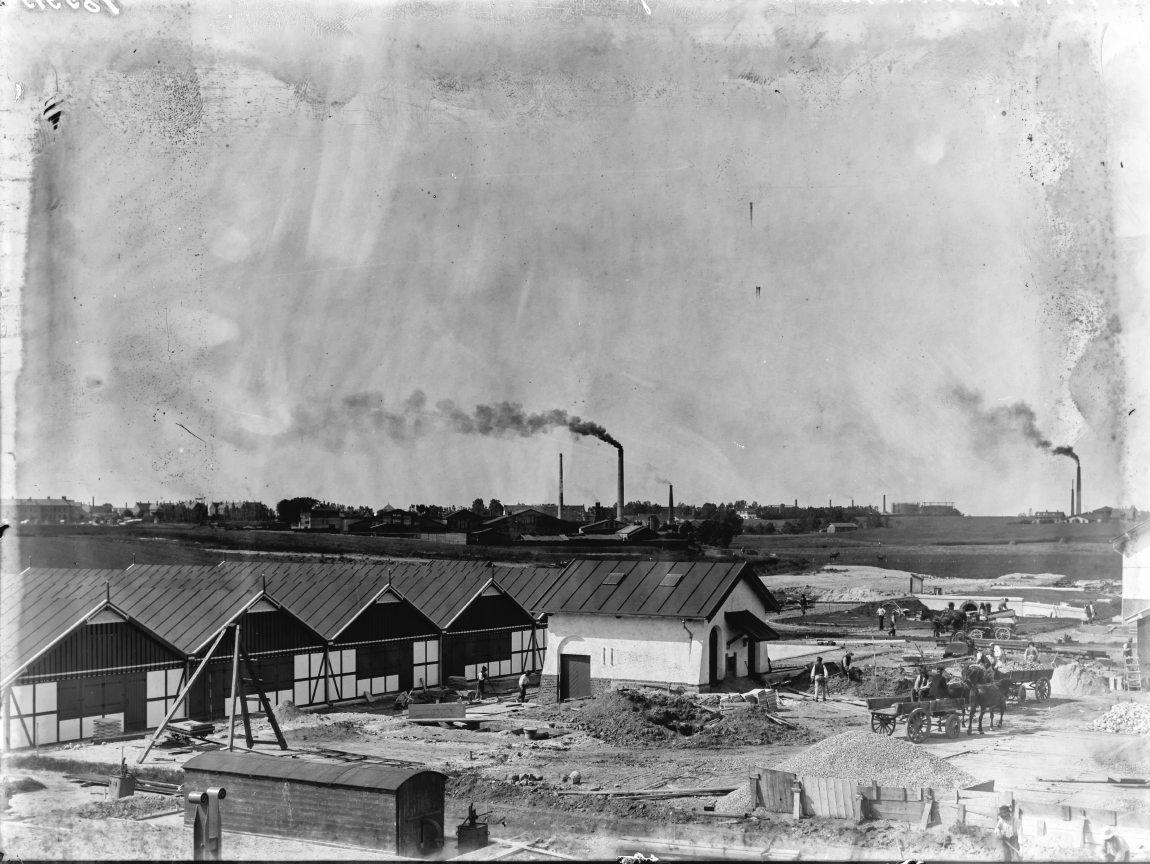
Vanløse Waterworks photographed by Frederik Riise, c. 1903

Borups Allé was initially a tree-lined avenue that passed through fairly rural surroundings. It crossed the small Ladegårdsåen River on a bridge. Brønshøj, which also comprised present-day Bispebjerg district, had only recently been merged into Copenhagen. The city reserved large areas of land for public housing but development was initially slow due to a low demand for housing at the time. In 1908, Copenhagen had 11,000 empty apartments.

In the early 1920s te situation had dramatically changed with increasing housing shortage and many large residential projects were built over the following decades. The street was widened in the 1960s to accommodate the pressure from car traffic. Bispeengbuen was constructed between 1970 and 1972.

== Notable buildings and residents ==
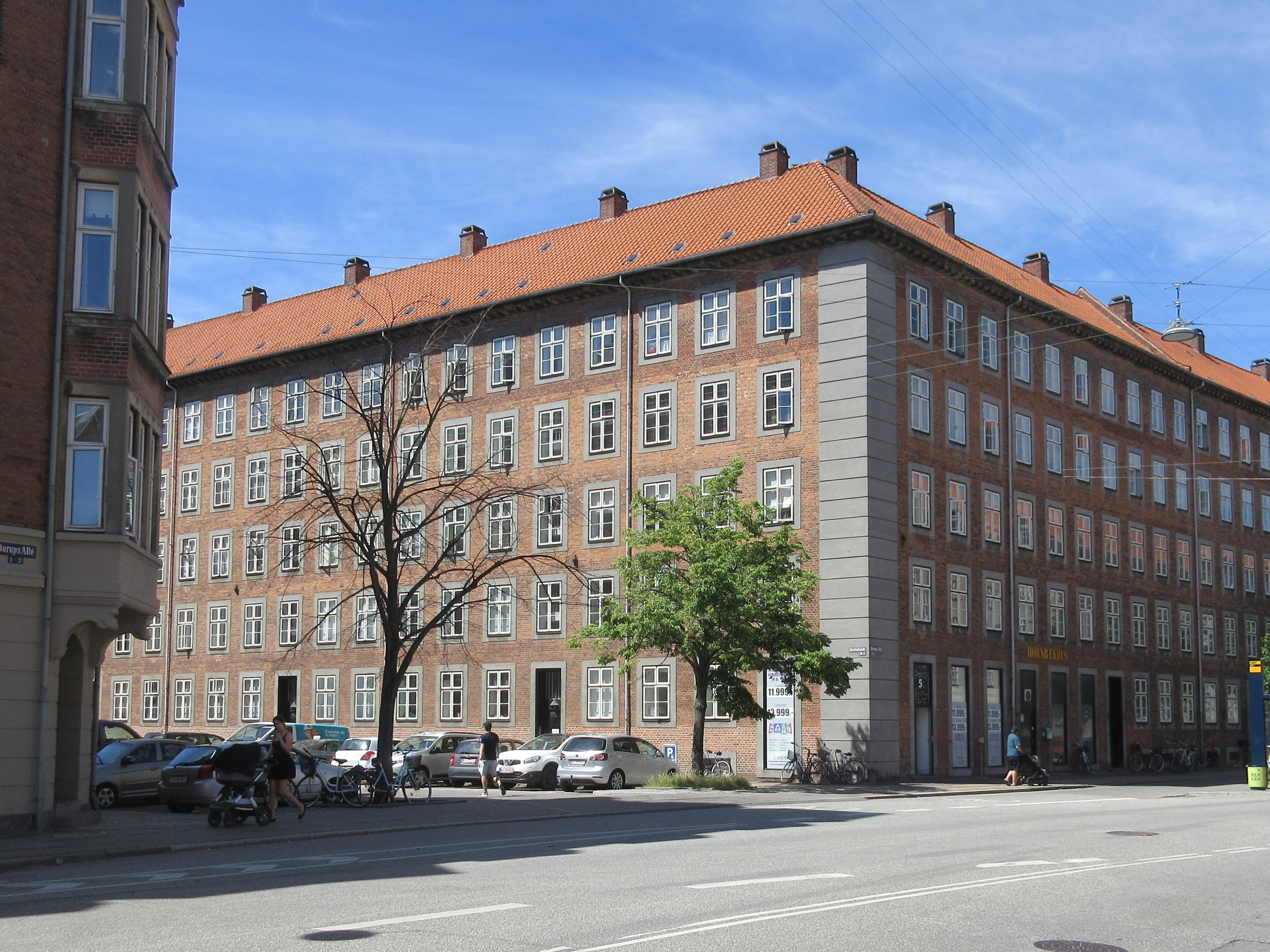
Hornbækhus

Kay Fisker's Neoclassical Hornbækhus from 1923 is one of the finest examples of the large residential perimeter blocks that were built in Copenhagen in the 1920s. It is 200 metres long and 80 metres wide and contains 290 apartments. The building occupies the block bounded by Borups Allé (No. 5–23), Hornbækgade (No. 2-10), Skotterupgade No. 13–19) and Ågade (No. 116–134). It surrounds a green space designed by Gudmund Nyeland Brandt.

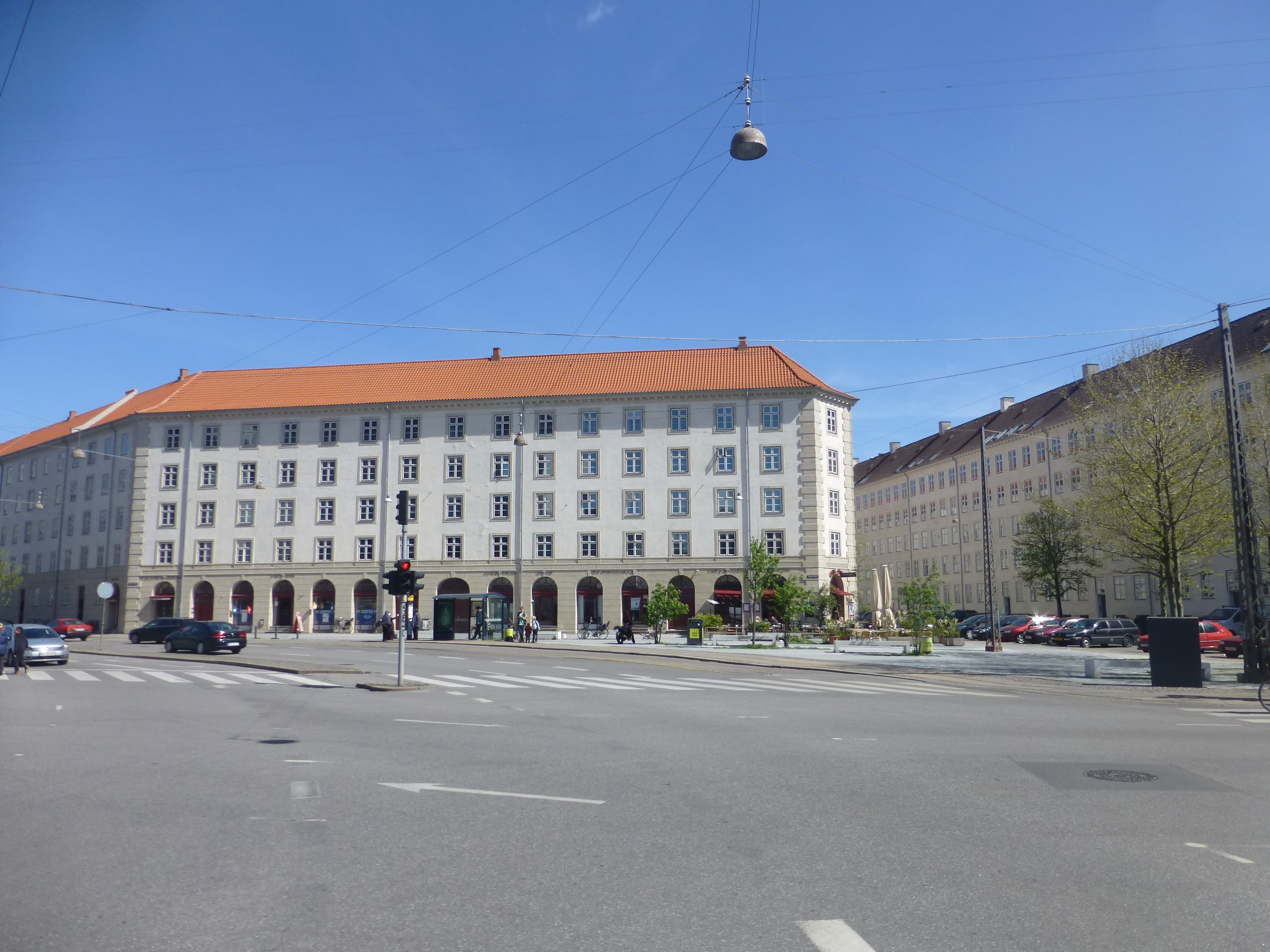
Borups Plads

Borups Plads (Borup's Square) is another Neoclassical apartment block, fronting a small public space on the corner with Lundtoftegade. It was designed by Alf Cock-Clausen for the city and completed in 1924.

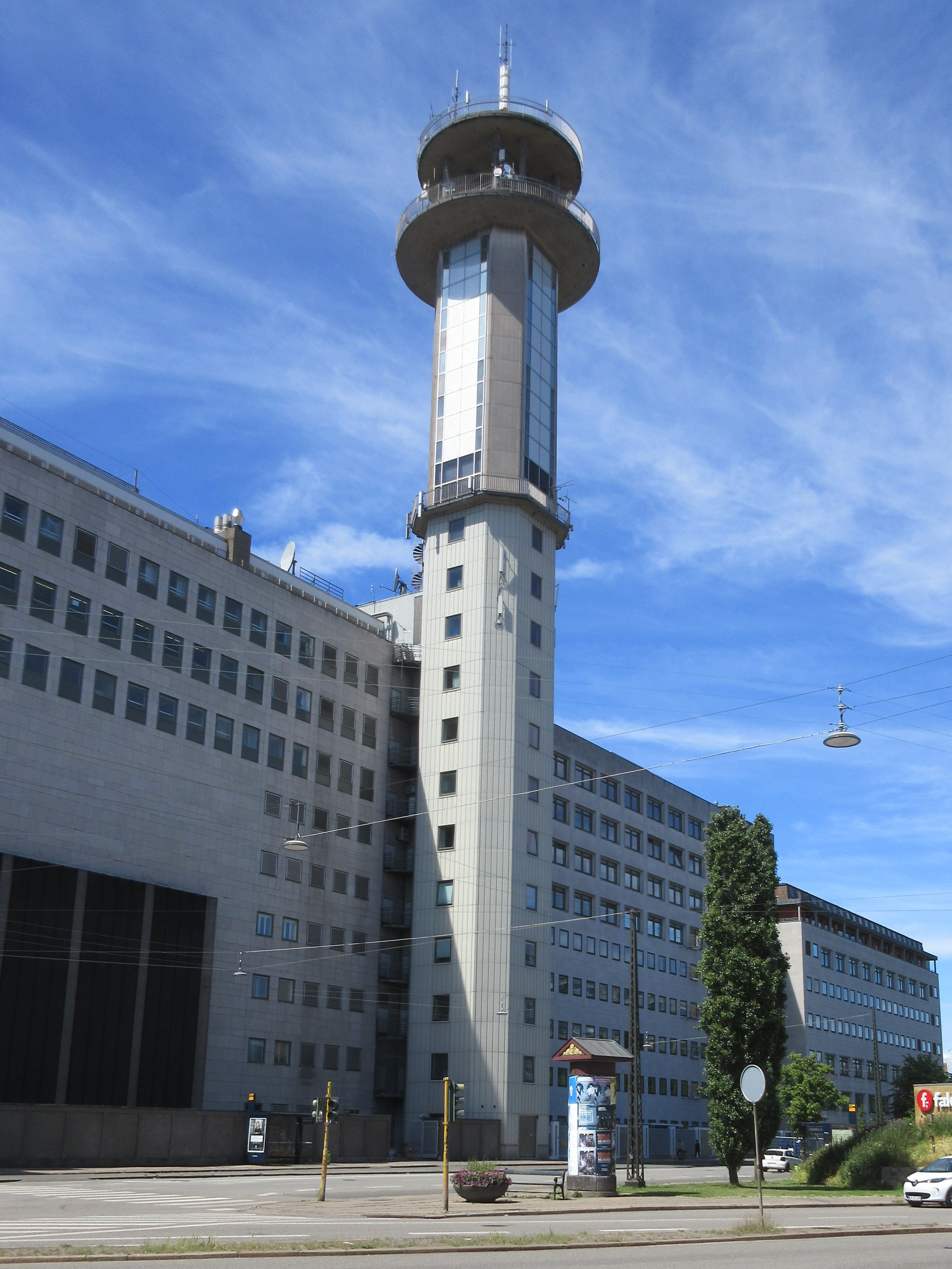
Telefonhuset

The Telephone House (No. 43) replaced the similarly named building in Nørregade as headquarters of KTAS (now TDC). The company still owns the building but is now headquartered in South Harbour. With its tower and location next to Bispeengbuen, the building is a visible landmark in the area.

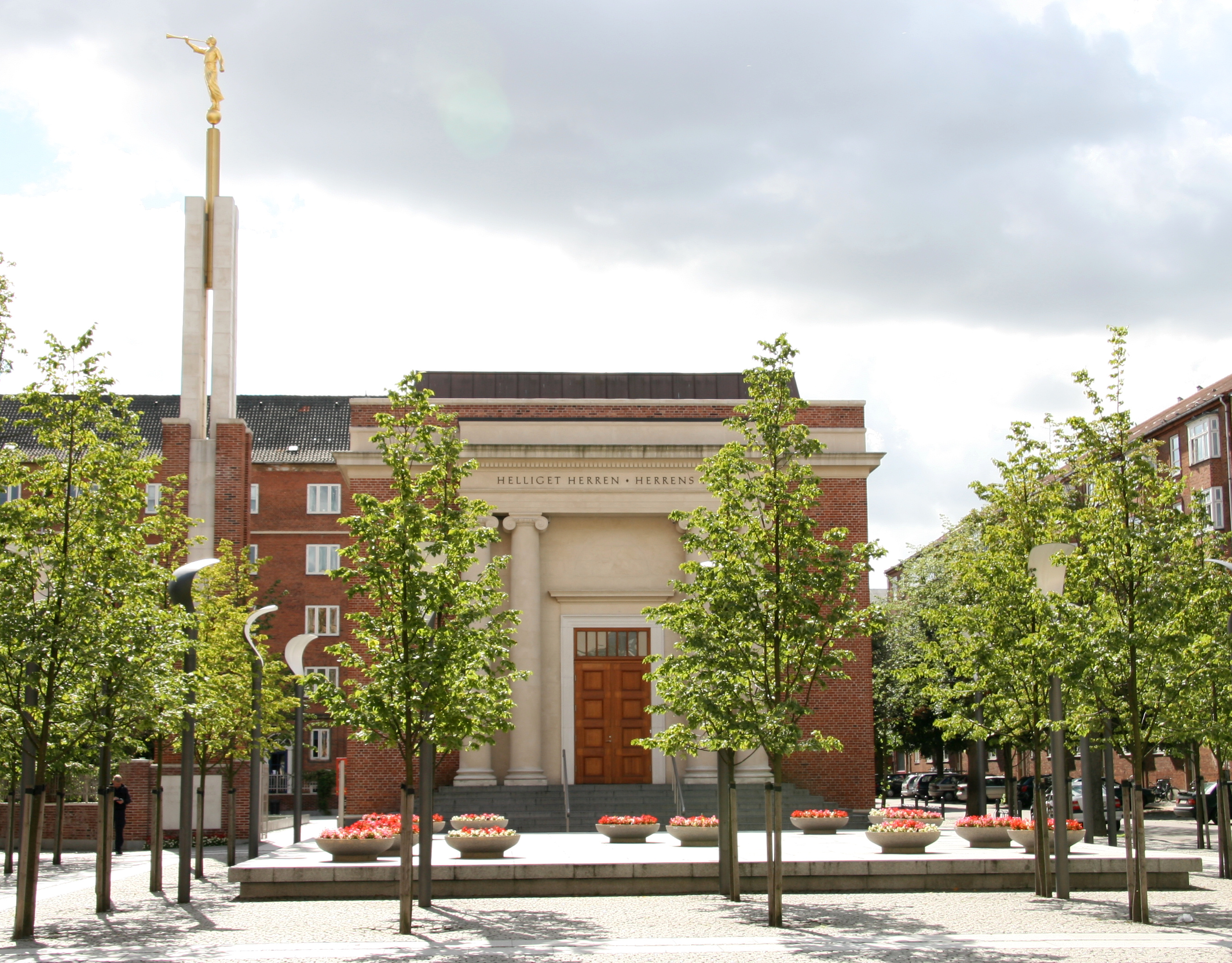
Copenhagen Denmark Temple

The Copenhagen Denmark Temple on Priorvej, the 118th operating temple of the Church of Jesus Christ of Latter-day Saints, fronts a small urban space on Borups Allé. Priorvej Chapel was originally built by the Latter-day Saints in 1931. It was converted into a temple in 1994.

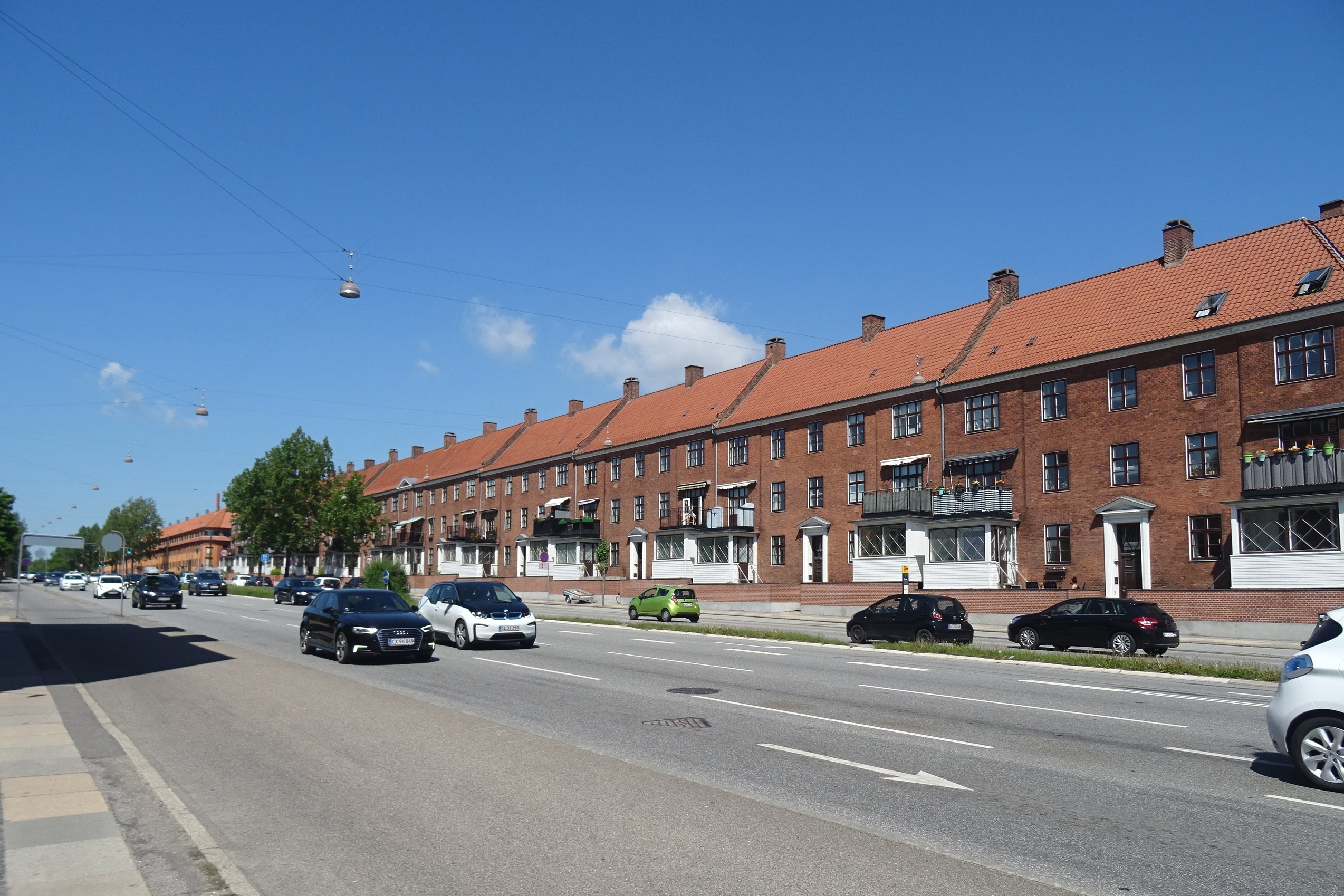
Grønnegaarden

Genforeningspladsen ('Reunion Square') is located to the south of Borups Allé and Hulgårdsvej. The development consists of eight residential blocks surrounding a sports ground with facilities for soccer, tennis and a running course which is turned into a 400-metre ice skating circuit in winter. The residential buildings were designed by different architects and built between 1919 and 1932. They are arranged according to strictly symmetrical plans centred on an axis with various urban spaces and landscape elements that run from the top of the green Bellahøj Hill to Gandhis Plæne at Borups Allé. The name refers to the Reunion of Denmark and northern Schleswig in 1920.

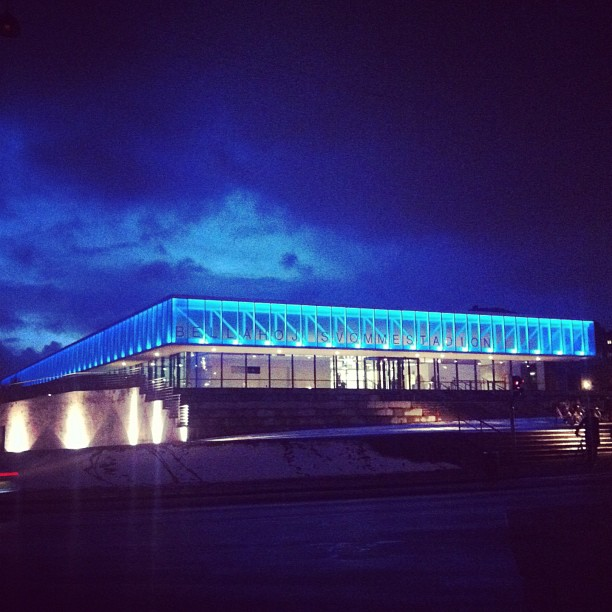
Bellahøj Swimming Stadium

Across the street from Gandhi's Lawn, between Vibevej and Mågevej, is another residential development, Grønnegaarden (No. 180-198), a two-storey block from 1923 designed by Povl Baumann. Next to it, north of Mågevej, is Vestergårdsporten, a residential development from 1918. Two of the blocks (C and D) were designed by Anton Rosen.

Bellahøj Swimming Stadium is located at the southwestern corner of Borups Allé and Frederikssundsvej.

== Transport ==
Fuglebakken station serves the Ringbanen S-train line. Nuuks Plads is a station on the City Circle Line of the Copenhagen Metro.

== See also ==
- Frederikssundsvej
