= Åboulevard =

Street in Copenhagen, Denmark

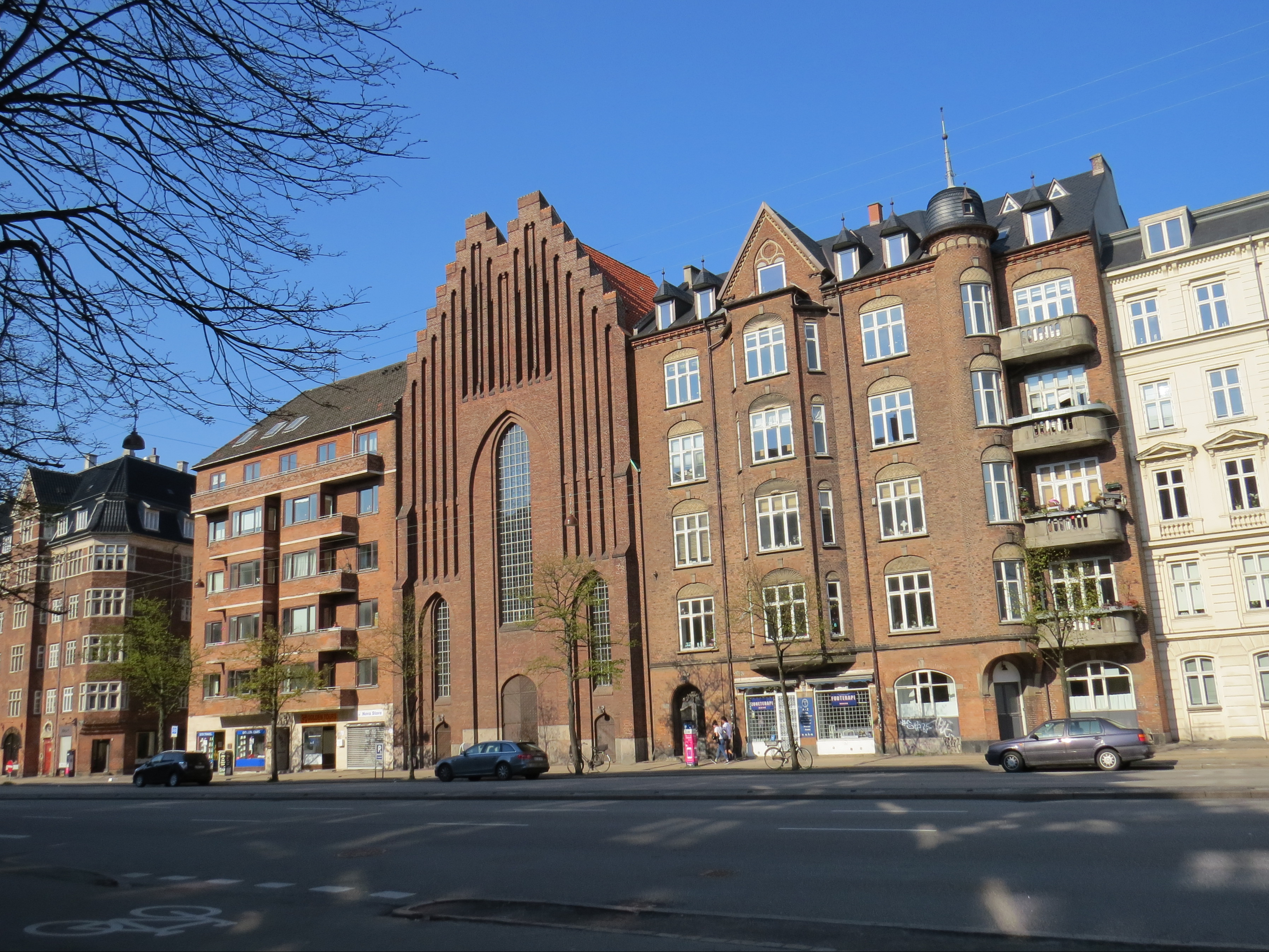
- Åboulevard's north side with the Bethlehem Church
- Interactive map of Åboulevard
- Length: 1,000 m (3,300 ft)
- Location: Copenhagen, Denmark
- Quarter: Frederiksberg, Nørrebro
- Postal code: 1635, 1960, 2200
- Nearest metro station: Nuuks Plads Station
- Coordinates: 55°41′6″N 12°33′10.08″E
- Southeast end: Gyldenløvesgade
- Major junctions: Falkoner Allé/Jagtvej
- Northwest end: Ågade

Åboulevard (lit. 'River Boulevard') is a street in central Copenhagen, Denmark. Together with H. C. Andersens Boulevard in the city centre and Borups Allé, it forms a major artery in and out of the city. The road is built over Ladegårds Å, a canal originally built to supply Copenhagen with water, which still runs in a pipe under it, feeding water into Peblinge Lake.

== History ==
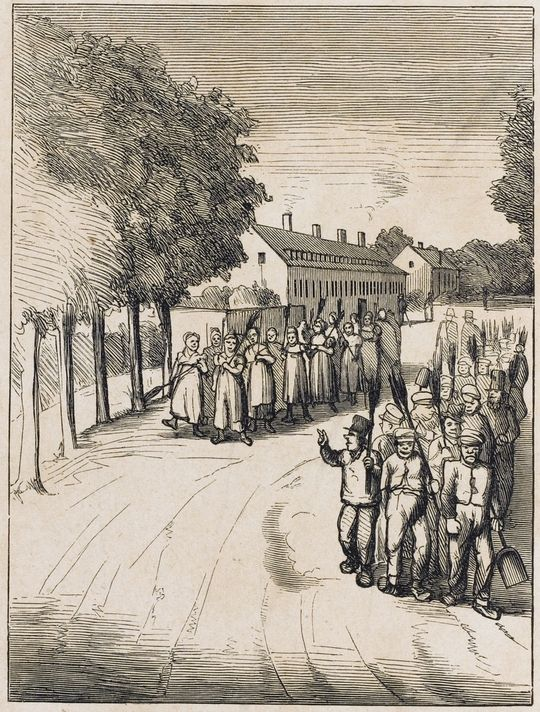
1880: residents of Ladegården with brooms on the way to town to work

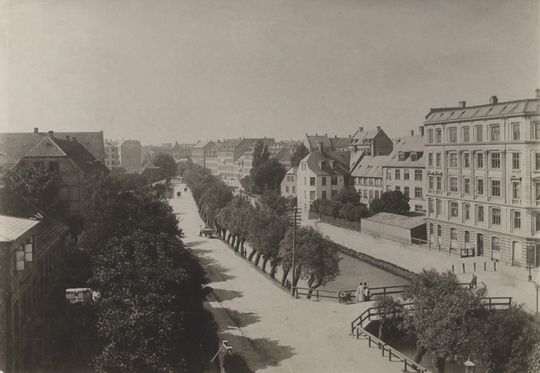
Ladegårdå viewed from Ladegårdsvej 1, looking west. The bridge in the foreground is located at Ewaldsgade (near Peblinge Lake).

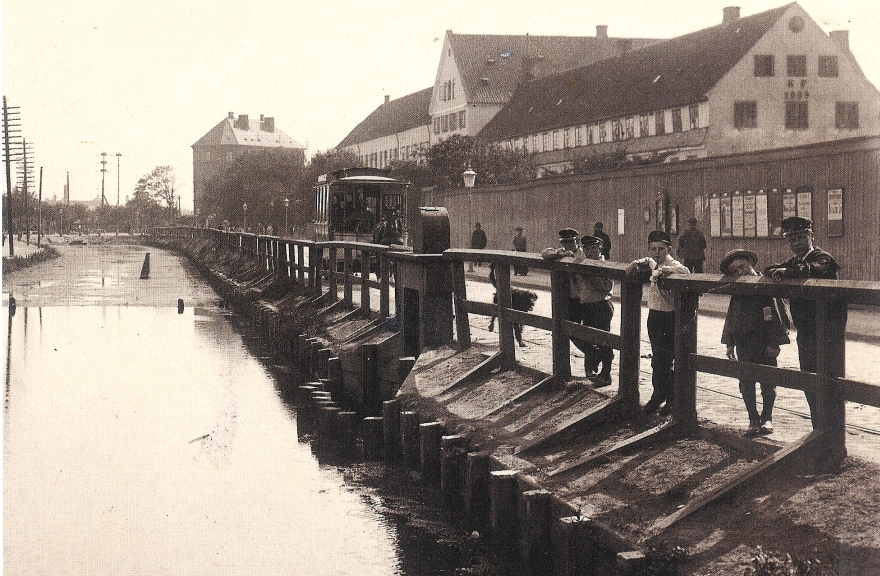
Ladegårdå Canal with the adjacent street

The canal was dug during the late Middle Ages to supply Copenhagen with drinking water from Damhus Lake, and from about 1550, also Lundehus Lake. The name Ladegårdså (Ladegårds Å, Ladegårdsåen) originates from Ladegården, a farm under Copenhagen Castle which was located on the south bank of the stream, roughly where the Radio House is today. It was built in 1623 to provide produce for the royal household and feed for the royal mews, but was never a success. The complex was later converted into first a military hospice and later a poorhouse with an associated textile manufactory.

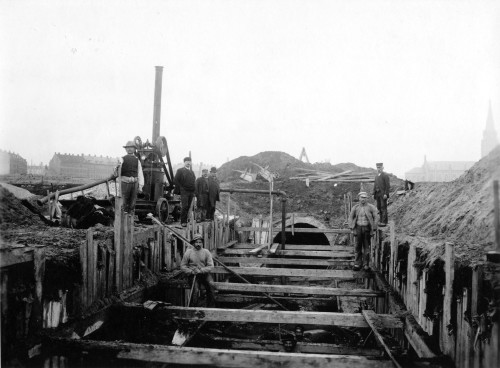
Covering the first section of the canal in 1896. A traction engine is used to pump away the water.

A road on the south side of the stream was called Ladegårdsvej ("Ladegård Road") while the north side was called Ågade ("River Street"). The lower part of the stream, from Brohusgade to Peblinge Lake, was covered in 1897 to allow for an expansion of the road. Ågade was renamed Åboulevard ("River Boulevard") while Ladegårdsvej continued to run parallel to it. Ladegården closed as a poorhouse in 1908 and was replaced by Sundholm on Amager.

Ladegårdsvej disappeared in connection with an expansion of Åboulevard, and the rest of the remainder of the stream was covered in 1942. The elevated road Bispeengbuen was built in 1970–1972, connecting Åboulevard to Borups Allé.

== Notable buildings and residents ==
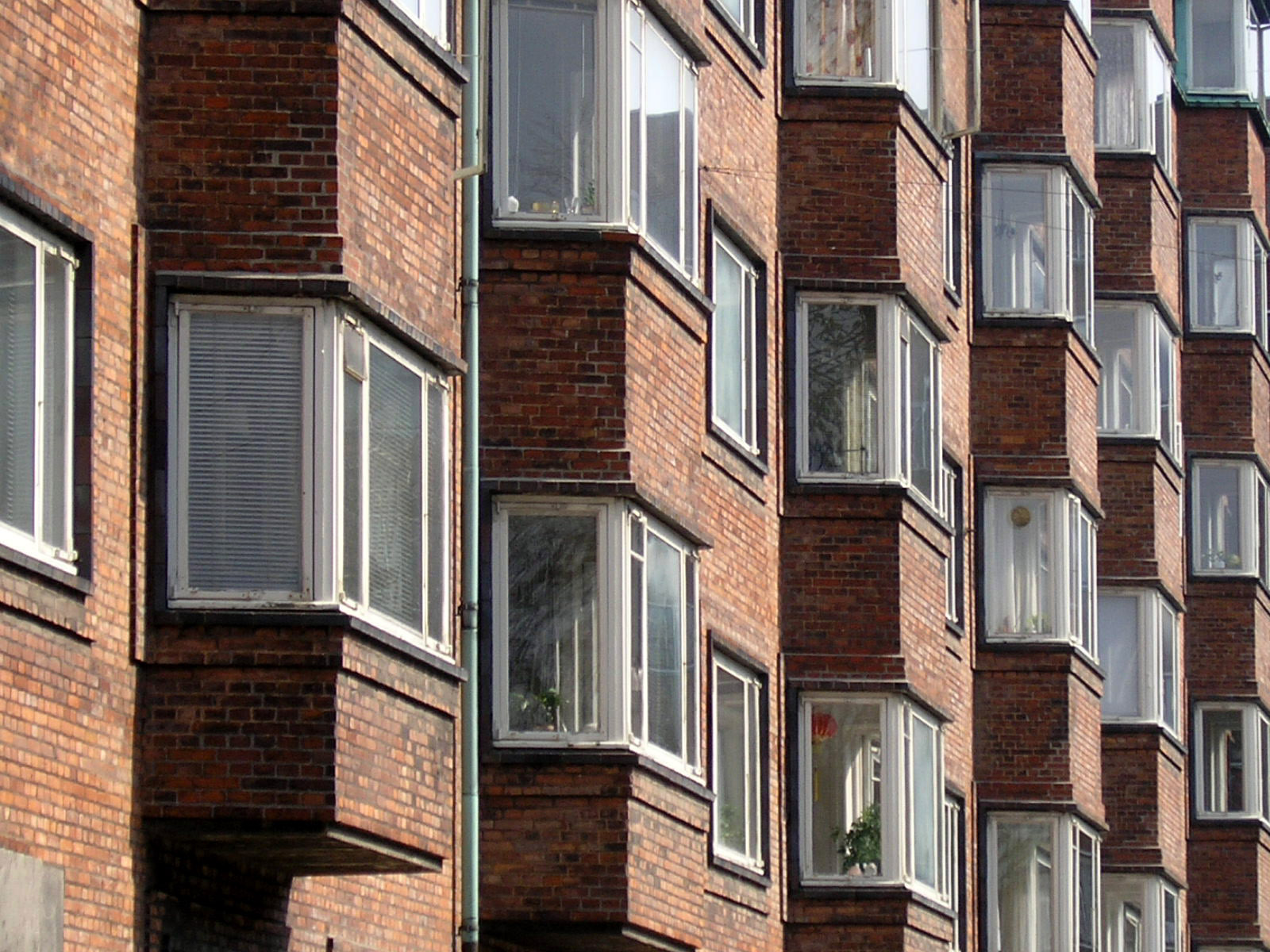
Hermanhus' bay windows

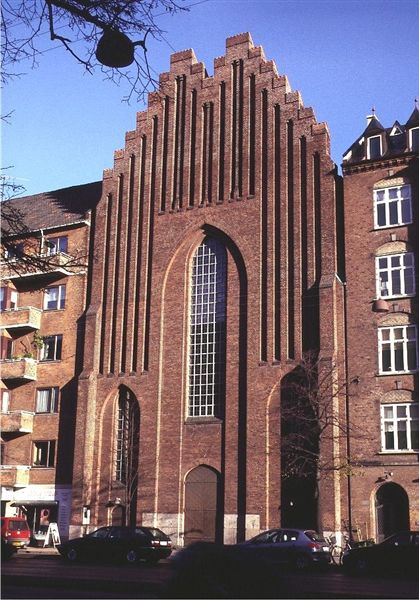
No. 8: Bethlehem Church

The Functionalist apartment building Trekanten ("The Triangle") on the rounded corner of Åboulevard and Rosenørns Allé was designed by Kay Fisker. In collaboration with C. F. Møller, Fisker also designed the neighbouring housing estate, Hermanhus, which consists of two buildings surrounding a greenspace called Hermann Triers Plads ("Hermann Trier's Square"). The bay windows are typical of his Functionalist style. The buildings were listed in 1981.

The Bethlehem Church (No. 8) was designed by Peder Vilhelm Jensen-Klint and completed by his son Kaare Klint in 1937. The design resembles that of Jensen-Klint's most famous work, the monumental Grundtvig's Church in Bispebjerg. Åhusene ("The River Houses", No. 12–14 and 16–18), two identical apartment buildings situated next to the church, were designed by Ulrik Plesner and date from 1896 to 1898.

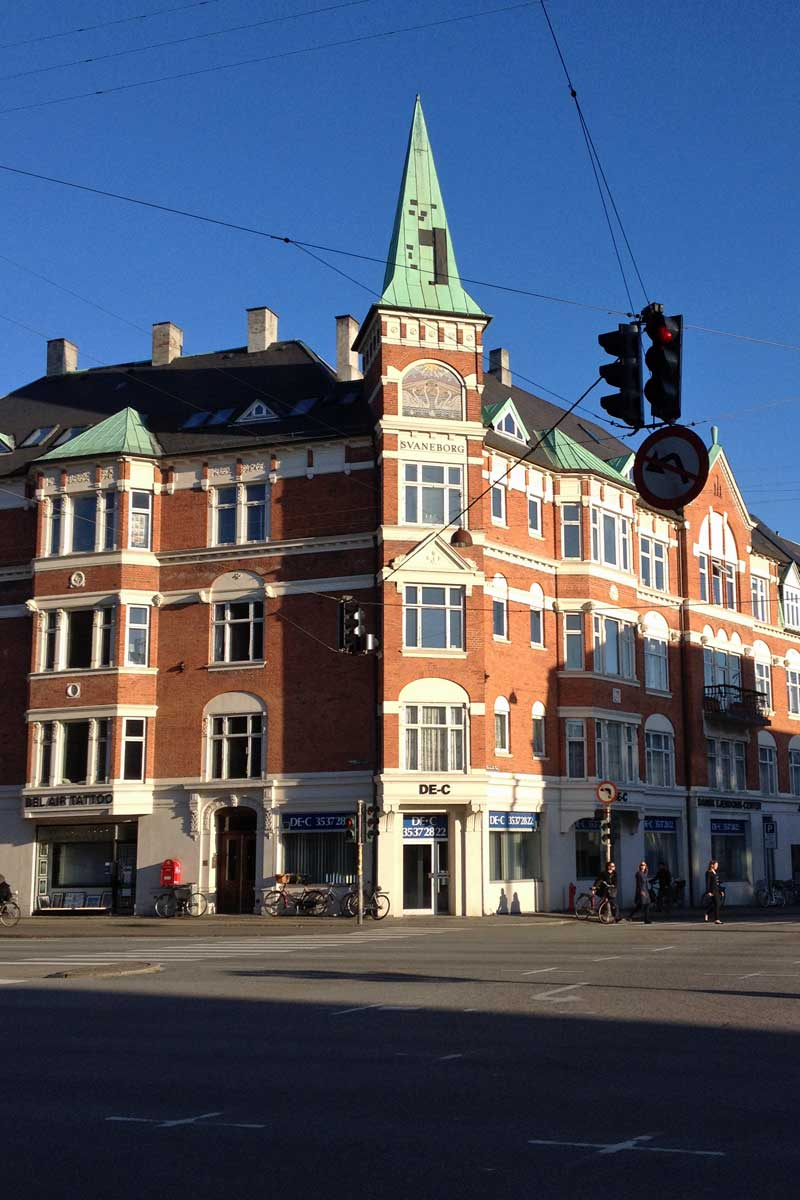
No. 31: Svaneborg

The Avenue Hotel (No. 29) is a 68-room boutique hotel, now part of Brøchner Hotels. The Historicist hotel building was completed in 1898 to a design by Emil Blichfeldt, who also designed the main entrance to Tivoli Gardens. Its neighbor, Svaneborg (No. 31), situated at the corner with H. C. Ørsteds Vej, was completed in 1899 to a design by Philip Smidth.

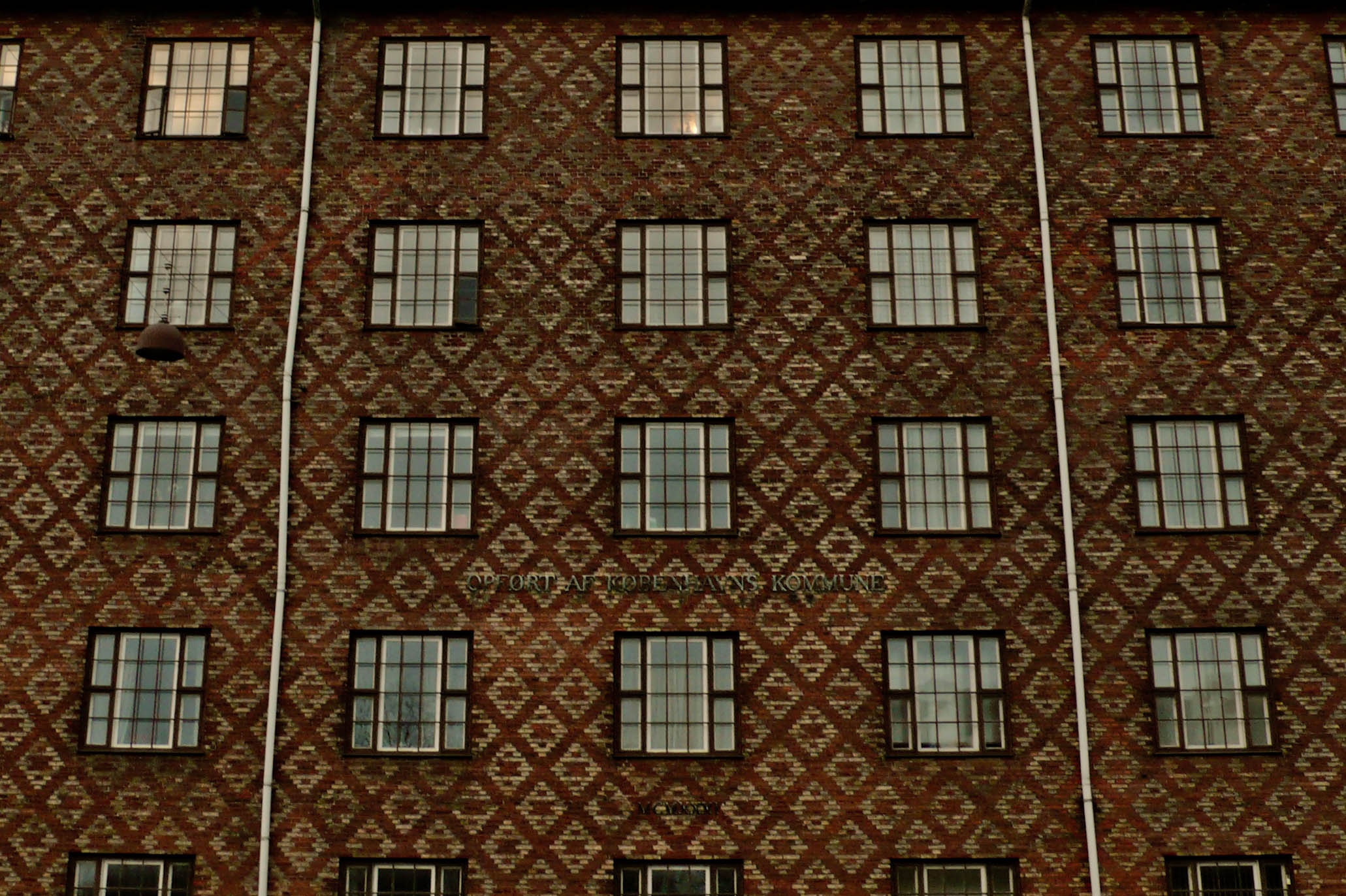
Linoleumshuset's patterned brickwork

The apartment building at No. 55 at the corner with Bülowsvej is from 1903 and was designed by Heinrich Hansen. Linoleumshuset ("The Linoleum House", No. 84–86) is named for its patterned brickwork resembling old-fashioned linoleum flooring. The building was designed by Povl Baumann and completed in 1930. It was listed in 2009.

== Memorial ==
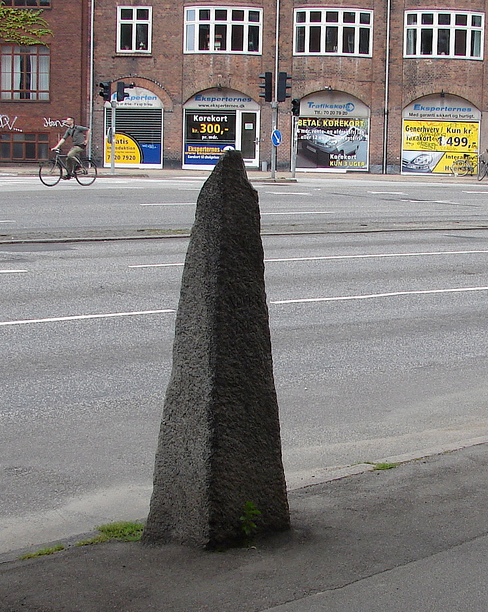
The Memorial to the Drowned

A pyramidical granite stone in the street side outside No. 16 commemorates an accident that occurred on the night between 26 and 27 November 1812, when a carriage with five women and a boy, on its way from the country house Rolighed drove into town and fell into the water at Ladegården. Two of the women drowned. Tradition had it that a pointed granite stone was installed in the water at the site of the accident to commemorate the event. The stone is an old water level marker. The stone used to have an inscription, no longer legible, reading "26–27 November 1812". When Ladegårds Å was filled to create the current Åboulevard, this memorial was installed between the trees on the boulevard at the site where it formerly stood in the water.

The artwork City Wall (Bymuren) was designed by Morte Stræd and was installed in connection with the creation of three new urban spaces between the bicycle bridge Åbuen and Rantzausgade in 2011.

== Transport ==
The bicycle bridge Åbuen was installed in 2008 as part of the Nørrebro Route, a section of Copenhagen's network of super bikeways. The bikeway uses part of the alignment of the abandoned rail line between Nørrebro station and Copenhagen's second Central Station at Axeltorv on its way from Emdrup in the north to Valby in the south.

== Re-opening of the canal ==
It has been proposed to re-establish the Ladegårdså Canal by placing it on top of a 3-km long car tunnel. The project was put on hold in 2013 after a report from Rambøll deemed it too expensive.
