= Rentemestervej =

Street in Copenhagen, Denmark

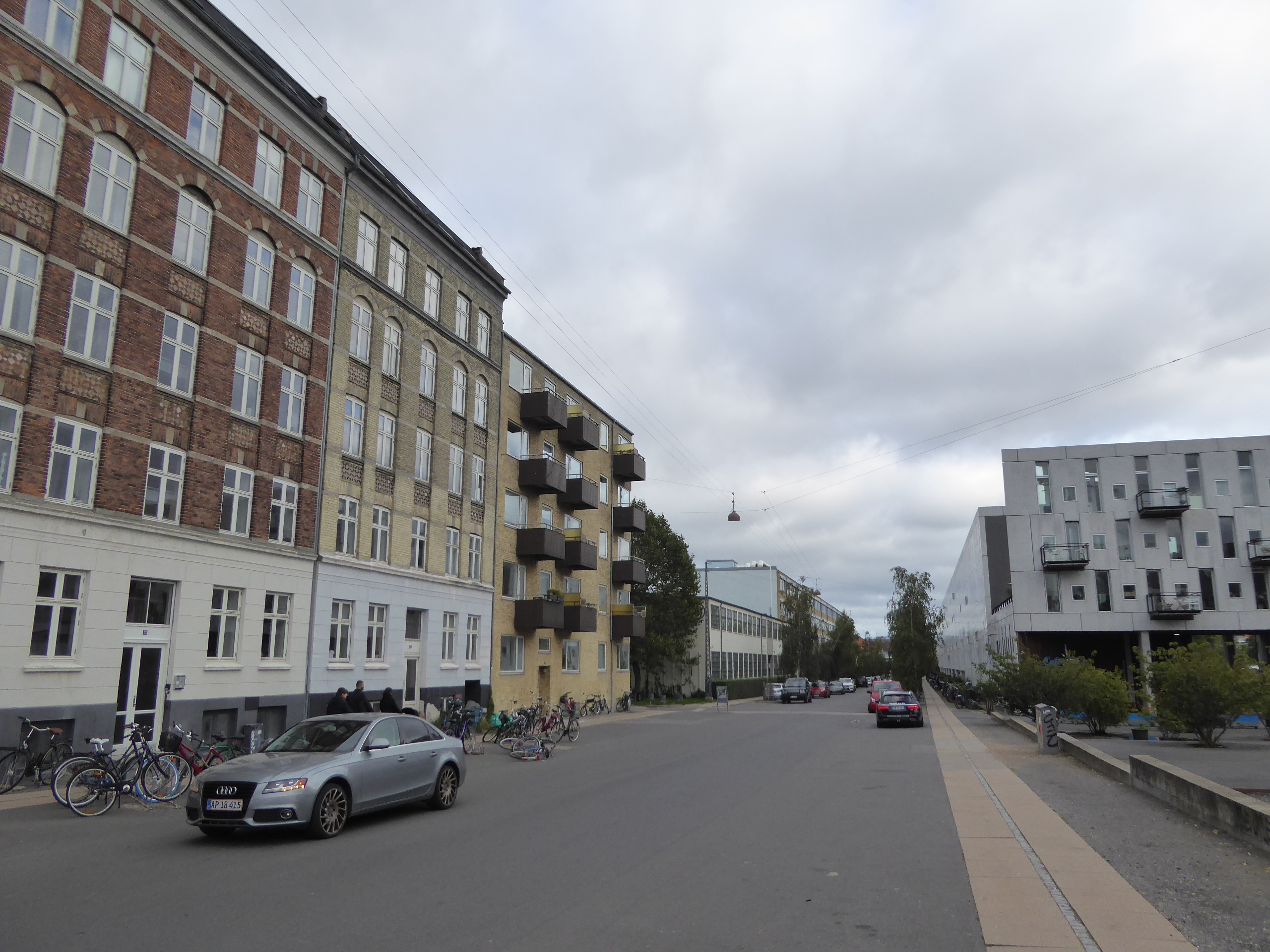
Rentemestervej.

Rentemestervej is an approximately 1.4 km long street in the North-West district of Copenhagen, Denmark. It runs from Lygten at Nørrebro station in the southeast to Utterslev Torv in the northwest.

== History ==
The street was originally called H. C. Nielsen's Vej but was renamed Rentemestervej in 1930. The area between Rentemestervej and Bispebjerg Bakke to the north was from around 1910 built over with industrial installations. The factories along the street included Glud & Marstrand, Techno and Schou' Soap Factory.

== Notable buildings ==
The Nielsen & Jespersen's former factory at No. 14 is from 1034 and designed in the Functionalist style. The factory was active until 1993 and the building was listed on the Danish registry of protected buildings and places in 1994.
