= Sønderjyllands Allé =

Street in Frederiksberg Municipality, Denmark

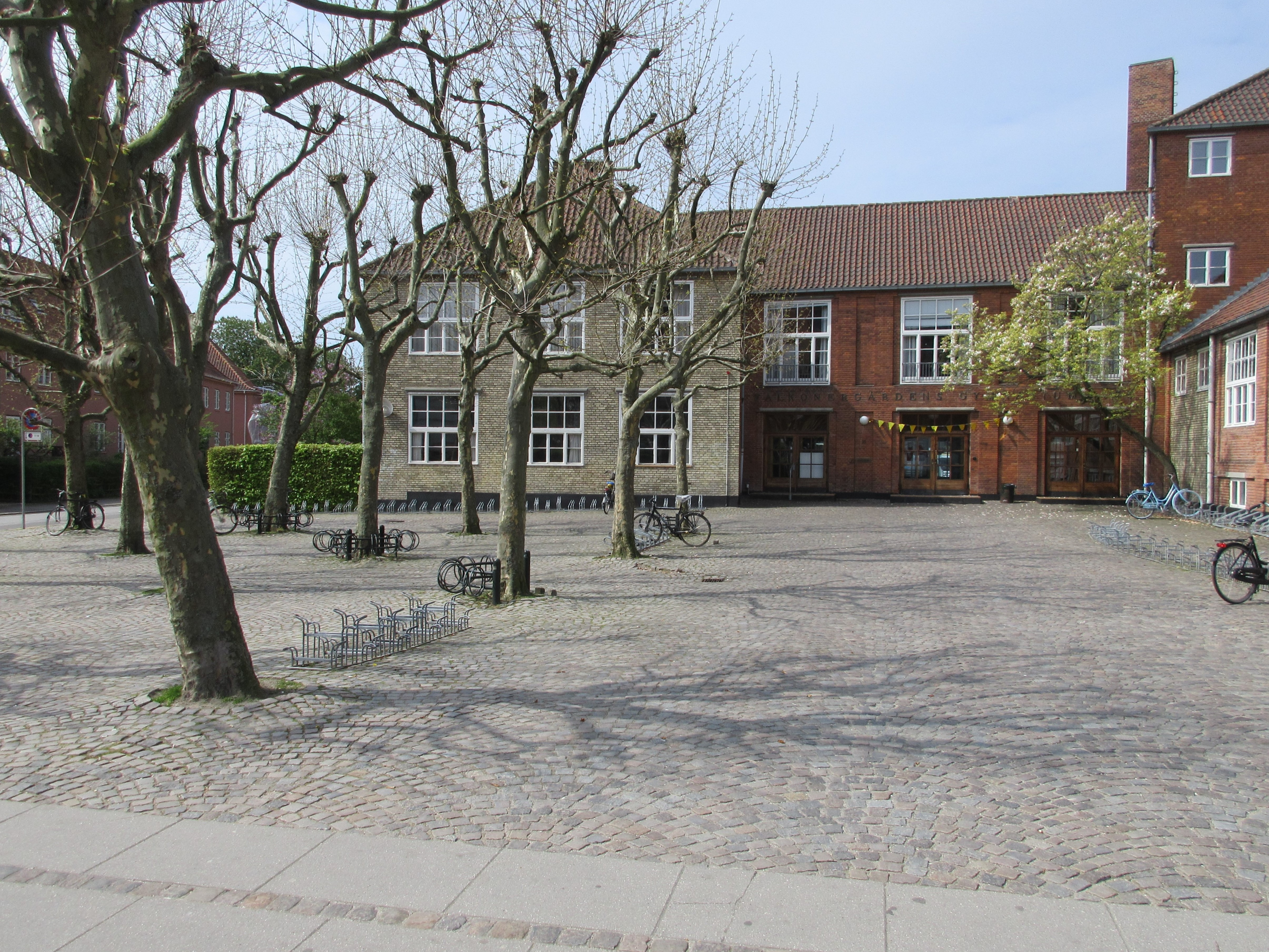
Falkonergårdens Gymnasium at No. 25

Sønderjyllands Allé is a street in the Frederiksberg district of Copenhagen, Denmark. It runs from Peter Bangs Vej in the southeast to Finsensvej in the northwest.

== History ==
The street was created in 1914 and was originally called Diagonalvej (Diagonal Road). It received its current name in 1920 to commemorate Denmark's reunion with Sønderjylland. The surrounding area was developed over the next year and the streets were named for politicians associated with the event.

== Notable buildings and residents ==
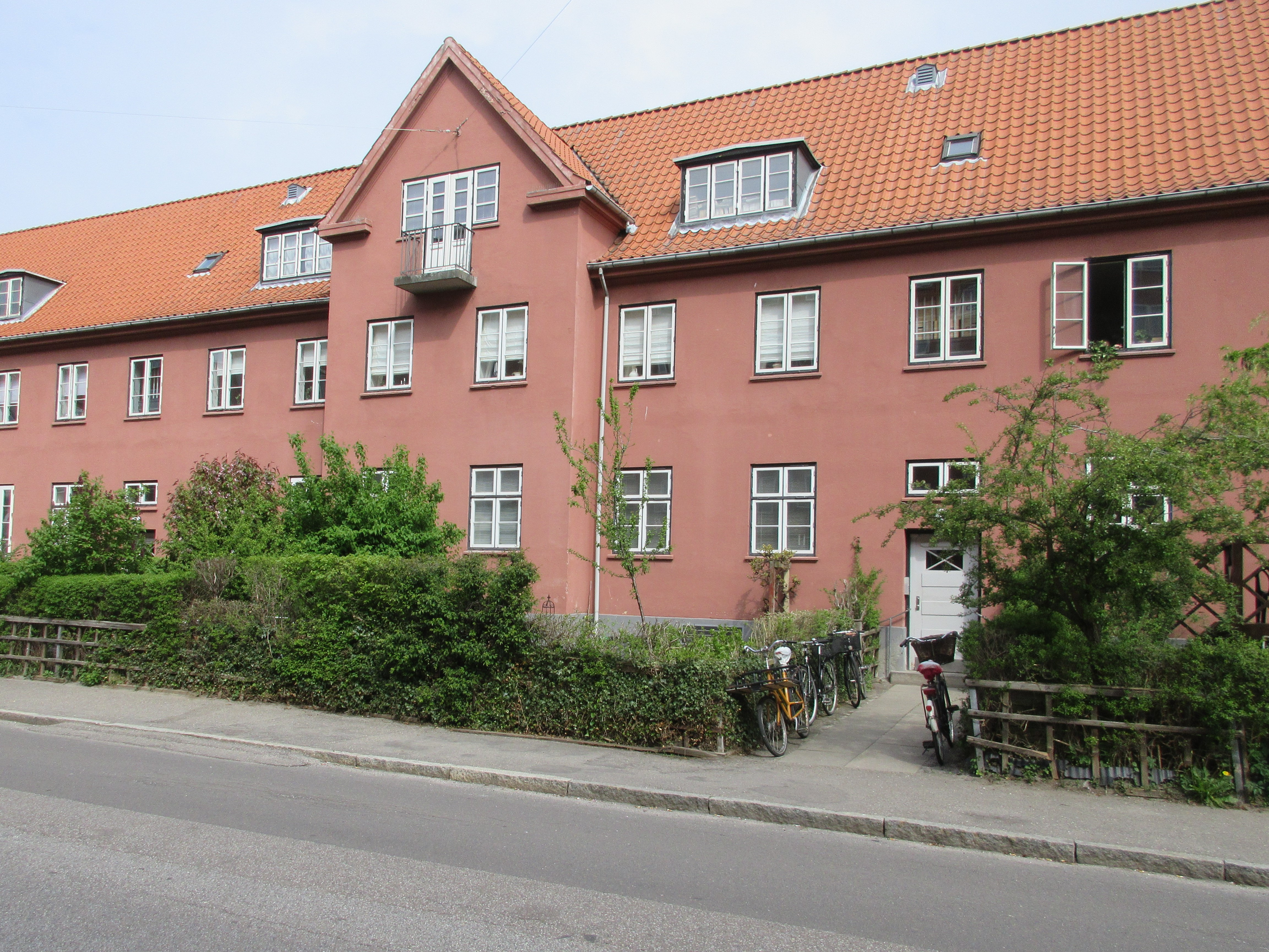
Den Sønderjyske By

Den Sønderjyske By is a development of two-storey houses built with inspiration from British architecture.

Sønderjyllands Allé 6 (No.6), situated across the street from Den Sønderjyske By, is a sports venue. It is part of Frederiksberg Idrætspark (Frederiksberg Sports Park).

Falkonergårdens Gymnasium (No. 25) opened at the site in 1953. It had previously been located at Danas Plads.

== See also ==
- Dalgas Boulevard
