= Peter Bangs Vej =

Street in Copenhagen, Denmark

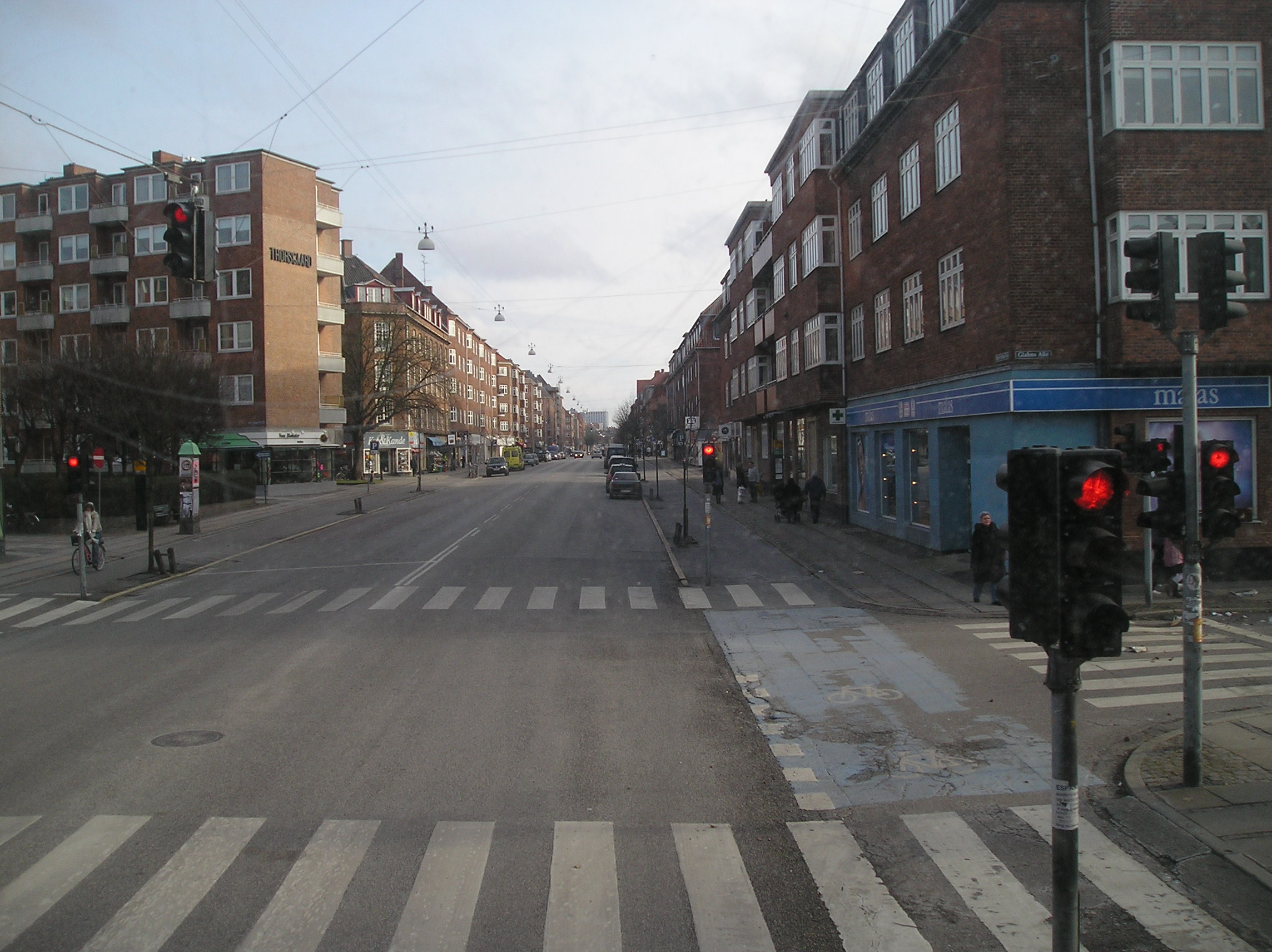
- Interactive map of Peter Bangs Vej
- Length: 2,780 m (9,120 ft)
- Location: Copenhagen, Denmark
- Quarter: Frederiksberg
- Postal code: 1619, 1859
- Nearest metro station: Peter Bangs Vej, Fasanvej
- Coordinates: 55°40′43.68″N 12°30′25.92″E
- Northeast end: Smallegade
- Major junctions: Dalgas Boulevard, Ring 2
- Southwest end: Roskildevej

Peter Bangs Vej is a 2.2 km long street in Frederiksberg, a city in the Copenhagen area on the island of Zealand, Denmark. The direct continuation of Smallegade, it initially runs west, from Nordre Fasanvej, but then turns south along the east side of Damhus Lake to meet Roskildevej. There is a large sports complex on the south end of the street with the football club F.C. Copenhagen's training facilities as well as the multi-purpose venue K.B. Hallen.

== History ==
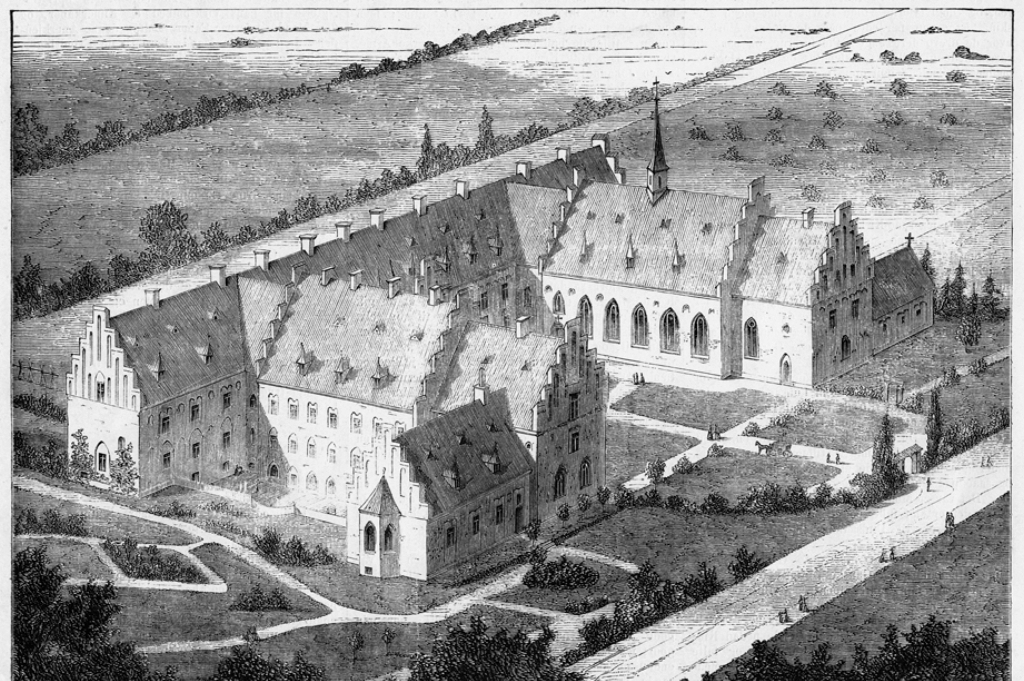
Peter Bangs Vej with Diakonissestiftelsen

A field track referred to as Klammerivejen (literally Vrewl Road) followed the same route from at least 1755. It is probably older since documents from 1688 mentions "Clammerijs Agre". A popular but unverifiable explanation of the name is that the road was too narrow for two carriages to pass and that it was therefore liable to cause disputes. The track was the direct continuation of the Gammel Kongevej road which connected Copenhagen's Western City Gate to the village of Solbjerg, whose village pond can still be seen on the south side of Smallegade.

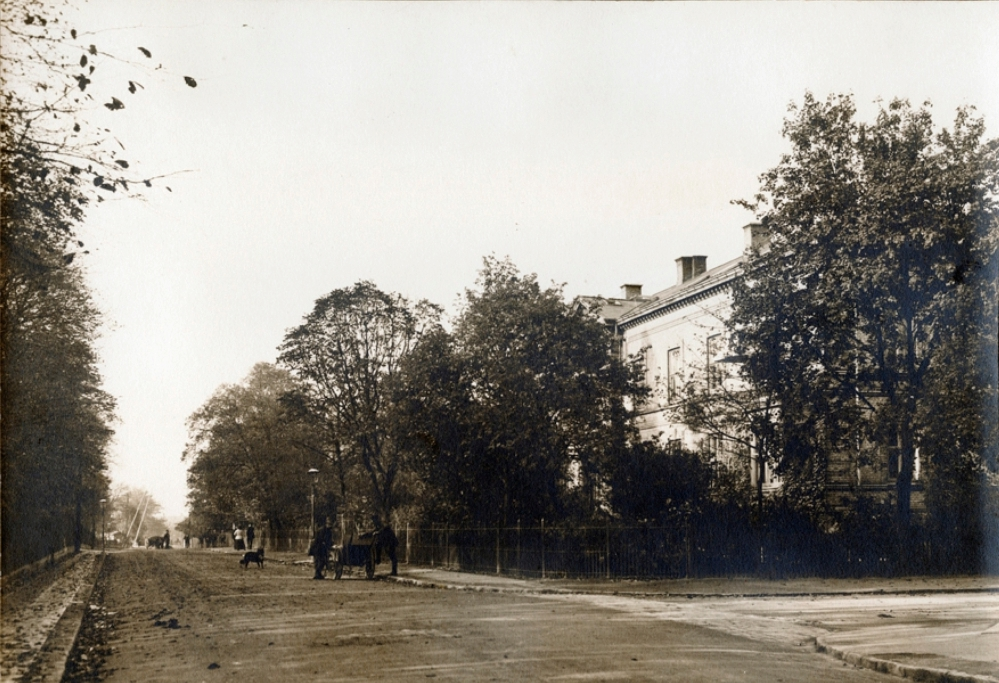
Peter Bangs Vej in 1913

The road received its current name on 8 October 1868. It was named after the politician Peter Georg Bang who had recently died. The first major building along the road was Diakonissestiftelsen's hospital from 1876. The old West Line crossed the road just east of present-day Lindevangs Allé. In 1914, the road was regulated and a tram line to Vanløse was inaugurated on 8 December that same year. Several large factories were built in the area between Peter Bangs Vej and Finsensvej in the 1900s and 1910s, such as Fisker & Nielsen's factory from 1913. The company both manufactured their Nilfisk vacuum cleaners and their Nimbus motorcycles at the site.

Kjøbenhavns Boldklub, Copenhagen's first ball-playing club, acquired a 6-hectare site on the south side of Peter Bangs Vej in 1924. The club inaugurated a large new sports complex at the site on 10 April 1928.

== Notable buildings and residents ==
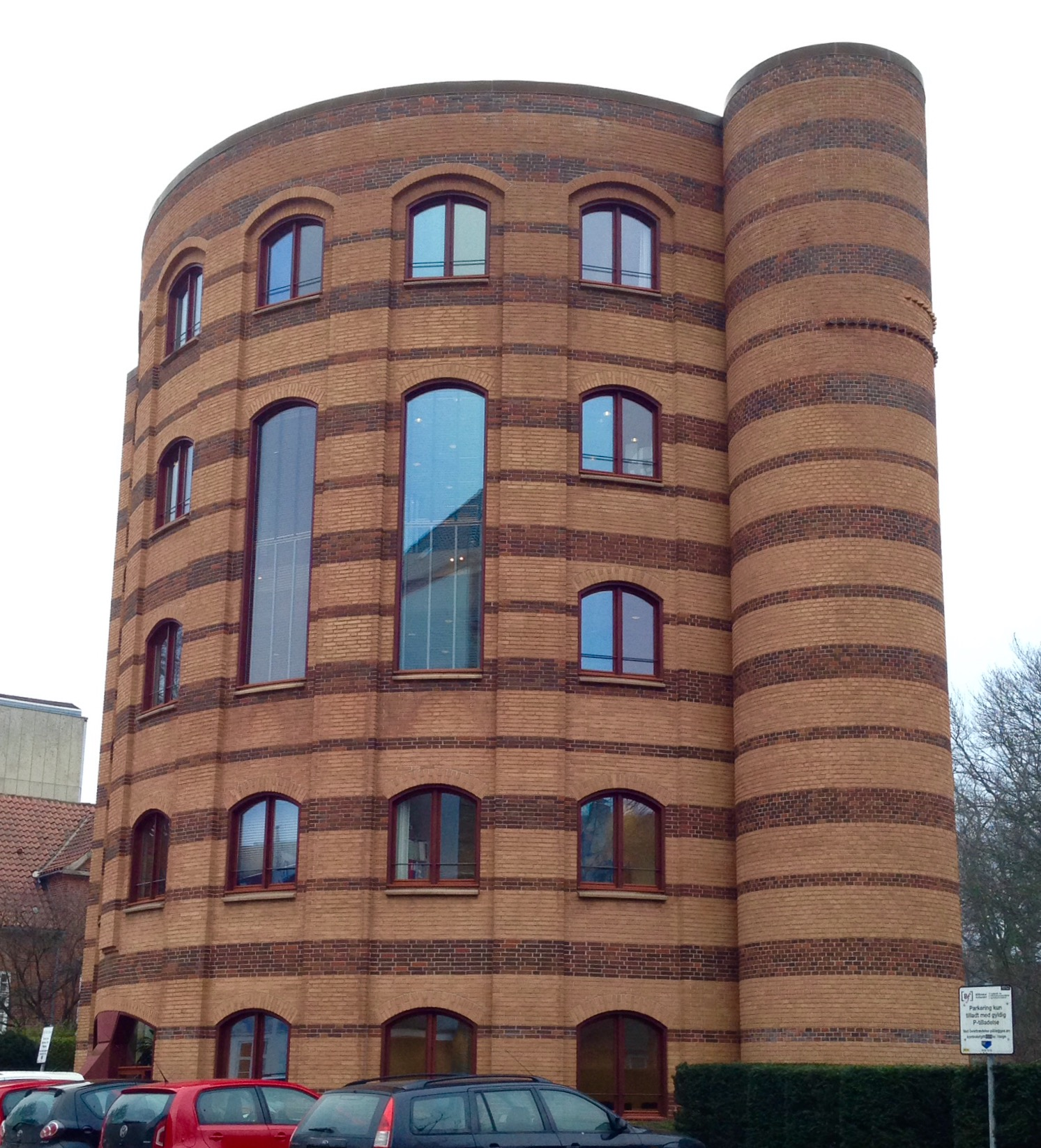
Danish Union of Librarians' building

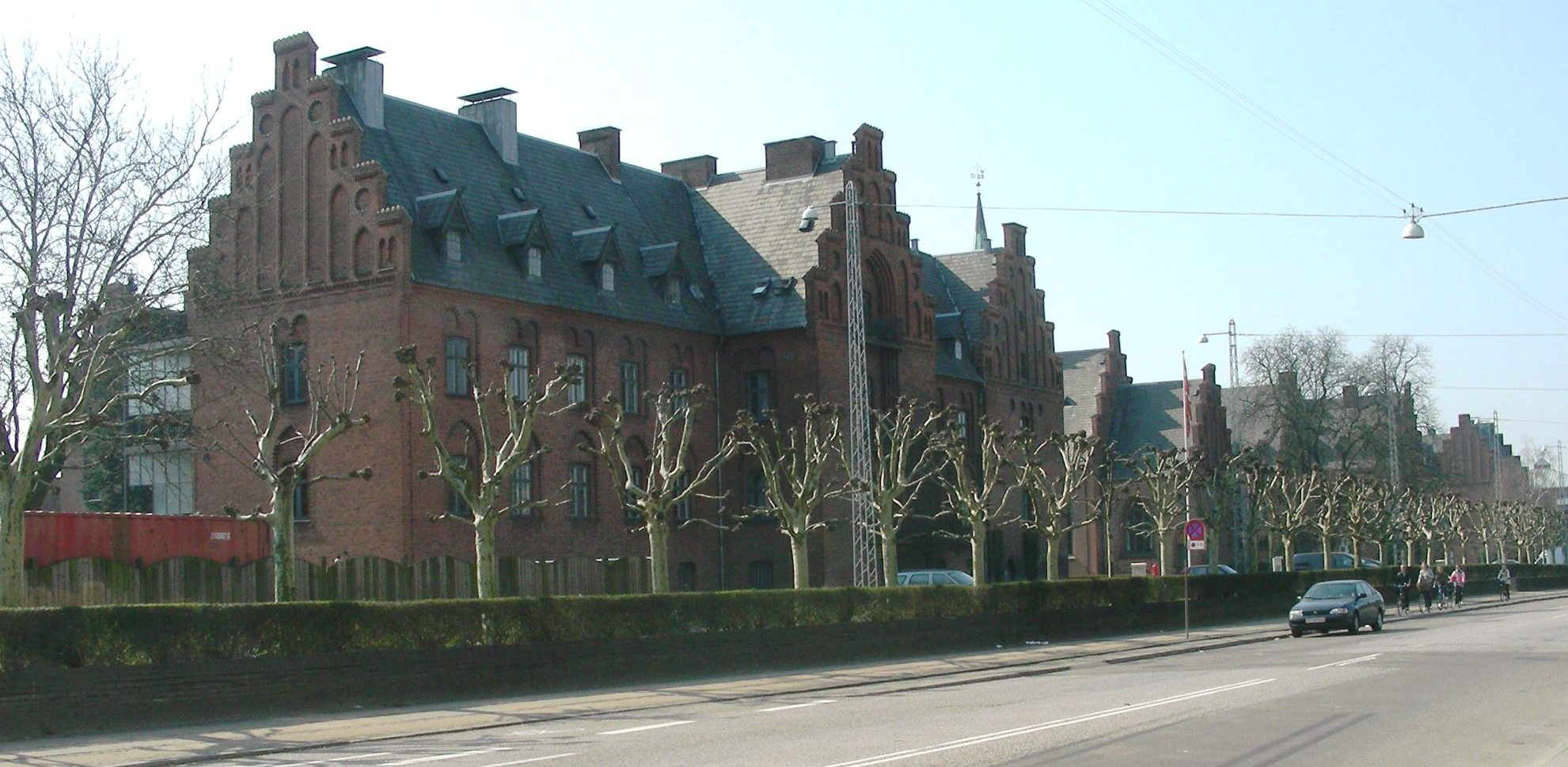
Diakonissestiftelsen seen from Peter Bangs Vej

Diakonissestiftelsen's old main building (No. 1) is from 1876 and was designed by Hans Jørgen Holm in the style of a medieval convent. The Deaconess Foundation has launched a 2020 plan for a comprehensive redevelopment of their site with residences as well as social and healthcare facilities.

The building Sarepta designed by Carl Lendorf (No. 8) and Teba (No. 10), both from the 1880s and located on the other side of the street, were also built of Diakonissestiftelsen. They have now been converted into the daycare Marthagården with a distinctive modern extension by Landager Arkitekter in 2013–14. To the rear of the two buildings stands the Postmodern, round headquarters of the Danish Union of Librarians. It was designed by Knud Munk.

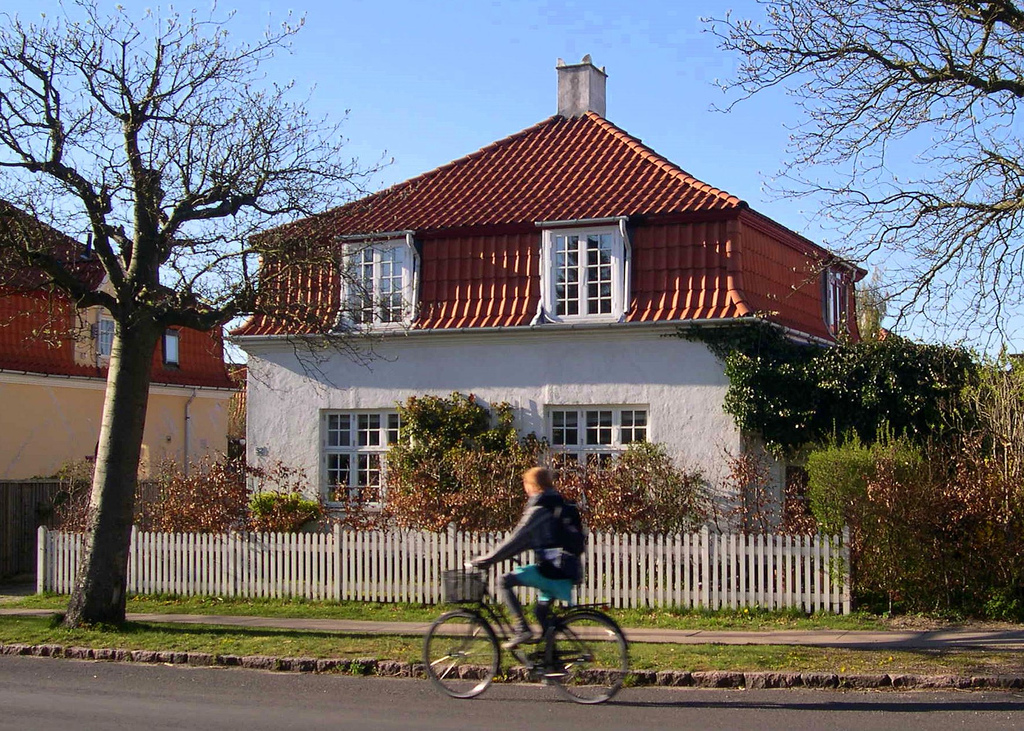
One of the White Houses on a side street to Peter Bangs Vej

The White Houses, situated a little further out, is a building society development originally built for workers at Frederiksberg Gasworks in the 1890s. The architect was Gotfred Tvede. Lindevang Church (No. 69) is from 1825 to 1830 and was designed by Thomas Havning and Anton Frederiksen.

Fisker & Nielsen's former factory site was redeveloped between 2002 and 2008 and is now known as Nimbusparken (Peter Bangs Vej 30/ H. V. Nyholms Vej). It contains a mixture of residential and commercial buildings and reuses some of the old industrial buildings. The Danish Association of Masters and PhDs is based in the building directly on the street (No. 30).

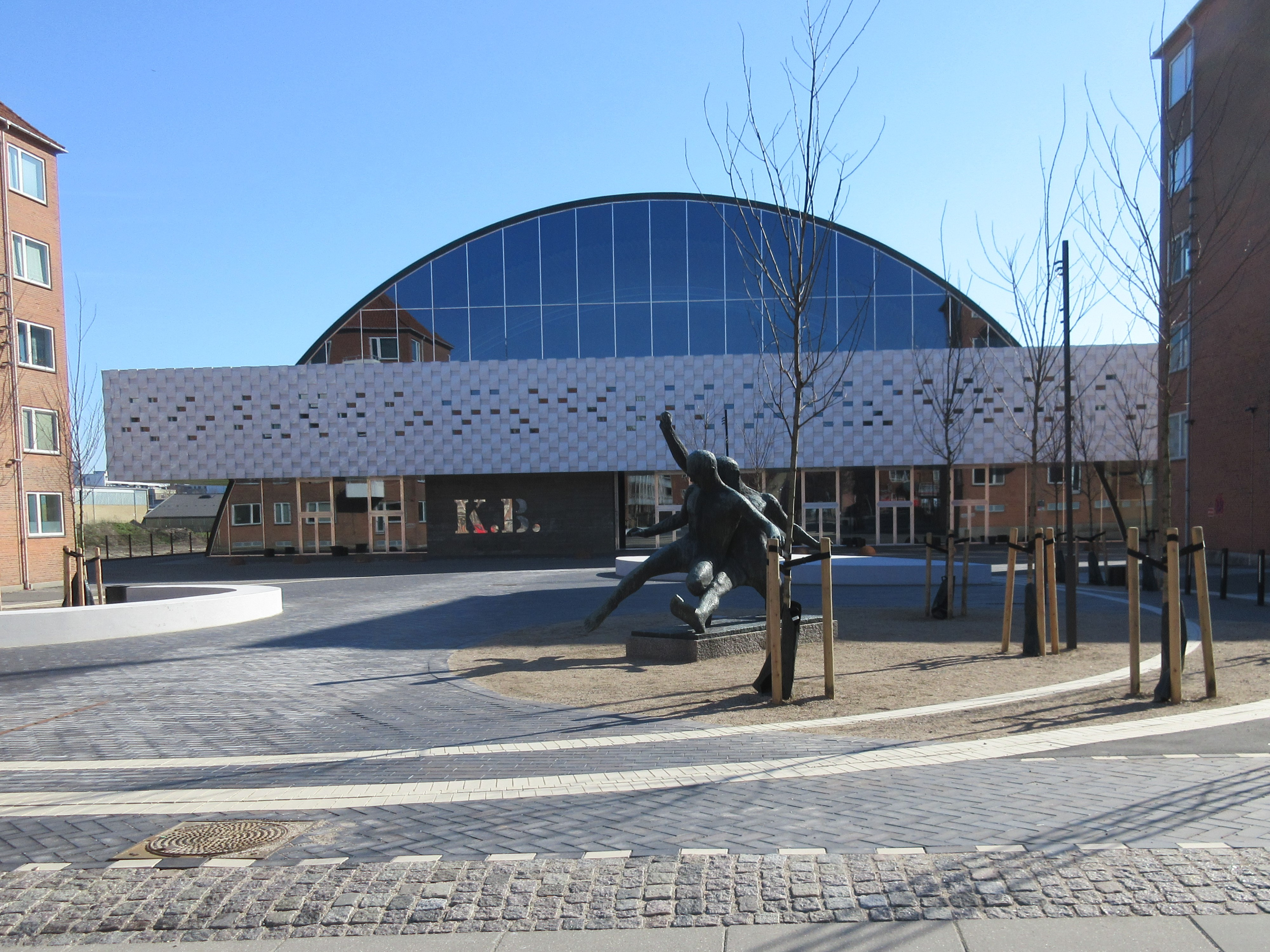
No. 147: K.B. Hallen

Kjøbenhavns Boldklub's extensive sports complex at Peter Bangs Vej is the primary training grounds of F.C. Copenhagen. The site also included the listed multi-purpose venue K.B. Hallen venue from 1938 but it was destroyed in a fire in 2011. Christensen & Co has won a competition to build a new KB-Hallen to a new design inspired by the old building.

== Parks and open spaces ==
Several green spaces are located along the street. Lindevangsparken is located just north of the park. It was created and 1932 and has an area of 33,000 square metres, making it the largest and oldest municipal park in Frederiksberg. The much larger and older Frederiksberg Park and Søndermarken are state-owned. The Damhus Lake and adjoining Damhus Meadow in Vanløse is located just west of the street.

== Transport ==
Peter Bangs Vej station is located on the Frederikssund radial of the S-train network and is served by the C trains. KB Hallen station is located on the Ring Line between Hellerup and Ny Ellebjerg and is served by the F service.

The Inner Ring Route of Copenhagen's super bikeway network passes Diakonissestiftelsen on its way from Emdrup to Valby.
