= Finsensvej =

Street in Frederiksberg Municipality, Denmark

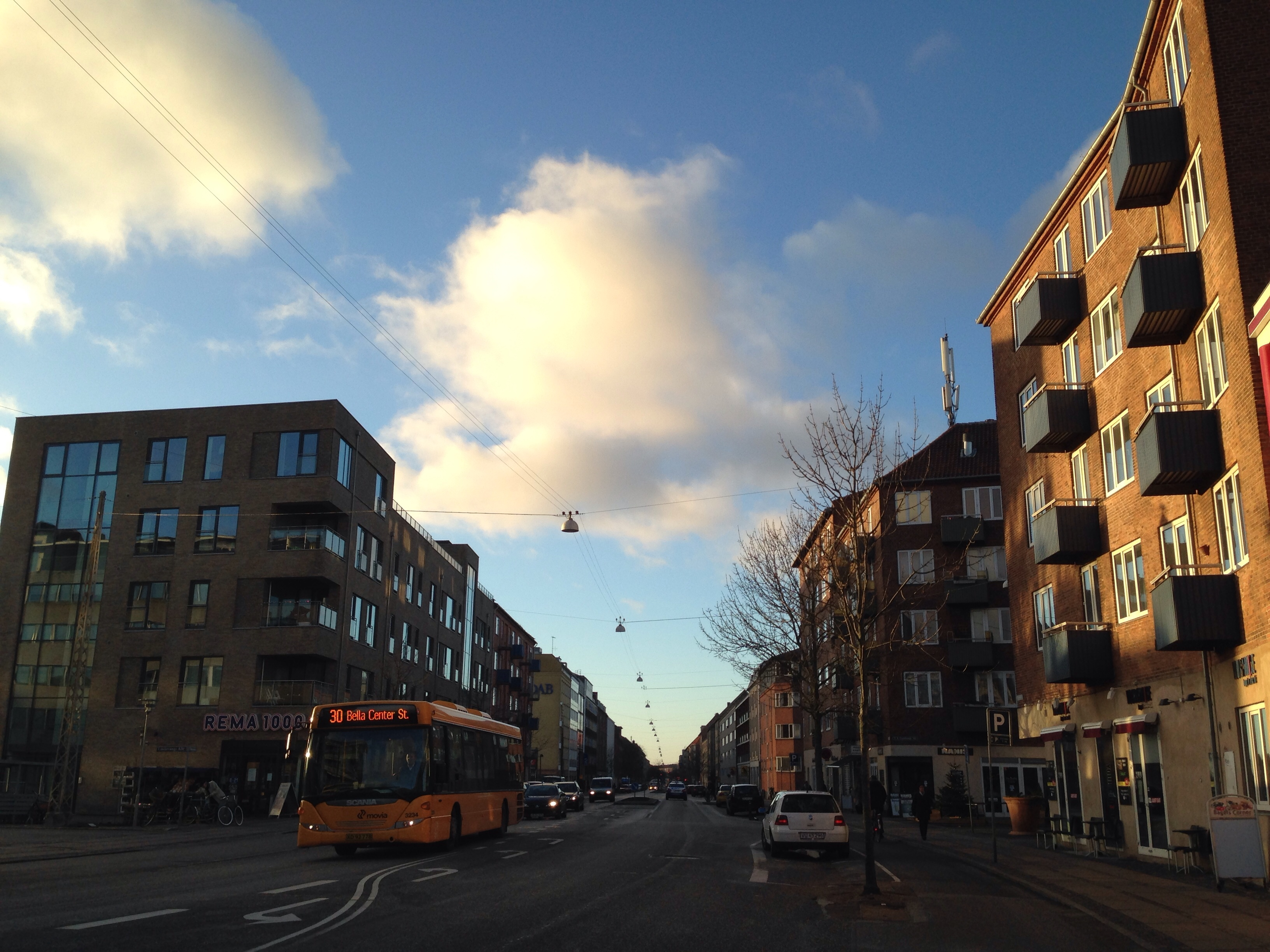
- Finsensvej, looking west
- Interactive map of Finsensvej
- Length: 1,660 m (5,450 ft)
- Location: Frederiksberg, Copenhagen, Denmark
- Postal code: 2000
- Coordinates: 55°40′59.93″N 12°30′43.26″E
- East end: Howitzvej
- Major junctions: Dalgas Boulevard
- West end: Jernbane Allé

Finsensvej is a major street in the Frederiksberg district of Copenhagen, Denmark. The direct continuation of Howitzvej, it runs from Nordre Fasanvej in the east to the northern end of Sønderjyllands Allé in the west where it turns into Jernbane Allé on the municipal border with Vanløse. The street crosses Dalgas Boulevard and passes under the S-train network's Frederikssund radial. The modern Flintholm neighbourhood is located on the north side of the street and the Lindevang Park on its south side. The street is named after the Nobel Prize-winning physician Niels Ryberg Finsen.

== History ==
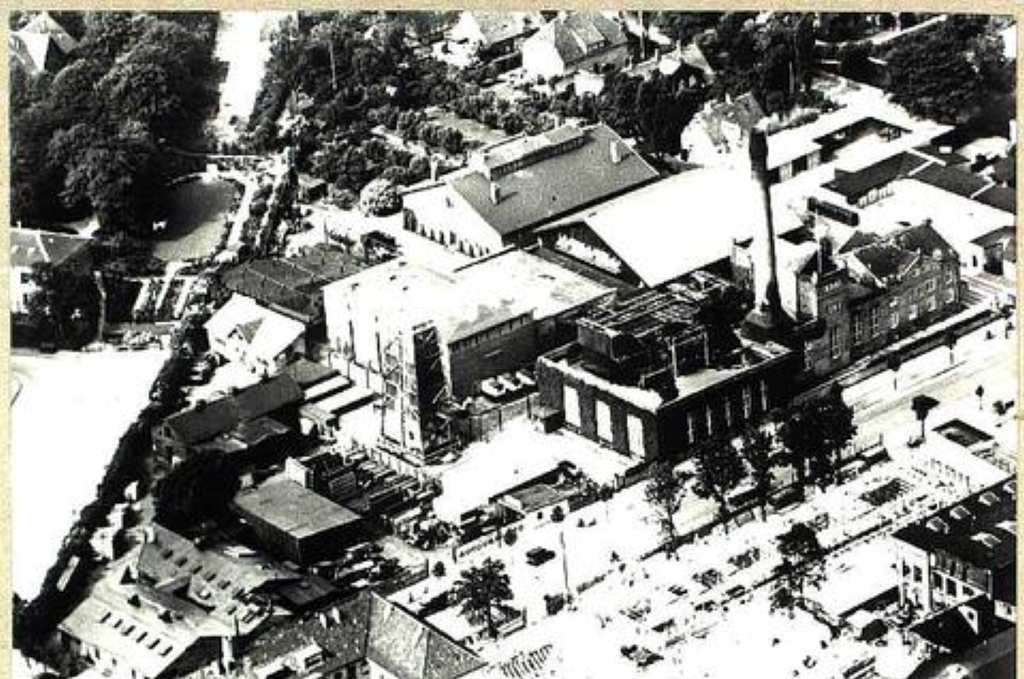
The Finsen Power Plant in the 1920s

Finsensvej was established in 1755 as part of a link between Frederiksberg and Bogholdergården in Vanløse. Finsensvej and present-day Howitzvej were collectively called Lampevej (Lamp Road) from about 1860. The name referred to one of the first outdoor street lamps in Copenhagen which was situated outside a midwife's practice to make it easier for customers to find their way ind the dark. The West Line towards Roskilde crossed Lampevej at Nordre Fasanvej from 1864 when Copenhagen Central Station was moved to a new location.

The road passed through open countryside until the late 19th century. Frederiksberg Brewery opened on the north side of the street in 1880 but closed when it merged with several other breweries under the name De Forenede Bryggerier (United Breweries) in 1991. In the 1890s, Frederiksberg Municipality acquired a large site on the north side of Lampevej, west of Nordre Fasanvej, which was designated for municipal utility and service functions. Frederiksberg Gasworks relocated to the site in 1898. It was joined by the Finsen Power Station (Finsensværket) in 1908. The two road sections, east and west of Nordre Fasanvej, received their new name on 1 January 1906. The railway crossing disappeared when the central station moved to its current location. Krystalværket, a plant producing ice for cooling, opened in the area in 1914 and Solbjerg Fairty established there in 1925. Frederiksberg Gasworks, Krystalværket, Finsen Power Station and Solbjerg Dairy all closed in the 1960s and most of their buildings were demolished.

== Notable buildings and residents ==
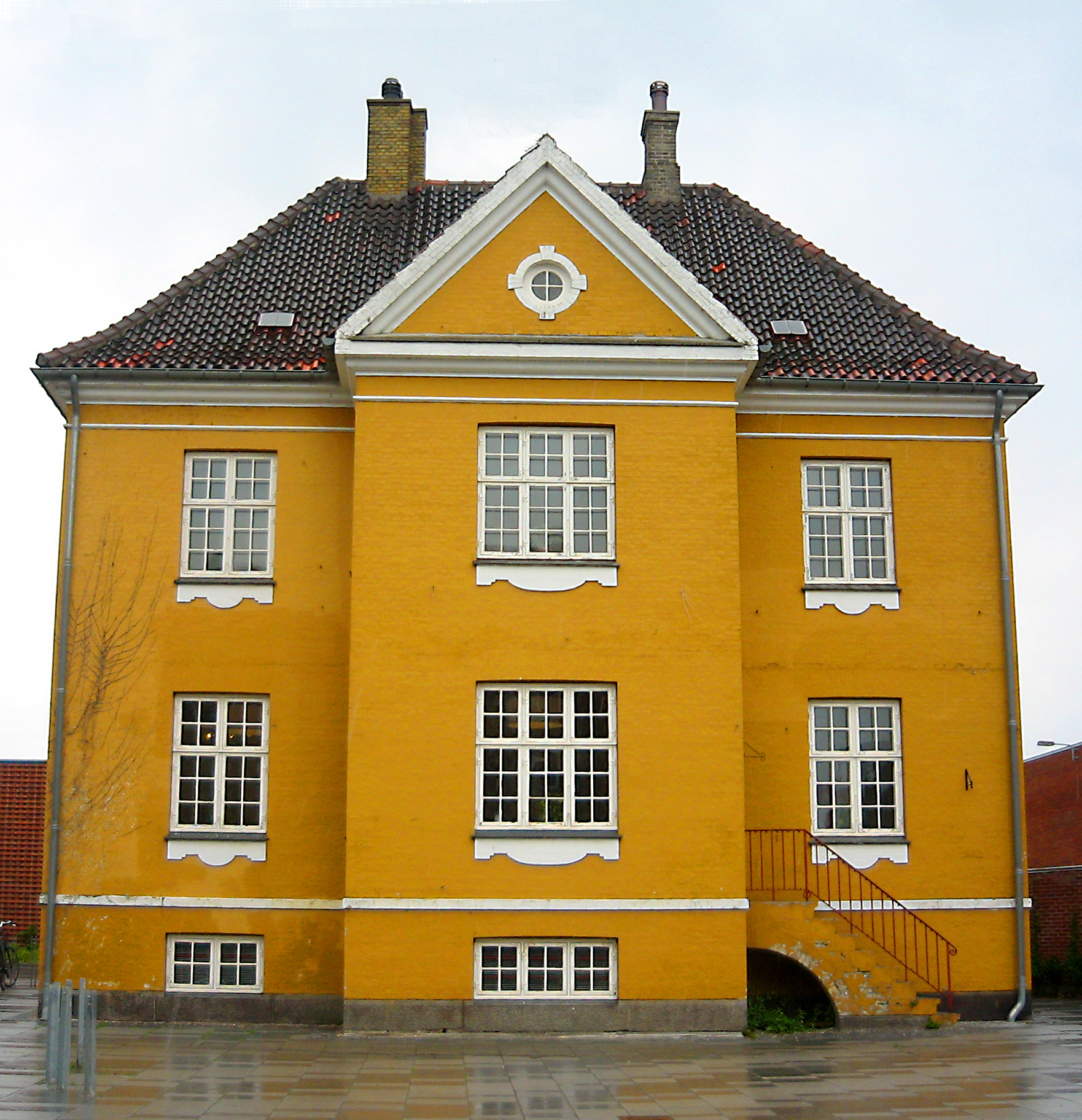
The Yellow House, now a cultural centre

Treledet (No. 61-71), a Functionalist apartment building from 1930–31 design by Palle Suenson and |Thorvald Dreyer, is one of the earliest examples of the bay window-balcony typology which would become emblematic of Danish residential architecture of the 1930s and 1940s.

A yellow building, Målerhuset, located on the eastern corner with Dirch Passers Allé, is the only surviving building from Frederiksberg Gasworks. Built in 1895, it is now known as the Yellow House (Den Hule Villa) and is now used as a local cultural centre. It was listed in 2003. The rest of the gasworks site has since 2004 been under redevelopment into a new mixed-use neighbourhood and is now called Flintholm.

The building society development Frederiksberg Kommunale Funktionærers Boligforening, also known as Frederiksberg Haveby or Ved Grænsen ("On the Border"), consisting of some one hundred single family detached homes and double houses were built by Frederiksberg kommunale Funktionærers Boligforening between 1914 and 1919. The architecture is strongly influenced by the Bedre Byggeskik, a Danish version of the Arts and Crafts movement.

== Transport ==
Fasanvej metro station is situated just south of Finsensvej's eastern end. The station is served by the M1 and M2 lines of the Copenhagen Metro. The western part of the street is located approximately midway between Flintholm Station to the north and Peter Bangs Vej station to the south, both of which are stations on the Frederikssund radial of the S-train system. Flintholm is also served by trains on the S-train system's Ring Line and the M1 and M2 metro lines. The street crosses the Ring 2 ring road just after turning into Jernbane Allé on the border to Vanløse.
