= Lindevangsparken =

Park in Frederiksberg Municipality, Denmark

Coordinates: 55.6807°N 12.5114°E

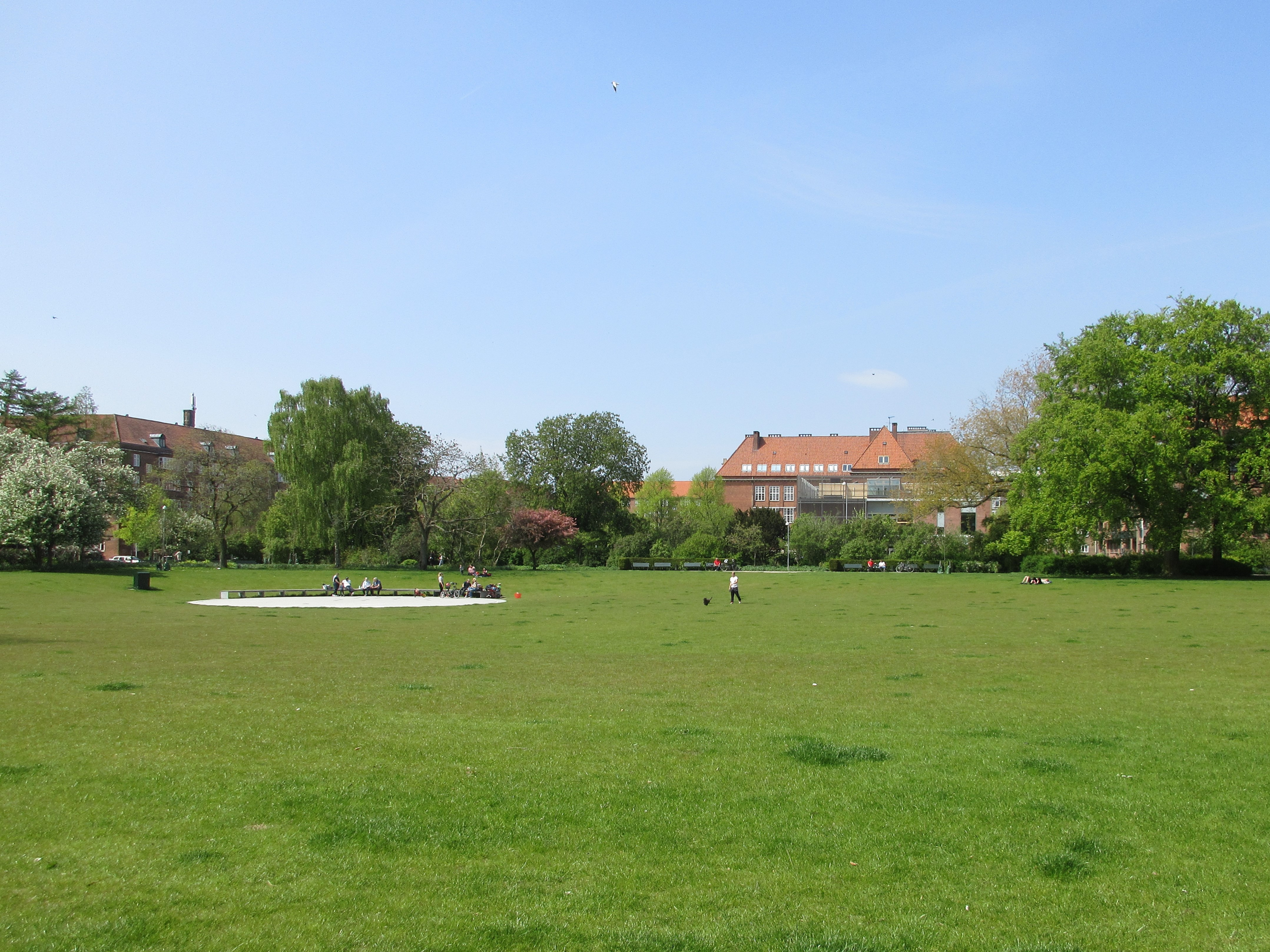
Lindevangsparken, 2017.

Lindevangsparken is a public park in the Frederiksberg district of Copenhagen Denmark. It is in the so-called Lindevang neighbourhood (Danish: Lindevangskvarteret) between Peter Bangs Vej to the south and Finsensvej to the north.. Established in 1932, it is the oldest municipal park in Frederiksberg and with its area of 33,000 square metres is also the largest. The much larger and older Frederiksberg Park and Søndermarken are both state-owned.

The park was protected by the Danish Conservation Authority (Fredningsnævnet) in 1960. Between 2014 and 2015 the park went through a Realdania-sponsored refurbishment which involves protection of the surrounding neighbourhood against flooding in connection with heavy rain. The new park was inaugurated on 18 November 2016.

== Playground ==
The playground was refurbished in 2009. In 2013 it was expanded with an electronically controlled water playground.
