= Lyset =

Housing development in Copenhagen, Denmark

Coordinates: 55.6622°N 12.5039°E

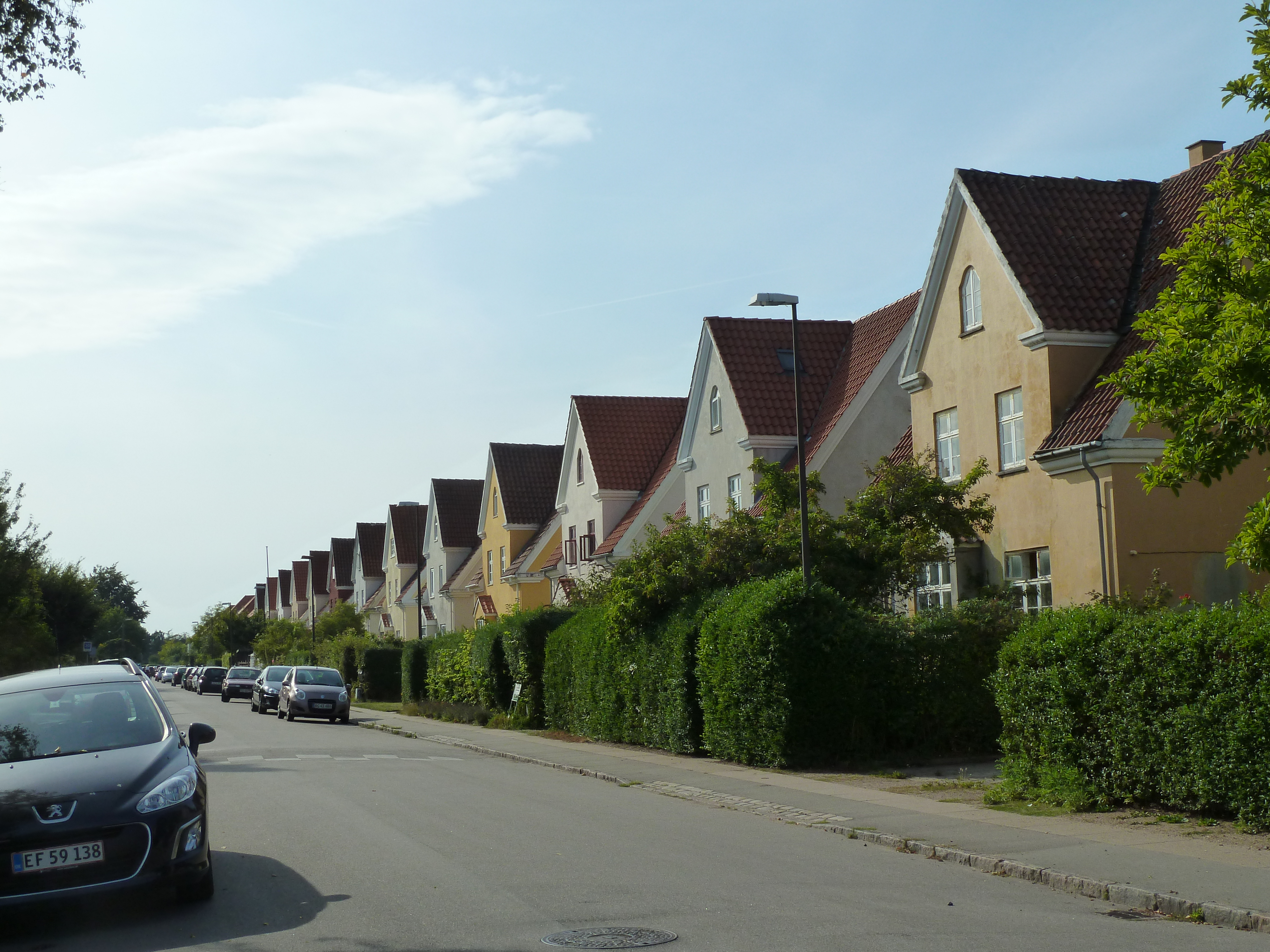
A row of houses at Carl Langes Vej

Lyset (English: "The Light") is an area of building society houses located on the north side of Vigerslev Allé in the Valby district of Copenhagen, Denmark. The development consists of 106 houses situated along Carl Langes vej, Steenbergsvej, Fengersvej, Eschrichtsvej and Steinsvej, just west of Valby station and south of the railway line towards Roskilde.

== History ==
The building society Lyset was founded on 24 September 1910 at the initiative of employees at Copenhagen's tramways to provide modern and healthy homes outside the dense inner city for the members. Since they were too few to lift the project, the society was also opened to employees as the national railways, the fire corps and the municipality. Over the next years each member made a deposit of DKK 2 every week to provide the necessary means for beginning construction. Then surrounded by farmland, the site was acquired from Copenhagen Municipality in 1910 and the foundation stone for the first house was set on 24 November that same year. The architect Heinrich Hansen had been charged with the design of the 106 houses. The last house was completed in 1914.

== See also ==
- White Houses, Frederiksberg
- Arbejdernes Byggeforening
