= Frederiksberg Kommunale Funktionærers Boligforening =

Coordinates: 55°41′01″N 12°29′52″E

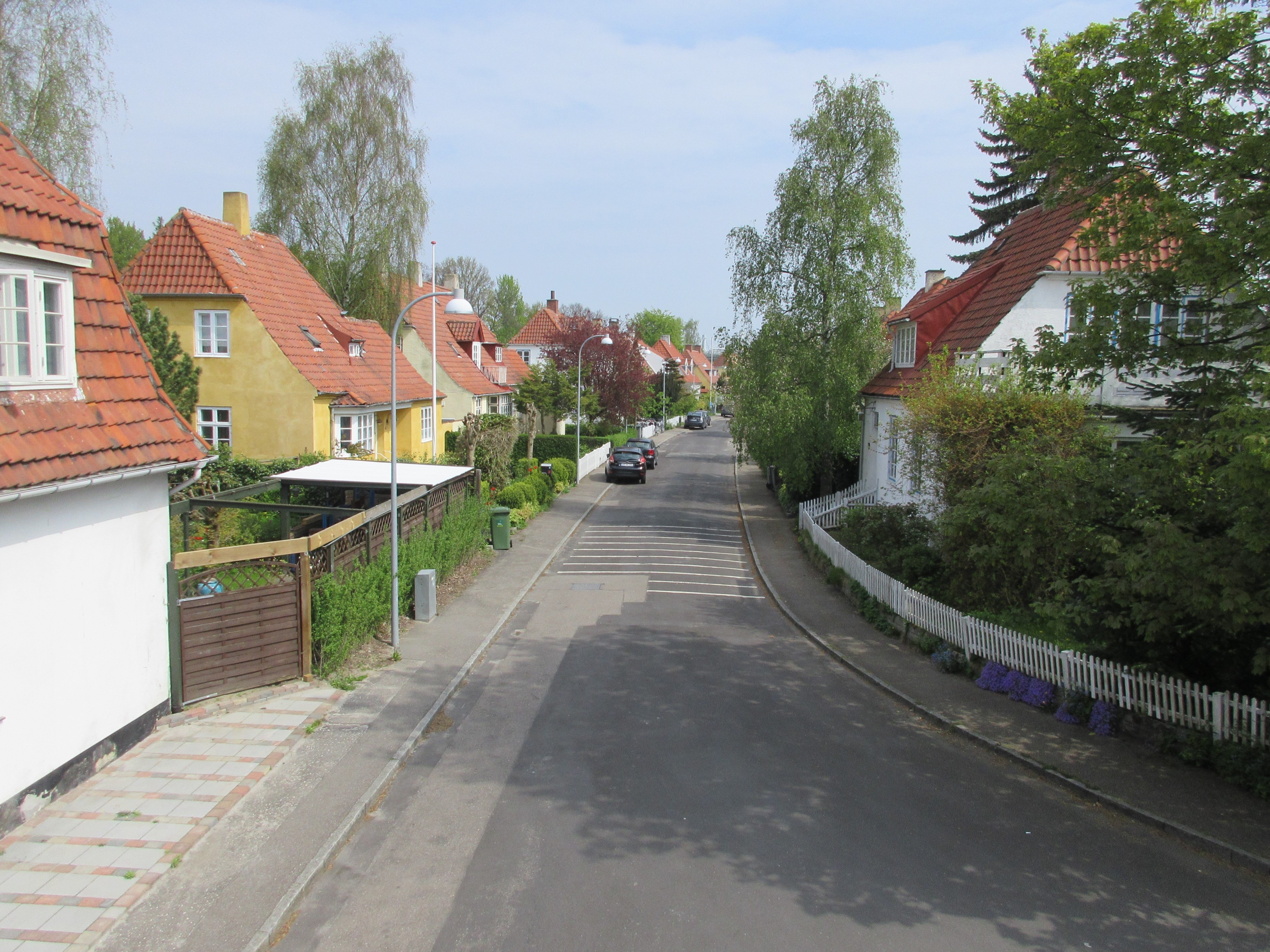
A row of houses at Carl Langes Vej

Frederiksberg Kommunale Funktionærers Boligforening (Frederiksberg Municipal Employee's Housing Association), also known as Frederiksberg Haveby (Frederiksberg Garden Town) or Ved Grænsen (literally "On the Border"), is an area of building society houses located off Finsensvej in Frederiksberg Municipality, Copenhagen, Denmark, on the border with Vanløse (hence the nickname).

== History ==
Frederiksberg Kommunale Funktionærers Boligforening was founded on 28 May 1913 by employees of Frederiksberg Municipality. Construction began in 1915 and was completed in 1919. On its completion the development contained a total of 220 residences: 36 double houses with four apartments in each, one triple house with six apartments and 35 single family detached homes.

== Today ==
The area now contains 110 homes. The architecture is strongly influenced by the Bedre Byggeskik, a Danish version of the Arts and Crafts movement.
