= K.B. Hallen =

- Interactive map of K.B. Hallen
- Address: Peter Bangs Vej 147; 2000 Copenhagen; Denmark
- Location: Frederiksberg
- Coordinates: 55°40′36″N 12°29′35″E
- Owner: Kjøbenhavns Boldklub
- Capacity: 4,500

Construction
- Opened: 22 April 1938
- Closed: 28 September 2011
- Reopened: 24 January 2019
- Demolished: 20 February 2015
- Cost: 235 million DKK
- Architect: Hans Hansen
- Structural engineer: Christen Ostenfeld

Website
- www.kbhallen.dk
- Building details

General information
- Inaugurated: 5 December 2018
- Renovated: 13 June 2017—2 December 2018

Renovating team
- Architect: Christensen & Co
- Engineer: Rambøll
- Structural engineer: Give Staalspaer
- Other designers: Marianne Levinsen Landskab; NBK Architectural; Zumtobel Group; m&r Manufaktur
- Main contractor: Einar Kornerup

K.B. Hallen is a multi-purpose arena located at Peter Bangs Vej in the Frederiksberg district of Copenhagen, Denmark. Originally, it was used primarily for badminton, tennis, basketball and volleyball, but also hosted other events, including dance tournaments and flea markets.

It was re-inaugurated on 5 December 2018, after the original building was damaged in a severe fire on 28 September 2011. The new arena has a capacity of 4,500 that can be expanded up to 4,950 for concerts.

The arena is famous for being the venue where The Beatles' played their only two concerts on Danish grounds on 4 June 1964, as well as performances by The Who, The Rolling Stones, Jimi Hendrix, Chuck Berry, and Bob Dylan, alongside numerous shows by Pink Floyd, Led Zeppelin, and Deep Purple.

== History ==
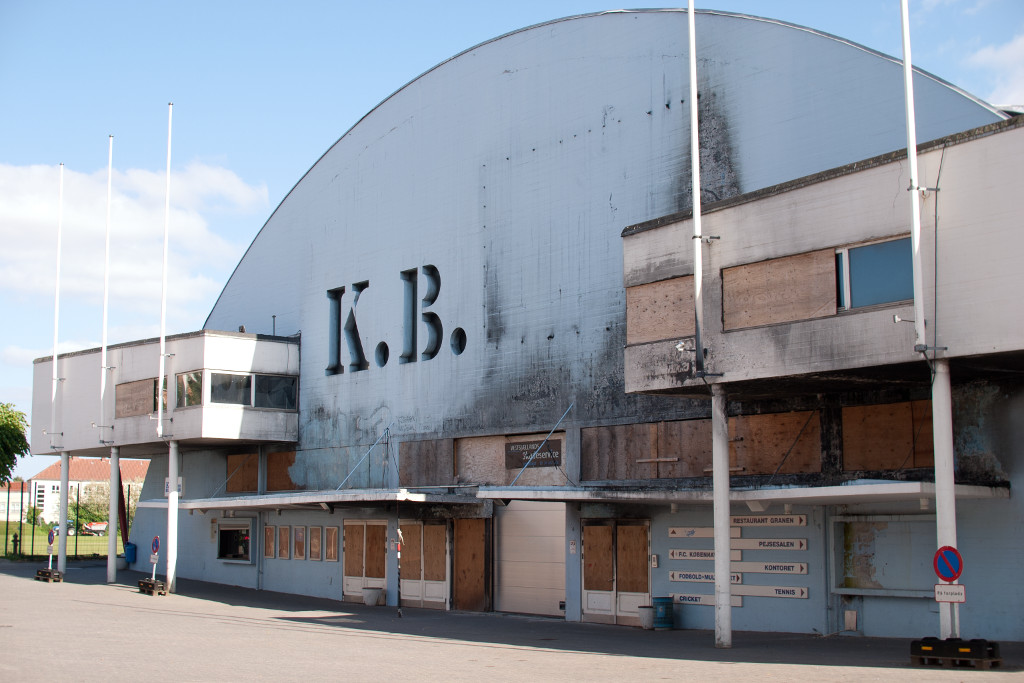
The venue in June 2013, closed and boarded up.

Kjøbenhavns Boldklub acquired the large site on the south side of Peter Bangs Vej in 1924. The arena was inaugurated in the presence of King Christian X on 22 April 1938. The architect was Hans Hansen and the chief engineer Christen Ostenfeld. Poul Henningsen designed special lighting and an adjacent ballroom called "Pejsesalen", where a large mural was painted.

Following Operation Safari and the scuttling of the Danish navy in 1943, most navy personnel were interned in the venue. In the summer of 1944, K.B. Hallen was subject to so-called schalburgtage when members of the Schalburg Corps placed a bomb in the hall, destroying most of the furniture and glasswork, but the building itself was left intact, rendering the arena closed for only half a year afterward.

In the 1940s and 1950s, a number of significant jazz artists played here, including Louis Armstrong, Duke Ellington, Count Basie, Miles Davis, Frank Sinatra, Billie Holiday and Dane Leo Mathisen. In 1947 comedians Laurel & Hardy performed as part of their Danish visit, and in 1950 Winston Churchill held a keynote speech and received the Order of the Elephant.

The decade of 1960 brought the British Invasion to Denmark, and The Beatles (1964), as well as The Who (1965), and The Rolling Stones (1966) all performed in K.B. Hallen during this era. Other notable musicians include Chuck Berry (1965) and Bob Dylan (1966). In the 1970s K.B. Hallen hosted concerts by Jimi Hendrix, Led Zeppelin, Deep Purple (who played a record 12 times in K.B. Hallen throughout its history), Pink Floyd, Eric Clapton, Simon & Garfunkel, Black Sabbath, The Band, and Johnny Cash, but in the 1980s the number of concerts declined due to increased competition from Brøndby Hallen and especially Valby-Hallen.

During the 1990s, there were again used for a number of prolific artists, including Radiohead, Oasis, Green Day, Beastie Boys, Björk, Backstreet Boys, and Robbie Williams.

In the new millennium Danish bands began performing for to bigger crowds, and both Nephew and Dizzy Mizz Lizzy played multiple concerts in K.B. Hallen in the year of 2010, whilst international artists such as Rammstein, Foo Fighters, The Strokes, Kraftwerk, Black Eyed Peas, Michael Bublé, Arcade Fire, Morrissey, Katy Perry, and Lady Gaga performed up until the fire in 2011.

== Fire ==
On 28 September 2011, the arena was destroyed in a major fire. Initial suspicions linked the fire to a food kiosk in the lobby of the building, or to an electrical lighting fault. The fault later turned out to be because of heated cardboard being located too close to a halogen light.

== Renovation ==
After the fire, it was decided to construct a new K.B. Hallen to a design inspired by the old building, with architectural firm Christensen & Co leading the project. Demolition started on 20 February 2015, with expected completion of the new building in 2018, and reopening to the public in January 2019. The opening event was on 24 January 2019. A number of international artists were soon confirmed to be performing in the "new" K.B. Hallen, including Take That and Eros Ramazzotti as well as Danish acts such as Nephew and Benal.

== See also ==
- List of indoor arenas in Denmark
- List of indoor arenas in Nordic countries
