= Michael Christensen (architect) =

Danish architect

Michael Christensen (born 1960) is a Danish architect, founder and head architect of Christensen & Co.

== Biography ==
Michael Christensen was born in 1960. He graduated from the Aarhus School of Architecture in 1989. After working briefly at 3XN he joined Henning Larsen Architects, from 2001 to 2006 as partner and the firm's artistic director. At Henning Larsen Architects he was the leading designer of buildings such as the IT University of Copenhagen and the Copenhagen headquarters of Nordea. In 2006 he formed Christensen & Co.

== Selected projects ==
=== With Henning Larsen Architects ===
- Christiansbro masterplan, Christianshavn, Copenhagen
- Nordea headquarters, Copenhagen (1996)
- Max Planck Institut für Demografische Forschung, Rostock, Germany (1999)
- IT University of Copenhagen, Copenhagen (2004)
- Reykjavík University extension, Reykjavík, Iceland (u/c)
- The Wave Residences, Vejle, Denmark (2009)

=== With Christensen & Co ===
- New campus building, Royal Institute of Technology, Stockholm, Sweden (u/c, competition win 2006)
- Faculty building, University of Copenhagen, Copenhagen (completed 2009)
- Research and educational centre, Karolinska Institute, Stockholm (competition win, completion 2011)
- Sustainable masterplan, Almere, the Netherlands
- National Danish Museum of Roads and Bridges, Holbær
- City Hall, Lund, Sweden
- Research and educational building, Technical University of Denmark, Copenhagen (competition win 2010)
