= Flintholm =

Modern neighbourhood in Frederiksberg district, Copenhagen, Denmark

Coordinates: 55.6853°N 12.4989°E

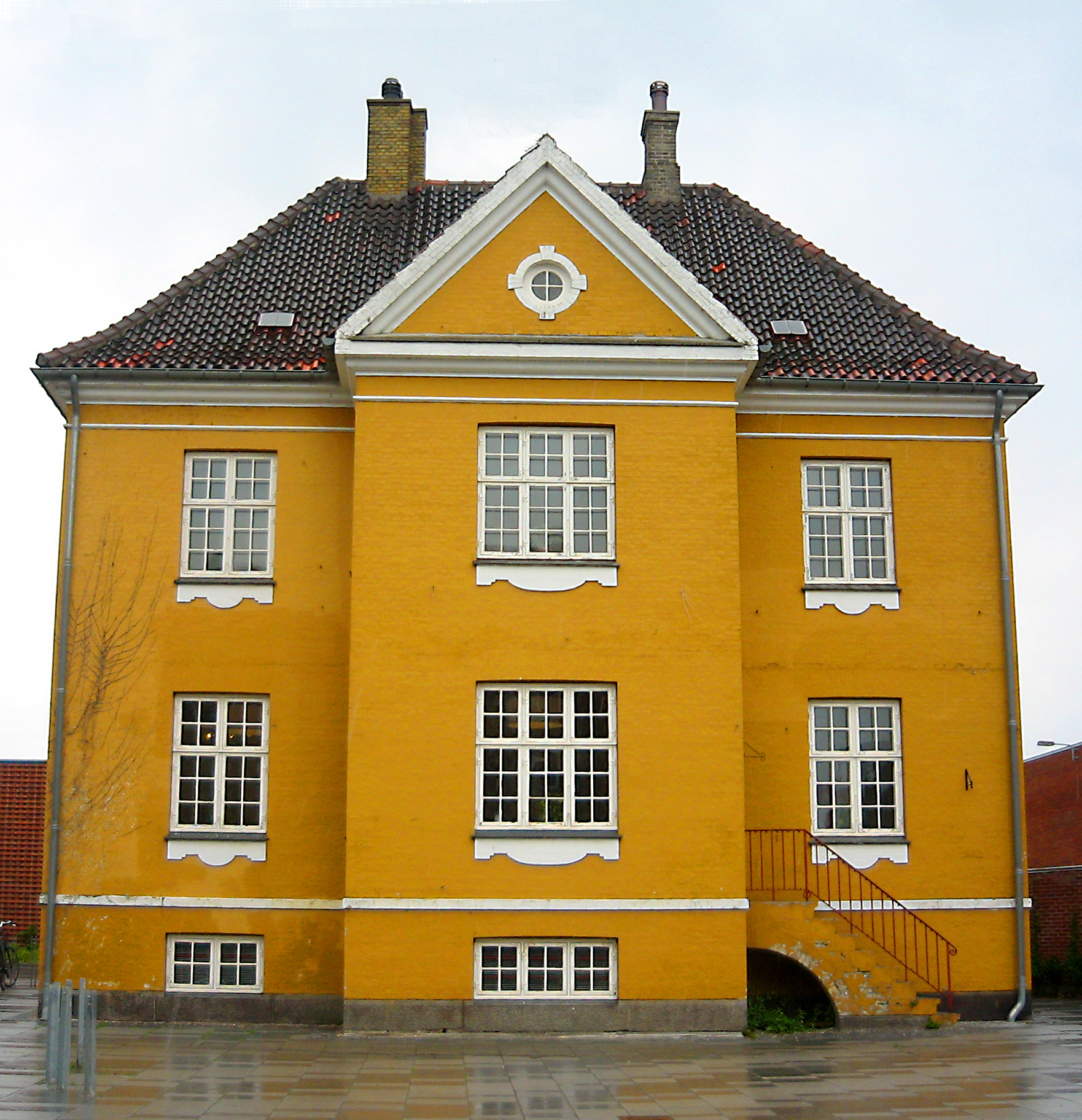
The Yellow House, now a cultural centre

Flintholm is a modern neighbourhood in the Frederiksberg district of Copenhagen, Denmark. Located just south of Flintholm station, on the border with Vanløse, it is the result of a redevelopment of a former gasworks site which began in 2004 and is still ongoing. The neighborhood covers an area of about 10 hectares and consists of a mixture of housing, offices, retail and several minor green spaces. The only surviving building from the gasworks, The Yellow Villa, now serves as a local cultural centre.

== History ==
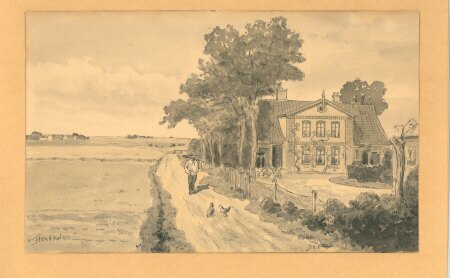
Flintholm in about 1900

Flintholm takes its name from an estate founded when a large area of farmland, which had then belonged to Ladegården, a farm under Copenhagen Castle, was auctioned off in lots in 1765. It was named after Jacob Nielsen Flindt, a farmer, who acquired the property in the 1790s. In 1827, most of the land was sold off to a neighbouring estate, Grøndal, while the house, including a small wood and a garden, was sold to H. J. Grove, a post officer, who used it as a summer retreat.

The area remained open countryside until the 1890s, when it was acquired by the City and designated for municipal utility and service functions. Frederiksberg's second gasworks opened at 76 Finsensvej in 1895 and was joined in 1908 by Finsen Power Station down the road.

Flintholm House was adapted for use as an infectious disease hospital. It comprised 12 beds in the house and 40 beds in two tent wings. It was in use in 1917, when Frederiksberg was hit by an outbreak of scarlet fever, and again a few years later during an outbreak of smallpox.

Up through the century, Frederiksberg Gasworks saw several expansions, especially after World War II, before it was closed down in 1964.

== Redevelopment ==
In 2001, prompted by the opening of Flintholm station, Frederiksberg Municipality, in collaboration with DSB and private investors, decided to develop a masterplan for redevelopment of the area into a new mixed-use neighbourhood.

The new streets and spaces that were created were mostly named for Danish revue artists, such as Preben Kaas, Dirch Passer, Elga Olga, Kjeld Petersen, Marguerite Viby and Stig Lommer. The area is therefore also known as Revykvarteret, literally "The Revue Quarter."

== Notable buildings and residents ==
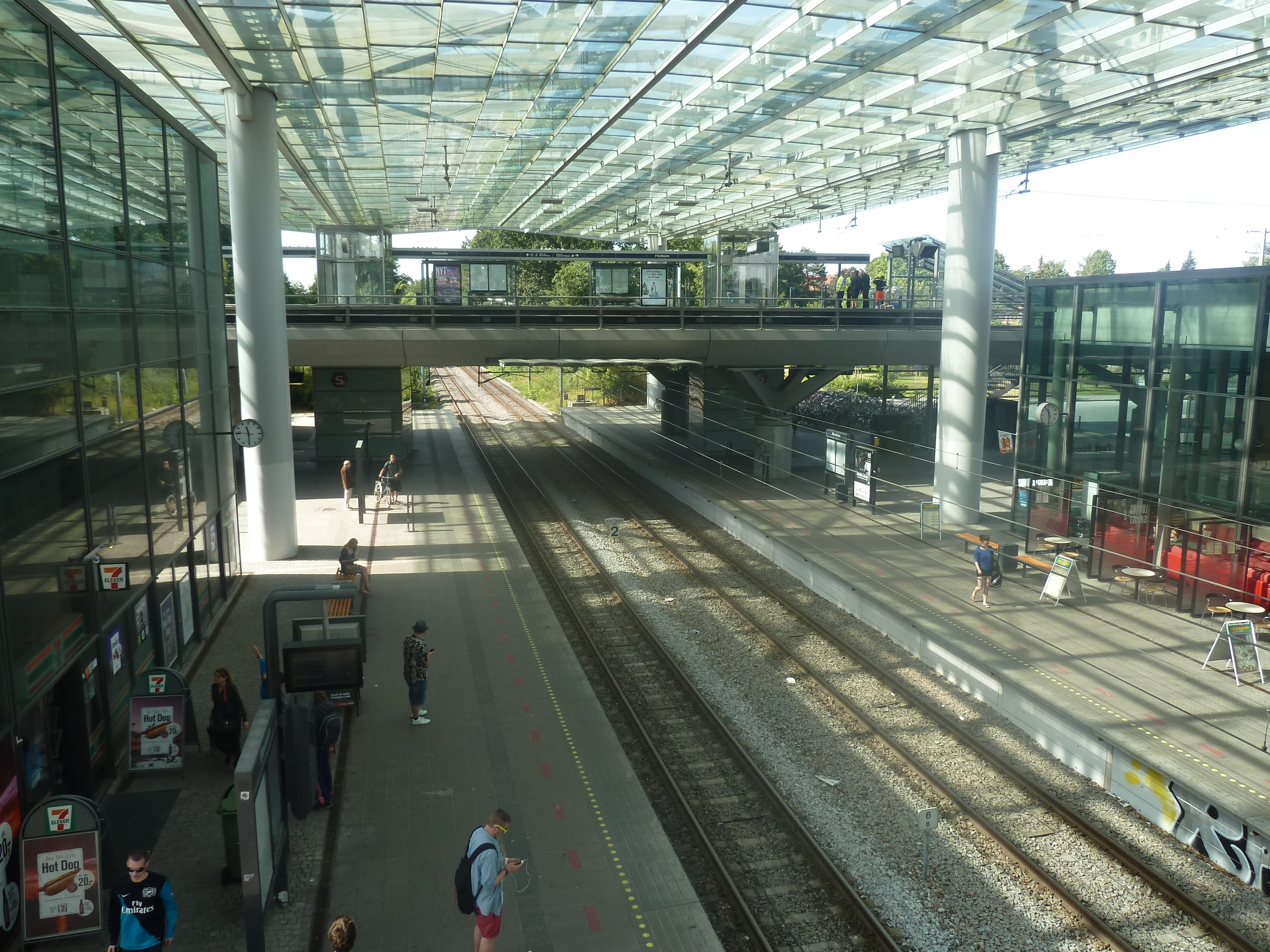
Flintholm station

The only surviving gasworks building is the Yellow House (Den Gule Villa), which was listed in 2003 and is now used as a local cultural centre. Flintholm Church is not located within the area but further south at Peter Bangs Vej.

NCC's Flintholm Company House was designed by Vilhelm Lauritzen Architects and is located next to Flintholm Station. It contains 21,000 square metres of office space and 3m000 square metres for retail and cafés. KPMG inaugurated their new Danish head office in the area in 2011. Their building was designed by 3XN and has room for 1,700 employees.

== Transport ==
Flintholm station is an important hub for transport, serving both the Frederikssund and Ringlines of the S-train network and the M1 and M2 lines of the Copenhagen Metro.

== See also ==
White Houses, Frederiksberg
