= Dalgas Boulevard =

Avenue in Copenhagen, Denmark

Allégade
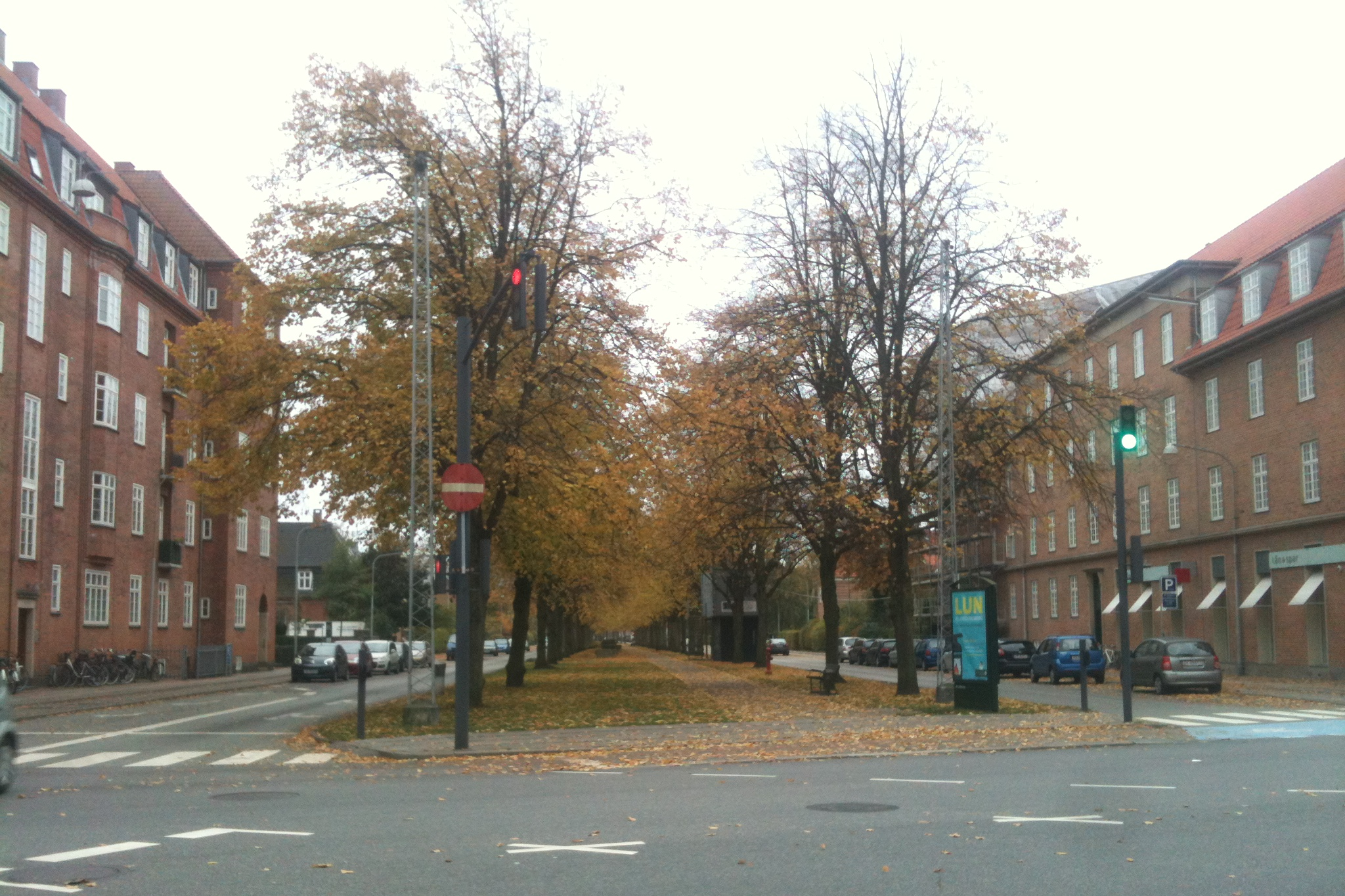
- Length: 393 m (1,289 ft)
- Location: Frederiksberg, Copenhagen, Denmark
- Postal code: 2000
- Coordinates: 55°40′59.93″N 12°30′43.26″E
- South end: Roskildevej
- Major junctions: Peter Bangs Vej
- North end: Femte Juni Plads

Dalgas Boulevard is a broad avenue in the Frederiksberg district of Copenhagen, Denmark. It runs from Roskildevej in the south to Femte Juni Plads in the north, intersecting Peter Bangs Vej and Finsensvej on the way.

== History ==
The road was planned and it was already at this point decided to name it after the officer and road engineer Enrico Dalgas. Construction did not start until 1911.

== Notable buildings and structures ==
Dalgas Have is one of several campuses of Copenhagen Business School in Frederiksberg. It is from 1889 and was designed by Henning Larsen Architects.

Much of the southern part of the street is lined by single family detached homes. No. 45 was designed by Kaj Gottlob.

== Public art ==
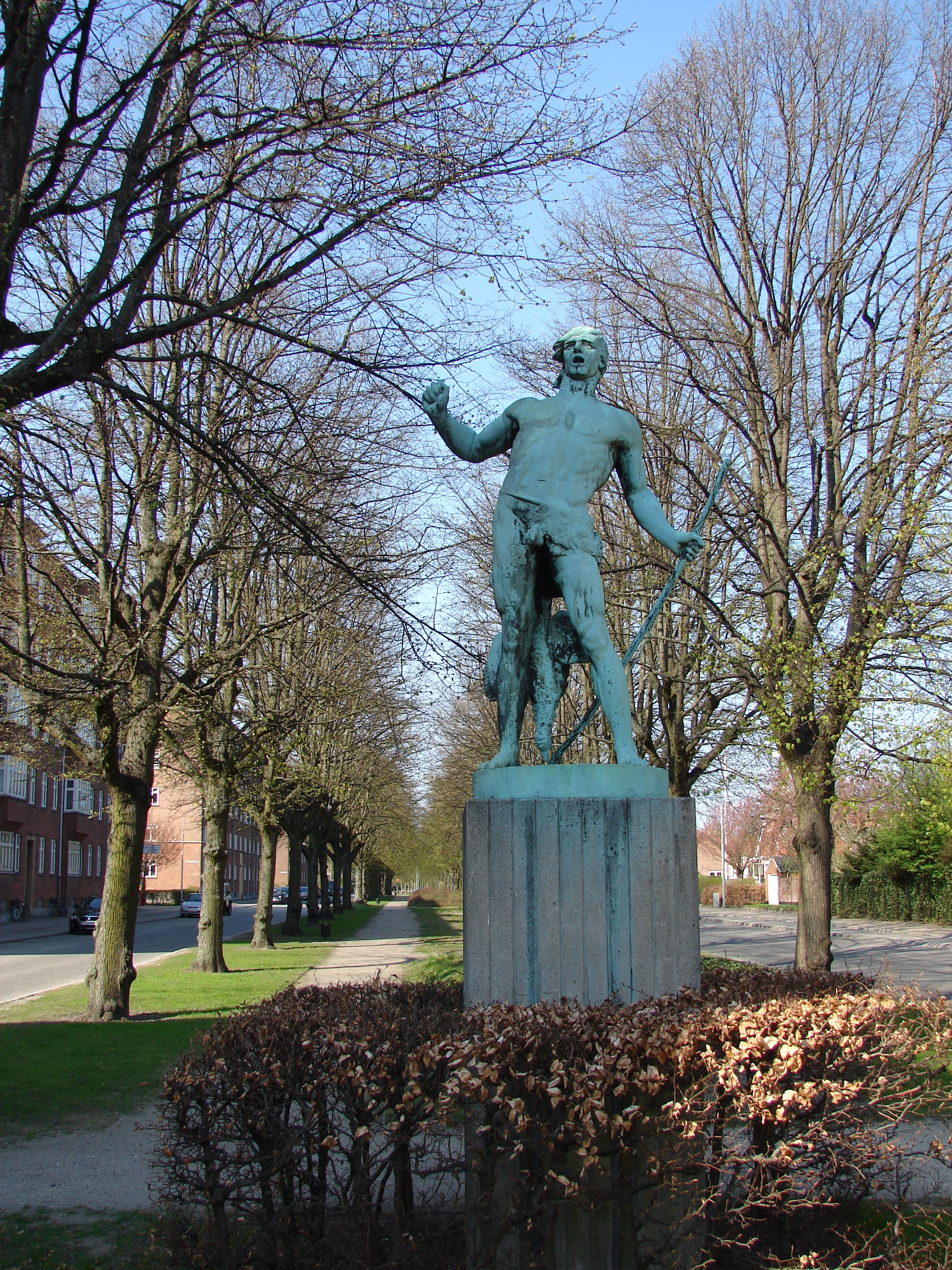
The statue Ancient Hunter by Johannes Bjerg

In the central reservation, close to the southern end of the street, stands a bronze cast of Aksel Hansen's sculpture Ancient Hunter. In Borgmester Godskesens Plads, a small greenspace off the west side of the street, stands Johannes Bjerg's statue Dance from 1916.

== In popular culture ==
- The house at no. 48 has been used as a location in several films and television series, including Manden med de gyldne ører and Klovn.
- The fictional journalist and senior correspondent Kirsten Birgit Schiøtz Kretz Hørsholm in the satirical Radio24syv programme Den Korte Radioavis (The Short Radio News) lives in 48 Dalgas Boulevard.
