= Peter Bangs Vej railway station =

Commuter railway station in Copenhagen, Denmark

Peter Bangs Vej
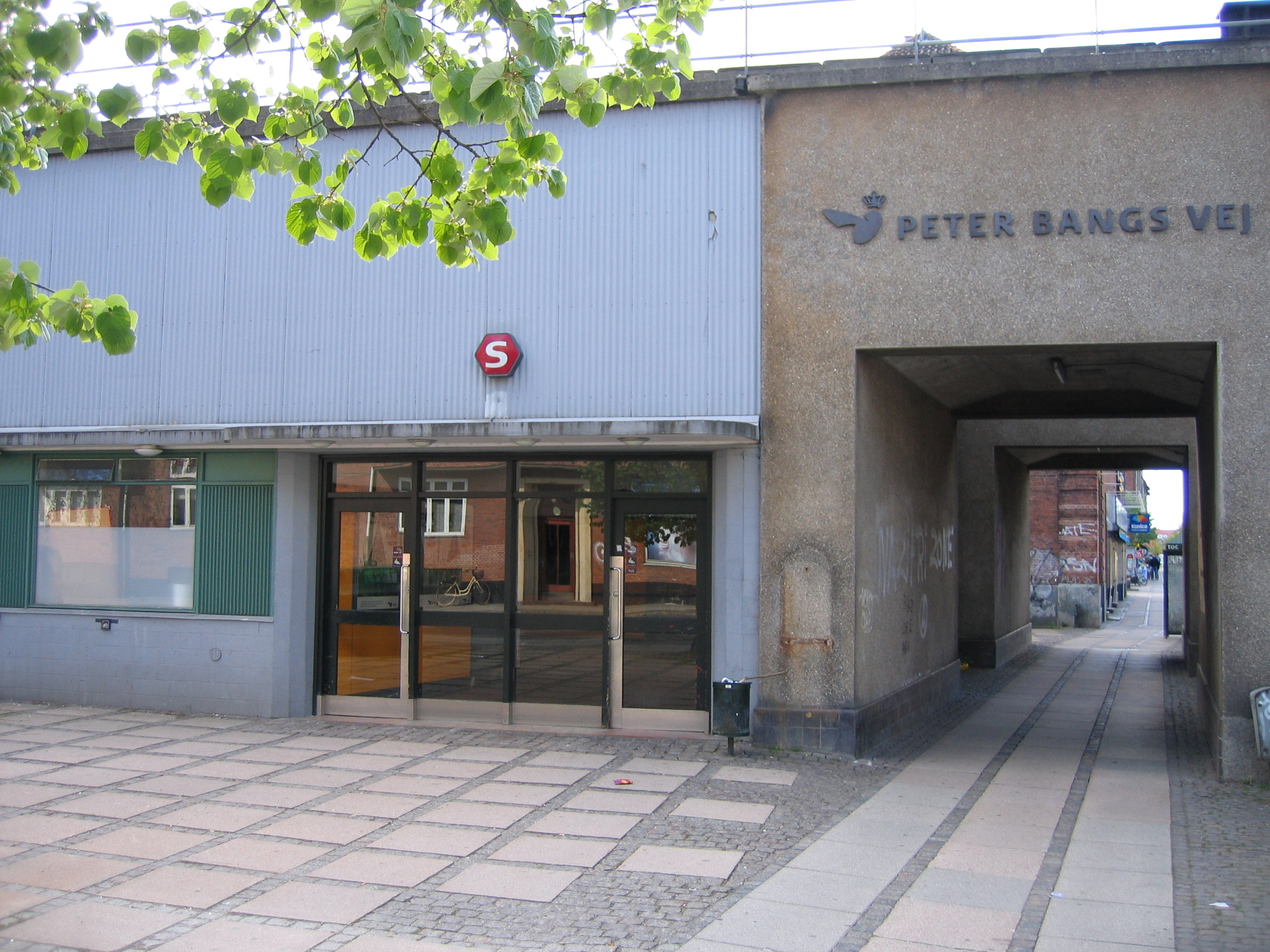
- Peter Bangs Vej station in 2007

General information
- Location: Glahns Allé 2; 2000 Frederiksberg; Frederiksberg Municipality; Denmark
- Coordinates: 55°40′41″N 12°30′13″E
- Elevation: 15.0 metres (49.2 ft)
- Owner: DSB (station infrastructure); Banedanmark (rail infrastructure)
- Platforms: Island platform
- Tracks: 2
- Train operators: DSB
- Bus routes: 9A, 72

Construction
- Structure type: Elevated
- Accessible: Yes
- Architect: Knud Tanggaard Seest

Other information
- Fare zone: 2

History
- Opened: 23 September 1941; 85 years ago

Services
Preceding station	S-train	Following station
Langgade towards Østerport	H Mon–Fri	Flintholm towards Ballerup
Langgade towards Klampenborg	C Sat–Sun	Flintholm towards Frederikssund
Location

Peter Bangs Vej station is an S-train railway station serving the western part of the district of Frederiksberg in Copenhagen, Denmark. The station is located on the Frederikssund radial of Copenhagen's S-train network. The station, located where the railway line crosses the street Peter Bangs Vej, was designed by the Danish State Railways architect Knud Tanggaard Seest and opened on 23 September 1941.

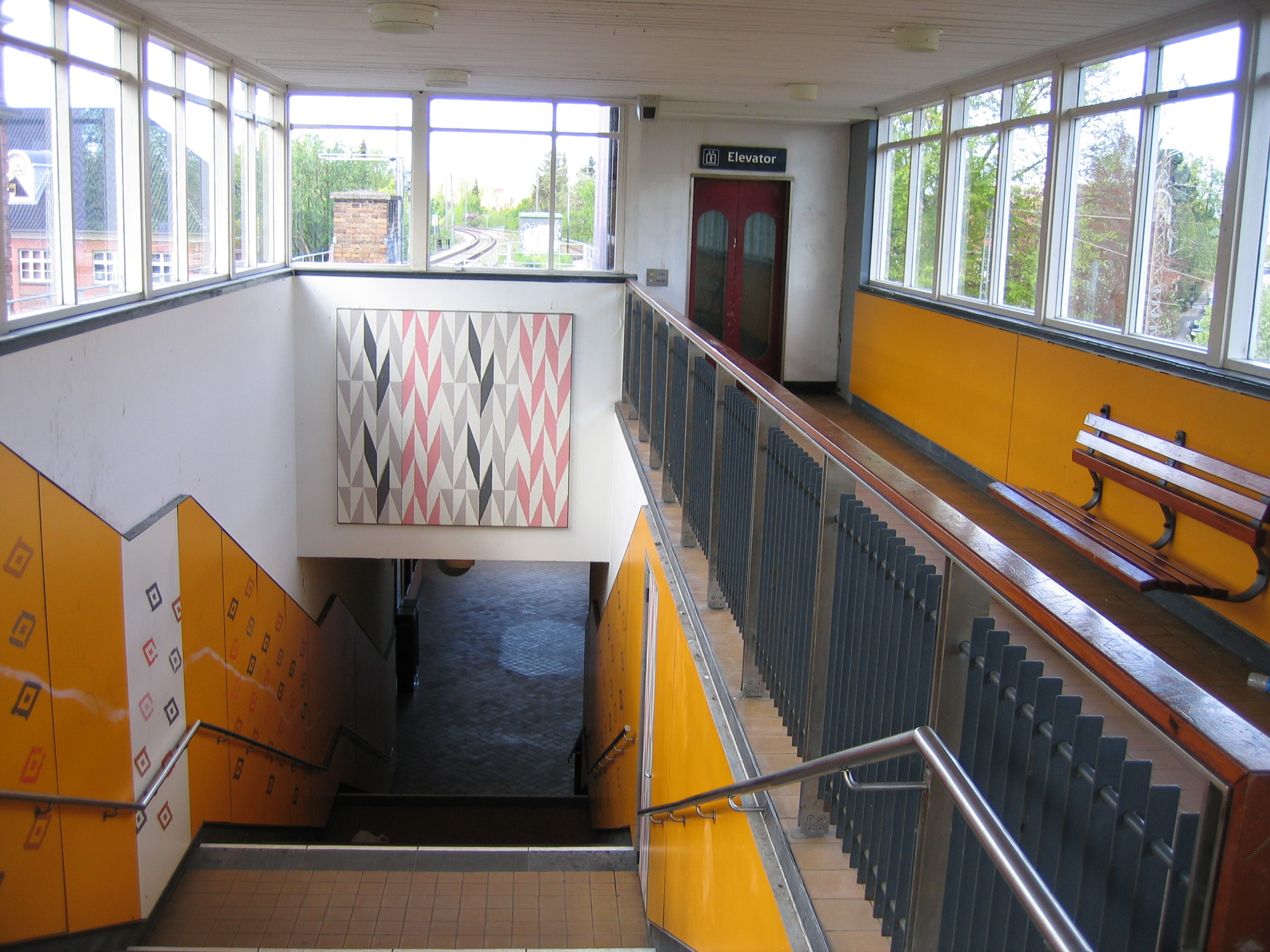
Lift/elevator and stairs from street level

== See also ==
- List of Copenhagen S-train stations
- List of railway stations in Denmark
