= Christensen & Co =

Danish architectural firm

Practice information
- Key architects: Michael Christensen (founding partner); Vibeke Lydolph Lindblad (CEO) Mikkel Hermann Sørensen Thomas Nørgaard
- Founded: 2006
- Location: Copenhagen

Significant works and honors
- Buildings: Several Buildings at the Technical University of Denmark: B324, B202, B127, B128, B129, B130, B310, B357, B112, B313, B330 K.B. Hallen, Niels Bohr Building

Christensen & Co (CCO) is an architectural firm based in Copenhagen, Denmark. It was founded in 2006 by Michael Christensen and is particularly known for its work in sustainable architecture, often in the educational sector.

== History ==
Christensen & Co was established in 2006 by architect Michael Christensen. CCO quickly won its first competition for designing a campus for the Royal Institute of Technology in Stockholm, Sweden. The winning entry had an ambitious environmental profile with energy consumption at a third of what was considered normal in similar buildings at the time. Since then, the firm has won several international architectural competitions, including a 70,000 m^{2} research and educational centre at the Karolinska Institute in southern Stockholm (2008), a sustainable masterplan for a new district in the Dutch city Almere (2009), and a new city hall in Lund, Sweden (2010). Christensen & Co has also designed Denmark's first public CO_{2}-neutral building, a faculty building designed for the Faculty of Science at the University of Copenhagen.

CCO specialises in creating learning environments, research facilities, pharma, cultural venues, sports facilities, and interior design projects. They have completed various projects across Scandinavia, Europe, and North America, including new constructions, renovations, and transformations. Notably, CCO has designed 19 specialised buildings for the Danish Technical University.

The studio assists public clients and private companies translate visions and desires into new physical spaces of high architectural quality. CCO works with all phases of construction from initial sketches and clarification to the final delivery of the construction, including interior design, special furnishings, and wayfinding.

CCO works based on research and analysis, in an interdisciplinary process where honed skills are combined with valuable input from clients and users. The approach is analytical and ensures a unique integrated solution in each project.

== Organisation ==
In 2016, Vibeke Lydolph Lindblad, Michael Werin Larsen, Mikkel Hermann Sørensen og Thomas Nørgaard joined Michael Christensen as partners of Christensen & Co. Vibeke Lydolph Lindblad was appointed to CEO while Michael Christensen continued to hold the position as creative director. Marie Partoft joined the partner group in 2023. The partner group collectively leads the office.

In 2024, Michael handed over his responsibilities to the rest of the partner group to pursue a new direction within architecture.

Since 2006 Christensen & Co. continues to challenge conventional thinking and has received international recognition and awards.

== Selected projects ==
- Center for Large Structure Production, University of Southern Denmark, Odense, Denmark.
- Odsherred Theater, Odsherred, Denmark.
- Culture & Community House, Høje-Taastrup, Denmark.
- Implement Consulting Group, Copenhagen, Denmark.
- Learning Centre interior, Høje-Taastrup, Denmark.
- Nærheden Learning Center, Høje-Taastrup, Denmark.
- Student Housing University of Toronto, University of Toronto Mississauga, Toronto, Canada
- DTU B116, Technical University of Denmark, Lyngby, Denmark.
- COSMOS Culture House & Library, Viby, Denmark.
- DTU Life Science & Bioengineering B202, Technical University of Denmark, Lyngby, Denmark.
- K.B. Hall, K.B. Hallen, Copenhagen, Denmark.
- Finansforbundet, Copenhagen, Denmark.
- Niels Bohr Building, Copenhagen, Denmark.
- Nordøstamager School, Copenhagen, Denmark.
- DTU Compute B324, Lyngby, Denmark.
- Forsyning Helsingør, Helsingør, Denmark.
- Ravnebakke School, Nye, Århus.
- DFDS, Copenhagen, Denmark.
