= White Houses, Frederiksberg =

Coordinates: 55.6776°N 12.5125°E

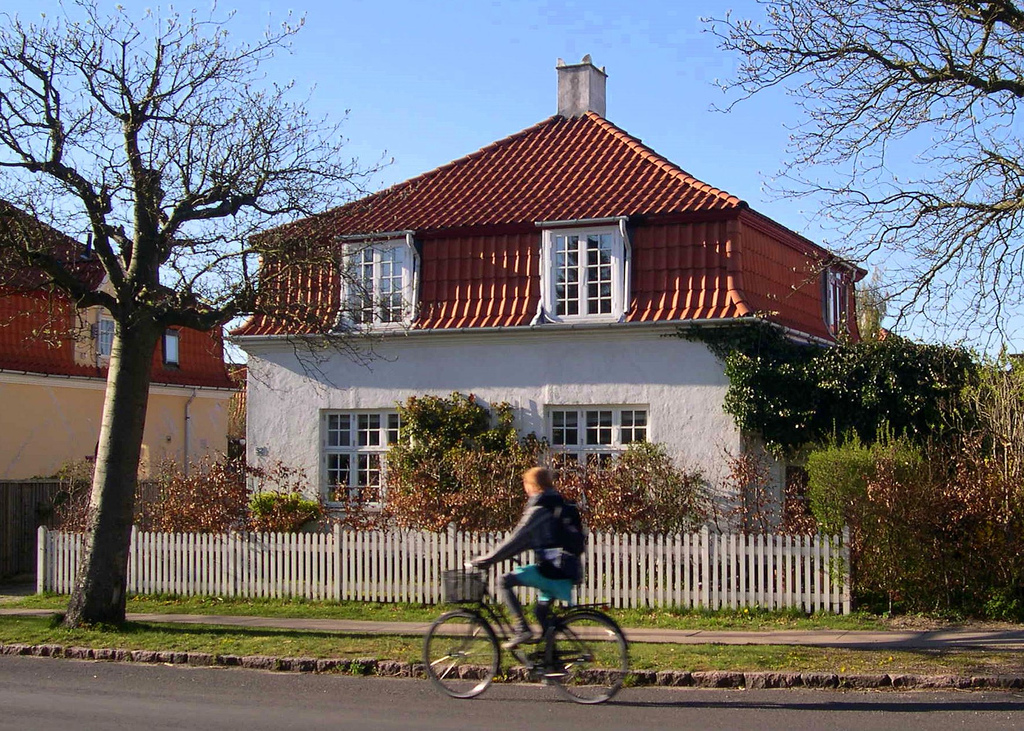
White Houses in Frederiksberg

The White Houses (Danish: Den Hvide By) in the Frederiksberg district of Copenhagen, Denmark, are a building society development originally built for workers at Frederiksberg Gasworks. It is located at Peter Bangs Vej, near Frederiksberg Gardens.

== History ==
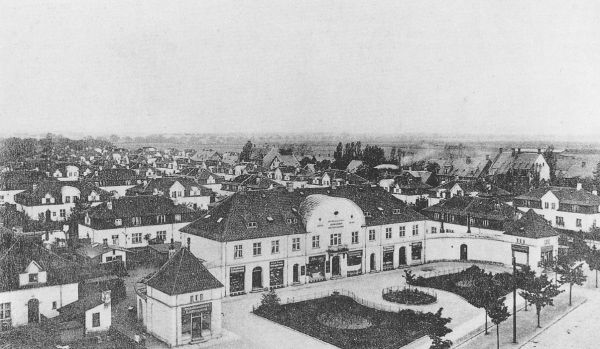
The White Houses in c. 1903

The first gasworks in Frederiksberg opened in 1860 and was located at H. C. Ørsteds Vej. When the installation of gas in private homes became common in the 1890s, it was decided to build a new plant at Flintholm, which opened in 1895. It was located in rural surroundings a few kilometres outside town and with no public transport available, it prompted a wish for new residences for its workers, located closer to their new workplace. Frederiksberg Gasworks Workers' Building Society (Danish: Frederiksberg Gasværks Arbejder Byggeforening) was founded in 1898 after an act adopted earlier that year provided for state loans for the construction of workers housing. The building society acquired a 4.5-hectare (11-acre) site at Peter Bangs Vej, just under one kilometre from Frederiksberg Gasworks. The architects Gotfred Tvede and Olaf Schmidth were charged with the design of the houses which were built in 1899 and 1900. The development contained 194 dwellings as well as a building with retail space.

Frederiksberg Workers' Building Society was dissolved in 1922 when the apartments were converted into private ownership (ejerboliger).

== Architecture ==
The development consists of 45 semi-detached houses and seven detached houses. The design is based on a cubic volume where the length, width and height of roof ridge all measure 8.46 m (9 units of 1⅓ ells). The semi-detached houses consist of two cubes put together. Gotfred Tvede and Olaf Schmidth created seven different designs for variation.

The buildings are designed in a Neo-Baroque style locally known as palæstil, inspired by 18th-century Rococo mansions, which was popular in Denmark at the time. Common features are white-dressed facades, Mansard roofs with red tiles, gable dormers and small paned windows.

== Today ==
The house owners are now organized in Vejlauget FAB. The houses are located on Peter Bangs Vej, Jyllandsvej, Kronprinsensvej, Folkets Allé, Frihedsvej, Lighedsvej and Broderskabsvej.

== Notable residents ==
- Ida Auken, politician

== Image gallery ==
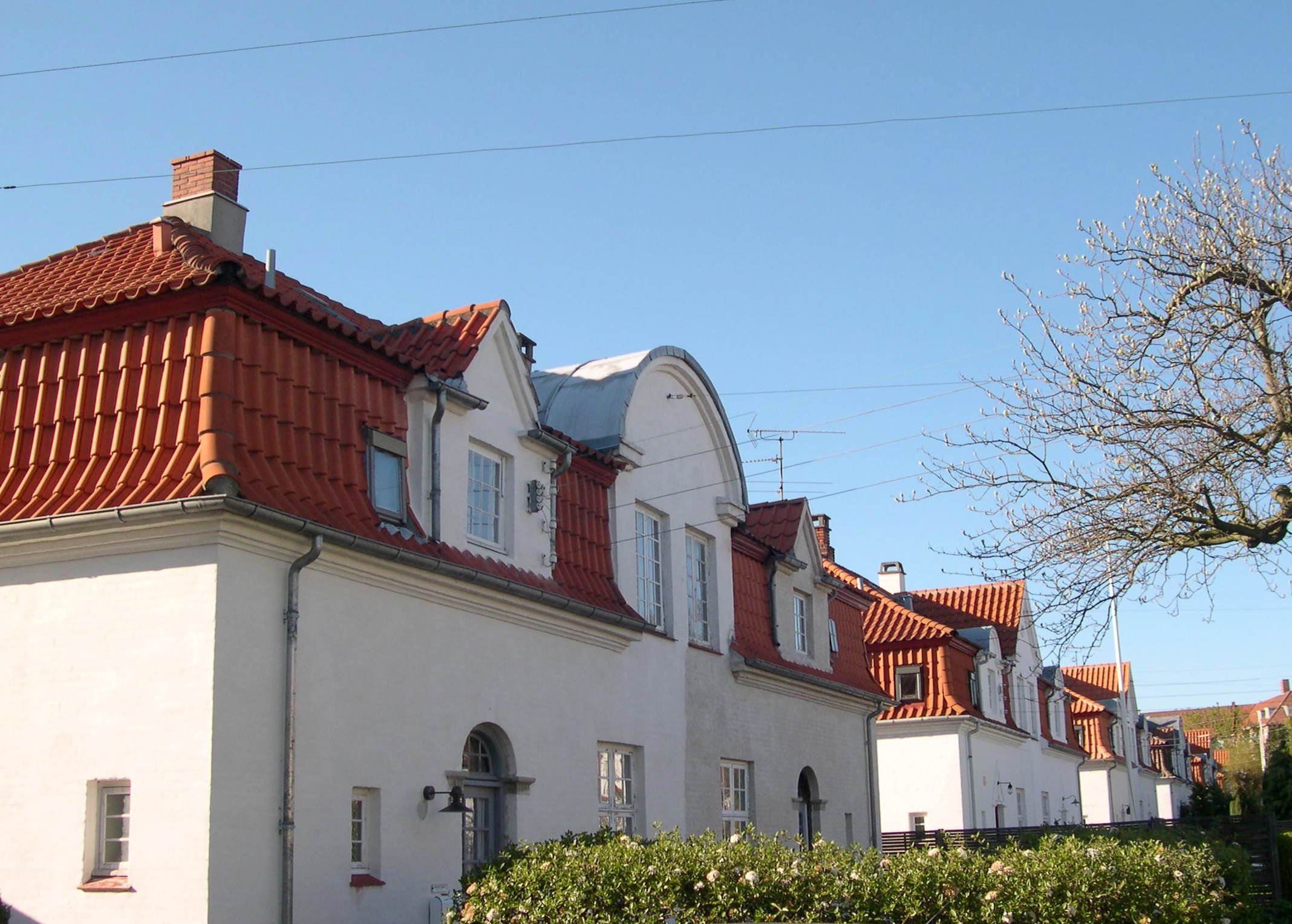
Roof detail

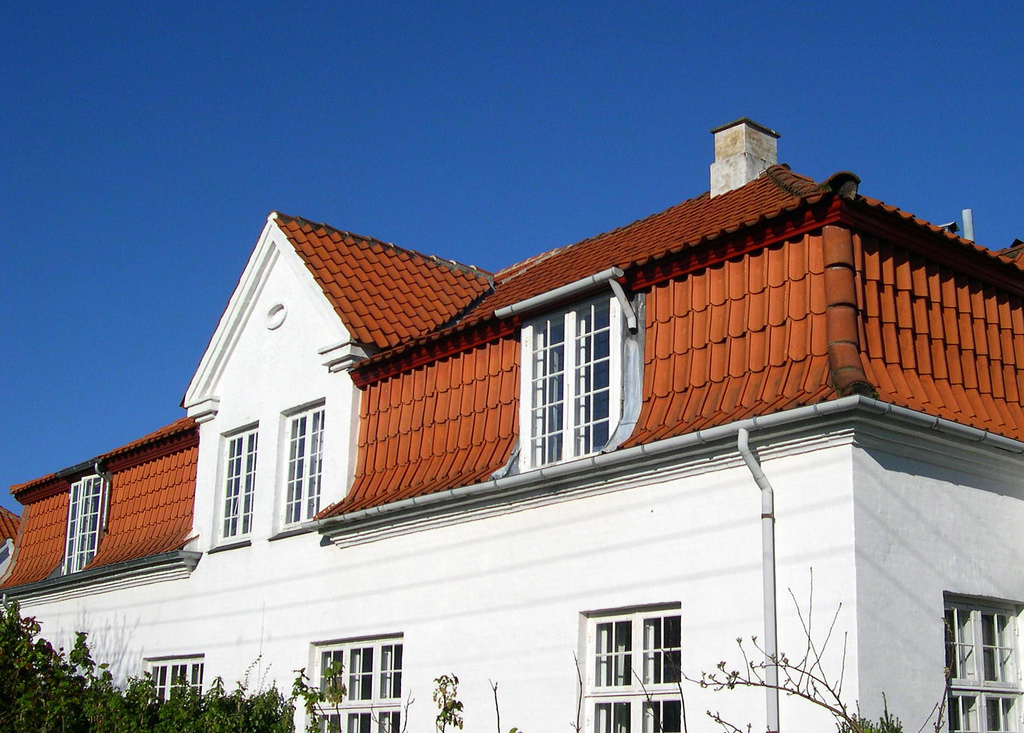
Roof detail

== See also ==
- Eberts Villaby
- Lyset
