= Færøsk Pakhus =

Building in Copenhagen, Denmark

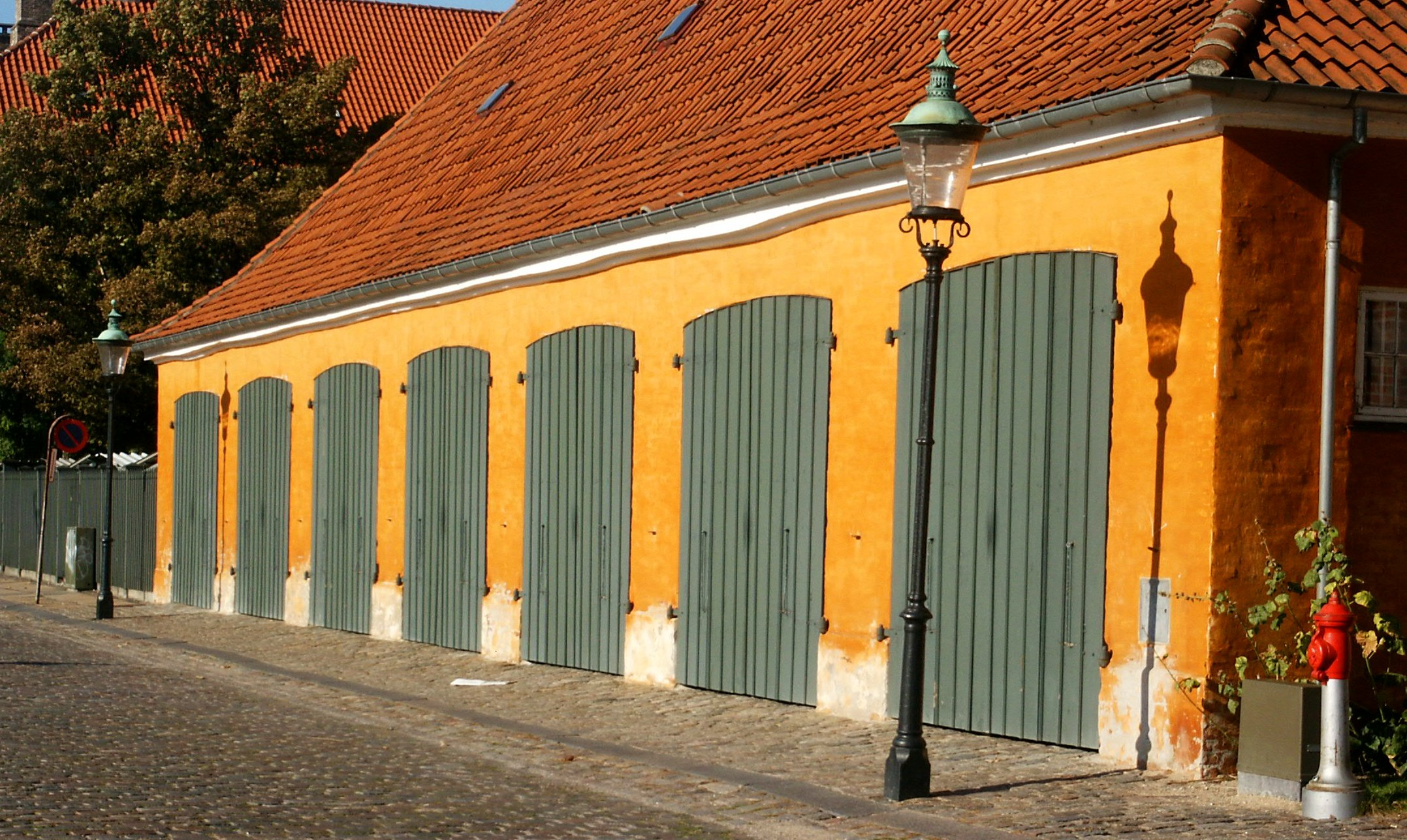
- Interactive map of the Færøsk Pakhus area

General information
- Location: Copenhagen, Denmark
- Coordinates: 55°40′24.81″N 12°34′44.37″E
- Completed: 1772

Færøsk Pakhus (English: Faroese Warehouse) is a small warehouse building located at Frederiksholm Canal, on Slotsholmen, in Copenhagen, Denmark. It is now used by the Ministry of Education.

== History ==
Faroese Warehouse was originally located on the other side of Frederiksholm Canal. It was used for trade with the Faroe Islands. However, Christian IV's Brewhouse on Slotsholmen was hit by fire in 1767 and due to its proximity to Copenhagen Castle, the royal residence, fear of future fires prompted the decision to move the royal brewery to the far side of the canal. Faroese Warehouse was then moved to its current location next to the old brewhouse which was rebuilt and put to other use. The new building was completed in 1772.

== Current use ==
The building now contains meeting rooms used by the Ministry of Education, based in nearby Staldmestergården, and the Ministry of Transportation.
