= Royal Stables (Denmark) =

Stables of the Danish royal family

Coordinates: 55°40′31.39″N 12°34′41″E

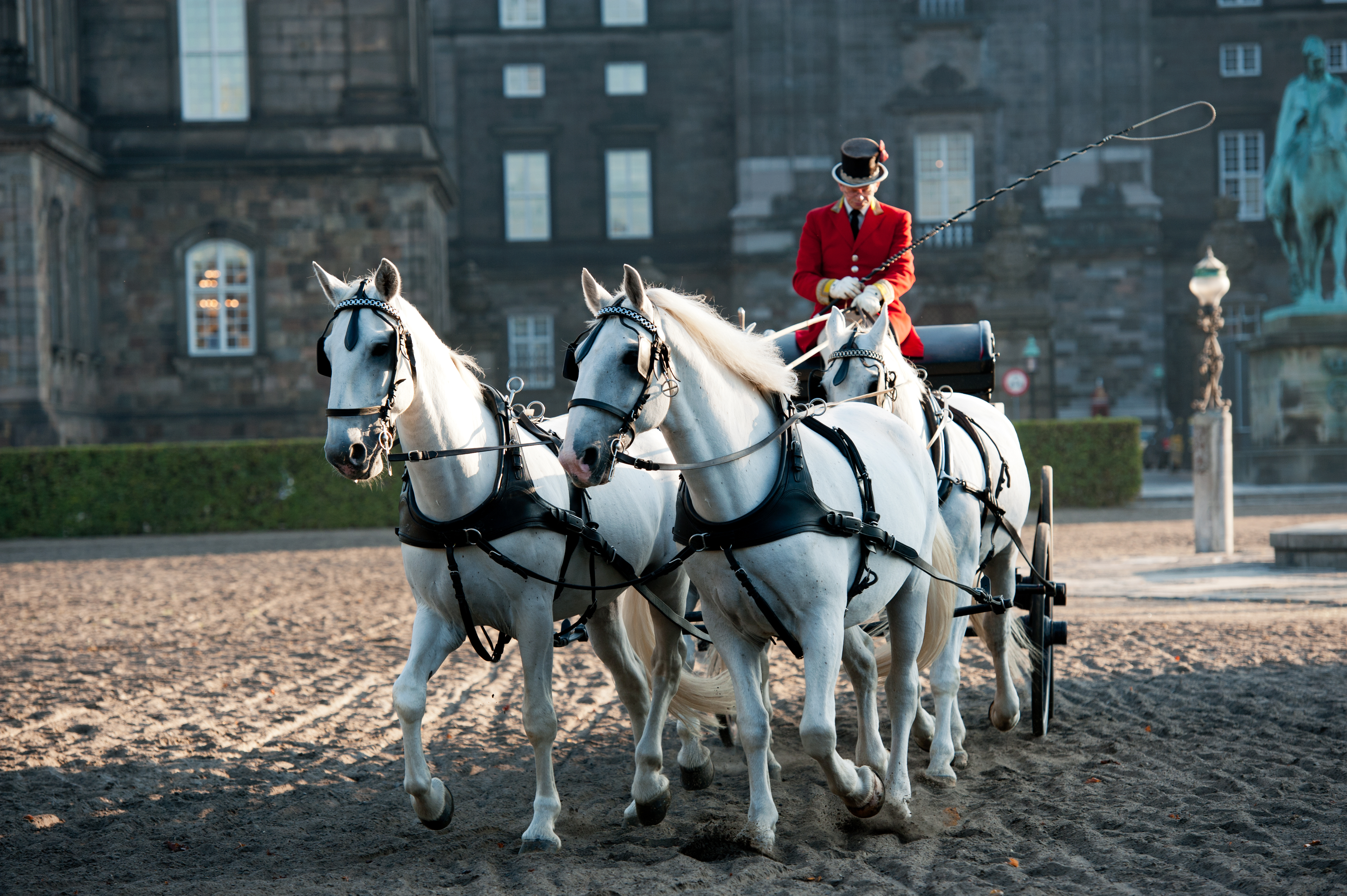
The Royal Stables at Christiansborg Palace, Copenhagen.

The Royal Stables (Danish: De Kongelige Stalde) is the mews (i.e., combined stables and carriage house) of the Danish monarchy which provides the ceremonial transport for the Danish royal family during state events and festive occasions. The Royal Stables are located at Christiansborg Palace on the island of Slotsholmen in central Copenhagen, Denmark. In 1789, the number of horses reached a peak with 270 horses stabled. Nowadays, there are about 20 horses in the Royal Stables.

The Royal Stables are regularly open to the public and include a small museum. The state coaches and other carriages are kept there, along with about 20 horses.

== History ==
=== Copenhagen Castle ===
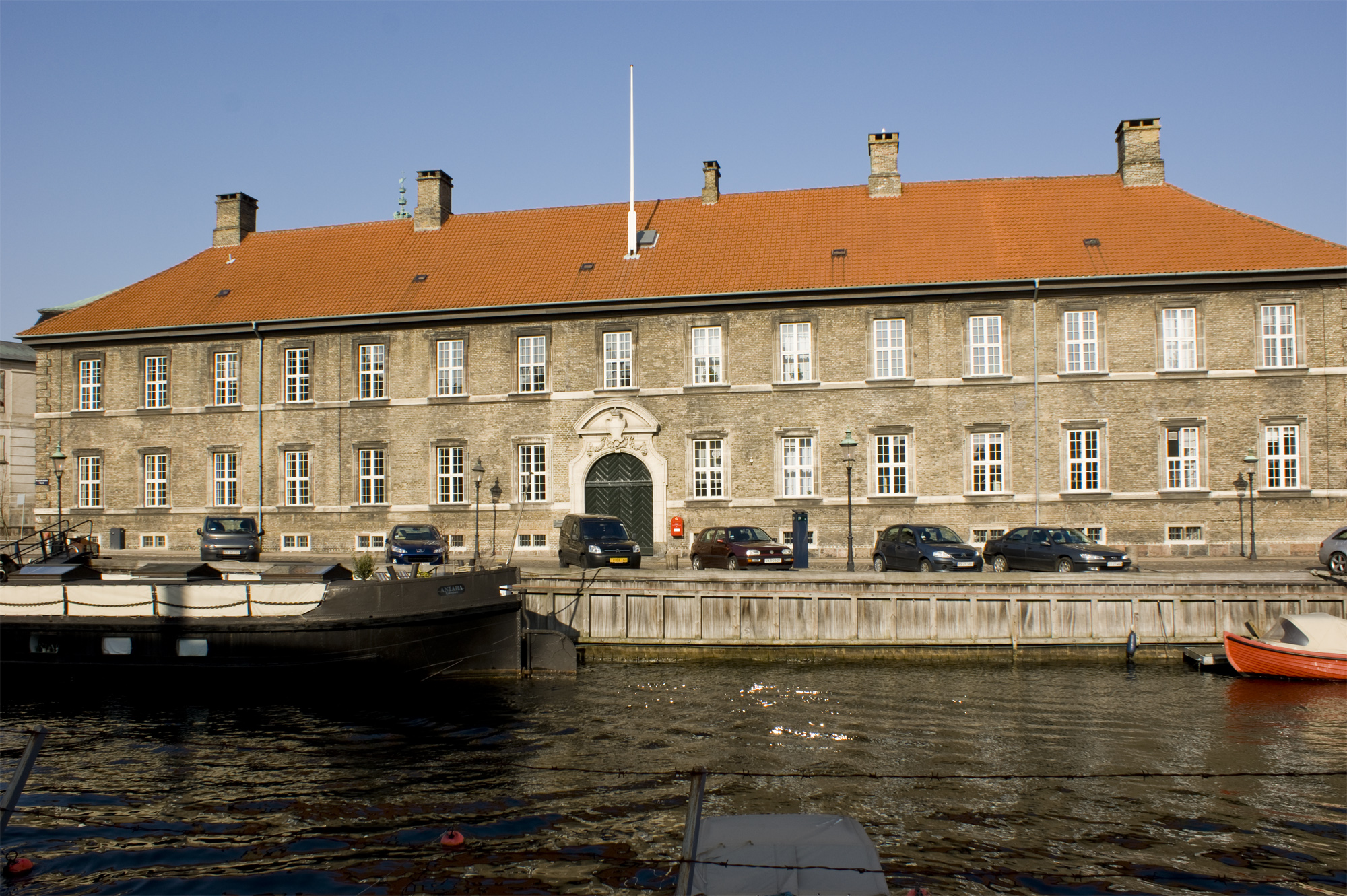
The Crown Equerry Building by Frederiksholms Canal.

Already in the 16th century, a large zigzag shaped stable complex was located on Slotsholmen behind the Copenhagen Castle which housed the king's horses and carriages. In 1590, a foreign traveller counted 52 horses in the stables.

During the reign of the horse enthusiast King Christian V at the end of the 17th century there were about 170 horses and 152 staff in the Royal Stables. There was direct access from the castle to the stables by means of a secret passage, and the king was seen there daily.

After his accession to the throne in 1699, King Frederick IV carried out a large reconstruction of the stable complex, leading to a rectangular riding ground surrounded by new stables and carriage house. Furthermore, from 1703 to 1705 he had a new Baroque building constructed adjacent to Frederiksholms Canal to house the Crown Equerry and the staff at the Royal Stables. The Crown Equerry building still exists and today houses the Ministry of Education and the Ministry for Ecclesiastical Affairs.

=== Christiansborg Palace ===
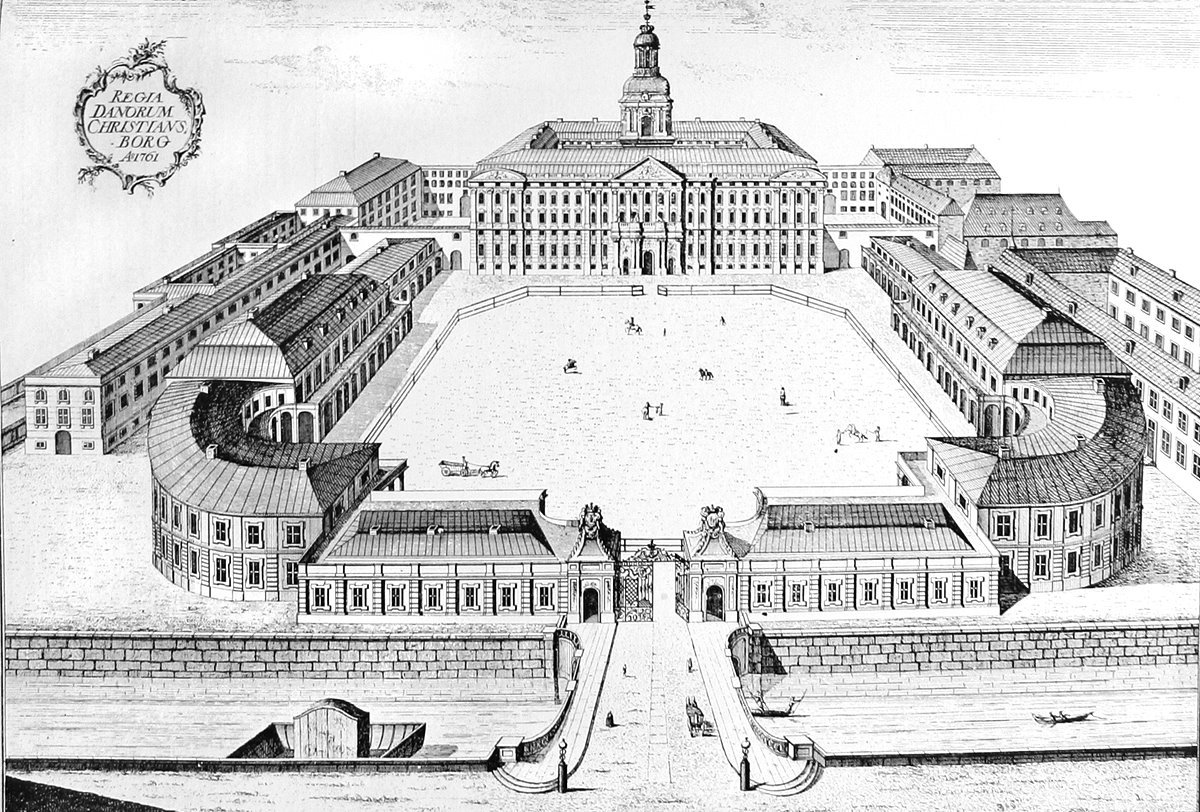
The first Christiansborg Palace with the Riding Grounds surrounded by the Royal Stables

Shortly after his accession to the throne in 1730, King Christian VI had the old and outdated Copenhagen Castle torn down to make way for a new Baroque palace: the first Christiansborg Palace. The old stable complex behind Copenhagen Castle was also torn down to make way for a new and larger stable complex. During the construction work, the many horses of the Royal Stables were temporarily stabled at Frederiksberg Palace, Charlottenborg Palace and Rosenborg Castle.

The new and still existing stable complex was constructed from 1738 to 1745 by the architects Elias David Häusser and Nicolai Eigtved. The new complex included an outdoor riding ground surrounded by buildings containing an indoor riding arena as well as stables with room for a total of 87 riding horses and 165 carriage horses. Part of these stable buildings still remain unchanged since their inauguration in 1746 with an extravagant decoration of marble pillars.

The number of horses reached a peak in 1789 when 270 horses were stabled at Christiansborg. In the course of the 20th century, the horses were gradually replaced by cars and today about 20 horses are stabled in the Royal Stables.

== Carriage horses ==
The horses in the Royal Stables today are for the most part either Kladrubers from the Czech Republic or Danish Warmblood, though this has not always been the case. For centuries locally bred Frederiksborg horses took pride of place in the harness on major state occasions, until problems due to inbreeding led to their use being discontinued in the mid-19th century. The horses are regularly exercised on Christiansborg's riding ground and in the streets of Copenhagen.

== See also ==
- Royal Mews (United Kingdom)
- Royal Stables (Sweden)
- Royal Stables (Netherlands)
- Theatre Museum in the Court Theatre (above the Royal Stables)

== Literature ==
- Hauschildt, Christina og Nitschke, Eva (2008). De Kongelige Heste. Copenhagen: Gyldendal. ISBN 978-87-02-03973-3.
- Hvidt, Kristian; Ellehøj, Svend; Norn, Otto (1975). Christiansborg Slot. Udgivet af Folketingets Præsidium. Copenhagen: Nyt Nordisk Forlag Arnold Busck. ISBN 87-1701955-9.
- Lund, Hakon (1987). "Bind 1: Slotsholmen". In Bramsen, Bo (ed.). København, før og nu – og aldrig. Copenhagen: Palle Fogtdal. ISBN 87-7807720-6.
