= Christof Marselis =

Architect

Christof Marselis was an architect. Circa 1702, he travelled to Copenhagen, Denmark, where he worked as royal architect under Wilhelm Friedrich von Platen. The exact extent of his contributions remain uncertain but he worked on such buildings as the Garrison Church (1703–1706), the Stable Master's House (1703–1705) and Frederiksberg Palace in Copenhagen.
