= Frederiksholms Kanal =

Canal in Denmark

Fredericksholms Canal
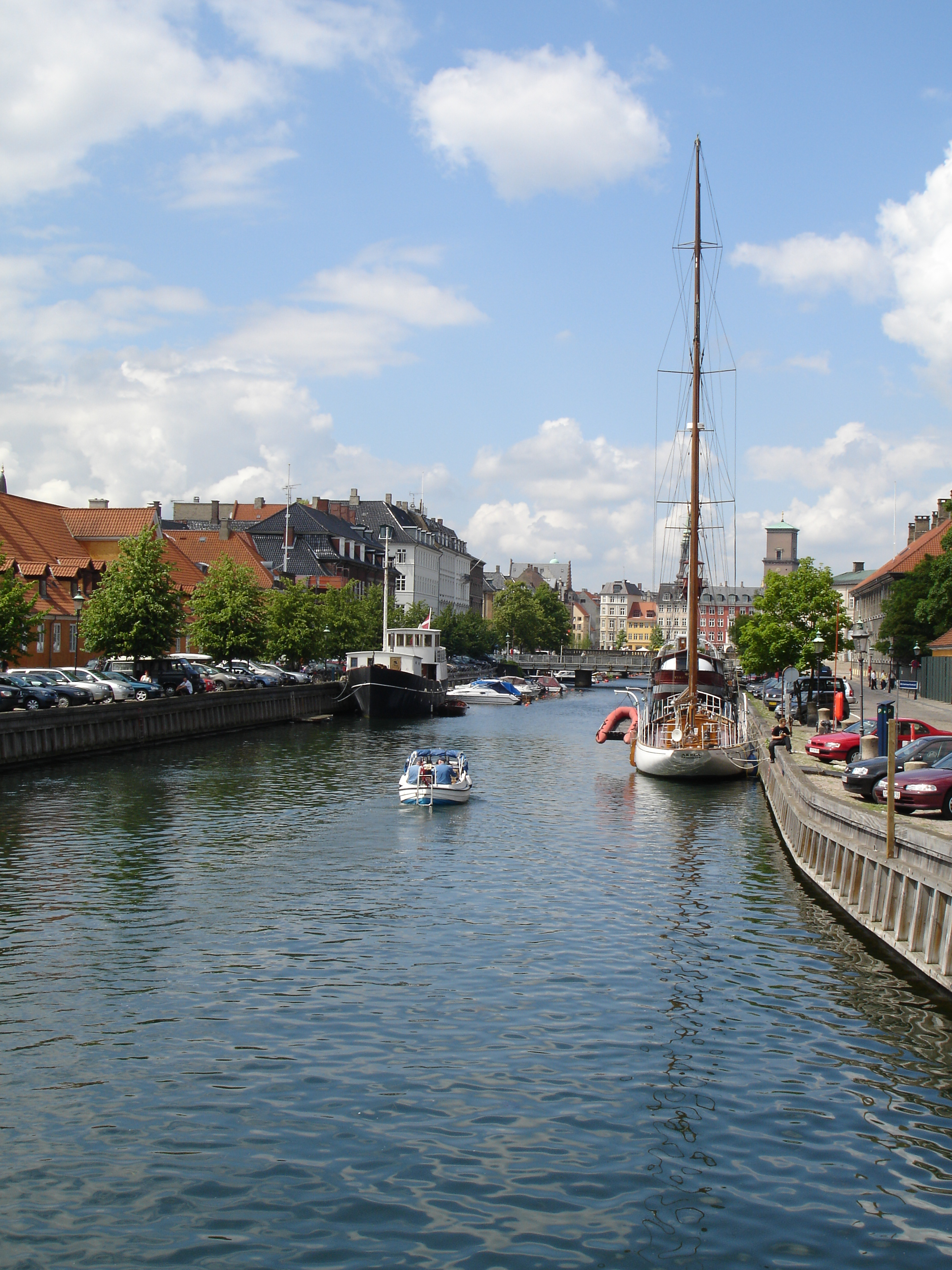
- View of the canal from the harborfront
- Location: Copenhagen, Denmark

Geography
- Beginning coordinates: 56.676°N 12.576°E
- Ending coordinates: 55.672°N 12.580°E

Frederiksholms Kanal is a canal in central Copenhagen, Denmark, which runs along the south-west side of Slotsholmen, together with Slotsholmskanalen separating the island from Zealand. The name also applies to the continuation of Rådhusstræde which follows the canal for most of its course, first on its south side and for the last stretch, from Prinsens Bro and to the waterfront, on both sides of the canal. Several historic buildings face the canal, ranging in size from Prince's Mansion, now housing National Museum, and Christiansborg's riding grounds to the diminutive Stable Boy's House, part of Civiletatens Materialgård, a former storage facility now used by the Royal Danish Academy of Fine Arts's School of Sculpture.

== History ==
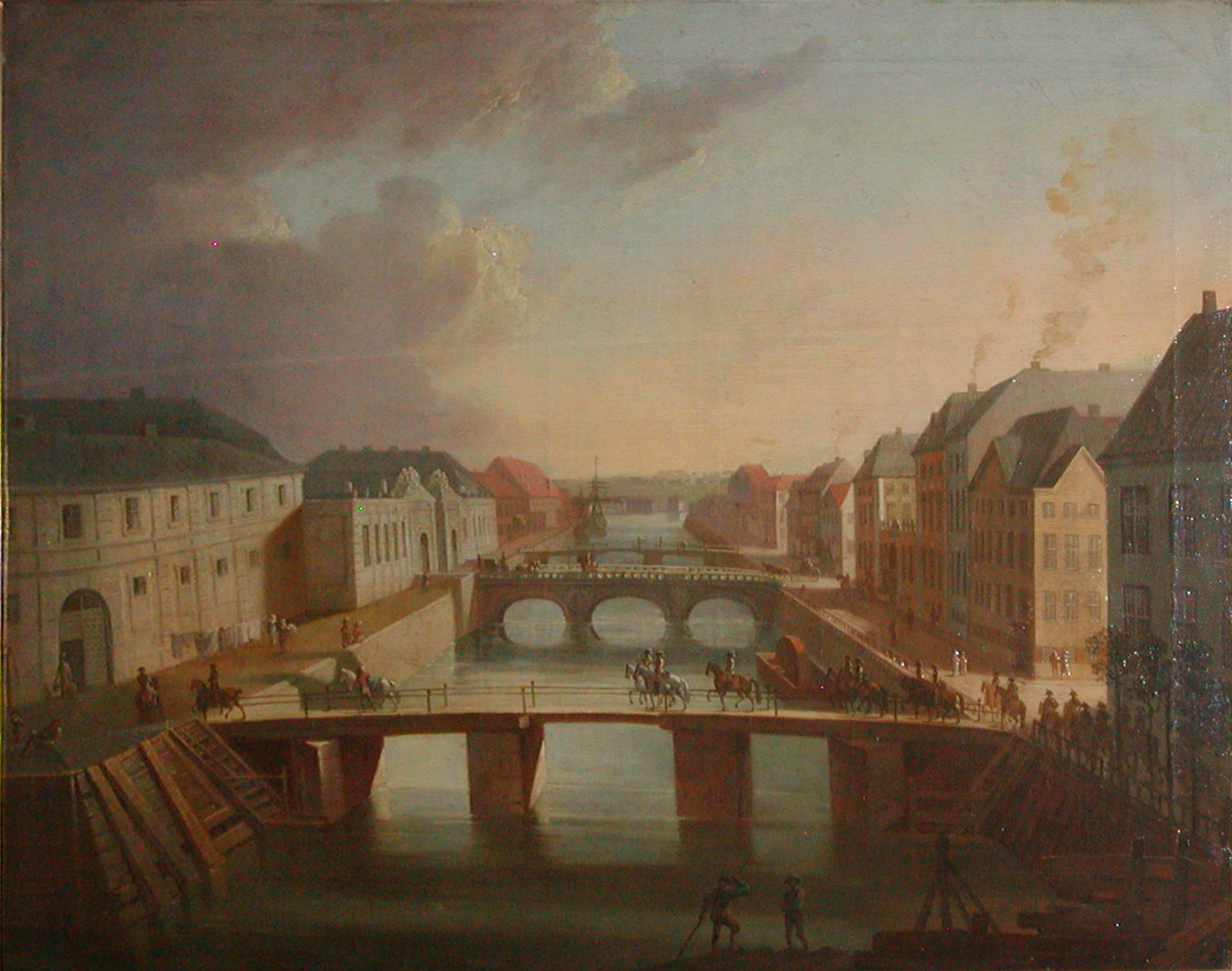
A scene from Frederiksholms Kanal in 1794, painted by Christian August Lorentzen

The canal traces its history back to the extension of Copenhagen's West Rampart following the Assault on Copenhagen in 1659 which had taken place there. To better protect Slotsholmen, at that time home both to the royal palace and the fleet, the West Rampart was extended well into the sea. The shallow-watered area between the extended rampart and Slotsholmen was filled to form a district which was given the name Frederiksholm. Frederiksholms Kanal was dug out in 1681.

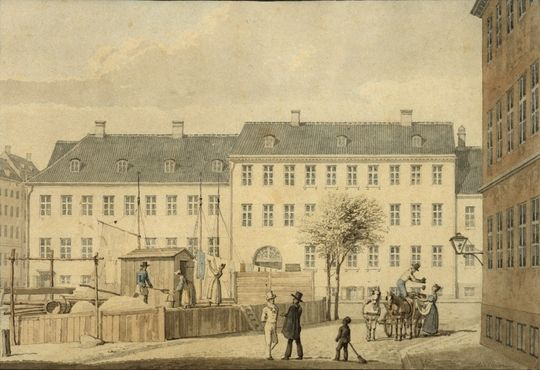
The sandbox at Frederiksholms Kanal, watercolour by Heinrich Gustav Ferdinand Holm from 1835

Part of the new Frederiksholm area was used for the storage of building materials which were used in the construction work, both military and civilian, which was constantly ongoing in the expanding city. Many materials arrived by ship and the location next to the canal where they could moor was therefore convenient. There was also a sandpit where dredger deposited sand used for constructions around the city.

== Notable buildings and residents ==
=== The two storage facilities ===
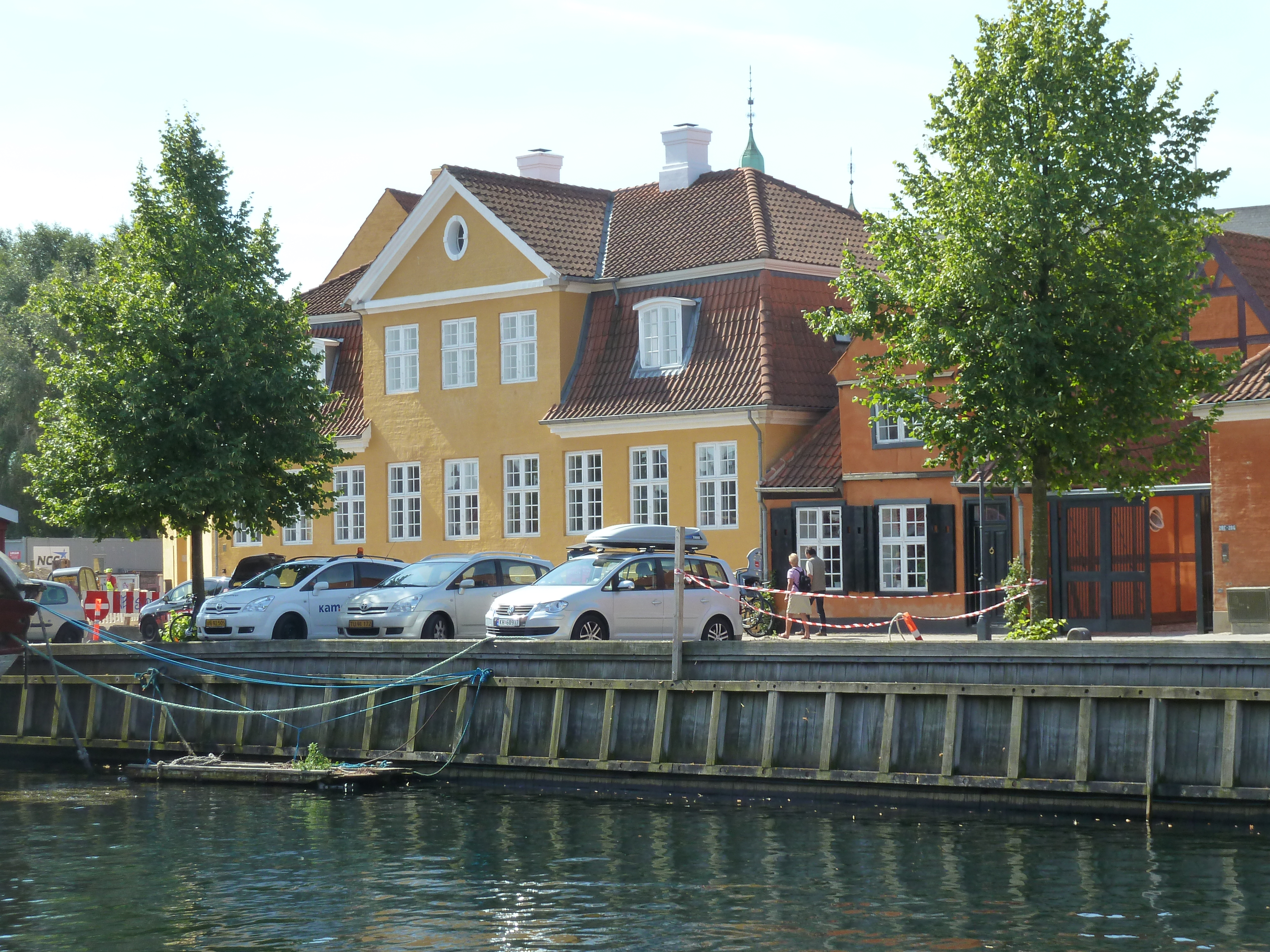
The Storage Keeper's House

The military storage facility Fæstningens Materialgård was established shortly after Frederiksholms Kanal had been dug but none of the original buildings exist today. The buildings remaining today are arranged around a central courtyard. The oldest of them is the Storage Keeper's House from 1740. The military storage facility was joined by Civiletatens Materialgård in 1771, a civilian storage facility, consisting of a small cluster of yellow-washed buildings.

=== Royal Horse Guards Barracks ===
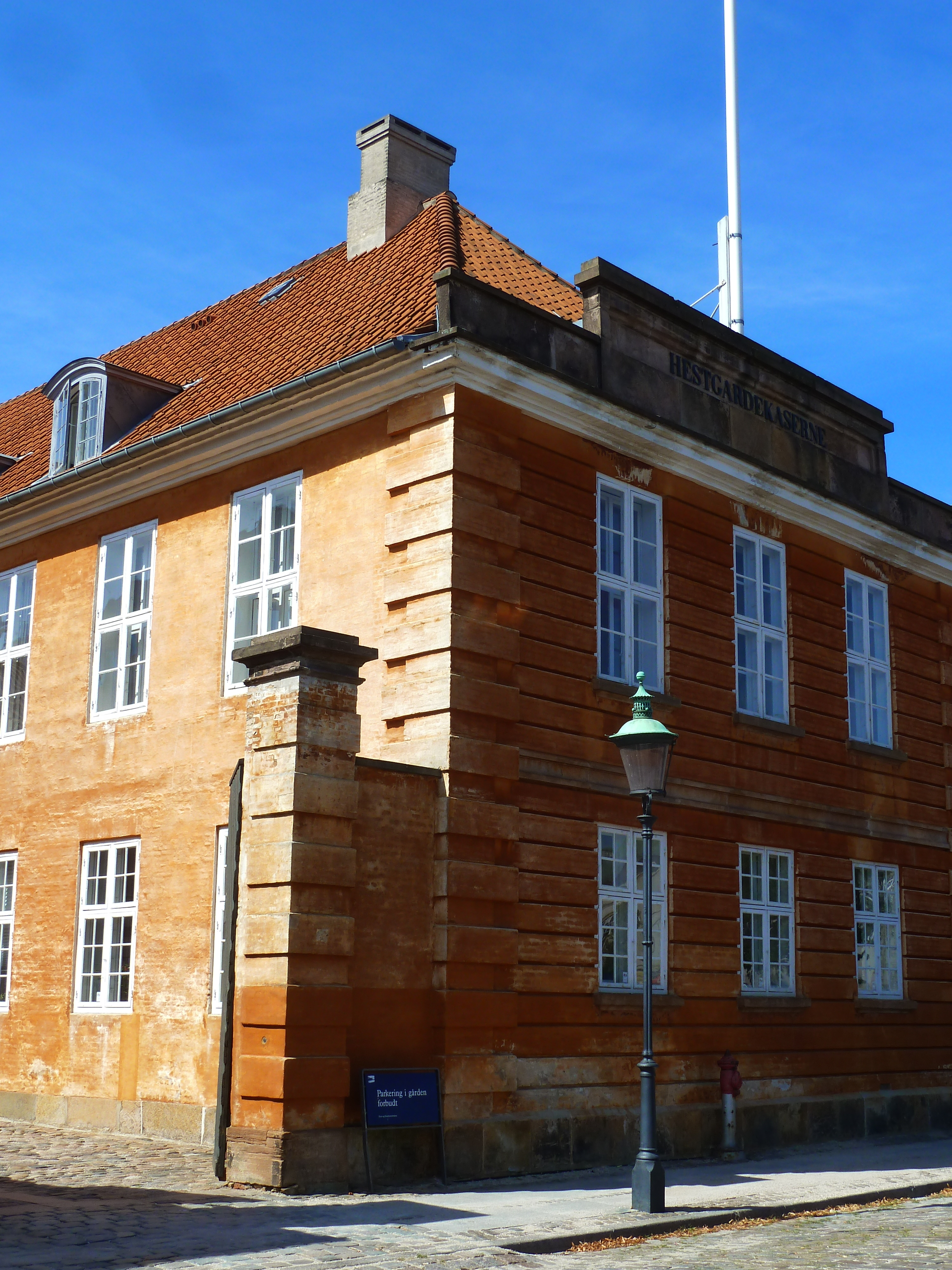
The Royal Horse Guards Barracks seen from the canal

in 1792 followed the Royal Horse Guards Barracks. They were built on a strip of land formerly part of Civiletatens Materialgård. The barracks were hit by a fire in 1798 but rebuilt and after the Royal Horse Guards were disbanded and served as Artillery Barracks.

=== Town houses ===
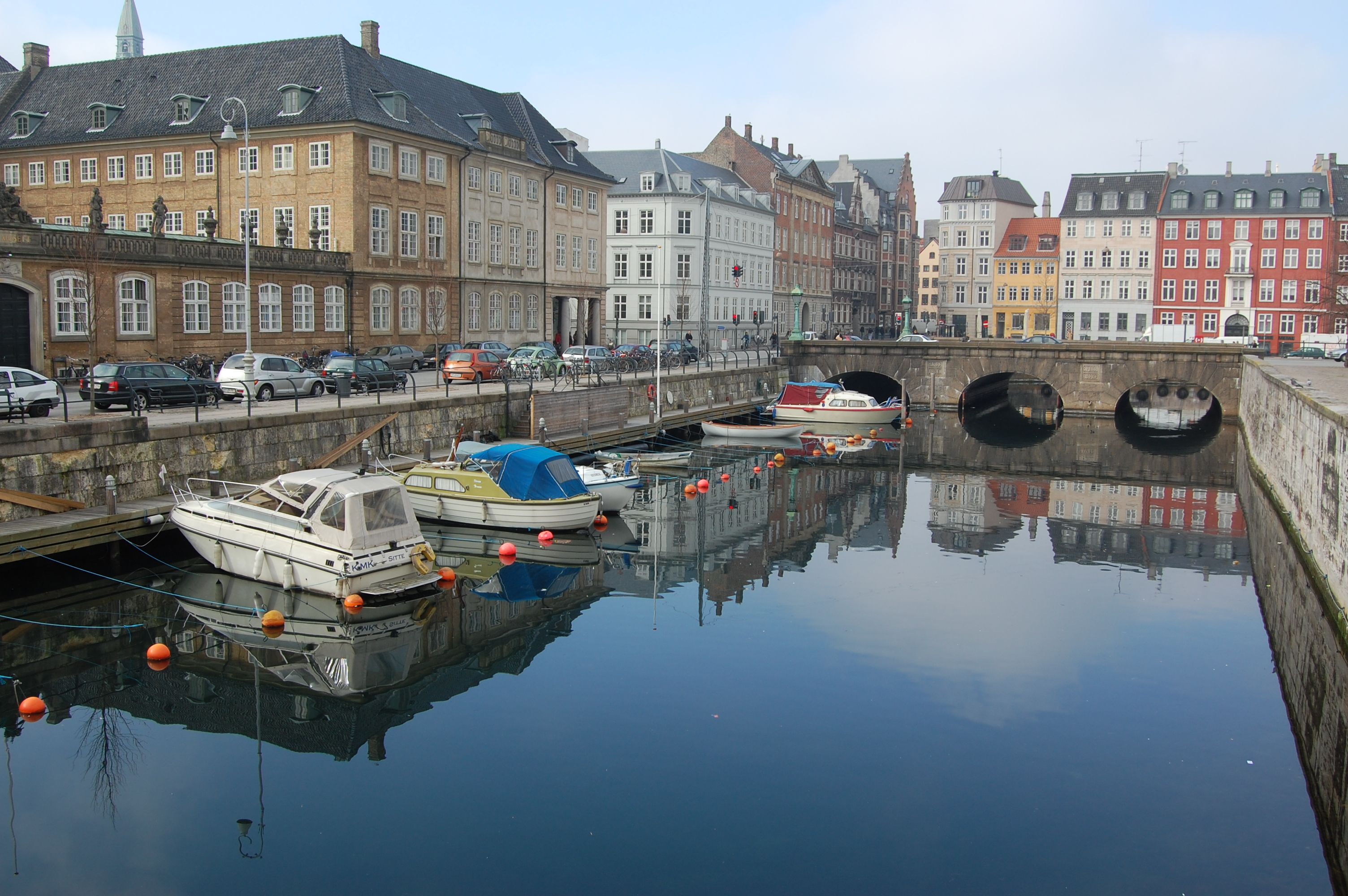
The Prince's Mansion

Further inland, the Frederiksholm area was built over with residential buildings. The most prominent of these is Prince's Mansion, originally built in 1681 but expanded and adapted for use as a residence for two consecutive crown princes in the middle of the 18th century.

Barchmann Mansion was built in 1741 and originally rented out to foreign diplomats.

=== Slotsholmen-side buildings ===
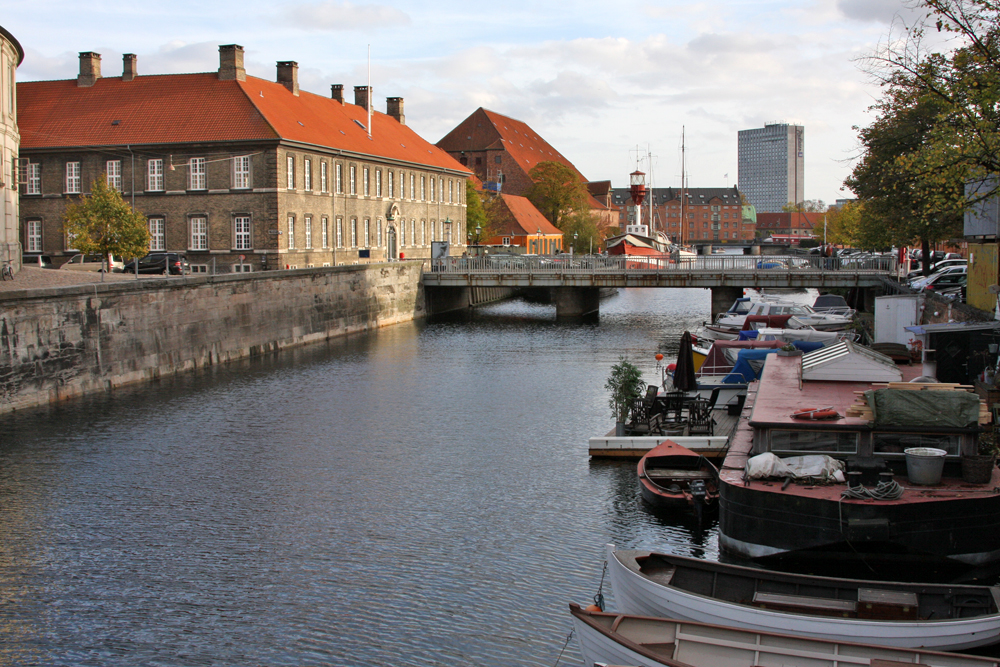
Staldmestergården and Christian IV's Brewhouse

A few buildings on the Slotsholmen side of the canal also addressed on Frederiksholms Kanal, including Staldmestergården and the small Faroese Warehouse. The latter was originally located on the other side of the canal but moved to the current location when the King's Brewery, until then based in its current neighbour, the building now known as Christian IV's Brewhouse, moved across the canal to minimize fire hazards. The new brewhouse was demolished in 1976 and the site, known as the Brewhouse Site, has remained undeveloped since then. It was acquired by the Realdania foundation in 2005 and a mixed-use building designed by Rem Koolhass is expected to go under construction in 2013. The building will houseDanish Architecture Centre, now based in Gammel Dok on the other side of the harbour, as well as offices and dwellings.

== Bridges ==
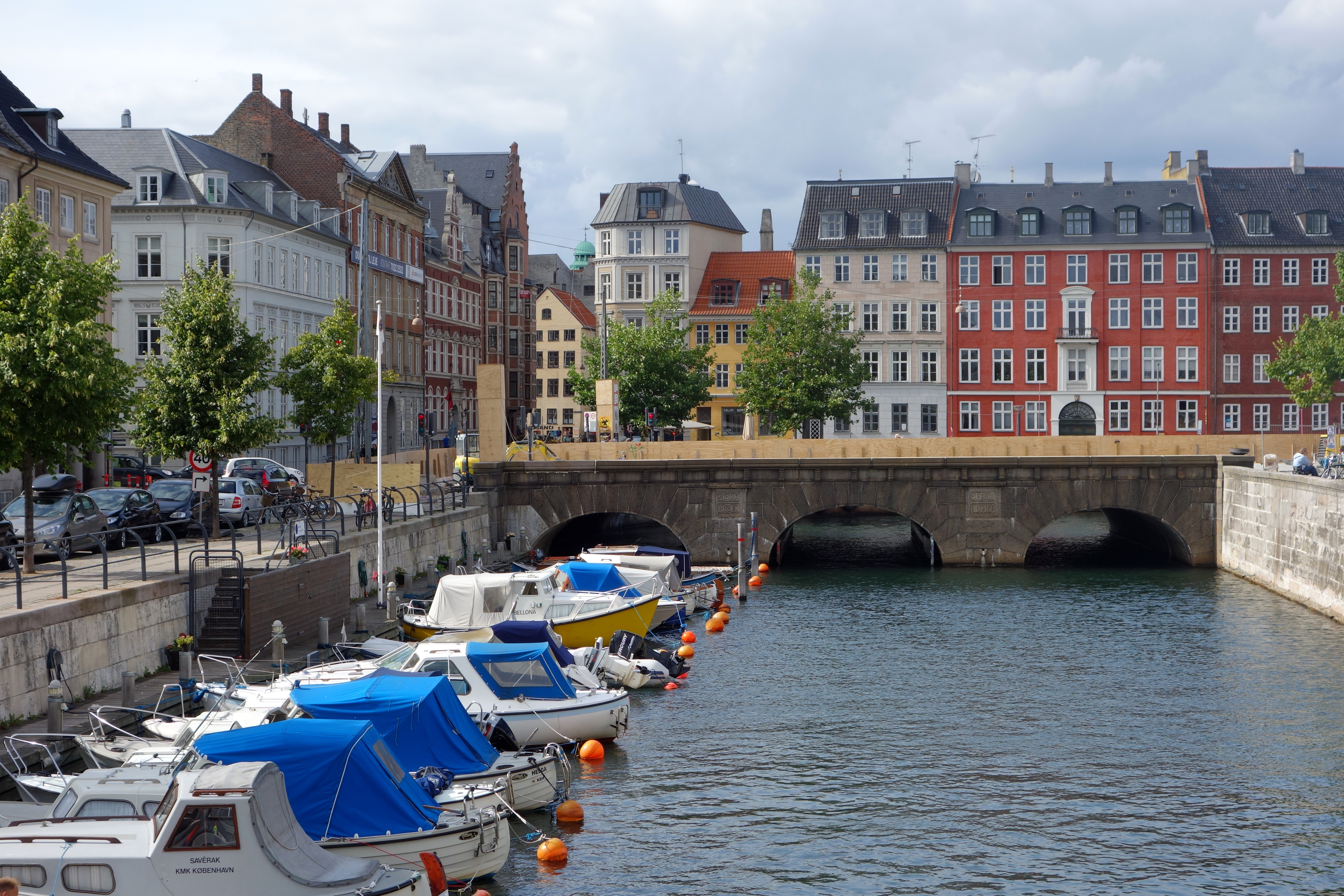
Storm Bridge seen from Marble Bridge

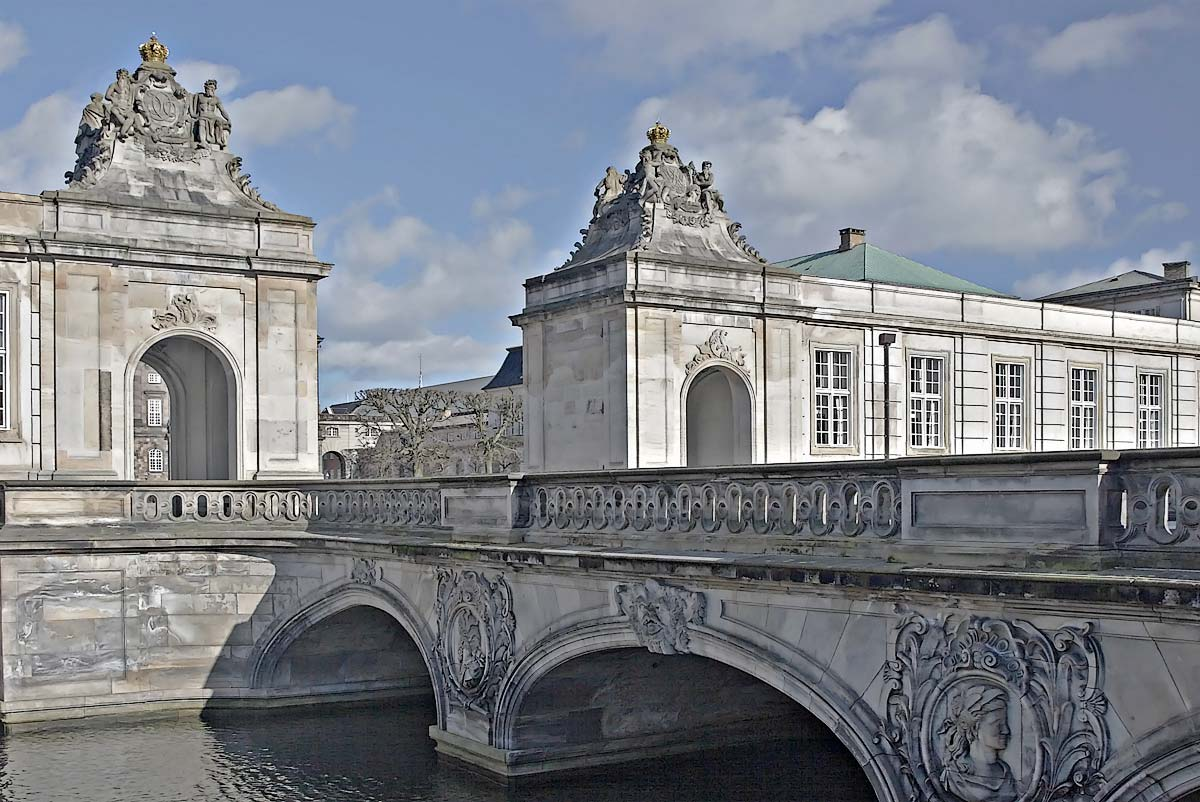
Marble Bridge with its two pavilions

Frederiksholms Kanal is spanned by four bridges, including Storm Bridge which separates it from Slotsholmens Kanal. The latter is named for the storming of the city in 1659 which led to the construction of the canal. A double arch bridge built in stone and connecting Zealand-side Stormgade to Vindebrogade on Slotsholmen, the current bridge was constructed in 1914 to a design by Martin Nyrop from 1898.

The most notable bridge crossing the canal is Marble Bridge which provides access to Christiansborg riding grounds. The old main entrance and one of few surviving features of the first Christiansborg Palace which burned in 1794, the bridge was constructed from 1739 to 1745 with Nicolai Eigtved as principal architect.

Prinsens Bro (Prince's Bridge), also known as Tøjhusbroen (Arsenal Bridge) after Christian IV's Arsenal on Slotsholmen, connects Ny Kongensgade to Tøjhusgade. The first bridge at the site was constructed in 1682 but the present one dates from the 20th century.

Bryghusbroen (Brewhouse Bridge) spans the mouth of the bridge, between Christian IV's Brewhouse and the Brewhouse Site. It is a bascule bridge built in 1935 and originally also carried railway tracks for the harbour rail line but they were removed in 1972. It received its current name in 1963.

== Ships ==
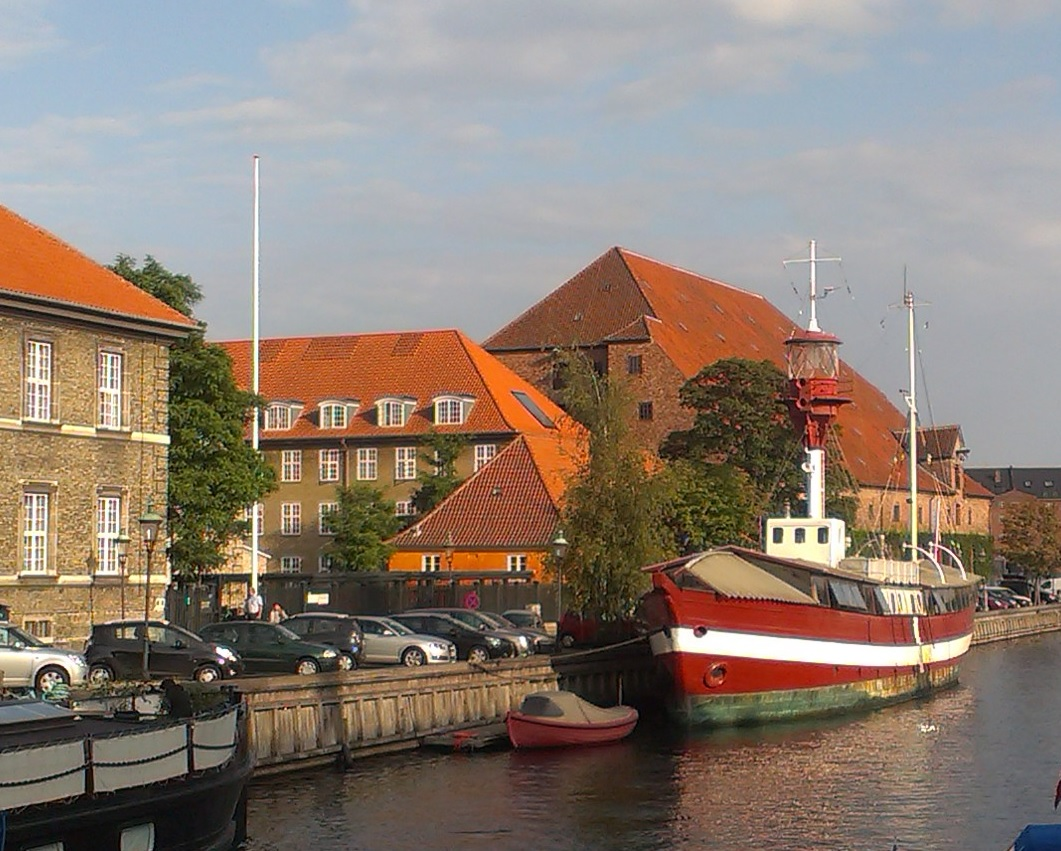
Lightvessel No. XI

The canal is home to a couple of large house boats. The most distinctive of these is Lightvessel No. XI, originally built in 1878 and later altered several times before it was decommissioned and sold in 1977, after 99 years of service at various positions. The buyer was artist and designer Bo Bofils who adapted it for use as a house boat and moved it to its current location. A sister ship, Lightvessel No. XVII Gedser Rev, is owned by the National Museum and is based in Nyhavn where it serves as a museum ship.
