= Staldmestergården =

Building in Copenhagen, Denmark

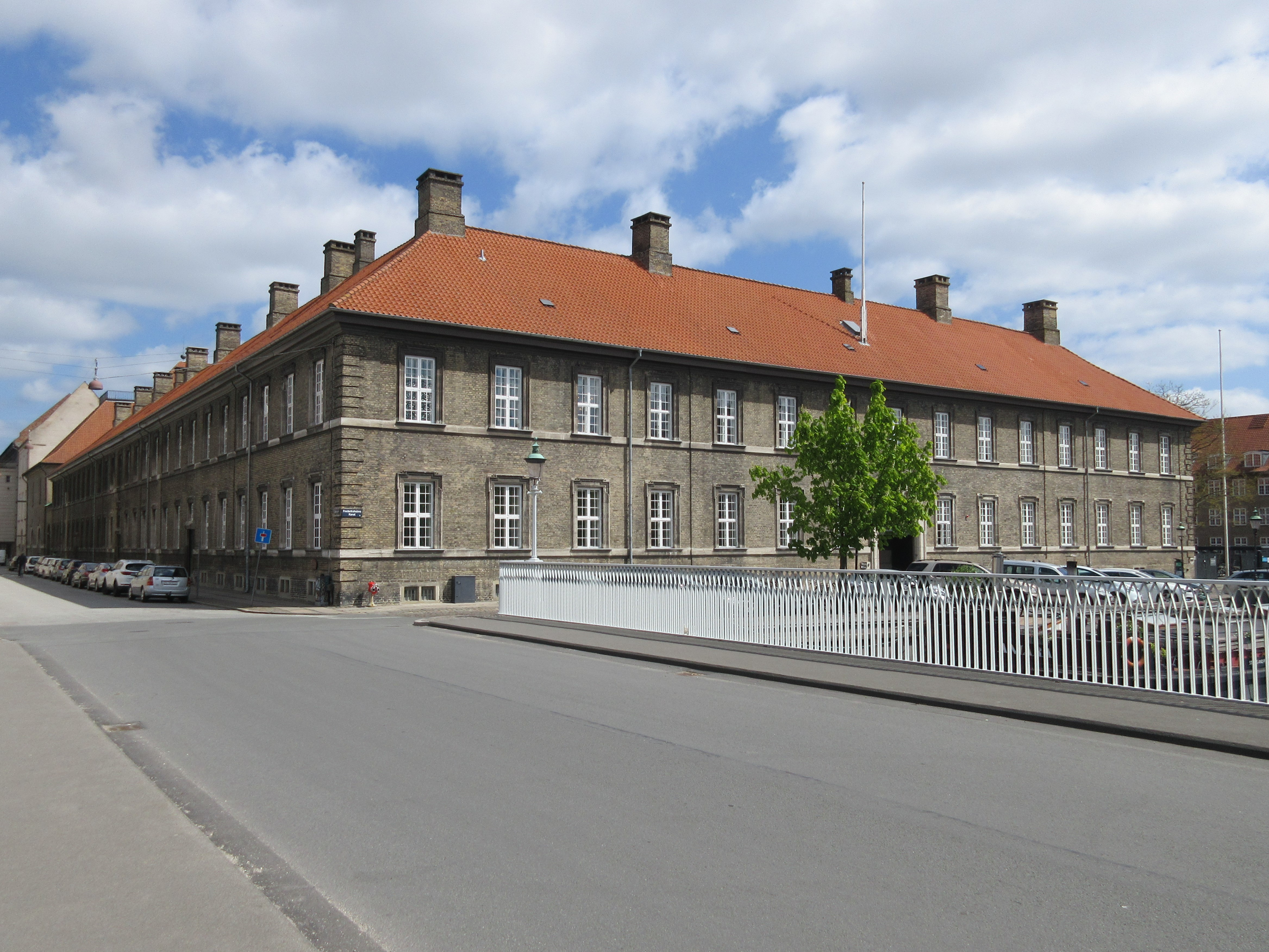
- Staldmestergården seen from Prinsens Bro
- Interactive map of the Staldmestergården area

General information
- Architectural style: Baroque
- Location: Slotsholmen, Copenhagen, Denmark
- Coordinates: 55°40′27″N 12°34′41″E
- Construction started: 1703
- Completed: 1705
- Client: Frederick IV of Denmark

Design and construction
- Architects: Christof Marselis; Ernst Brandenburger; Wilhelm Friedrich von Platen

Staldmestergården (English: Stable Master's House) is a historic building overlooking Frederiksholm Canal on Slotsholmen, between Christiansborg Rising Grounds and Christian IV's Brewhouse, in central Copenhagen, Denmark. Originally built for the avener and other administration personnel of the royal stables, it now houses the Ministries of Education and Ecclesiastical Affairs. The building was listed in the Danish registry of protected buildings and places in 1918.

== History ==
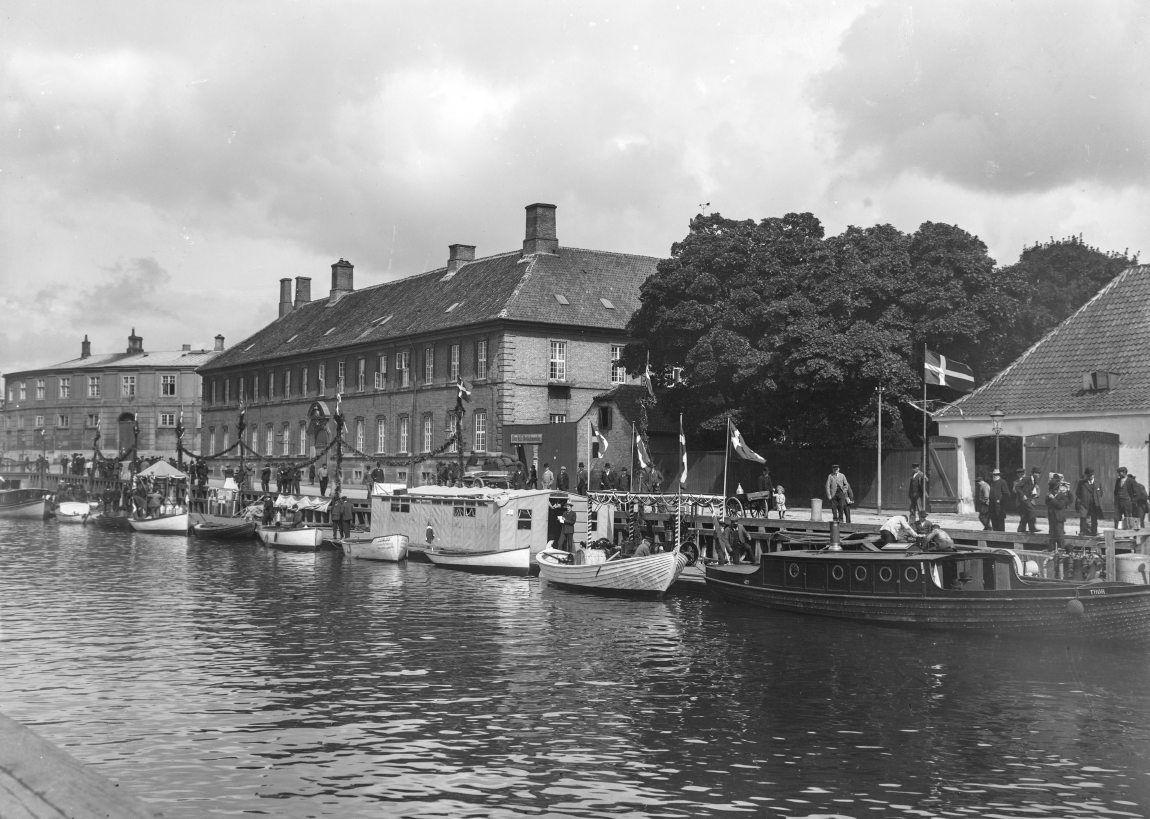
The building in the second half of the 19th century

Staldmestergården was built from 1703 to 1705 as a residence for the staff working at the Royal Stables at neighbouring Copenhagen Castle.

In the early 20th century, the central administration needed more space and the stables administration had to vacate the building. One of the institutions which in 1910 moved in was the Kultus Ministry. After it was split into a Ministry of Education and a Ministry of Ecclesiastical Affairs in 1916, they continued to share the building.

== Architecture ==
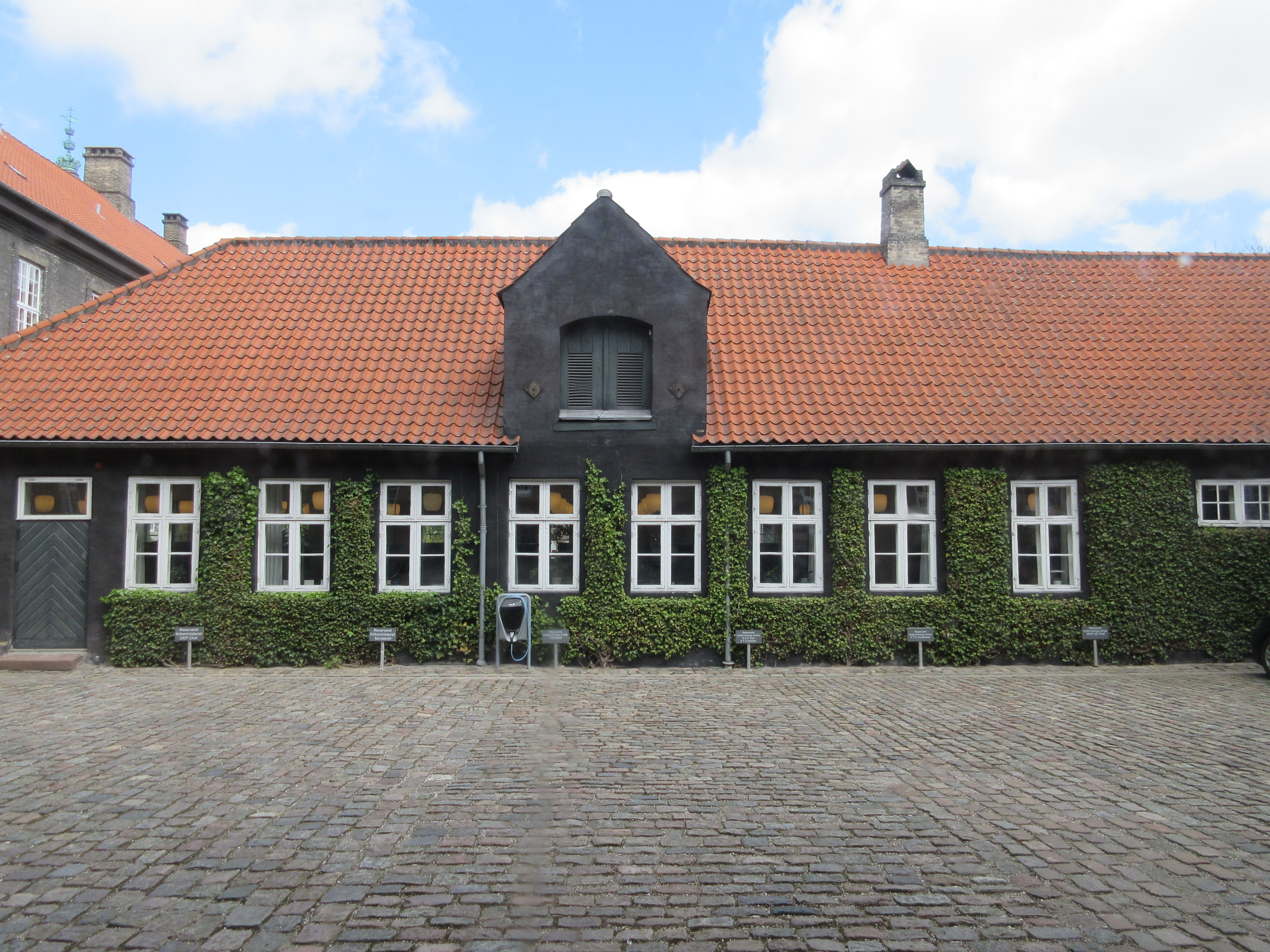
The building in the courtyard

Staldmestergården is a large L-shaped building, with two storeys and a cellar, designed in the Italian Baroque style which Marselis had had the opportunity to study during his years in Italy. It is built in yellow brick and has a hipped roof in red tiles. The main entrance is located in the short wing facing the canal. The portal is carved in limestone from Stevns and is also in the Italian Baroque style.

== See also ==
- Architecture of Denmark
