= Christian IV's Brewhouse =

Building in Copenhagen, Denmark

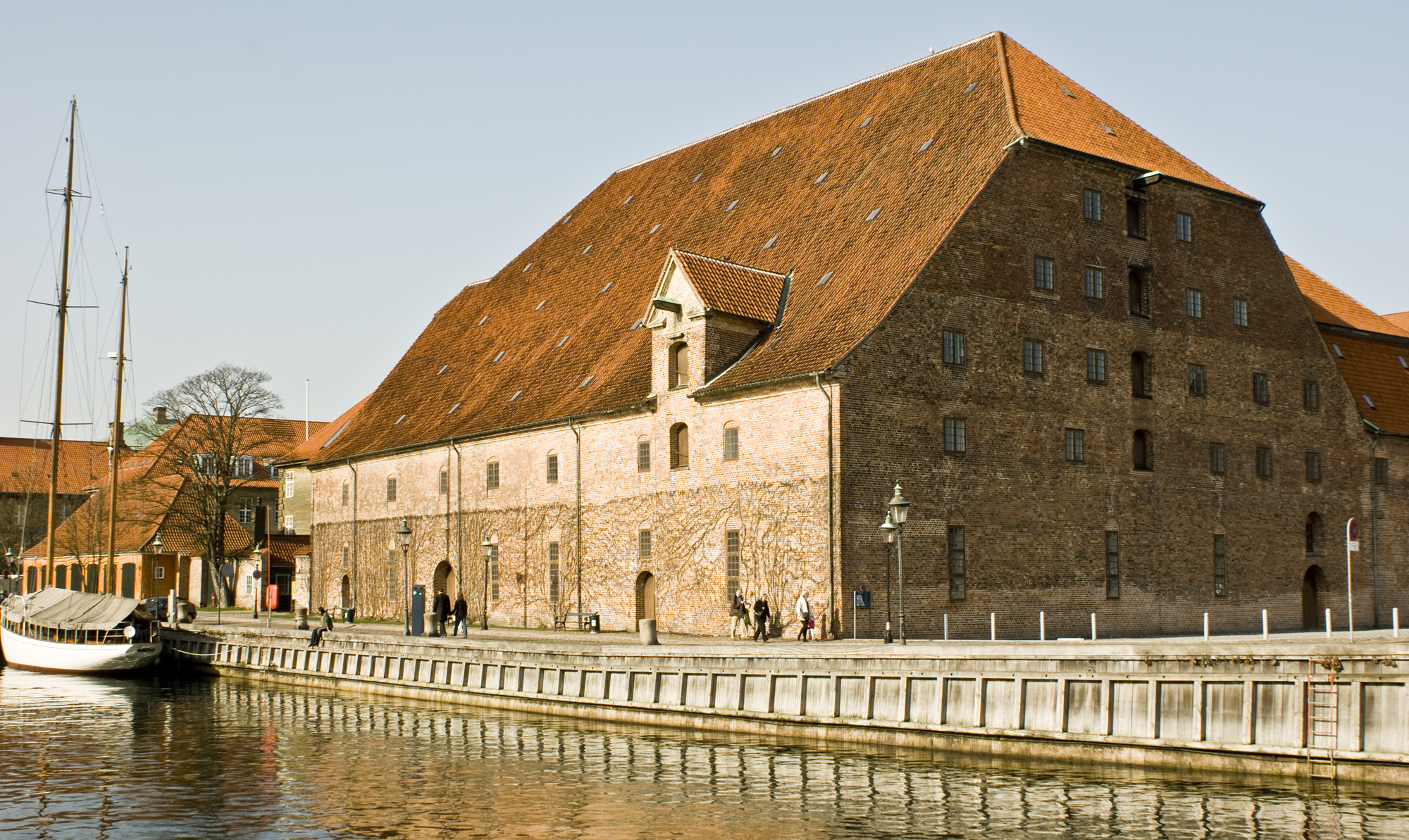
- Interactive map of the Christian IV's Brewhouse area

General information
- Architectural style: Renaissance
- Location: Copenhagen, Denmark
- Coordinates: 55.6731°N 12.5798°E
- Completed: 1608
- Client: Christian IV

Christian IV's Brewhouse (Danish: Christian IV's Bryghus) is a building in Copenhagen, Denmark, dating from 1608. In spite of the name under which it is known today, the building was not originally built for the purpose of brewing beer. It is located on Slotsholmen by the harbourfront and was constructed for military purposes as a corner bastion, part of Christian IV's fortification of the city.
