= Slotsholmen =

Island in the harbour of Copenhagen, Denmark

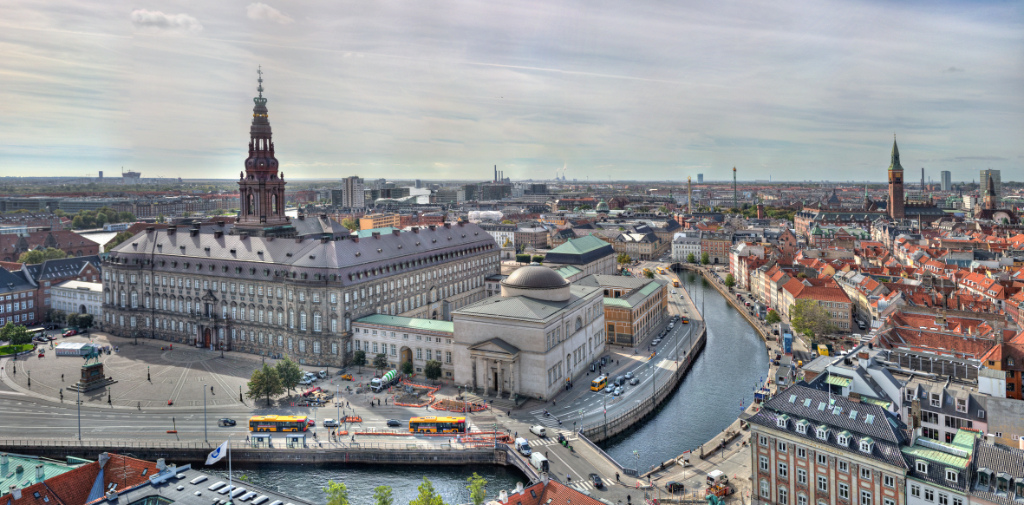
- The island of Slotsholmen

Geography
- Coordinates: 55.675°N 12.581°E
- Area: 0.21 km^{2} (0.081 sq mi)

Demographics
- Population: 18

Slotsholmen (English: The Castle Islet) is an island in the harbour of Copenhagen, Denmark, and part of Copenhagen Inner City. The name is taken from the successive castles and palaces located on the island since Bishop Absalon constructed the city's first castle on the island in 1167 at the site where Christiansborg Palace lies today.

Recognised as the centre of the Government of Denmark since the Middle Ages, the island is sometimes referred to as 'the Island of Power' (Magtens Ø), and is lined with central government institutions and ministries; the name Slotsholmen is thus also frequently used as a metonym for overall Danish governmental administration.

The island is dominated by the vast Christiansborg Palace which houses the Danish Parliament, the Supreme Court of Denmark, the Prime Minister's Office and the State Rooms of the King. Also located on the island are the most important ministries, the Danish National Archives, the Royal Danish Library, several museums and the historic buildings of the Christian IV's Stock Exchange, the Chancellery and Christian IV's Brewhouse.

== History ==
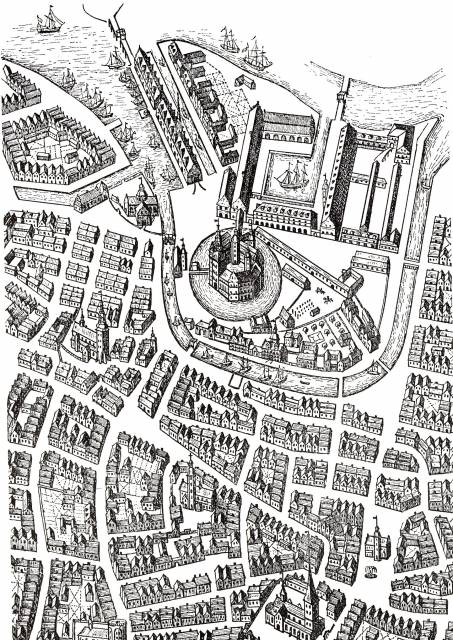
Slotsholmen in 1674 with Copenhagen Castle, Børsen and Christian IV's Naval Harbour

The site used to consist of several small natural islands in the sound between the islands of Zealand and Amager. On the largest of these, Strandholmen (English: Beach Islet), Bishop Absalon of Roskilde constructed a small castle in 1167. In 1250 the castle was extended with two side towers to get the appearance that is now depicted on Copenhagen's Coat of Arms. The castle was conquered by the Hanseatic League 1368 and pulled down the following year as part of peace terms. Shortly after Copenhagen Castle was built on the same site and it became the residence for the Danish king in 1443.

After the 1535-36 siege of Copenhagen during the Count's Feud, it became clear that the castle was outdated as a military installation, and King Christian III transformed the castle from a military stronghold to a more liveable royal residence. However, the reconstruction took place in a rather haphazard way and continued during the reign of the following kings, resulting in a rather irregular appearance of the castle.

At the same time, it became clear that the castle was becoming too small to hold the functions necessary in order to function as a royal residence and seat of the administration so a series of smaller buildings began to be erected on Slotsholmen. Probably during the reign of Christian III a building was constructed on the quay of the canal in front of the castle to house the Chancellery. During the reign of Christian III and Frederick II an arsenal was constructed by the beach south of the castle, and during the reign of Frederick II probably also a supply depot.

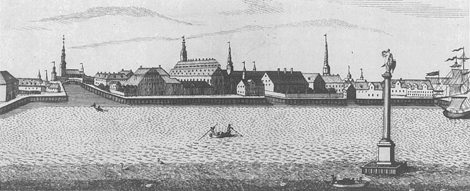
Slotsholmen from the south with Frederiksholms Canal to the left and the entrance to Christian IV's Naval Harbour in the middle (1750)

Under King Christian IV Slotsholmen saw considerable development, especially in the southern part of the island. Here a new naval harbour was established, surrounded on one side by an Arsenal and on the other side by a Supply Depot. Other new buildings constructed were the Stock Exchange and the Brewhouse. All four of these historic buildings are still there today.

By the time of the introduction of the absolute monarchy in 1660, the role of Slotsholmen as the centre of administration was firmly established.

During the reign of King Frederick III, further lack of space in the castle led to the construction in 1665-1673 of an additional building between the Supply Depot and the Arsenal. This building, also still visible today, was to house the Cabinet of curiosities of the king, founded about 1650, and the Royal Library, founded in 1648.

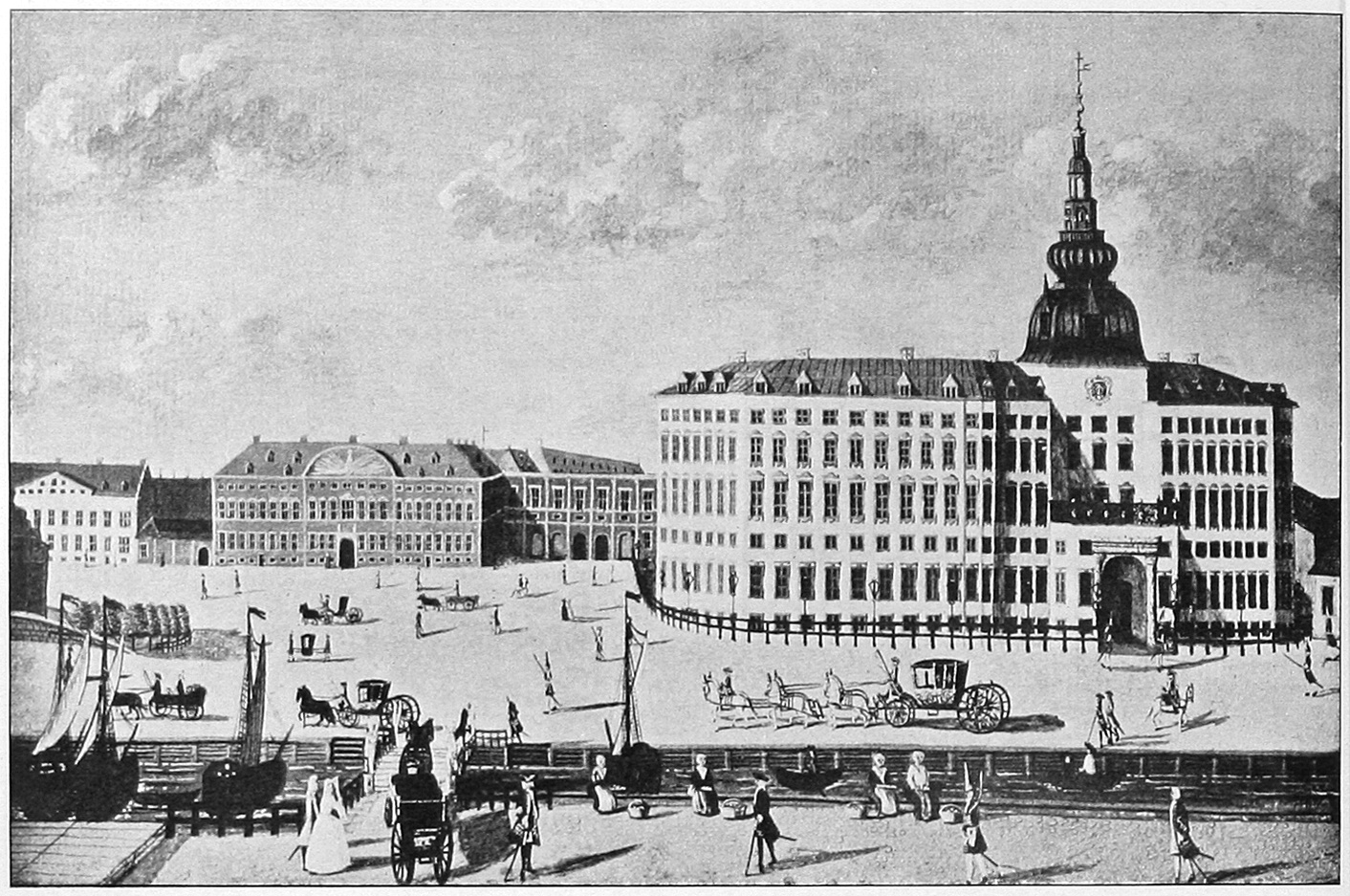
The rebuilt Copenhagen Castle about 1730 with the new Chancellery building to the left and the passageway linking the two buildings

During the reign of King Frederick IV, a magnificent administration building was constructed in 1716-21 next to the palace adjacent to the Supply Depot. This new building was to house the chancelleries, thus replacing the previous chancellery building situated by the canal. The new chancellery building was connected to the castle by an arched passageway, thus allowing the king to stay in close contact with his government. The Chancellery Building (also known as the Red Building or the Building of Colleges) has functioned as the heart of the central administration for almost 300 years, and is today used by the Ministry of Finance.

In spite of many attempts and projects to replace the small and antiquated castle with a more up-to-date royal residence fit for an absolute king, the old castle continued to exist well into the 18th century. Several renovations were made, most notably by Frederick IV in 1721-29. This rebuilding thoroughly changed the irregular appearance of the castle to a more regular shape.

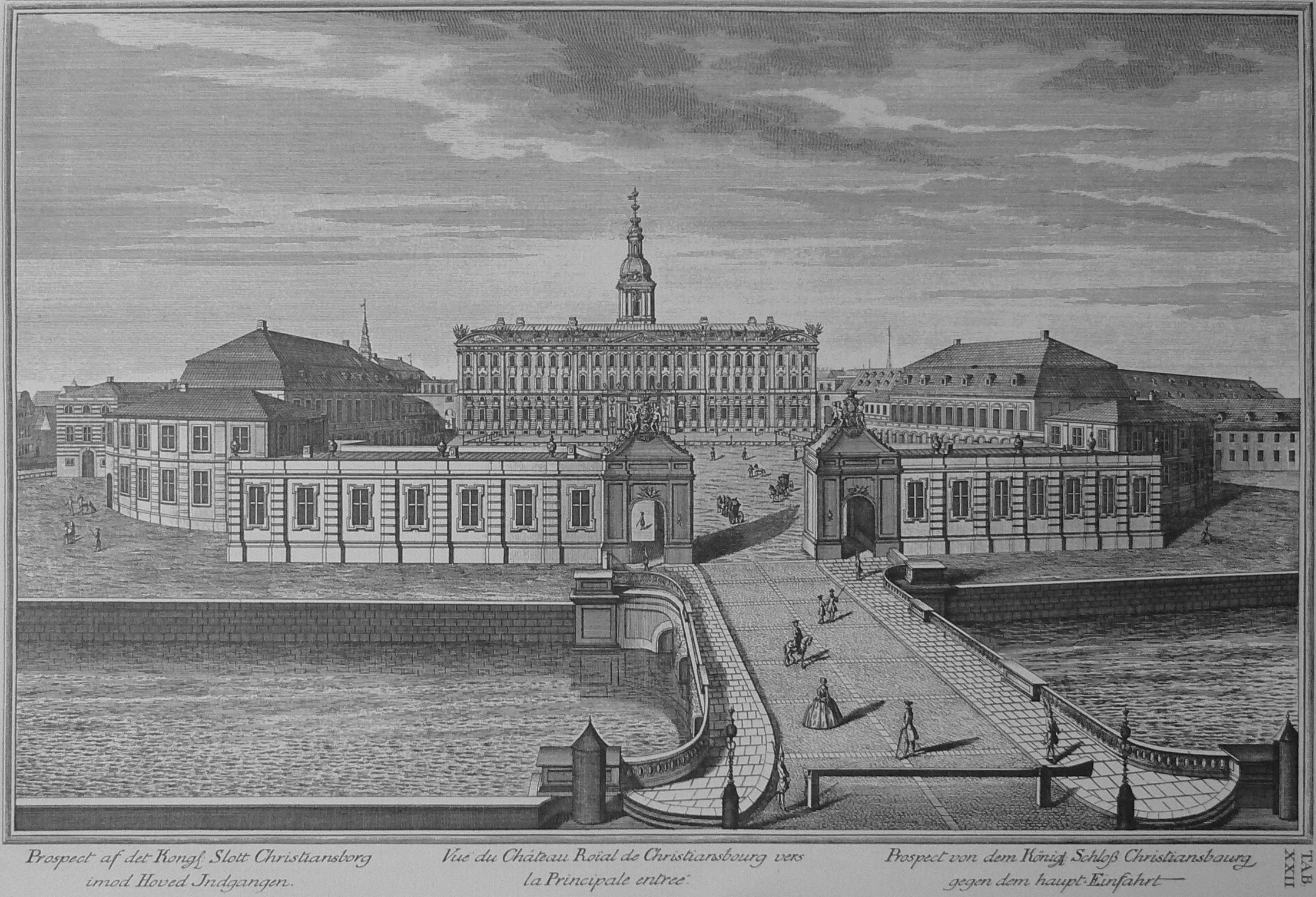
The first Christiansborg Palace, engraved illustration in Lauritz de Thurahs Den Danske Vitruvius from 1746

However, just two years after the rebuilding was completed, the Copenhagen Castle was demolished in 1731 to give room for three consecutive Christiansborg Palaces, the two first of which were destroyed by fires (in 1794 and 1884). Parts of the first and second Christianborg Palace still remain and is integrated in the present palace. The ruins of Absalon's Castle and the Copenhagen Castle are excavated and at display today under the present Christiansborg.

== Notable buildings ==
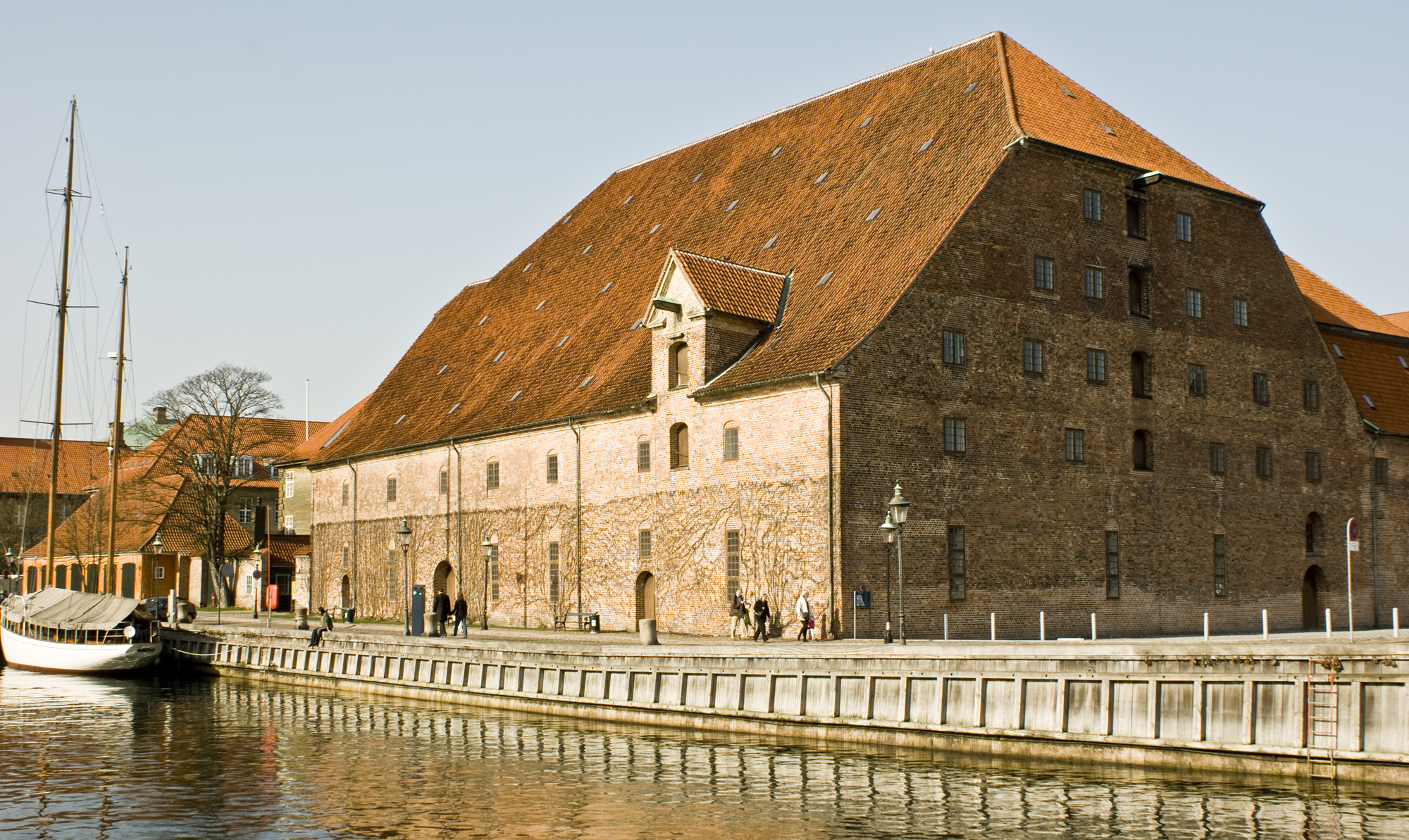
Christian IV's Brewhouse

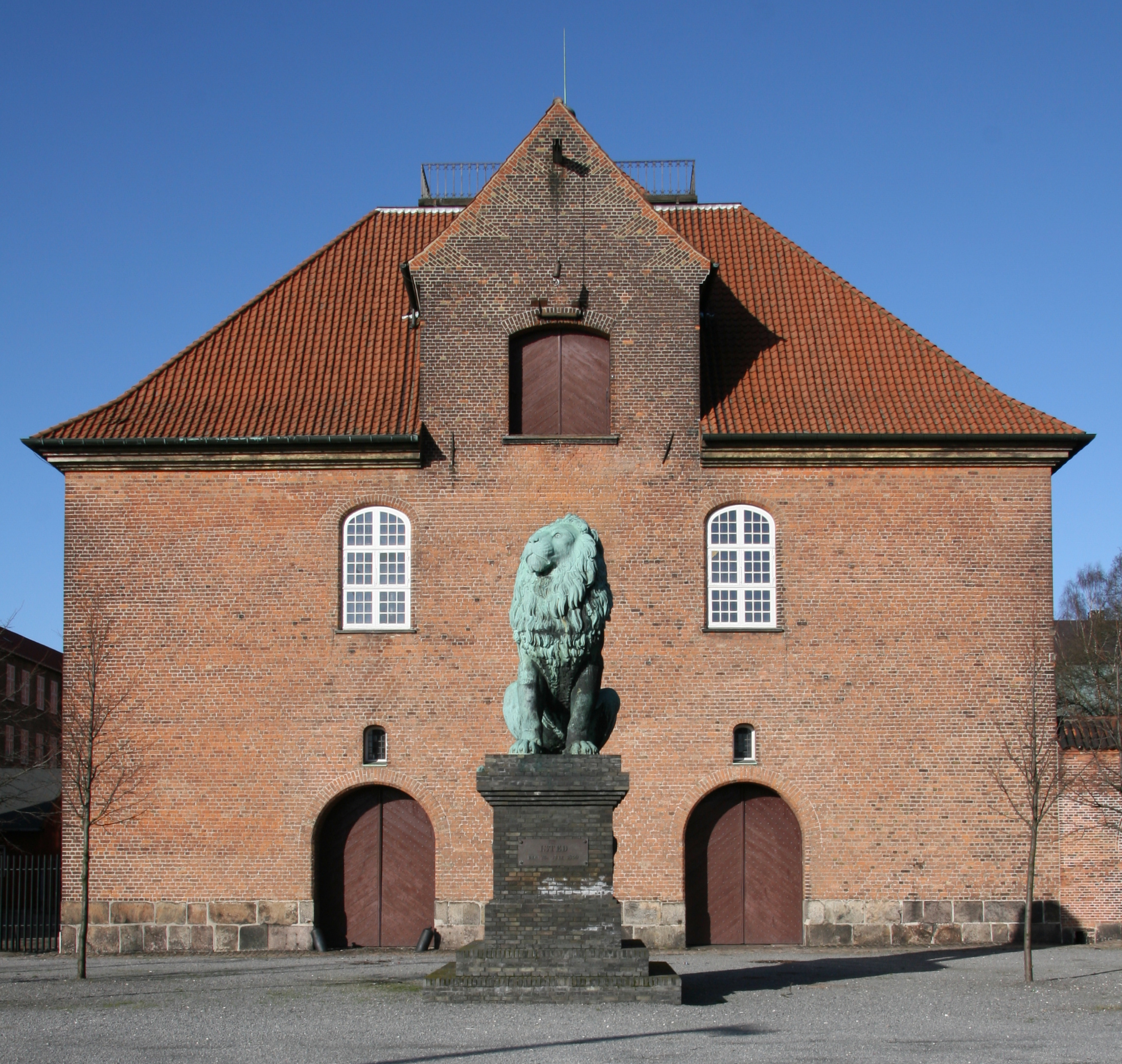
Christian IV's Arsenal

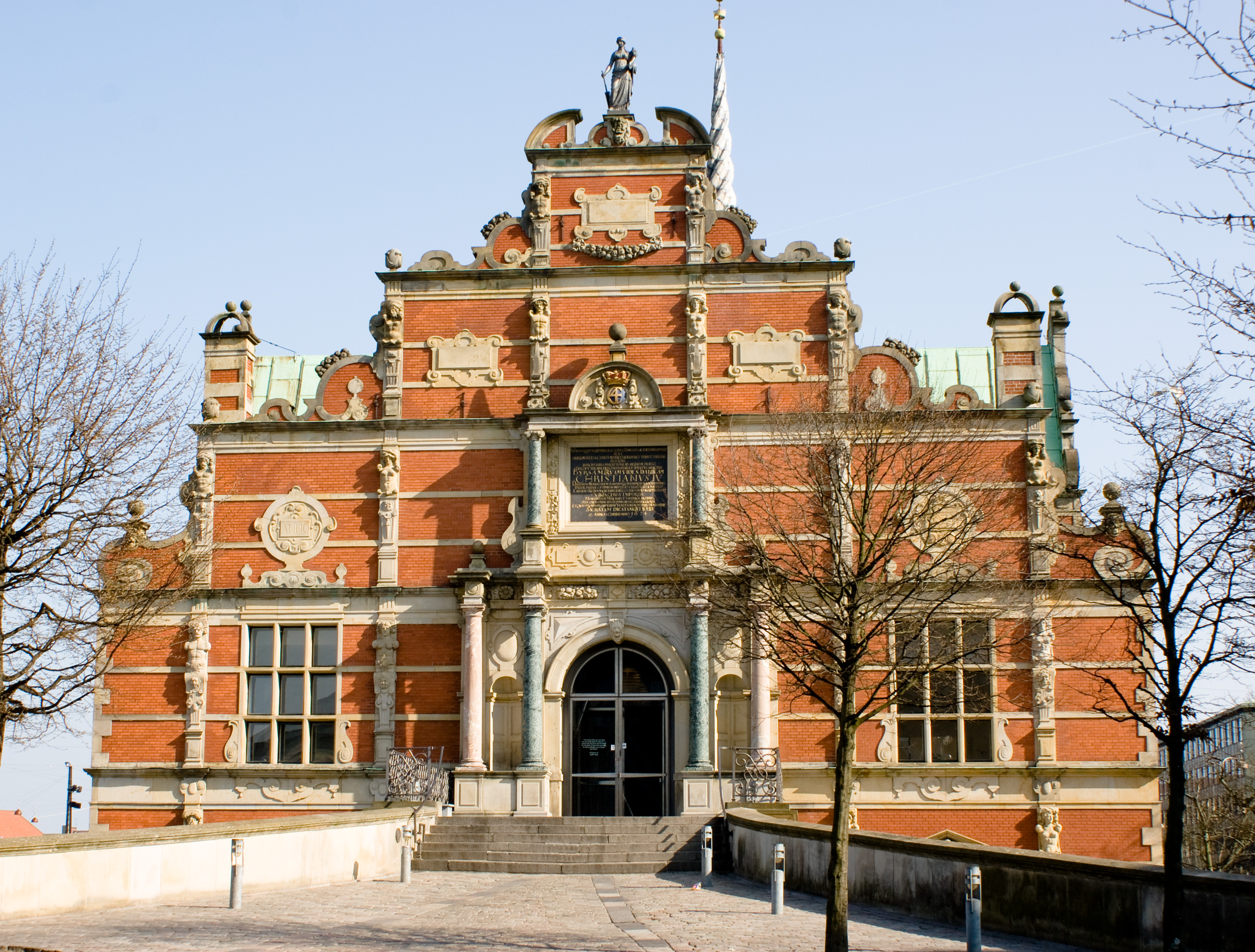
The entrance to Christian IV's Stock exchange on Slotsholmen

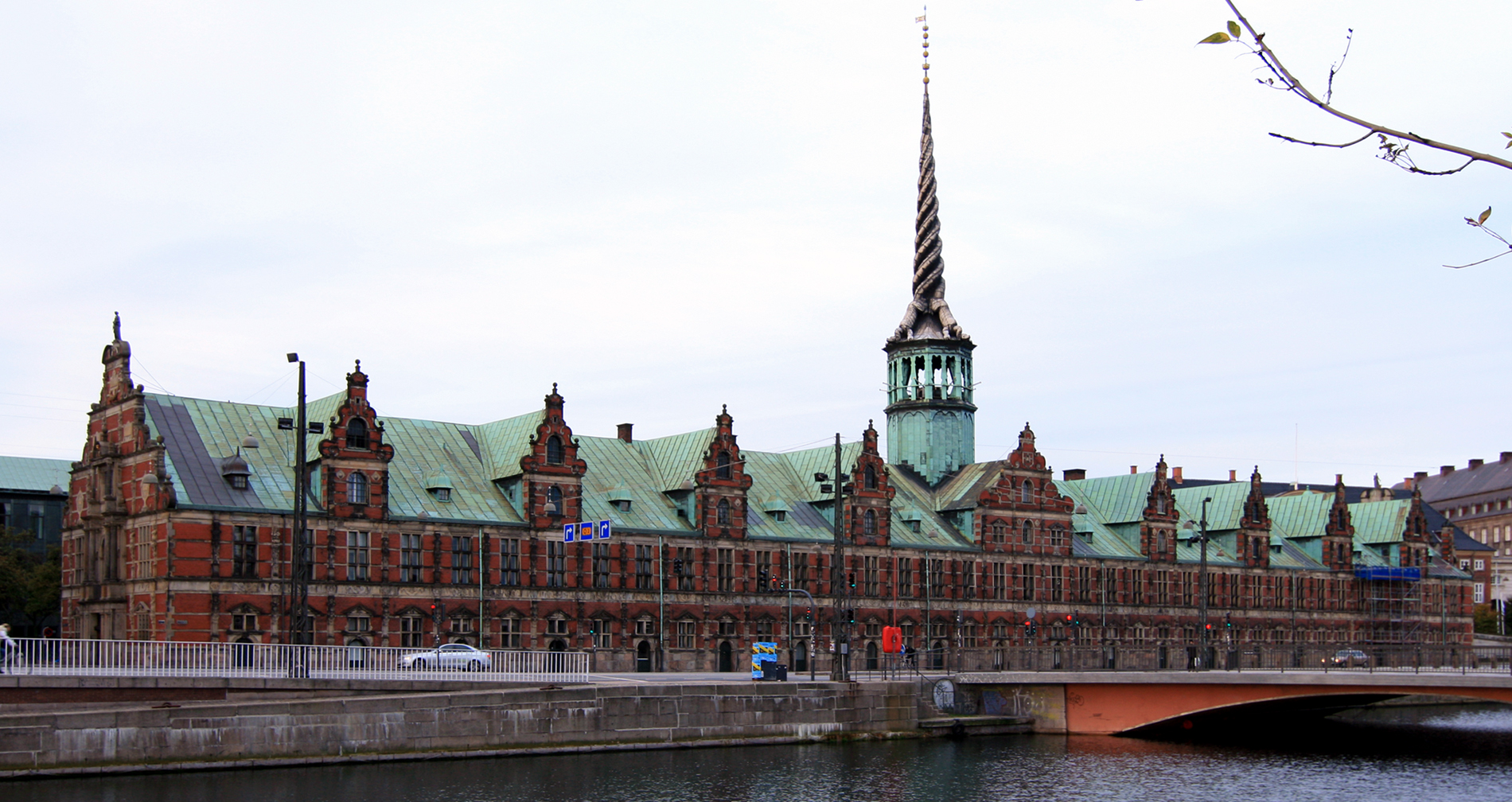
Christian IV's Stock Exchange

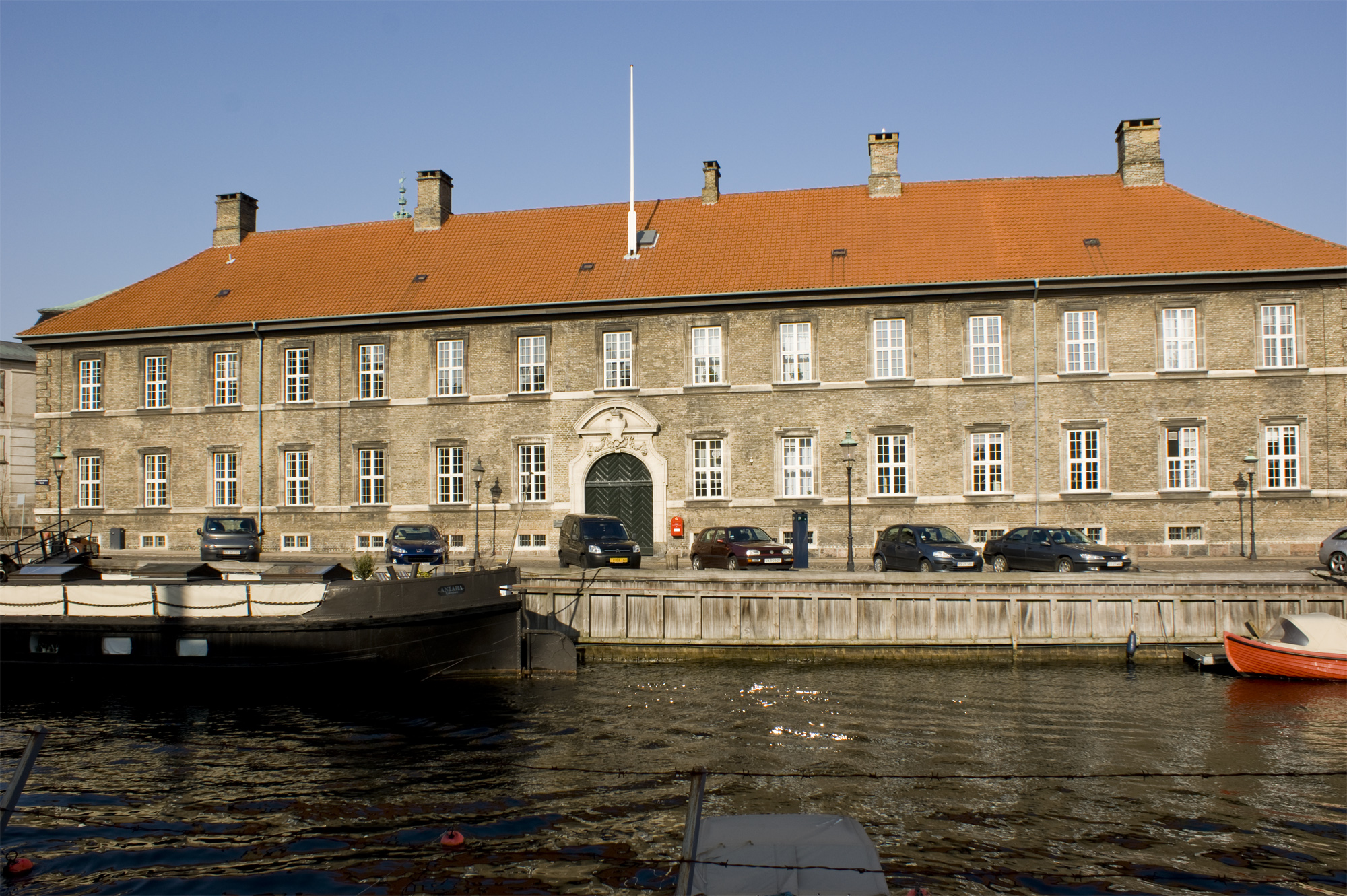
The Ministry of Education

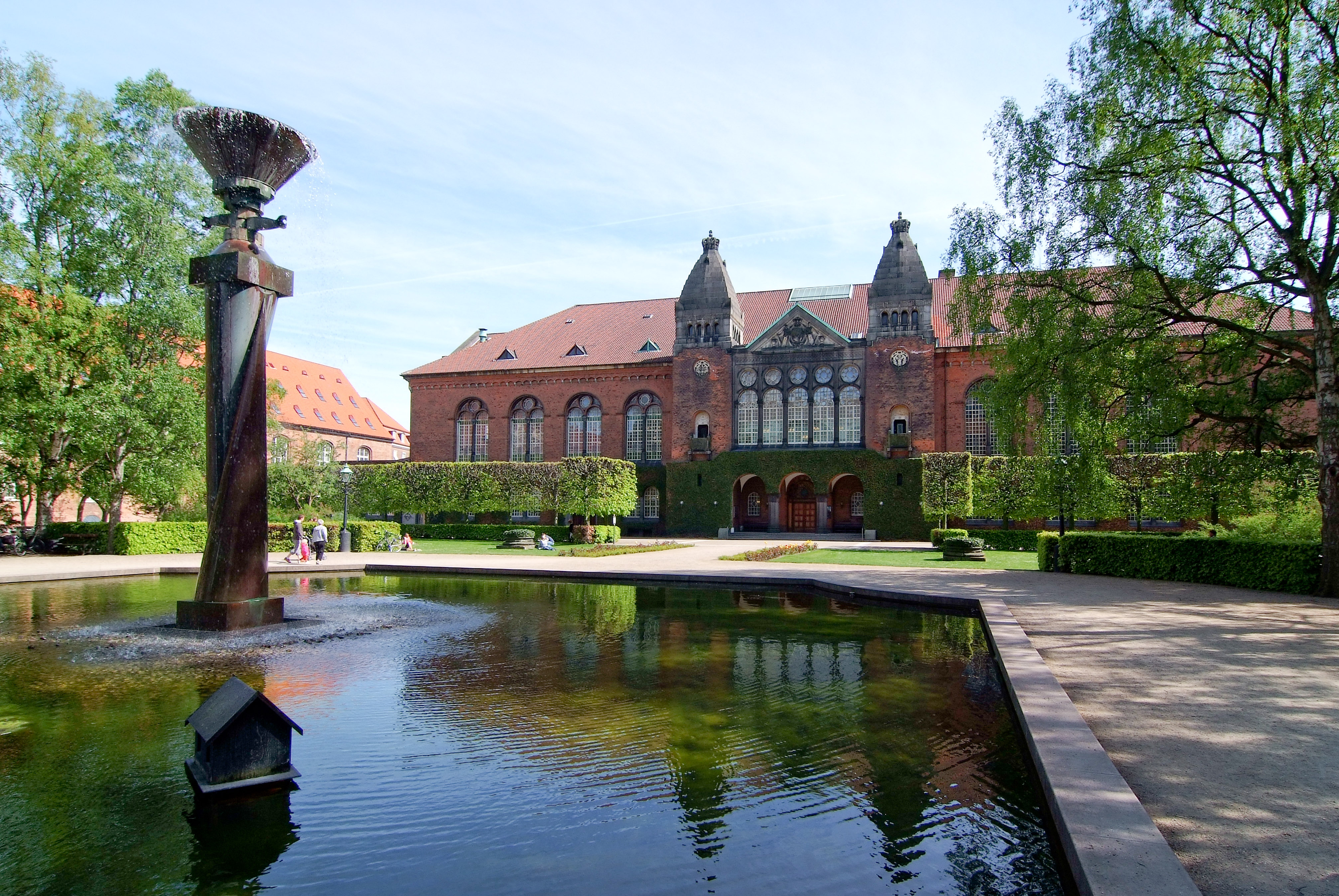
Royal Danish Library, Old Building, seen from the Library Garden

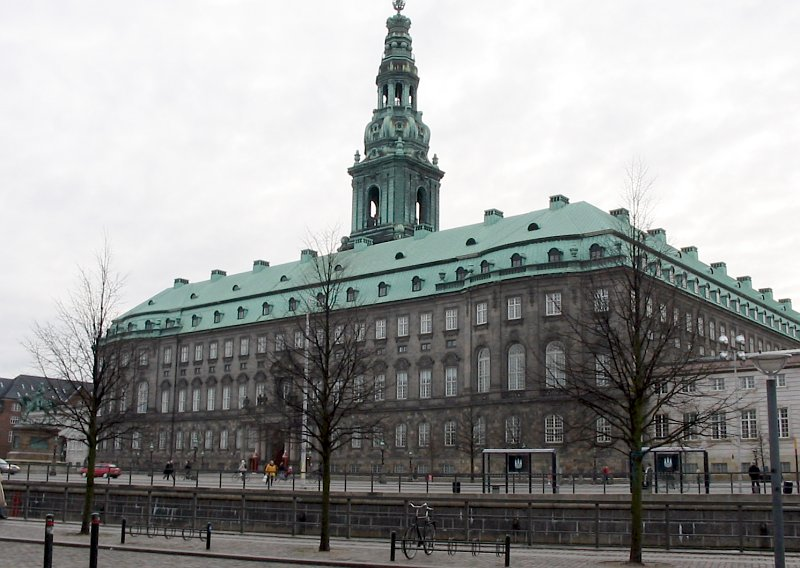
Christiansborg Palace

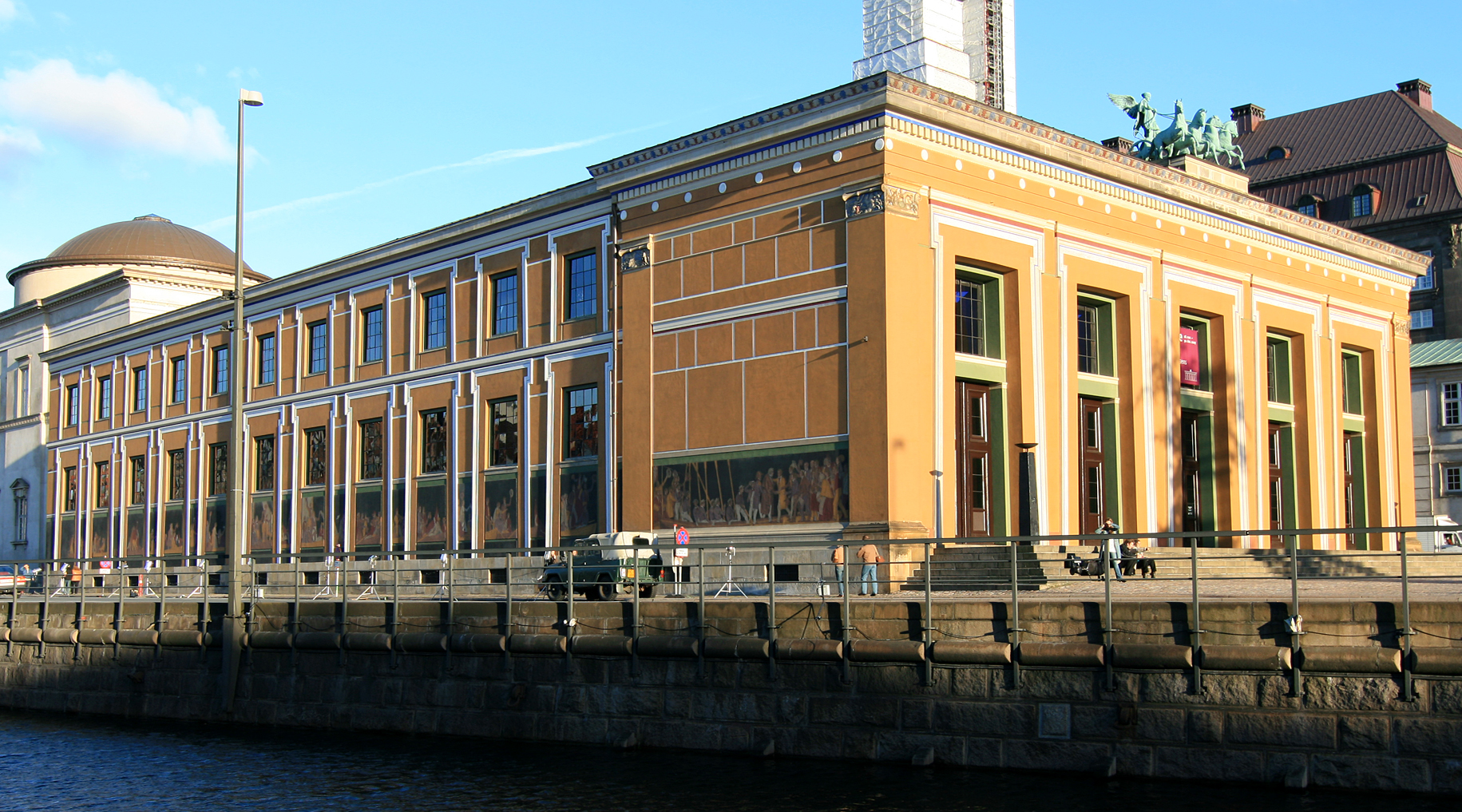
Thorvaldsens Museum

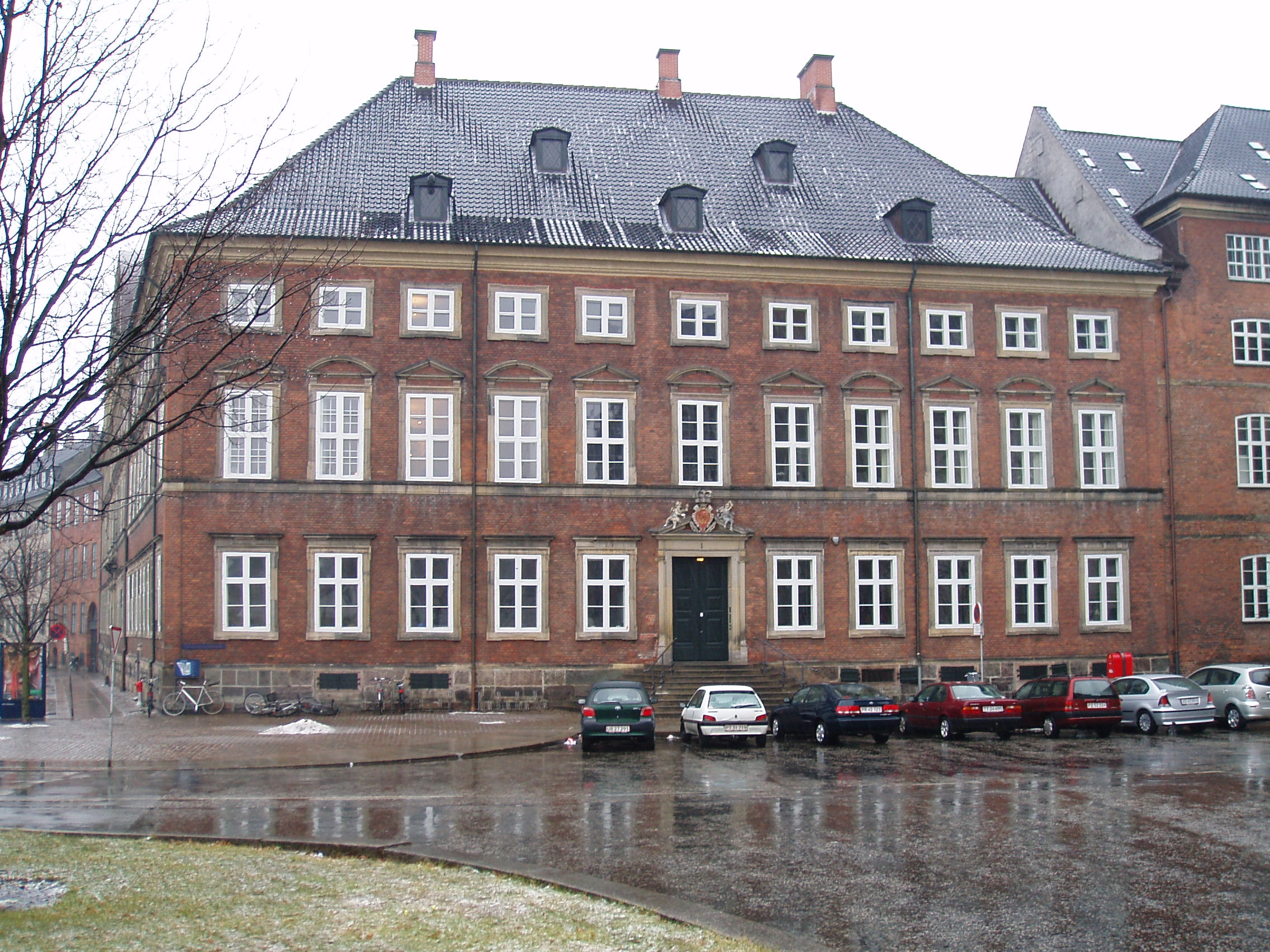
The side façade of the Chancellery building

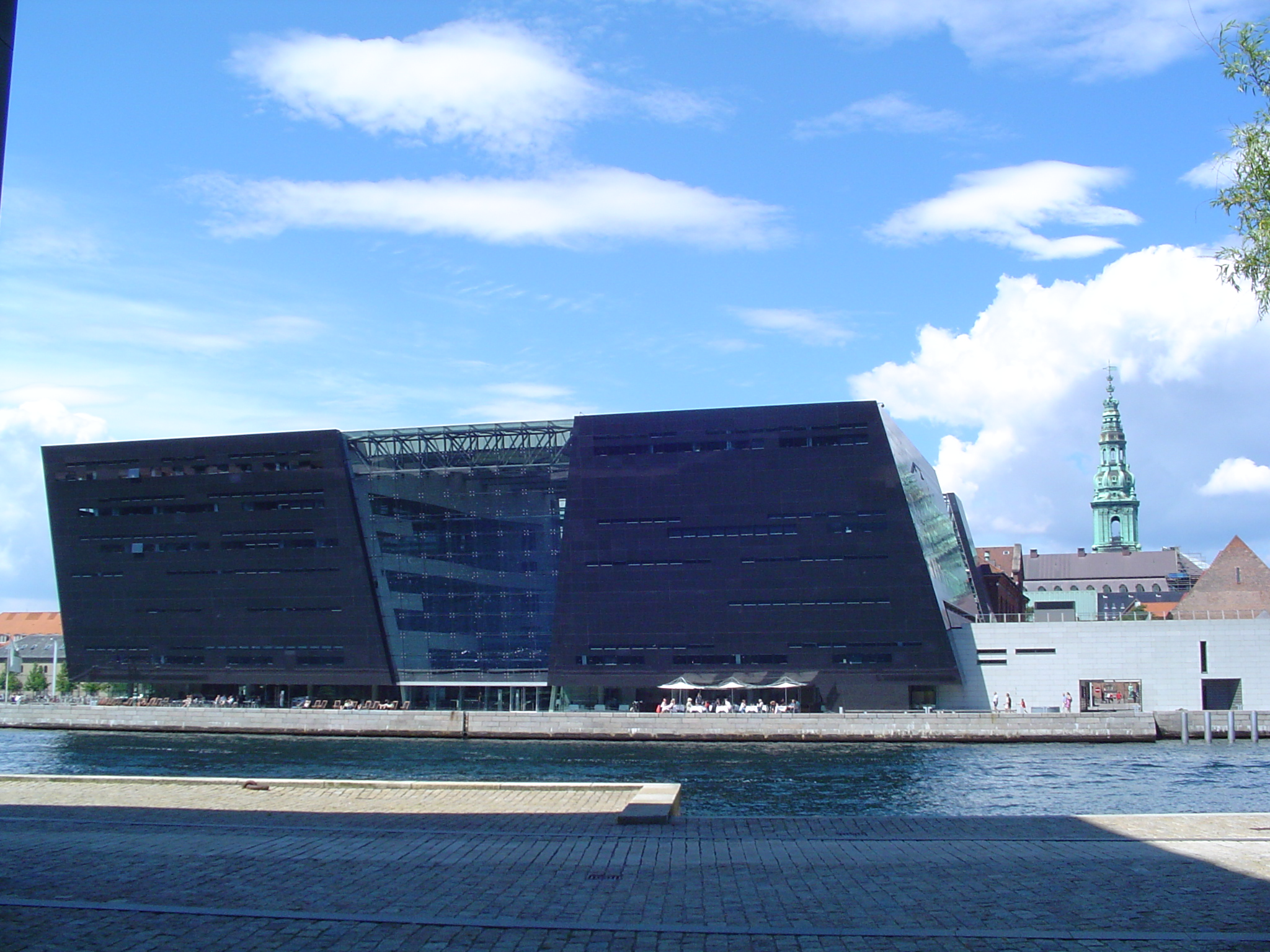
Black Diamond extension to the Royal Danish Library

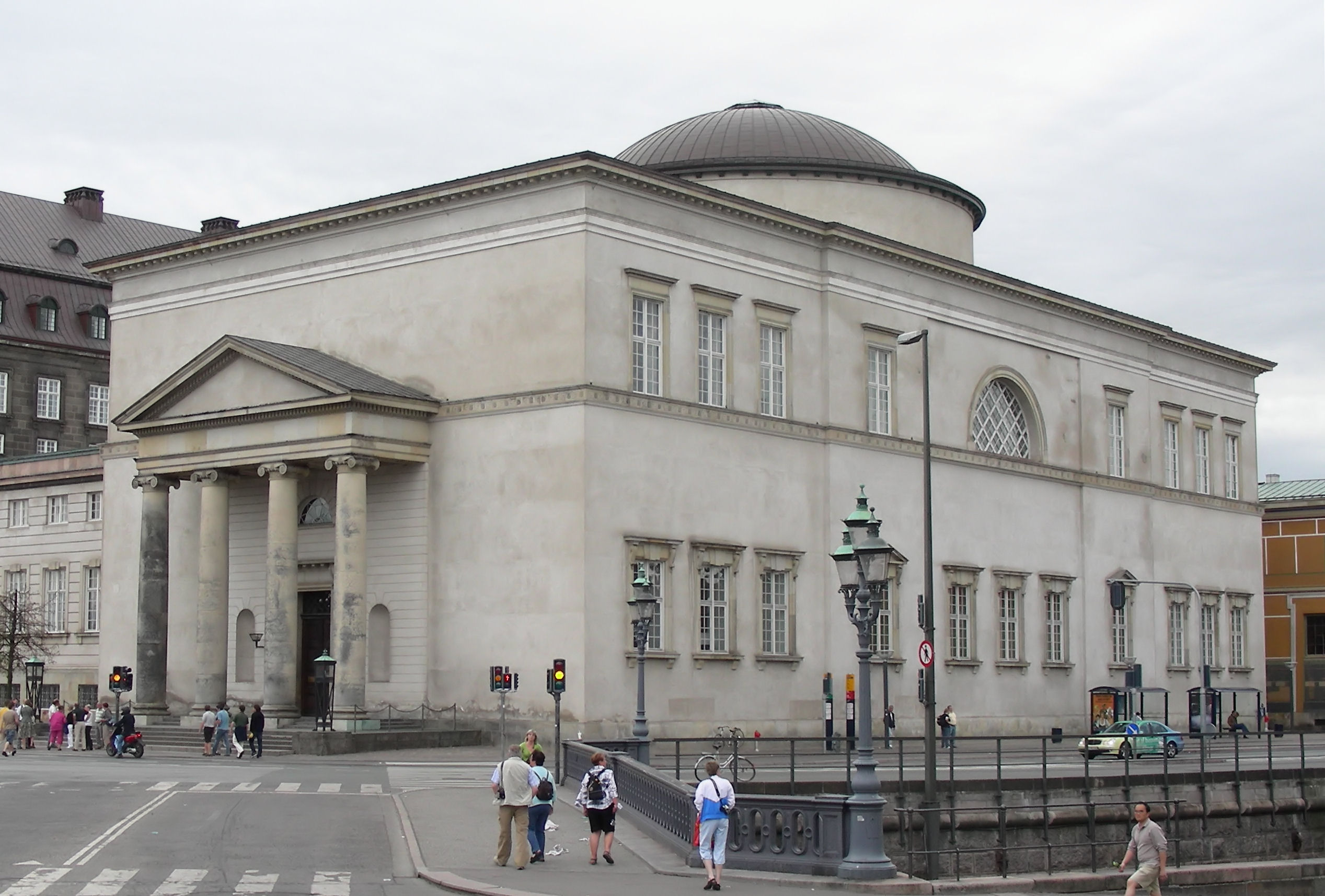
Christiansborg Palace Chapel

== Bridges ==
Slotsholmen is surrounded partly by Copenhagen's Inner Harbour, partly by canals. Nine bridges connect Slotsholmen to the rest of Copenhagen, both Zealand-side and Amager-side.

=== Knippelsbro ===
Knippelsbro is a bascule bridge and one of several bridges over Copenhagen's Inner Harbour; others being Langebro, Lille Langebro, Bryggebroen and Copenhagen's Inner Harbour Bridge. It connects Slotsholmen to Christianshavn by extending Børsgade to Torvegade.

=== Marmorbroen ===
Marmorbroen (English: The Marble Bridge) connects Christiansborg Riding Ground Complex to Ny Vestergade that continues to Dantes Plads with the Ny Carlsberg Glyptotek. The bridge was constructed from 1739-45. It has a sandstone cladding with medallion ornamentation on the sides while the top is covered with marble.

=== Stormbroen ===
Stormbroen (English: The Assault Bridge) is a small arch bridge in stone, connecting Stormgade (towards The City Hall Square) with Vindebrogade on Slotsholmen.

The bridge is named after the Assault on Copenhagen in 1659. It was at this very spot, where the city ramparts at that time was located, that the Swedish troops made their principal attack. After a series of defeats, the Danish troops finally gained victory, the Swedish troops leaving 2,000 dead soldiers in front of the ramparts at Stormgade.

Various sources state that the bridge was erected in 1681 but on the side the inscription "erected in MDCLX is carved into its stone foundation. The bridge was renovated by Martin Nyrop in 1918.

=== Højbro ===
Højbro (English: High Bridge) is an arch bridge in wrought iron, connecting Højbro Square with Slotsholmen. It is designed by Vilhelm Dahlerup and was built in 1878. Holmens Bro and Børsbroen also used to be the work of Dahlerup but these have both been replaced.

The current bridge is not high at all. The name goes back to the wooden bascule bridge that was the first bridge to Slotsholmen.

=== Holmens Bro ===
Holmens Bro is an arch bridge built in granite in 1954 to replace Dahlerup's design from 1878.

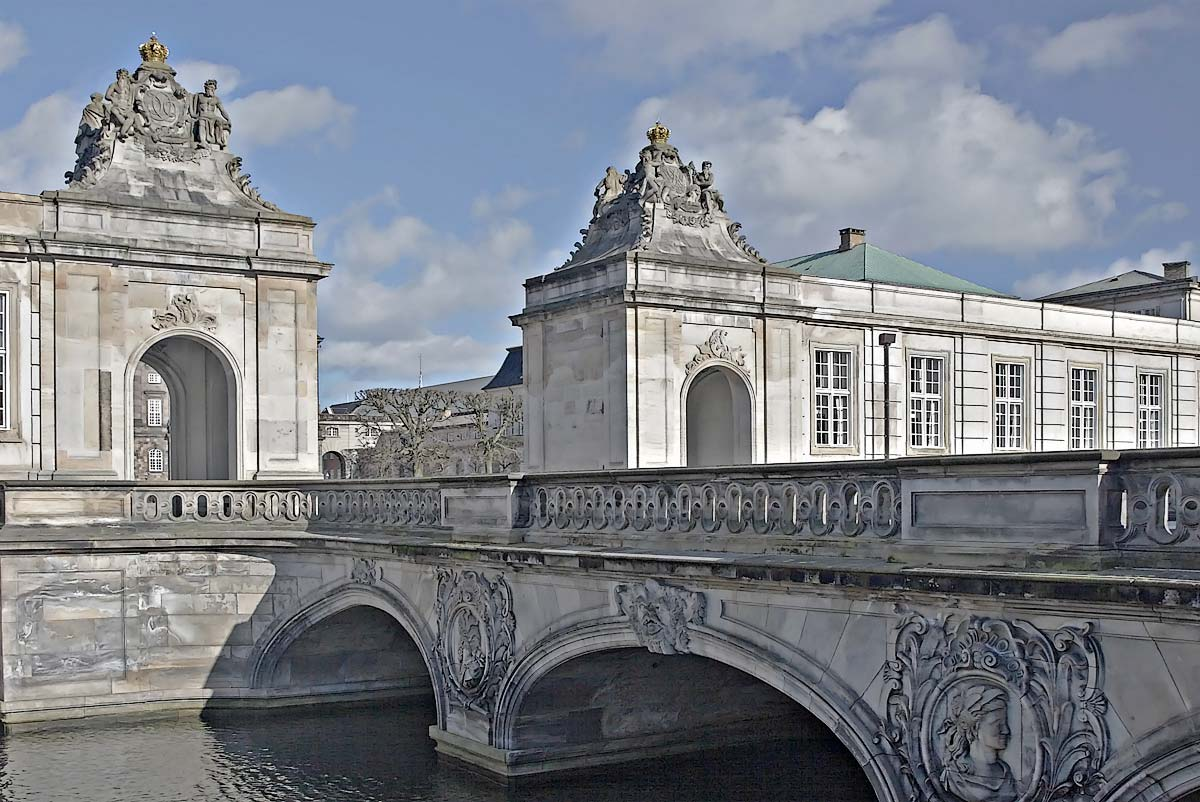
The Marble Bridge as seen from Frederiksholm Canal

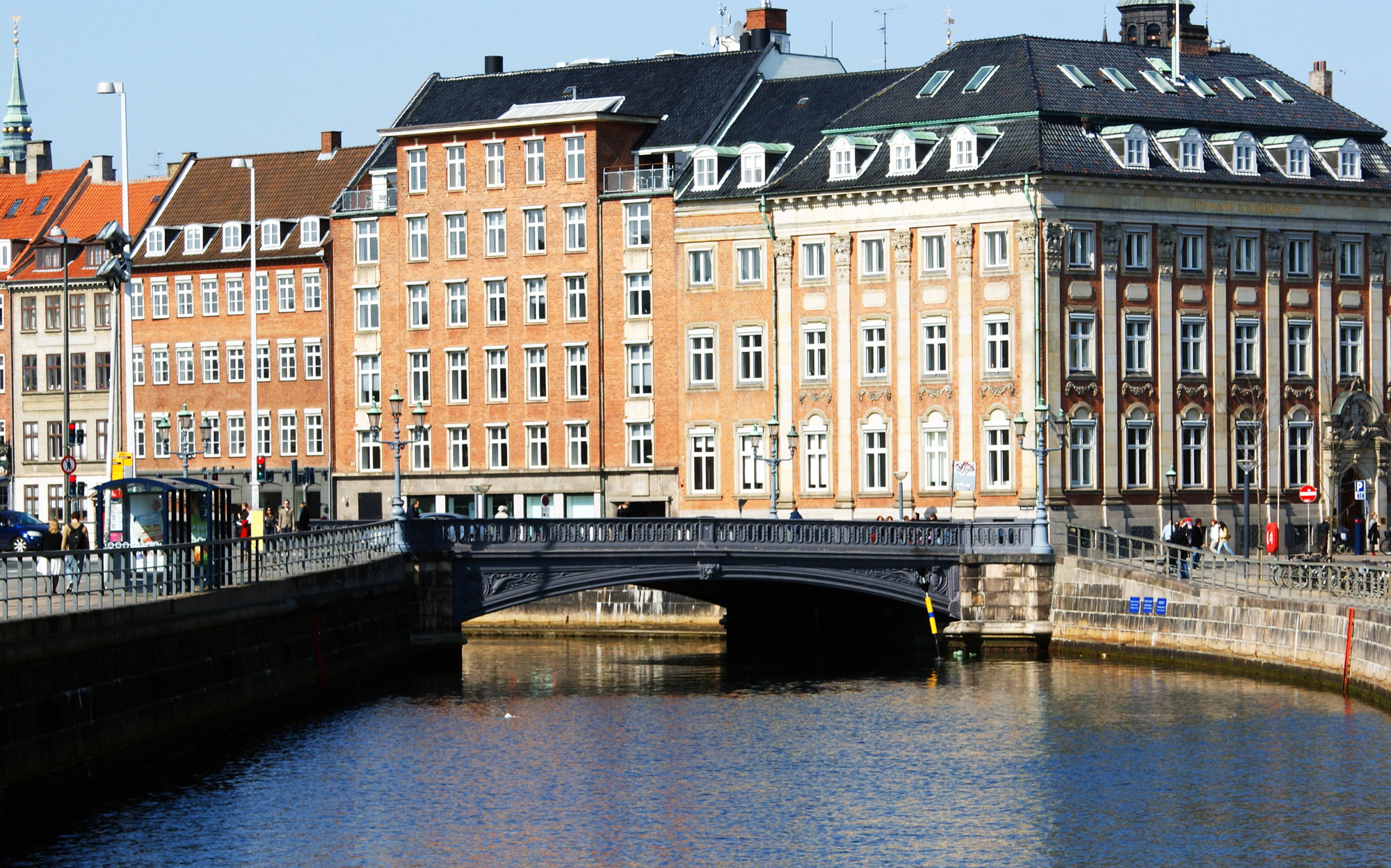
Højbro connecting Højbro Square to Slotsholmen

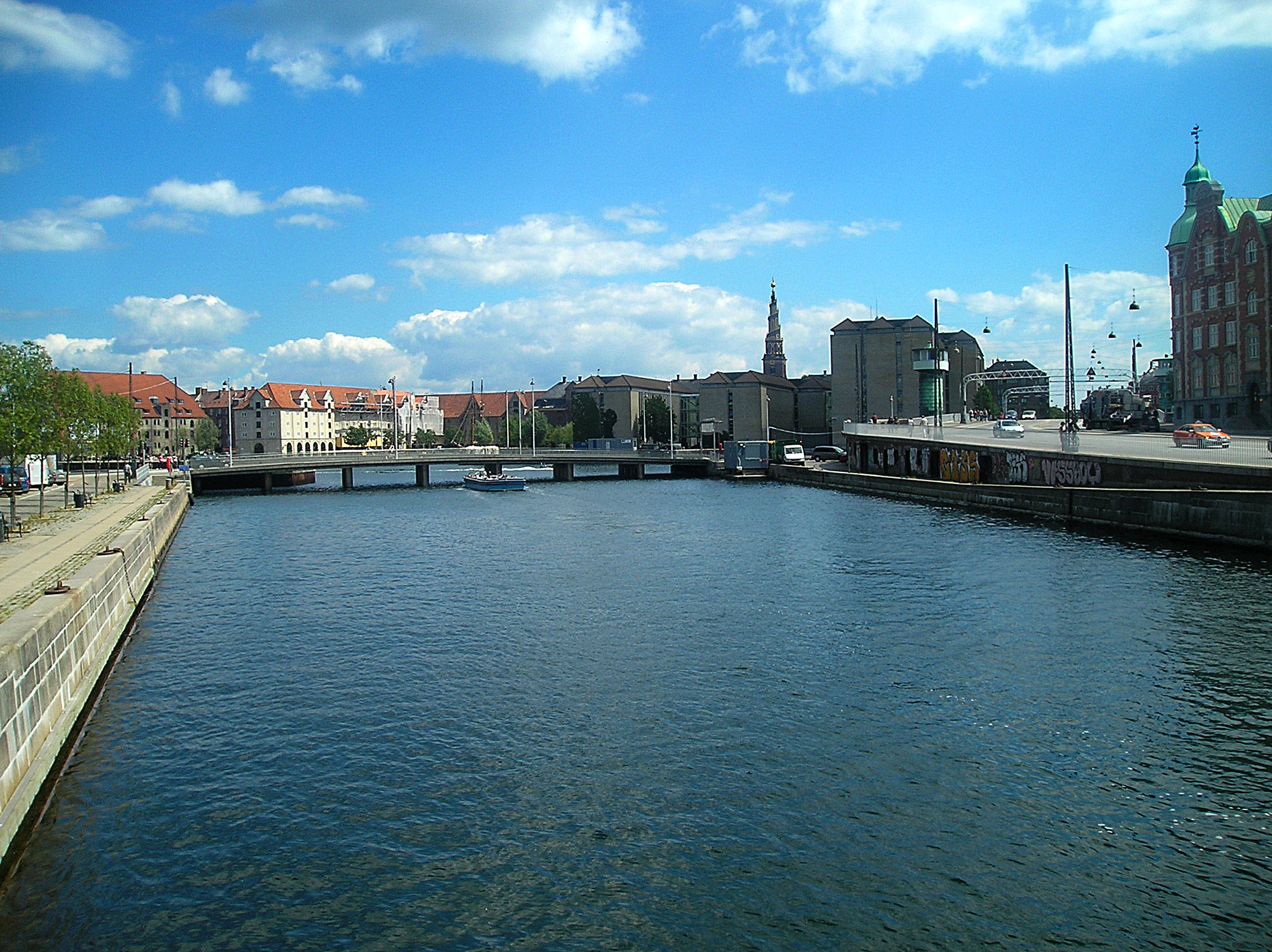
Christian IV's Bro

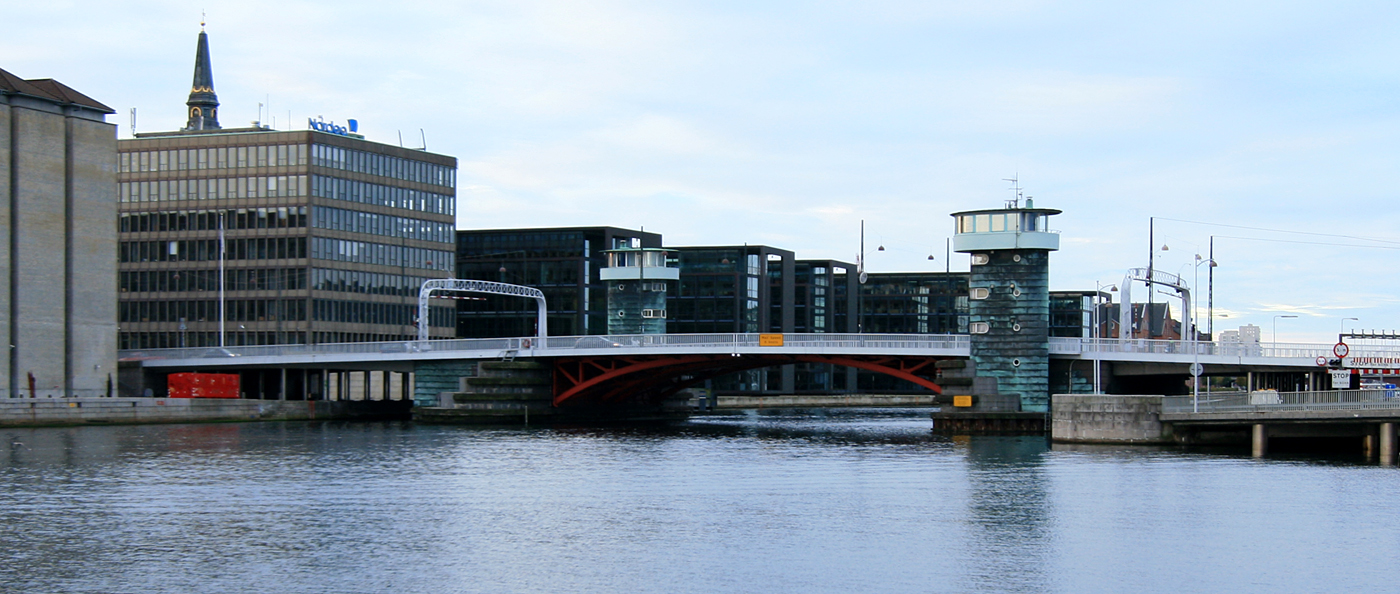
Knippelsbro

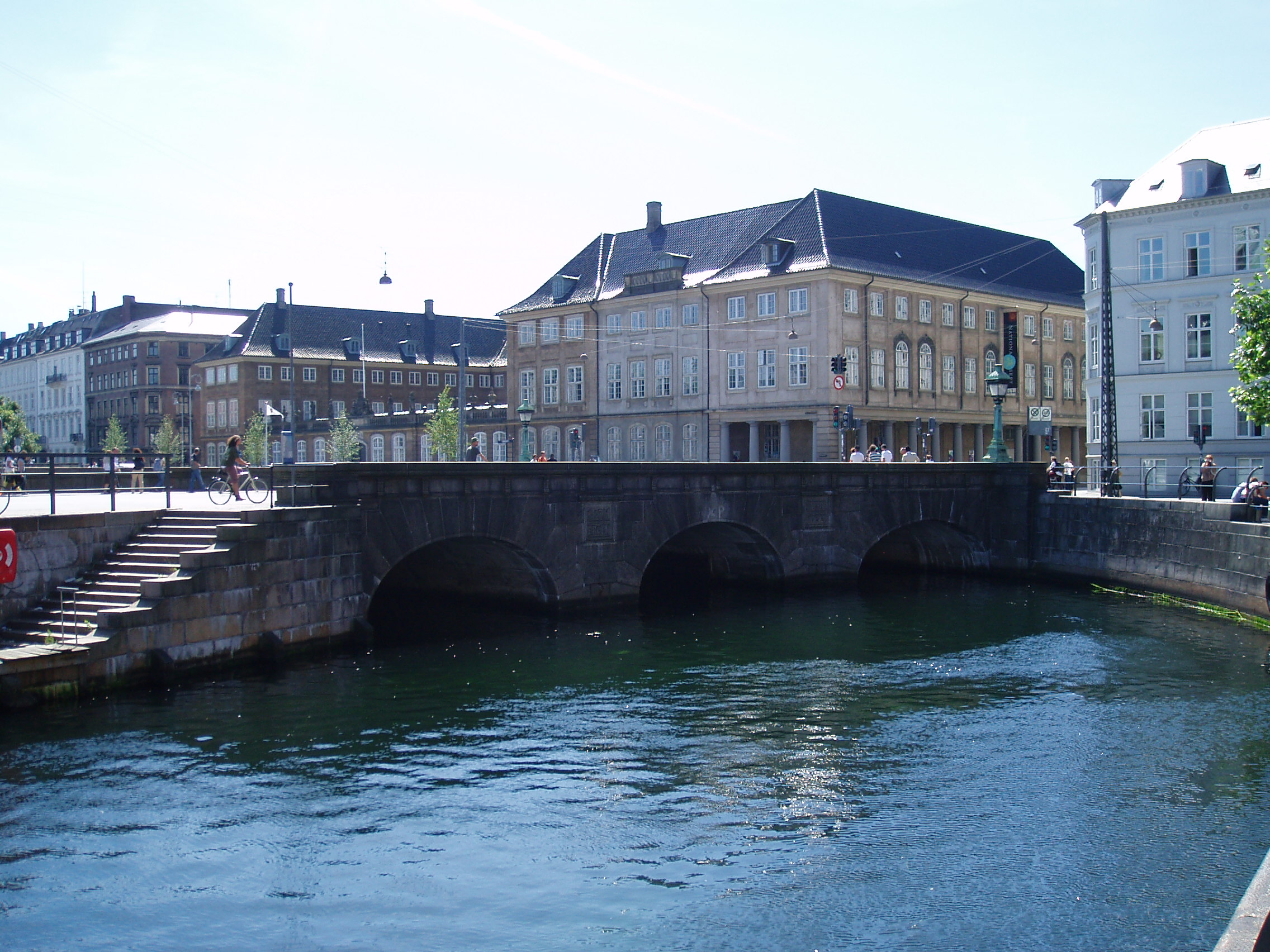
Stormbroen

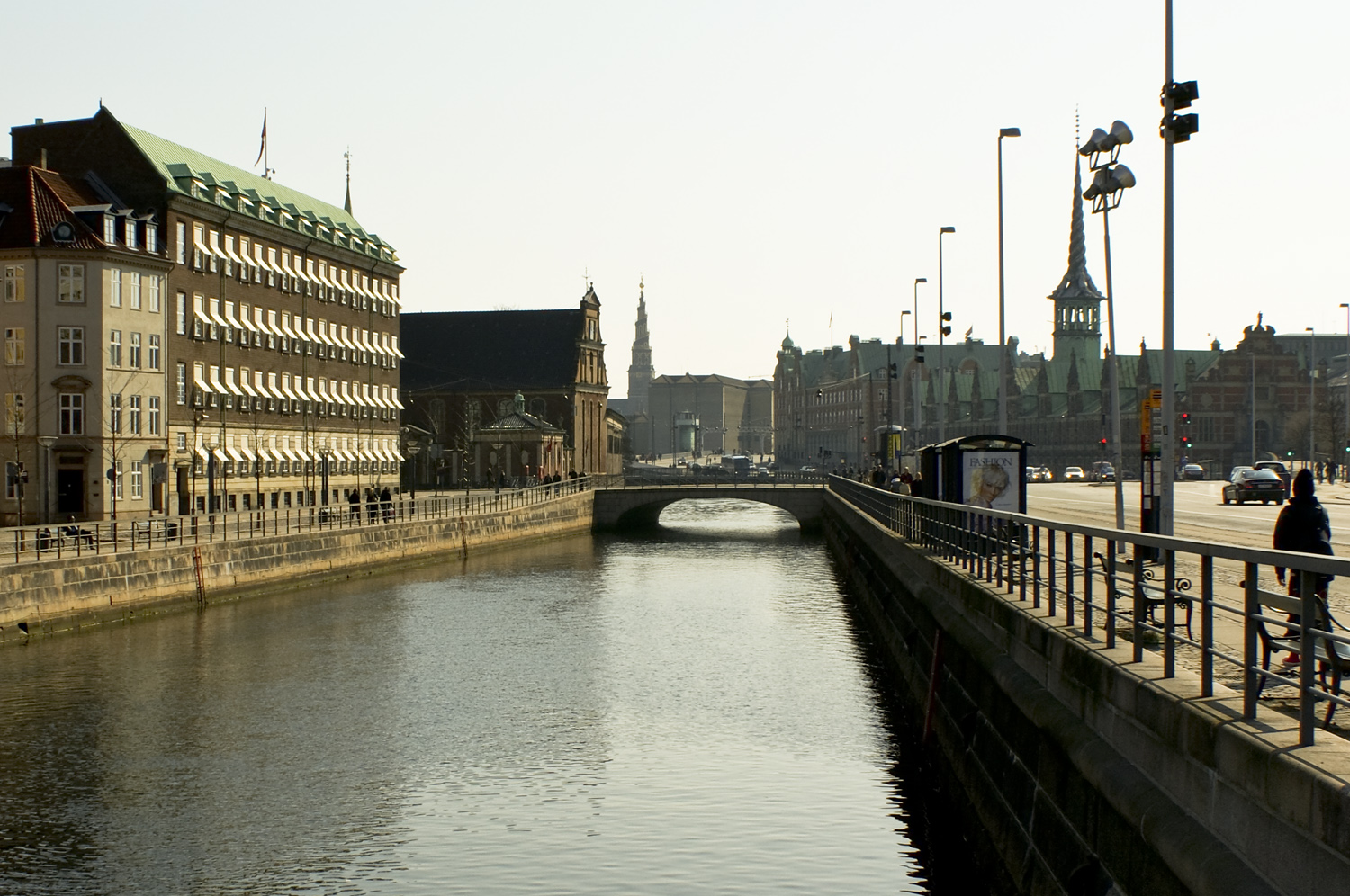
Holmens Bro

== Round Christiansborg Open Water Swim ==
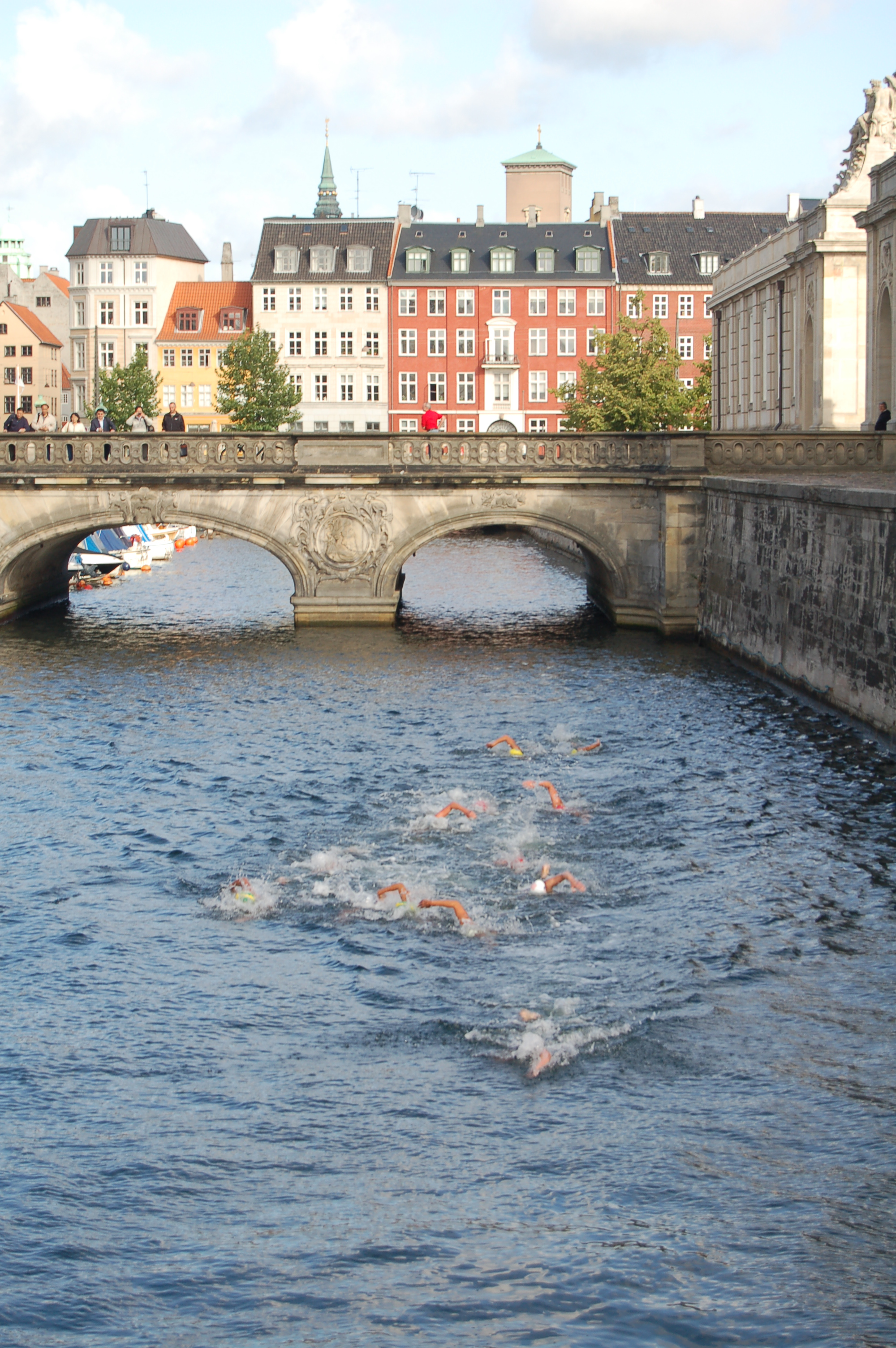
Swimmers in Frederiksholms Canal during the Round Christiansborg swim 2009

Since efforts to improve water quality in Copenhagen Harbour has made the water clean enough to allow swimming, an open-water swimming competition around Slotsholmen has been revitalized.

With the course being 2,000 metres, the 10,000 metre race involves five loops. There is both a competition for amateurs who swim in the afternoon and a FINA 10 km (6 mi) Marathon Swimming World Cup event with US$11,000 in prize money that takes place in the morning. The swim takes place in August and water temperatures are 18-22 °C.

The nature of the course makes it unusually good for spectators and that combined with the historical surroundings have gained it a reputation as one of the best open water swim competitions in Europe.

== See also ==
- Districts of Copenhagen
- List of islands of Denmark
- Slotsholmskanalen
