= Stadsgraven =

Canal in Copenhagen

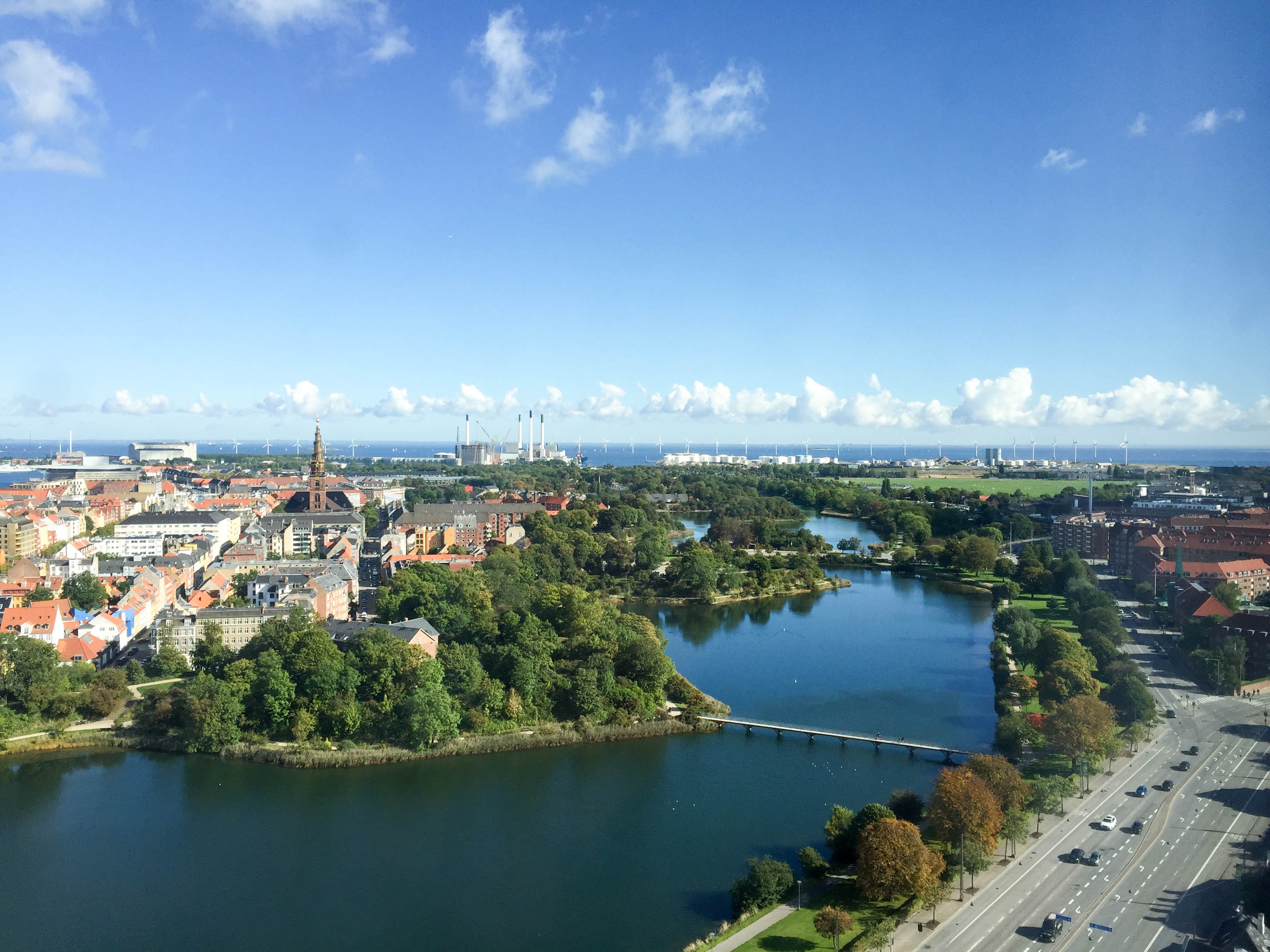
- Interactive map of Stadsgraven
- Location: Copenhagen, Denmark

Geography
- Beginning coordinates: 55°40′11″N 12°34′57″E
- Ending coordinates: 55°41′13″N 12°36′39″E

Stadsgraven is the canal which separates Christianshavn from the rest of Amager in Copenhagen, Denmark. It was originally a moat located in front of the Christianshavn Rampart as part of the city's Bastioned Ring Fortifications.

== History ==
Stadsgraven was created when Christianshavn was constructed in the shallow waters off Amager in the early 17th century. Apart from the main Stads canal, there is a parallel Inner Stadsgraven along its northern portion. Stadsgraven is connected to the main harbour both north and south of Christianshavn.

There are four causeways and two footbridges across Stadsgraven. The principal crossing is located at the site of the former Amagerport, one of the city's four no longer existent city gates, and connects Torvegade, the main thoroughfare of Christianshavn, to Amagerbrogade, the main shopping street of Amager Side Copenhagen. Another dam is located at the southern mouth of the canal where it passes below Kalbebod Bastion, the southernmost of Christianshavn Rampart's 12 bastions. The last two dams are located at the other end of the canal at Holmen.

The two footbridges are located on each their side of Torvegade. The northern one, Dyssebroen, is located within the Freetown Christiania. The other one is an unnamed bridge located at The Panter's Bastion, roughly opposite the Radisson Blu Scandinavia Hotel, the tallest building in the area.

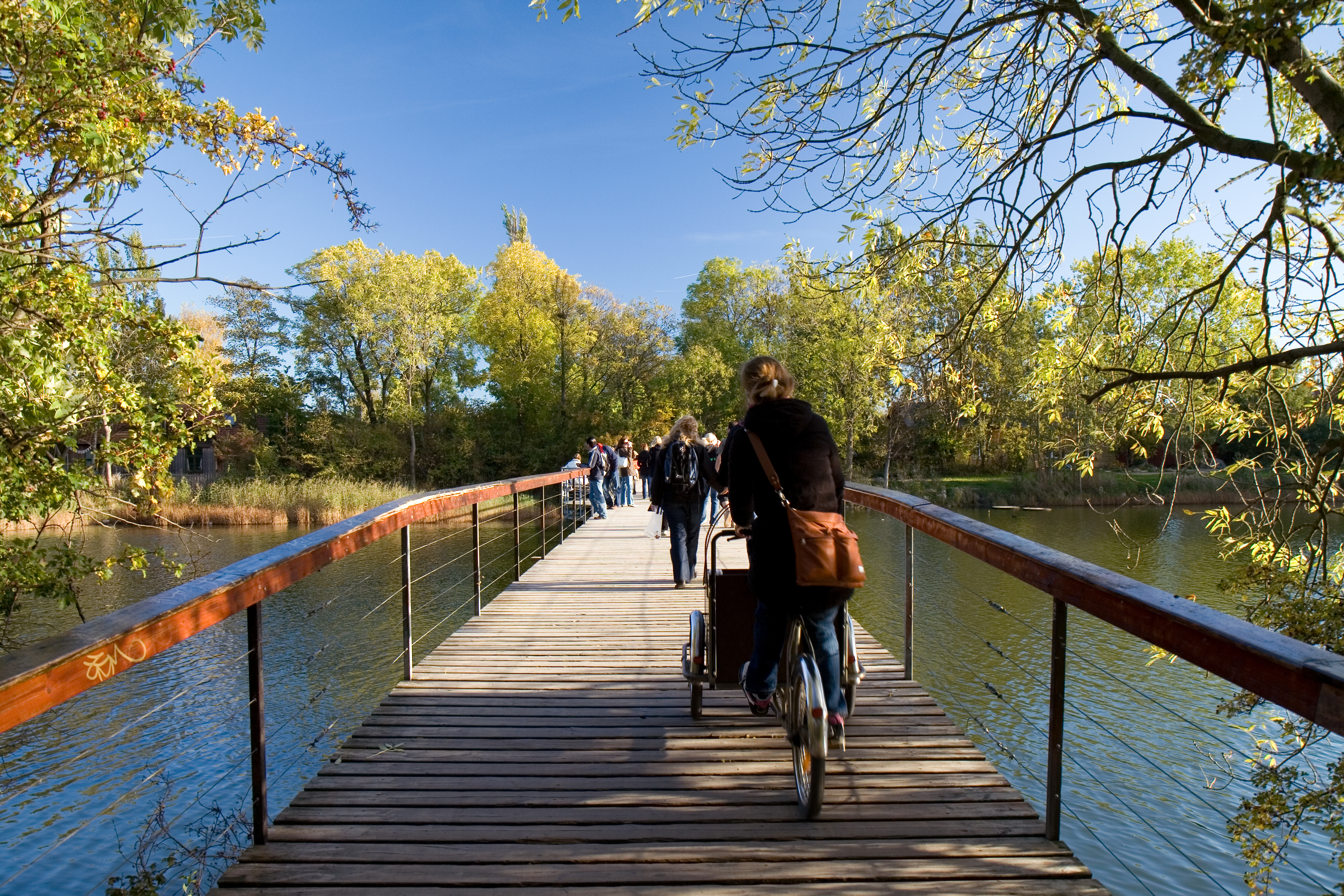
Dyssebroen

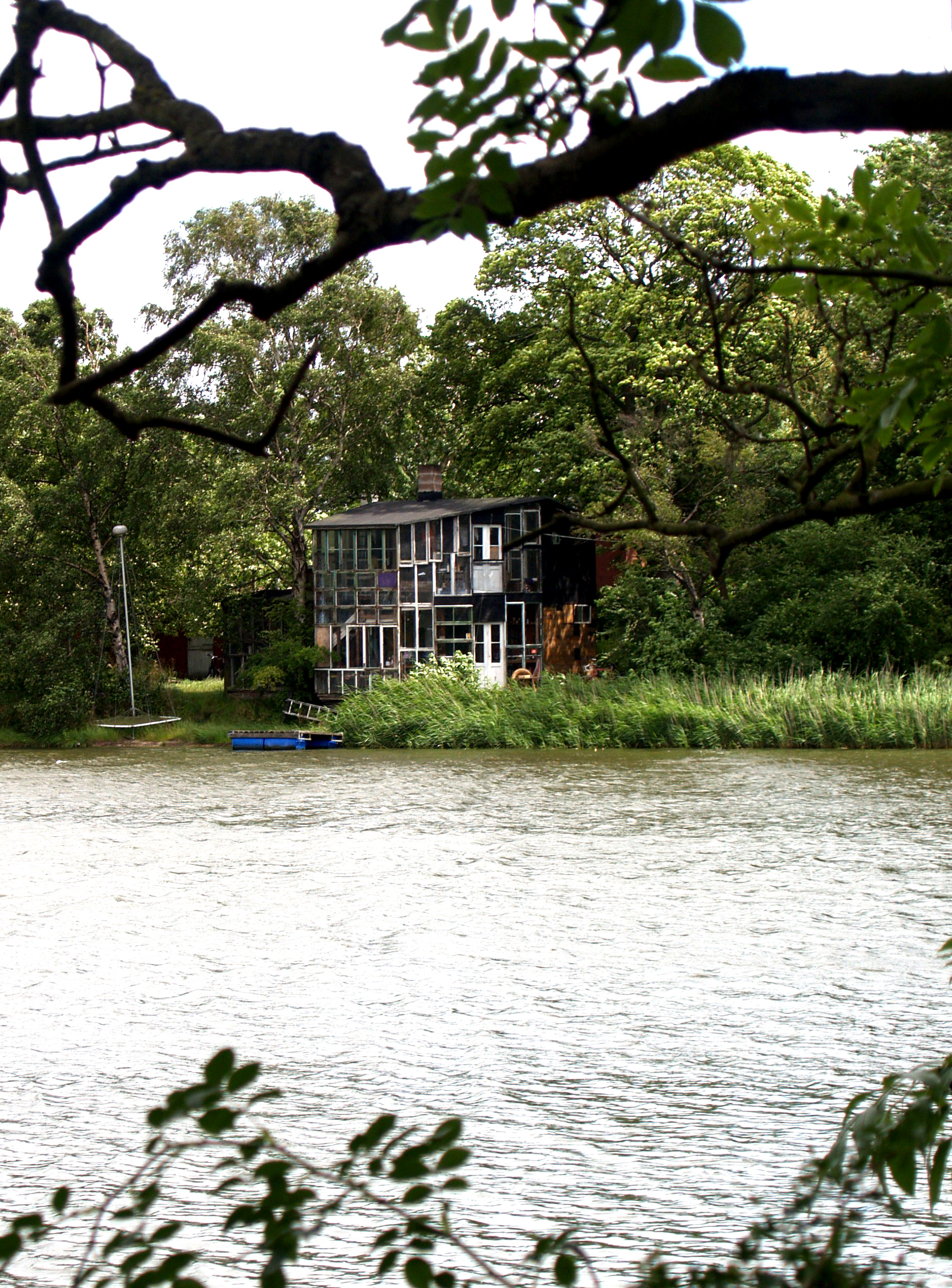
Glass House, Christiania

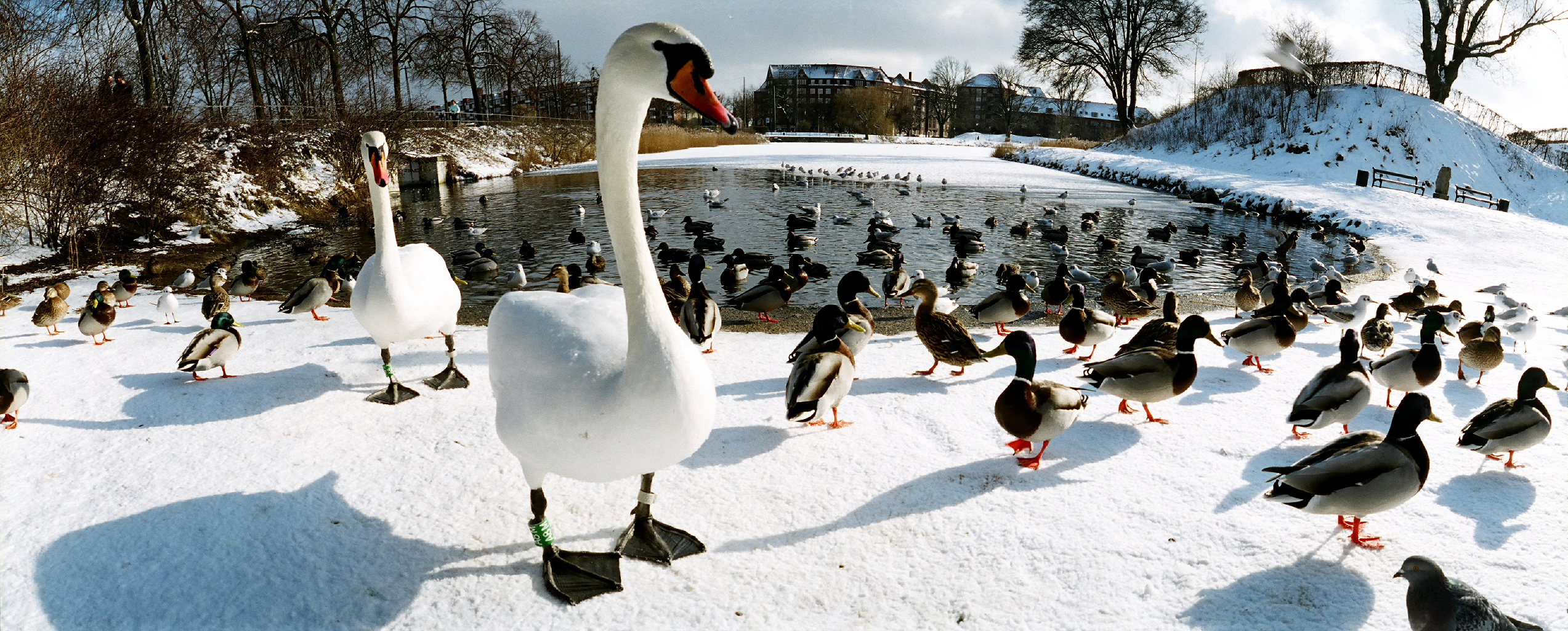
Waterfowl in wintertime

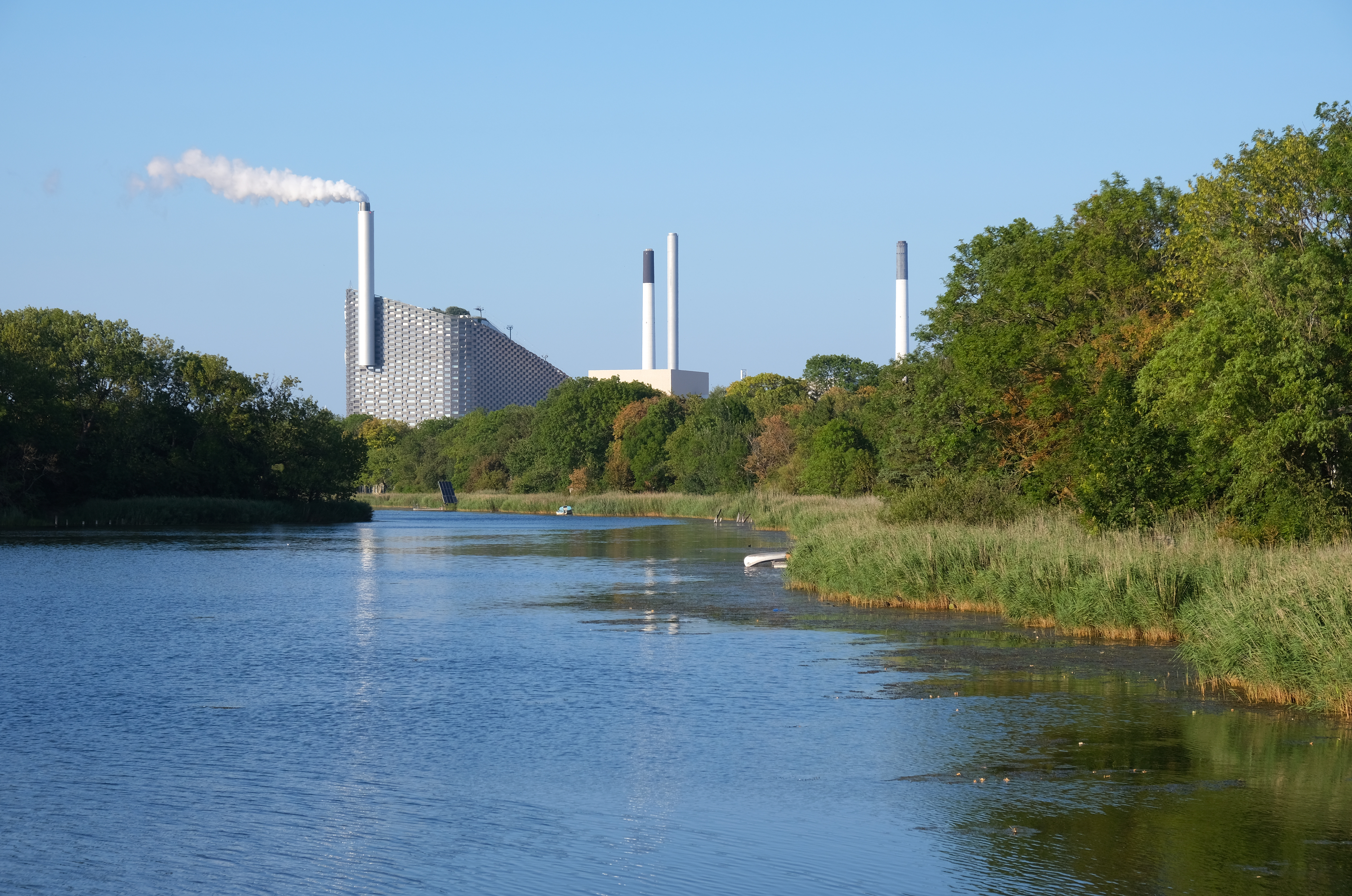
Amager Bakke seen from Dyssebroen

== See also ==
- Parks and open spaces in Copenhagen
