= Dyssebroen =

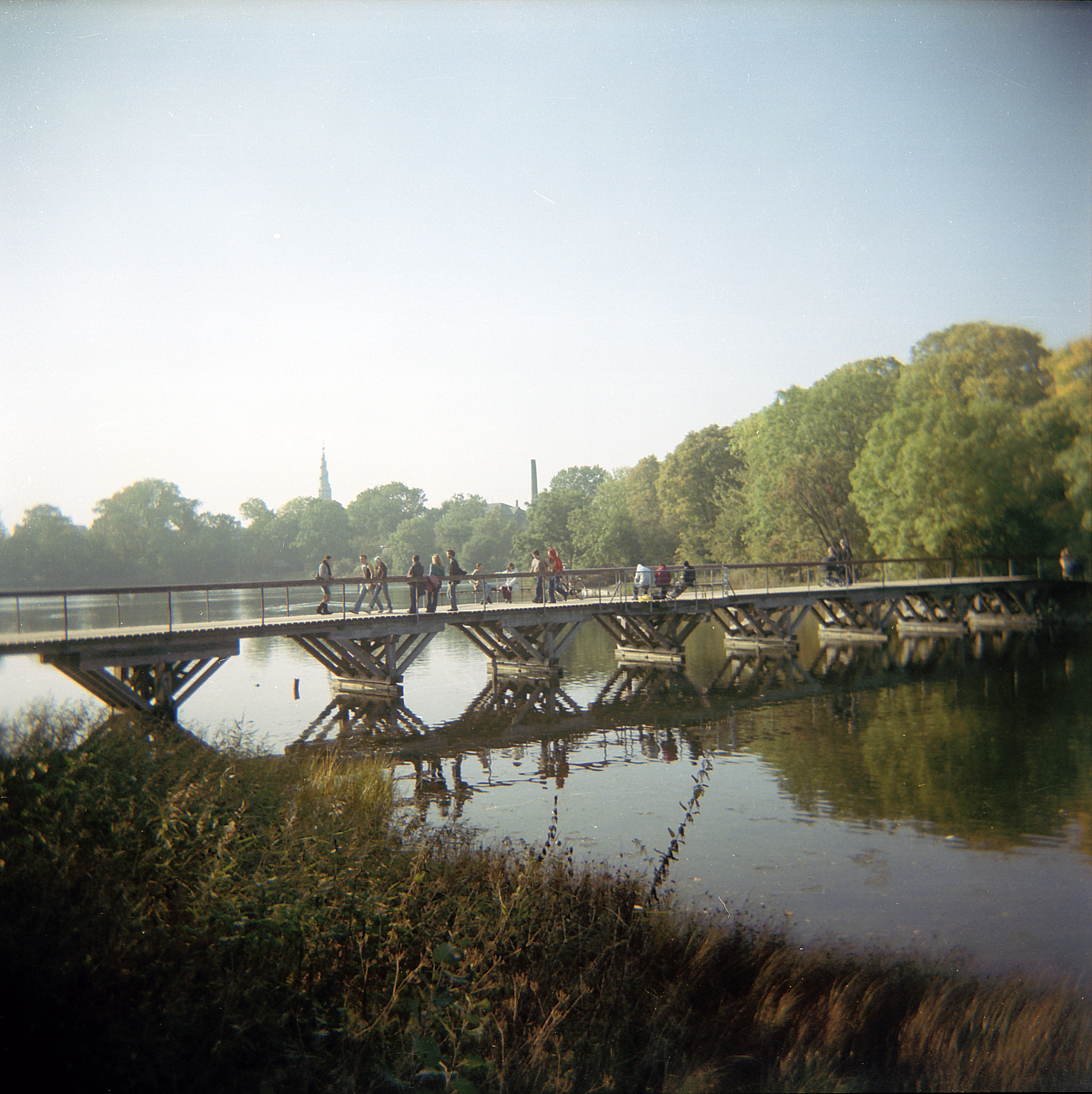
- Coordinates: 55.6734°N 12.6066°E
- Carries: Pedestrian and bicycle traffic
- Crosses: Stadsgraven
- Locale: Copenhagen, Denmark
- Maintained by: Freetown Christiania

Characteristics
- Design: Beam bridge
- Material: Douglas timber
- Total length: App. 60 m
- Width: 2 m

History
- Designer: Architecture without architects
- Construction end: July 1998

Dyssebroen is a pedestrian and cycle bridge located in the area known as Freetown Christiania in Copenhagen, Denmark. It connects the Christianshavn Side main portion of the community to its more 'rural' Amager Side backdrop across Stadsgraven, the former moat of the Christianshavn Rampart which formed part of the Bastioned Fortification Ring which used to guard the city.

== History ==
A timber bridge was constructed at the site in the beginning of the 20th century, built to a particularly robust design because it catered for heavy military traffic. When Freetown Christiania was founded in 1971, the bridge became the main link between the two parts of the community, the larger and more 'urban' Christianshavn side and the smaller and more 'rural' Amager Side. In the 1990s it became clear that the bridge was in strong need of thorough restoration. When it was dismantled it turned out that it was hit even harder with rot than had first been assumed and that a brand new bridge was needed. A team of German wandering journeymen from Ax & Kelle was engaged in the project and construction started in April 1998. Ten builders spent a total of 2,500 hours over a period of three months before the bridge was completed.

== Design ==
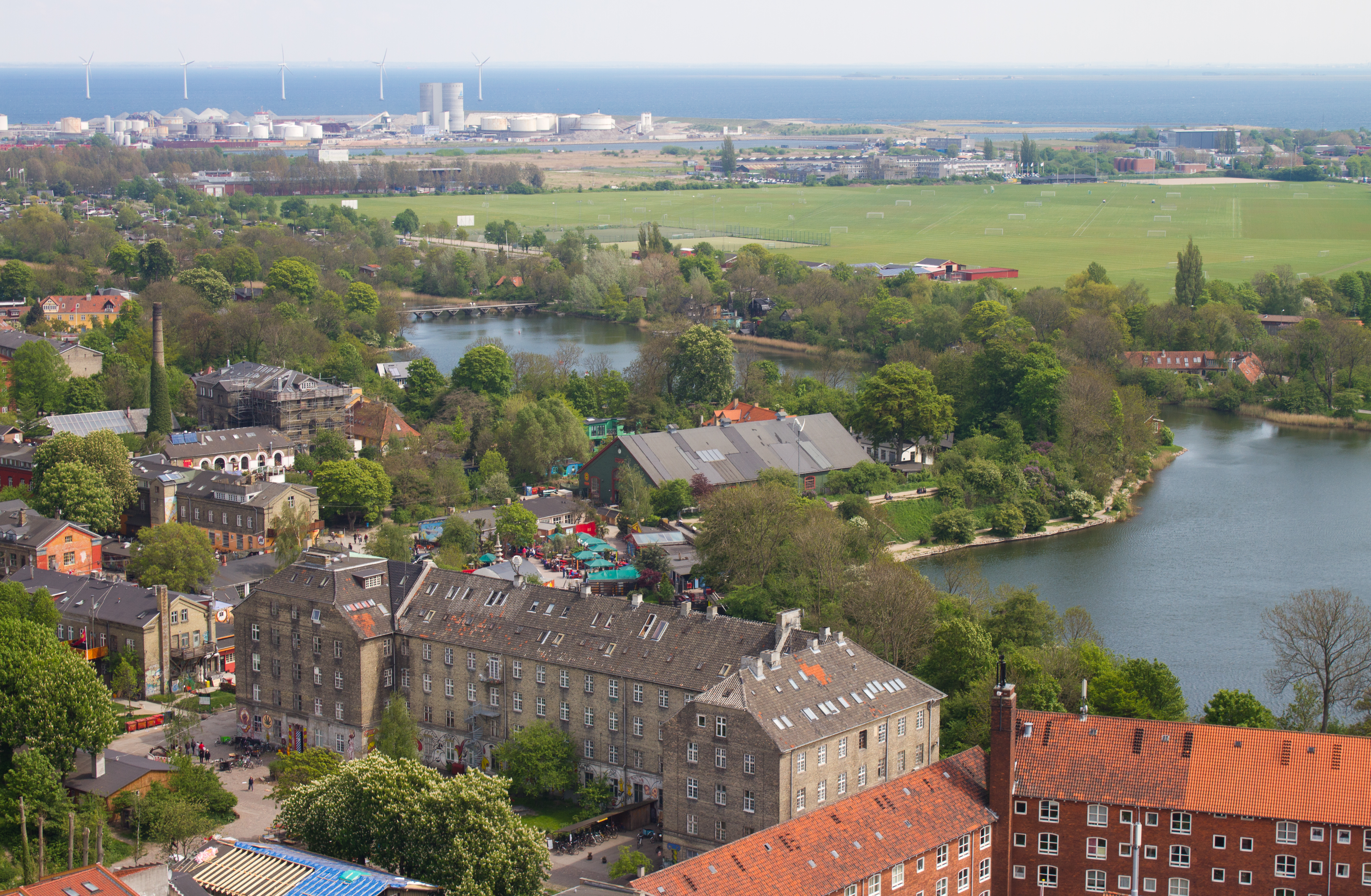
Dyssebroen viewed from the top of Church of Our Saviour

The intact underwater parts of the old bridge was preserved and used as a foundation for the new bridge which is constructed in Douglas timber. The bridge has two semi-circular projections lined by benches along the way.

== See also ==
- Cycling in Copenhagen
- Parks and open spaces in Copenhagen
