= Tom Lundén =

Danish composer and music producer (born 1950)

Tom Lundén (born March 16, 1950) is a Danish composer and music producer. Lunden was the leader and keyboardist of the flower power rock band Bifrost. His two top hits with Bifrost were "Hej Maria" ("Hello, Maria") and "Det er morgen" ("It's Morning"). Lundén also wrote the 1976 protest song "I kan ikke slå os ihjel" (English: "You Cannot Kill Us") as an anthem for the hippie commune of Christiania.

== See also ==
- List of Danish composers
