= Christianshavns Vold =

Rampart that used to surround Copenhagen, Denmark

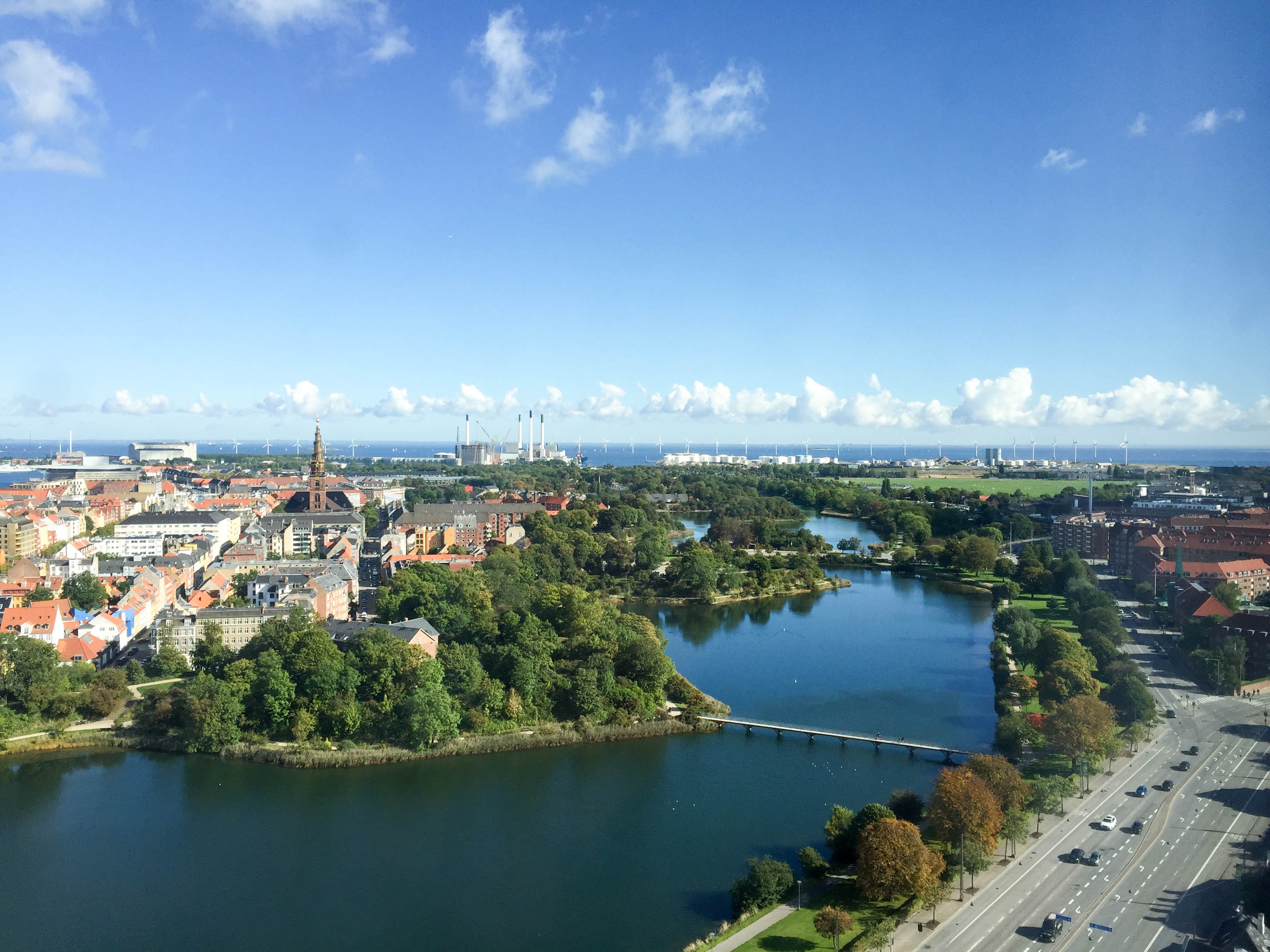
- Christianshavns Vold and Stadsgraven viewed from the top of Radisson Blu Scandinavia Hotel, Oslo

- Location within Denmark
- Interactive map of Christianshavns Vold
- Type: Public park and historic site
- Location: Christianshavn, Copenhagen
- Coordinates: 55.6735°N 12.6035°E
- Area: Land: 12 ha/Water: 19 ha + Christiania portion
- Created: 1918–25

Christianshavns Vold is a former rampart which was part of the bastioned fortification ring which used to surround Copenhagen, Denmark. Running along the full south-eastern perimeter of Christianshavn and Holmen, it used to form a protective barrier towards the island of Amager. It consists of earthworks with 12 bastions and in front of it ran a moat, Stadsgraven, now forming a broad canal which separates Christianshavn from the rest of Amager. On the other side of Stadsgraven. on Amager, was a lower system of outworks called Christianshavns Enveloppe of which only the northern half survives. Along with Kastellet on the other side of the harbour, it is the only intact part of the fortification system.

Today Christianshavns Vold serves as an important greenspace for Christianshavn's inhabitants. The southern half of the rampart is a municipal park whereas the northern portion is part of Freetown Christiania, a self-built, semi-autonomous community which has existed since the early 1970s. Part of Christiania is located on the far side of Stadsgraven and the two halves are connected by the Dyssebroen footbridge.

== History ==
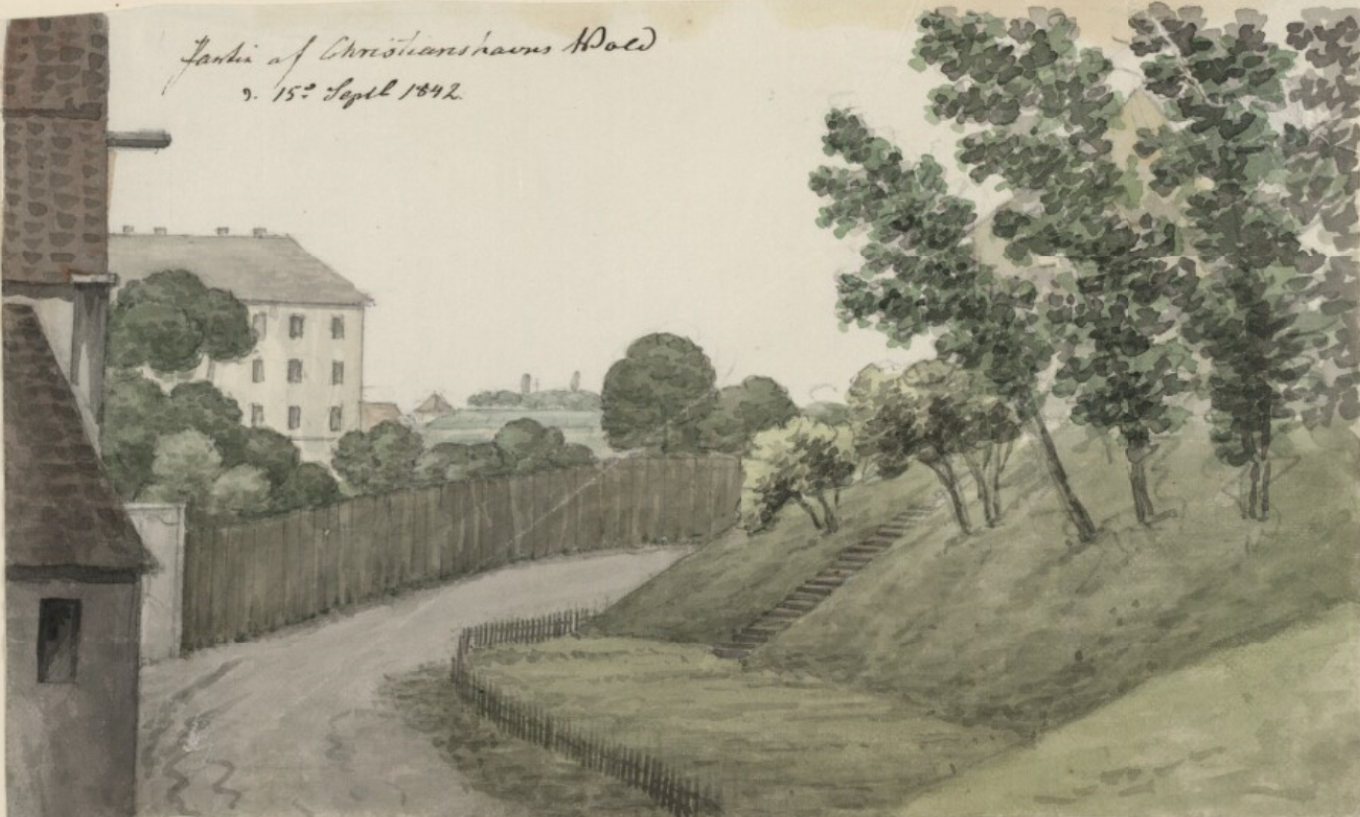
Ole Jørgen Rawert: Christianshavns Vold, 15 March 1842

As part of his endeavour to modernize Copenhagen's fortifications, Christian IV constructed Christianshavn as a fortified merchant's town at a shallow-watered, marshy area north of Amager to complete a fortification ring around Copenhagen. The town was laid out with low earthworks facing Amager. The rampart was constructed with four and a half bastions and a city gate, known as Amagerport, through which all traffic to and from Amager had to pass.

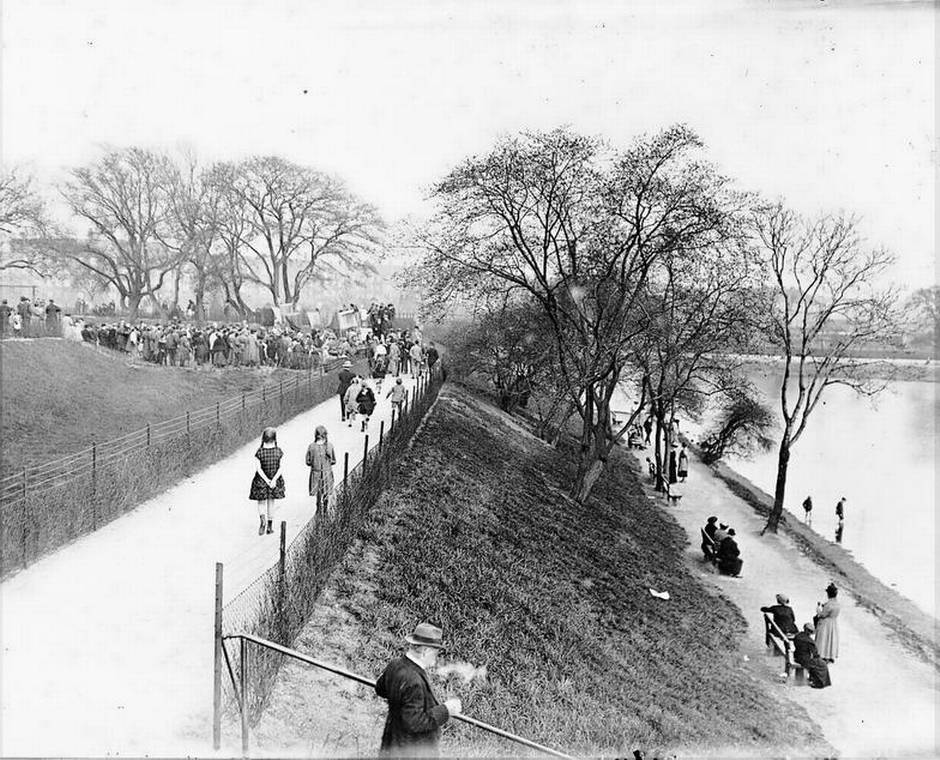
Bülowsvej 22: One of the old villas located on the east side of the street

In the 1670s, when Vestervold was extended to reach the sea, Christiansvold was moved and extended to match the new course of Vestervold. Only the two northernmost bastions, today known as Løvens Bastion and Elefantens Bastion, remained on their original location. The new Christianshavns Vold had five very large bastions. Around the entire complex was a moat with a protecting counterscarp. From 1682 to 1692 Christianshavns Vold was again extended this time in northwards, to guard the entrance to the harbour and protect the new base for the Royal Fleet at what was to become known as Nyholm. The extension included seven new bastions, named for members of the royal family. The last extension of Christianshavns Vold was constructed as late as 1878–82, when a rampart was constructed along the eastside of the newly reclaimed Refshaleø.

== Bastions ==
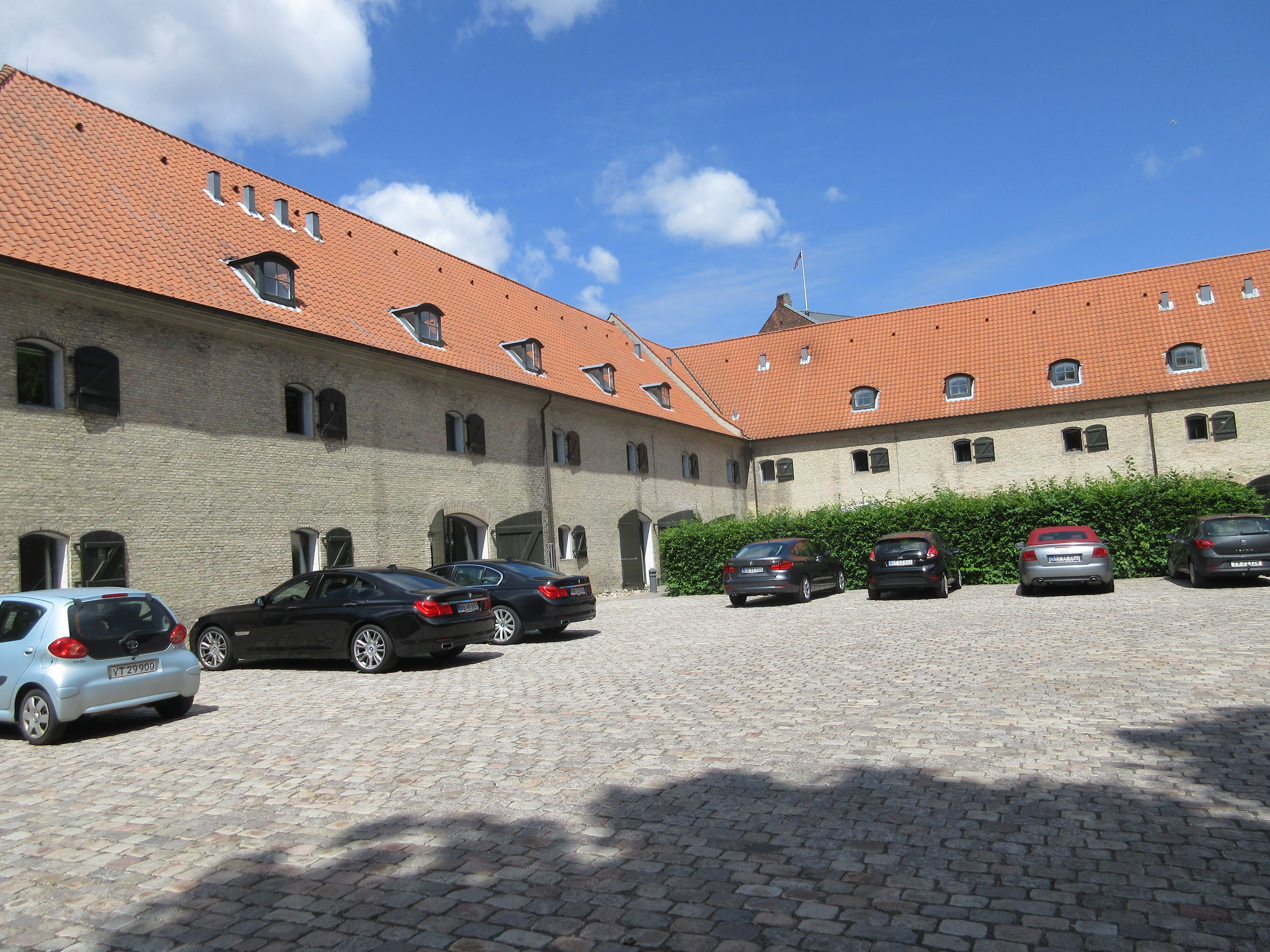
The storage building

=== Kalvebod Bastion ===
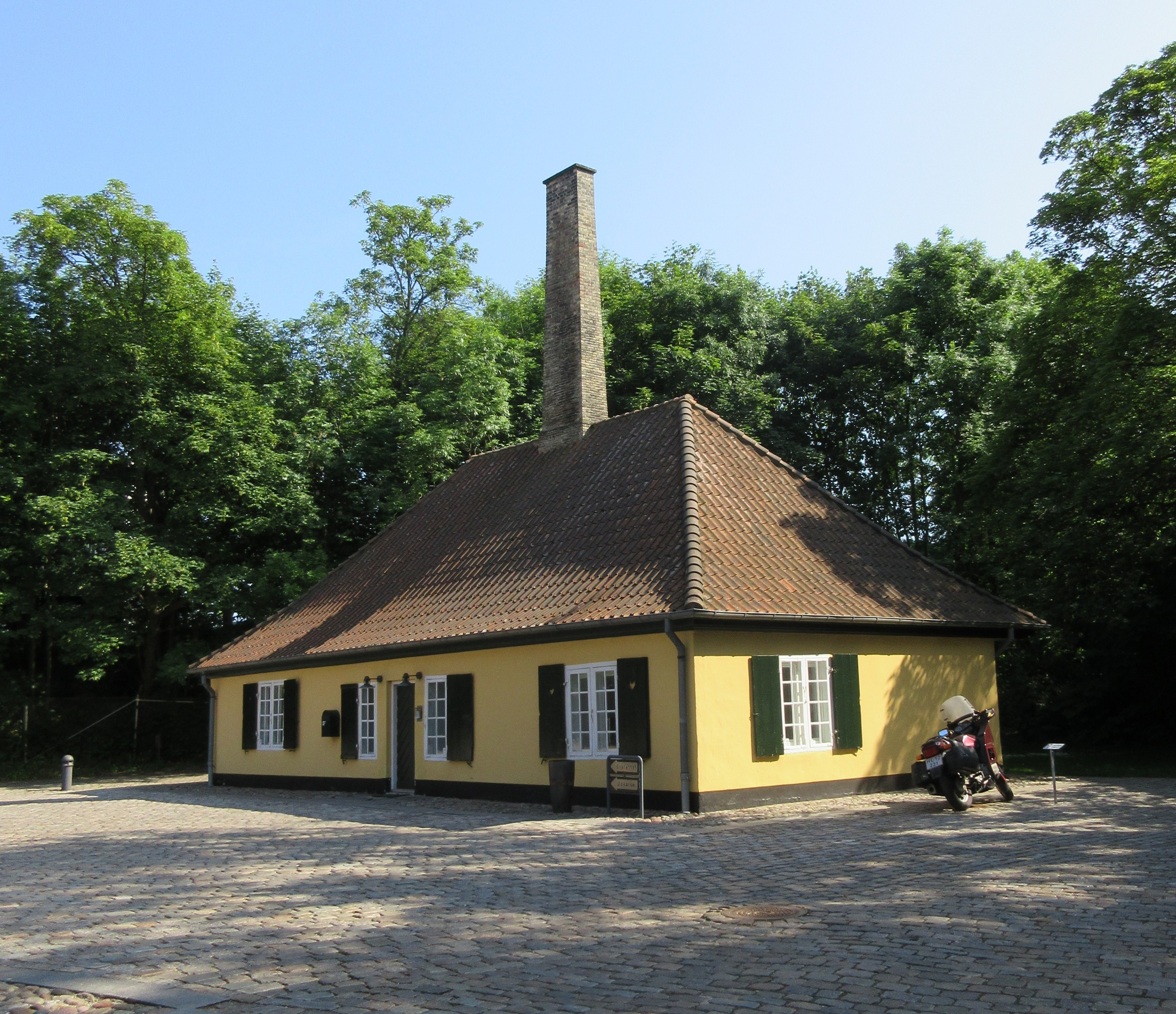
The forge

Kalvebod Bastion takes its name after Kalveboderne, the shallow waters which were located to the south of Copenhagen in what is now its Southern Docklands. The bastion contains two buildings. Magasinbygningen, the larger of the two, is a two-storey, L-shaped storage building from 1800. The other one is a small forge from 1757. Both are today owned by Karberghus, a privately owned property which mainly invests in historic properties.

=== Enhjørningens Bastion ===
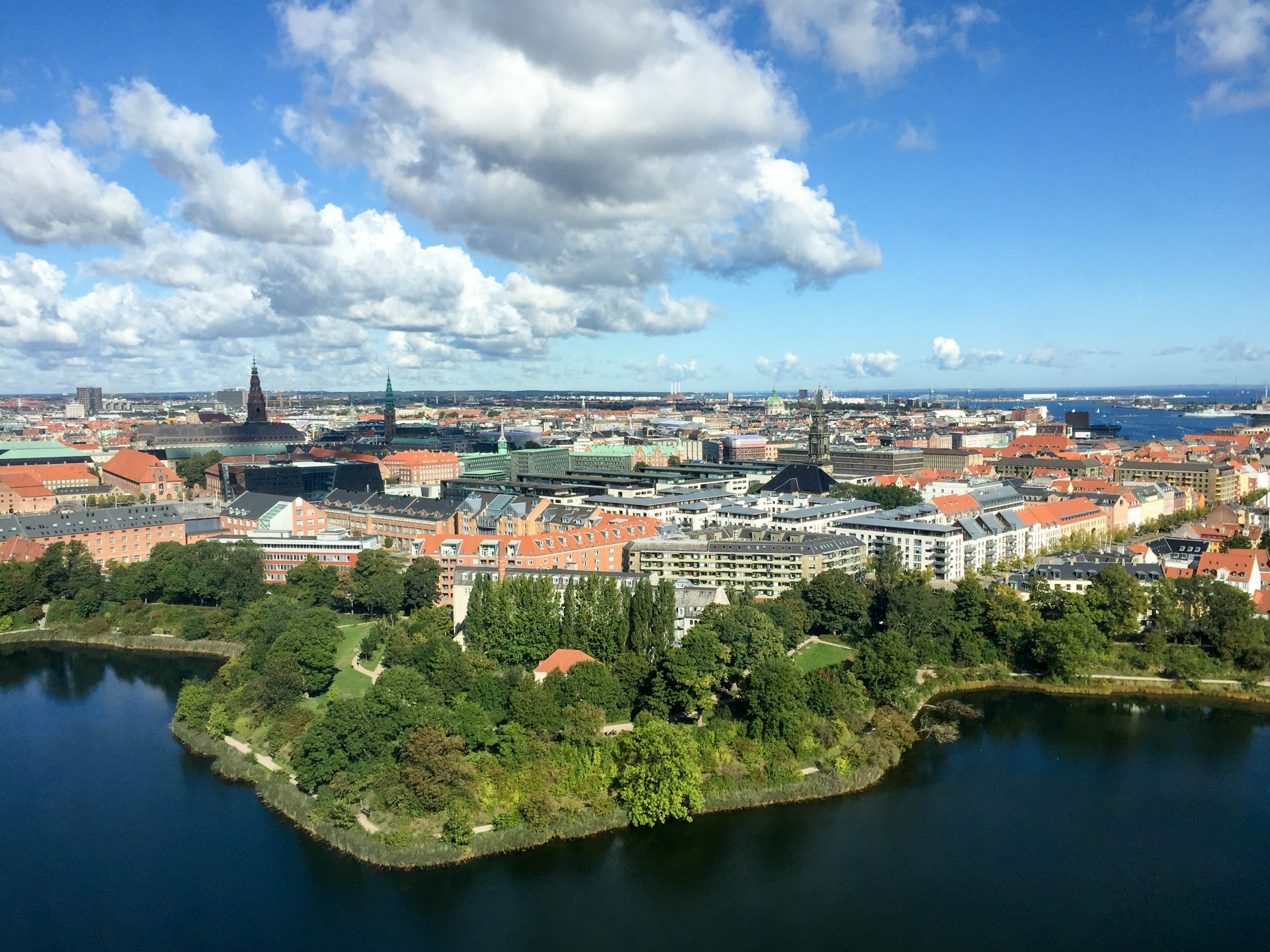
Enhjørningens Bastion

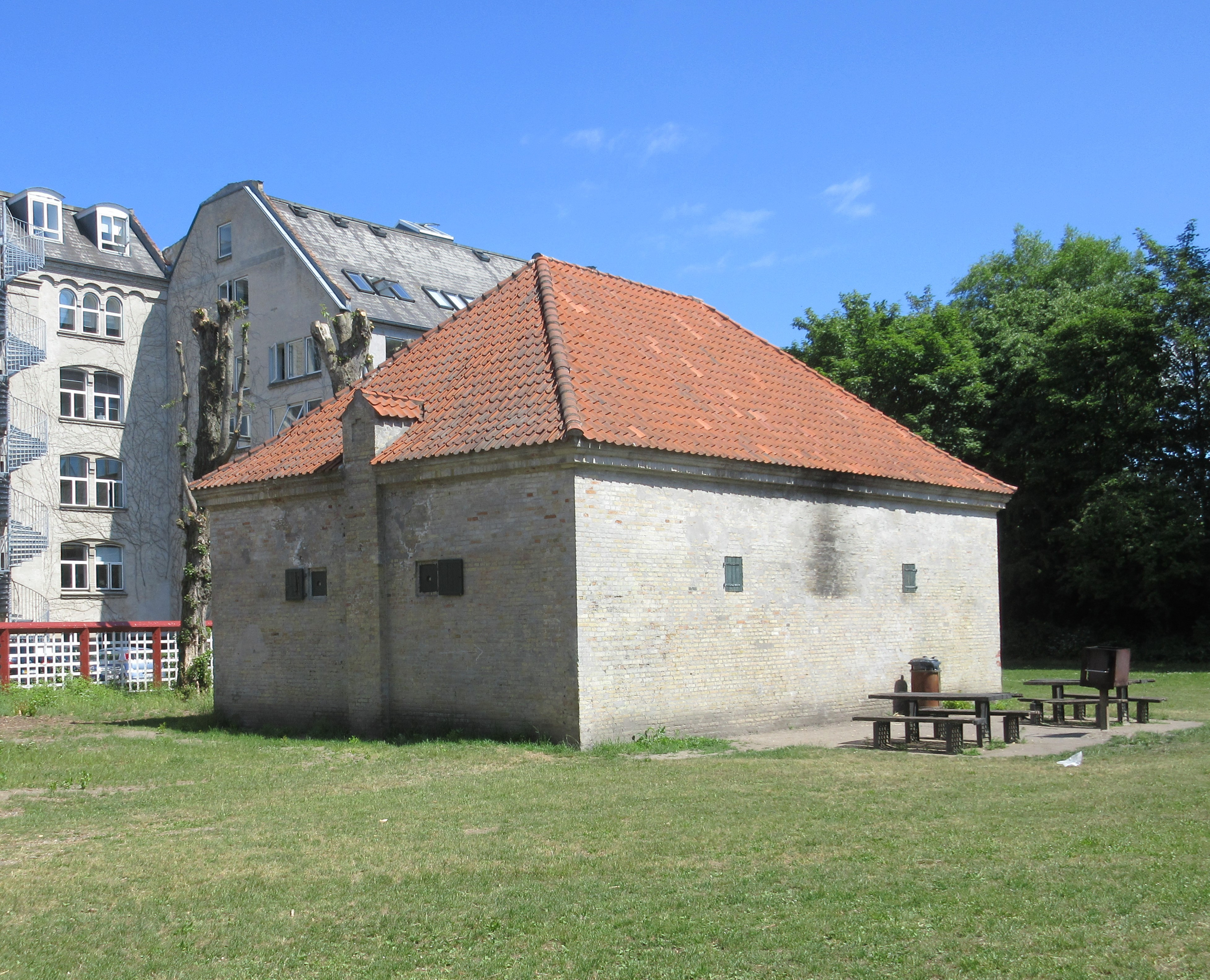
The former gunpowder magazine inside Enhjørningens Bastion

Enhjørningens Bastion (The Unicorn's Bastion) dates from 1668 to 1670. The bastion contains a gunpowder magazine from c. 1675 which was formerly used as a storage space by Copenhagen Municipality's park authority. It now serves as club house for Qajaq København, a kayak club.

A windmill was first constructed on the bastion in 1683. It was destroyed by fire in the 1750s but replaced by a new one in the 1770s. A combined distillery and tavern—frequentved by the many Dyrch farmers from Amager who came to Copenhagen on market days to sell their produce on Amagertorv—was also located on the site. In the late 18th century, Peter Rabe Holm constructed a small beer brewery on the site. In the 1850s, it was replaced by a new, industrial brewery still known as Rabeshave ("Rabe's Garden") after the site's former owner. In the 1890s, Tabeshave merged with 11 other breweries as De Forenede Bryggerier. In 1907–1919, J. Wiedemann constructed a sausage factory on the site. It has now been converted into a multi-tenant office complex (Æangebrogade 6). The adjacent double house from 1802 to 1914 was listed in the Danish registry of protected buildings and places in 1988.

=== Panterens Bastio ===
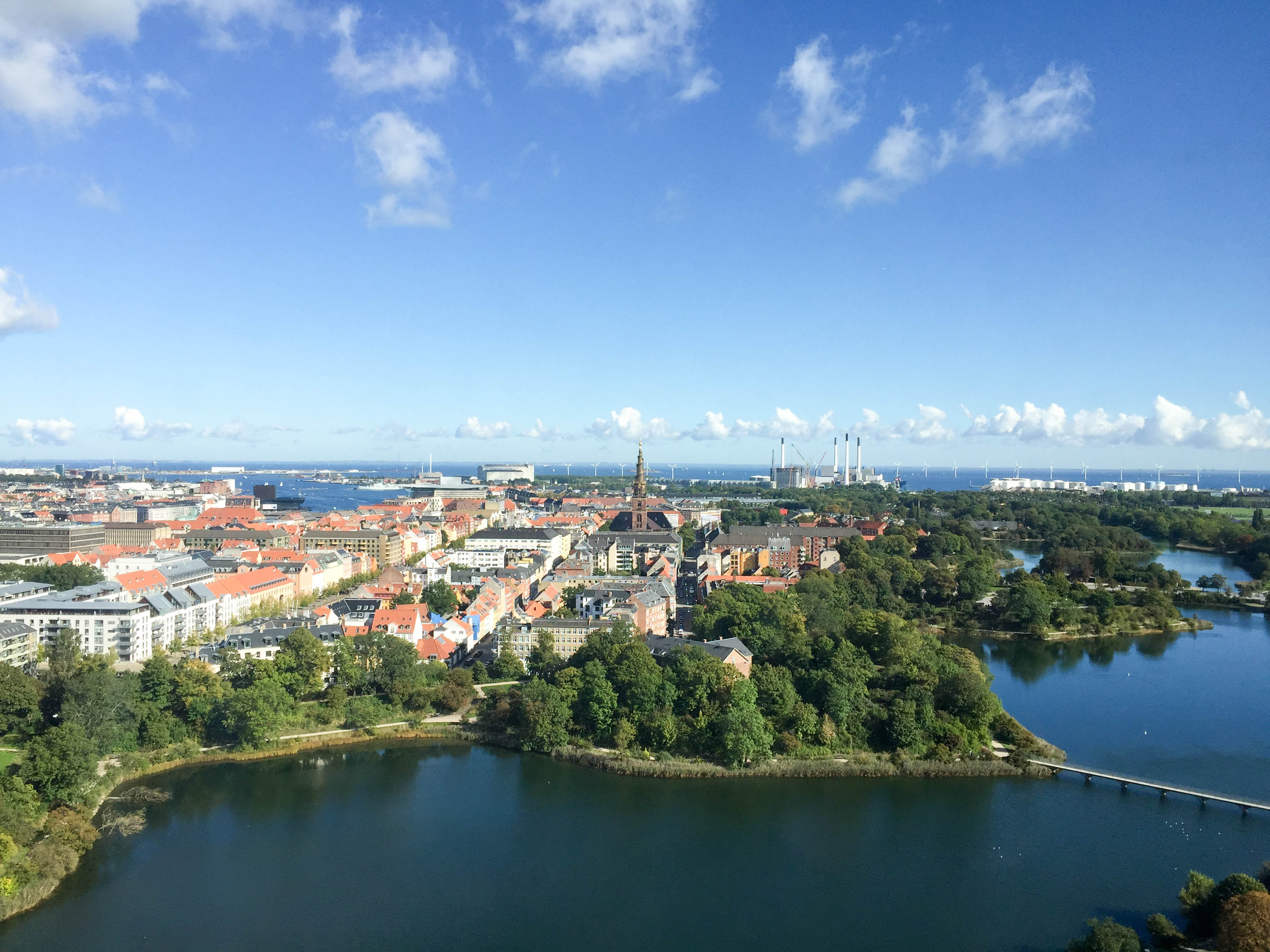
Enhjørningens Bastion

Panterens Bastion (The Panther's Bastion) contains a former military training facility for shooting with hand guns. The buildings, a complex of red brick buildings, has now been converted into apartments. An unnamed footbridge connects the bastion to Amager Boulevard on the other side of Stadsgraven.

=== Elefantens Bastion ===
Elefantens Bastion (The Elephant's Bastion) is located just south of Torvegade. It replaced Møllebastionen (The Mill Bastion) in 1667–70. A windmill, Breslaus Mølle, stood on the bastion from 1670 to 1842.

=== Løvens Bastion ===
Løvens Bastion (The Lion's Bastion) is located a little north of Torvegade. The bastion is home to Lille Mølle, a smock mill which replaced an older stub mill in 1783. The mill cap was removed in 1897 and it was later converted into a private residence. It was taken over by National Museum in the early 1970s and is now operated as a historic house museum. An adjacent building contains the restaurant Løven + Bastionen.

=== Ulrichs Bastion ===
Ulriks Bastion (Ulrik's Bastion) dates from 1682 to 1692. It was named after Ulrik Christian Gyldenløve, a son of Christian V and Sophie Amalie Moth. It was used by Søetatens Laboratorium and became part of Bådsmandsgade Barracks in the 1830s. It has been part of Christiania since 1971.

=== Sophie Hedvigs Bastion ===
Sophie Hedvigs Bastion dates from 1682 to 1692. It received its name after Princess Sophia Hedwig, a daughter of Christian V by QueenCharlotte Amalie. It contained a gunpowder mill from 1687 to 1750 and then an oil mill until it became part of Bådmandsgade Barracks in the 1830s. It is now part of Christiania. The footbridge Dyssebroen connects the bastion to Dyssen on the other side of Stadsgraven.

=== Vilhelms Bastion ===
Vilhelms Bastion dates from 1682. It received its name after Prince William of Denmark, a son of Christian V by Queen Charlotte Amalie. The bastion contains a gunpowder magazine from 1688. It was designed by Hans van Steenwinckel the Youngest. A half-timbered building was constructed next to it in 1690.

=== Carls Bastion ===
Carls Bastion (Charles' Bastion) dates from the years after 1682. It was named after Prince Charles, a son of Christian V by Queen Charlotte Amalie. The bastion contains a gunpowder magazine from 1690. It was designed by Hans van Steenwinckel the Youngest.

=== Frederiks Bastion ===
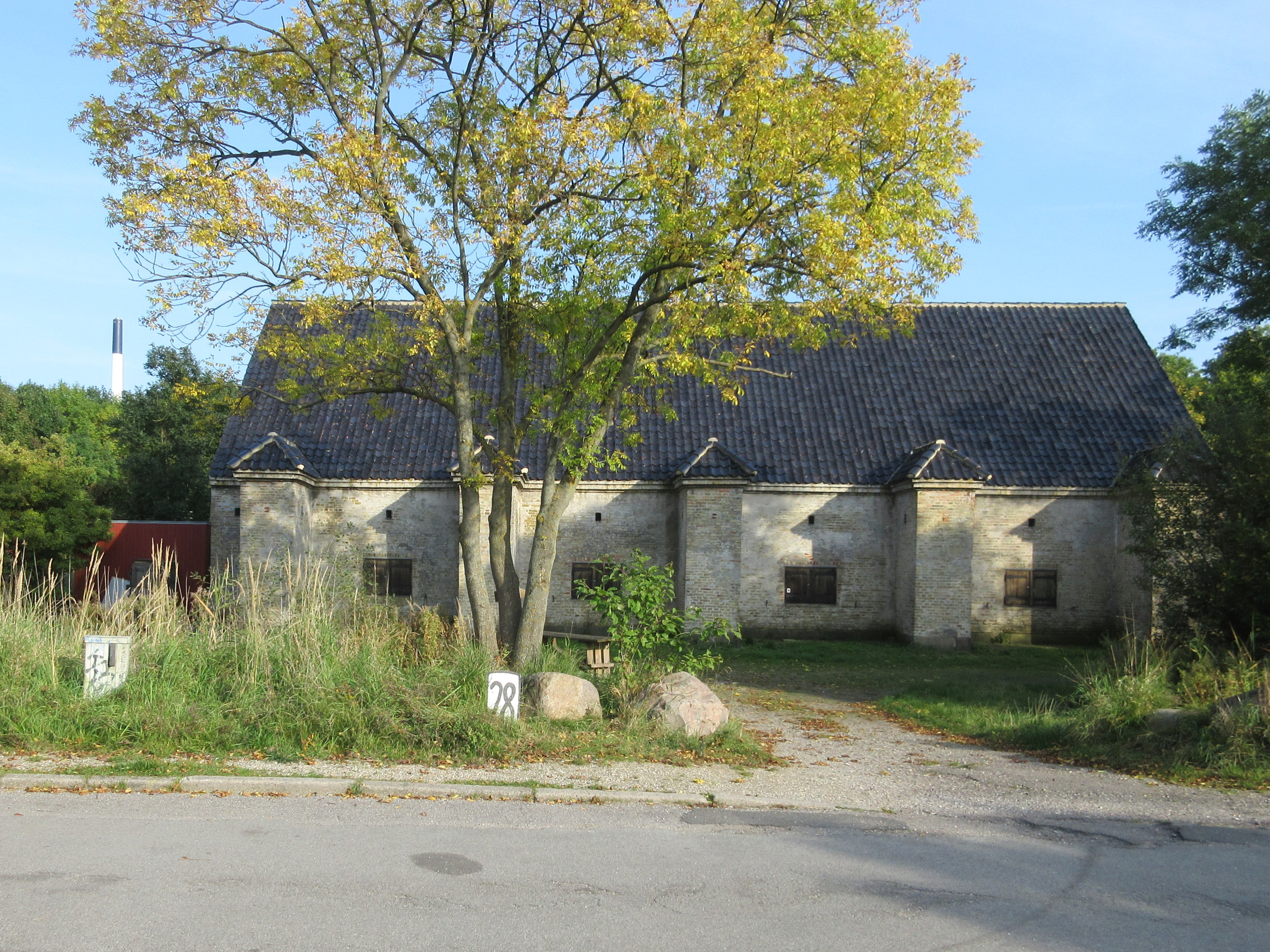
The powder magazine at Frederiks Bastion

Frederiks Bastion (Frederik's Bastion) dates from the years after 1682. It was named after Crown Prince Frederick, Christian V's son by Queen Charlotte Amalie, who succeed him in 1744–45. The bastion contains a gunpowder magazine from 1690. It was designed by C.E.D. von Øtken. The building, which is known simply as Frederiks Bastion, is used as a venue for exhibitions, concerts, workshops, meetings and other events.

=== Charlotte Amalies Bastion ===
Charlotte Amalies Bastion is located just north of Refshalevej. It dates from the years after 1682 and is named after Charlotte Amalie, Christian V's queen. Restaurant 56° is located in a former gunpowder magazine. The gunpowder magazine is from 1744 to 1745. It was designed by C.E.D. von Øtken.

=== Quintus Bastion ===
Quintus Bastion or Christiani Quinti Bastion dates from the years after 1682. It was named after Christian V. It became part of the Nyholm Dockyards in the 1770s. In 1858, it became home to the storage facility Søbefæstningens Materialgård. Galf of the bastion was made available to Søminekorpset in the 1870s, and several buildings were subsequently built at the site.

== Christianshavns Vold today ==
Christianshavns Vold generally remains well-preserved as a historic site. Torvegade, the main thoroughfare of Christianshavn, running from Knippels Bridge to the dam to Amager, passes between Løvens Bastion and Elefantens Bastion at the site where Amagerport used to lie. The grounds serve as a public park, part of the city's Fortification Ring park band. The windmill on Løvens Bastion, Lille Mølle which was converted into a private home in 1917, has been converted into a historic house museum.

The northern part of the rampart is today part of Freetown Christiania. The two former gunpowder magazines at Frederiks and Carls Bastions serve as venues for small concerts and art exhibitions.

== Public art and memorials ==
On the Lion's Bastion stands a memorial to the writer Martin Andersen Nexø who was born in nearby Sankt Annæ Gade. The work, a bronze torso on a granite plinth, was created by Knud Nellemose. On the Panther's Bastion stands another memorial. It depicts Christians Holm, one of the driving forces behind the preservation of Christianshavns Vold.

== See also ==
- Fortifications of Copenhagen (17th century)
- Fortification Ring, Copenhagen
- Parks and open spaces in Copenhagen
