= Bifrost (band) =

Danish rock band

- Origin: Copenhagen, Denmark
- Genres: Folk rock
- Years active: 1974–present
- Labels: CBS Records; Mercury Records
- Past members: Tom Lundén; Ida Klemann; Finn Jensen; Torben Andersen; Asger Skjold-Rasmussen; Mogens Ficher; Annapurna
- Website: http://www.bifrost.name/

Bifrost is a rock band from Denmark. The early band was considered one of the last of the Danish flower power revolution bands and is best known for the songs "Hej Maria" (translated: "Hello Maria") and "Det er morgen" (translated: "It's Morning"), both written and sung by keyboardist Tom Lundén. While leading Bifrost, Lundén also wrote the 1976 protest song "I kan ikke slå os ihjel" (translated: "You Cannot Kill Us") as an anthem for the revolutionary hippie commune of Christiania. Founded in 1974. The early band consisted of Tom Lundén, Ida Klemann, Finn Jensen, Torben Andersen, Asger Skjold-Rasmussen, Mogens Ficher and dancer and singer Annapurna. In 1977, Mikael Miller replaced Finn Jensen on guitar. In 1978, John Teglgaard joined the group as an additional guitarist. From 1976 to 1996, Bifrost released nine albums on the CBS and Mercury Records labels.

== Discography ==
- Bifrost, 1976 (CBS Records) - rereleased on CD by Sony BMG Music Entertainment
- Til En Sigøjner, 1977 (CBS Records) - rereleased on CD by Sony BMG Music Entertainment
- Læn Dem Ikke Ud, 1979 (CBS Records)
- Crazy Canary, 1980 (Mercury Records)
- Kassen & Hjertet, 1981 (Mercury Records)
- En Tro Kopi, 1982 (Mercury Records)
- Bifrost, 1984 (Mercury Records)
- Vand Jeg Kan Gå På, 1987 (It's Magic)
- Hjerte Til Salg, 1996 (Columbia)
