= Hans van Steenwinckel the Youngest =

Danish architect and sculptor

Hans van Steenwinckel the Youngest (1639–1700) was a Danish architect and sculptor, son of Hans van Steenwinckel the Younger and grandson of Hans van Steenwinckel the Elder. Following in the footsteps of his father and grandfather, he became a Royal Building Master in 1669. Around 1680 he also became Naval Building Master at Holmen, replacing Ewert Janssen.

== Principal works ==
=== Prince George's Palace ===
From 1671 to 1673, van Steenwinckel destroyed Prince George's Palace in Vordingborg. It was an elegant Baroque palace, built for Prince George of Denmark on the ruins of Vordingborg Castle, which had been destroyed by the Swedish in the Northern Wars a decade earlier. In 1683 Prince George was married to Princess Anne of Great Britain, probably without ever having taken up residence in Vordingborg. In 1750 the empty building was demolished.

=== Sepulchral chapel ===
At St. Peter's Church in Copenhagen, on which his grandfather had done considerable work a hundred years earlier, van Steenwinckel the Youngest built a three-winged sepulchral chapel from 1681 to 1683. He also carried out work on the church proper, including the addition of a Baroque gable to the choir.

=== Gunpowder magazines ===
After his appointment as Naval Building Master at Holmen, he was responsible for the construction of two gunpowder magazines at the Christianshavn Rampart. Construction of the first magazine, located at Vilhelms Bastion, was commenced in 1688, while the second one, built to a similar design at Carls Bastion, was begun two years later.

=== First Eremitage ===
In 1694, he also designed the Hubertus House, the precursor of the Eremitage Palace in Jægersborg Dyrehave. Named for Hubertus, the patron saint of hunters, it was a belvedere used by Christian V for Banquets and royal hunts. The structure was most likely far too weak, and in spite of extensive repairs in 1731, the chalet was in such a poor condition in 1734 that it was deemed necessary to tear it down.

=== Other work ===
Hans van Steenwinckel the Youngest also served under General Building Master Lambert van Haven, participating in the execution of projects such as the new Nørreport city gate and Church of Our Saviour. As Naval Building Master he built the naval hospice Kvæsthuset at the corner of Kvæsthusgade and Sankt Annæ Plads (1684–86), but the following year it was converted to recruit barracks for the Copenhagen Garrison.
