= Torvegade =

Street in Copenhagen, Denmark

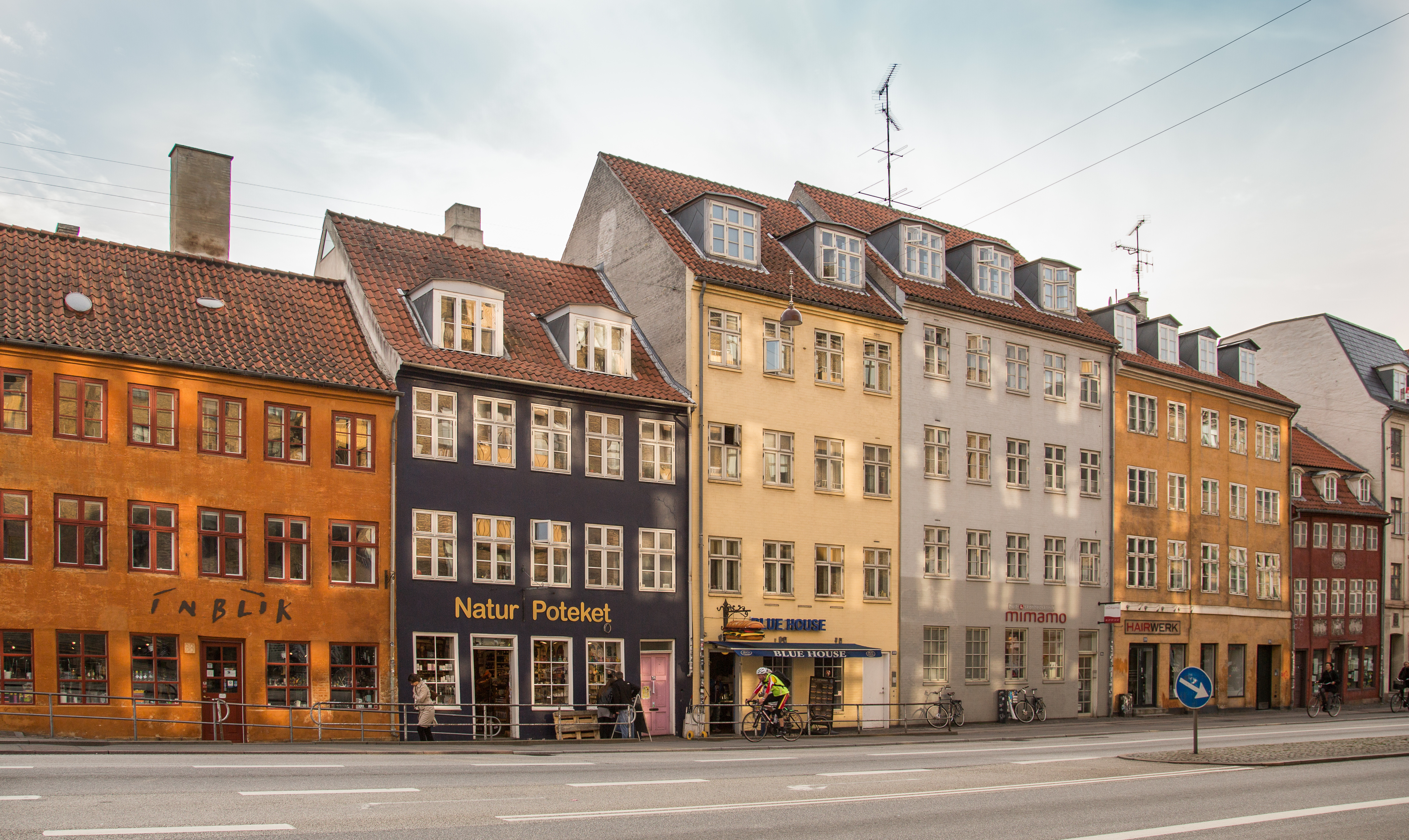
- Torvegade
- Length: 460 m (1,510 ft)
- Location: Christianshavn, Copenhagen, Denmark
- Postal code: 1416
- Coordinates: 55°40′20.28″N 12°35′29.4″E

Torvegade (lit. 'Market Street') is the central thoroughfare of Christianshavn in Copenhagen, Denmark, linking the city centre by way of Knippel Bridge with Amagerside Copenhagen at Christmas Møllers Plads. The street crosses Christianshavn Canal at Christianshavns Torv, the central square of the neighbourhood. The last section of the street runs on the embankment that across Stadsgraven.

== History ==
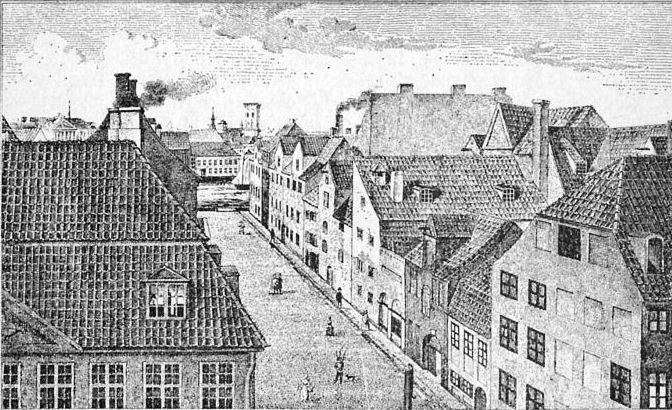
Torvegade in the middle of the 19th century

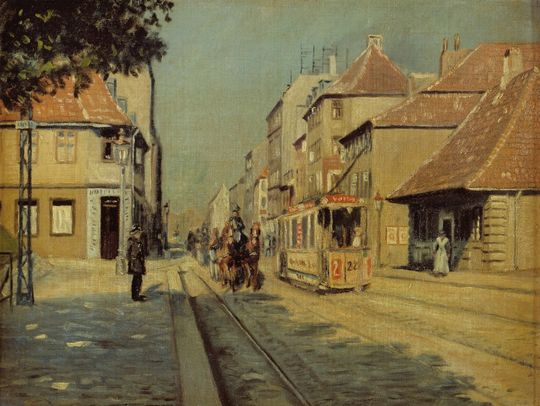
Torvegade early in the 1900s before it was expanded

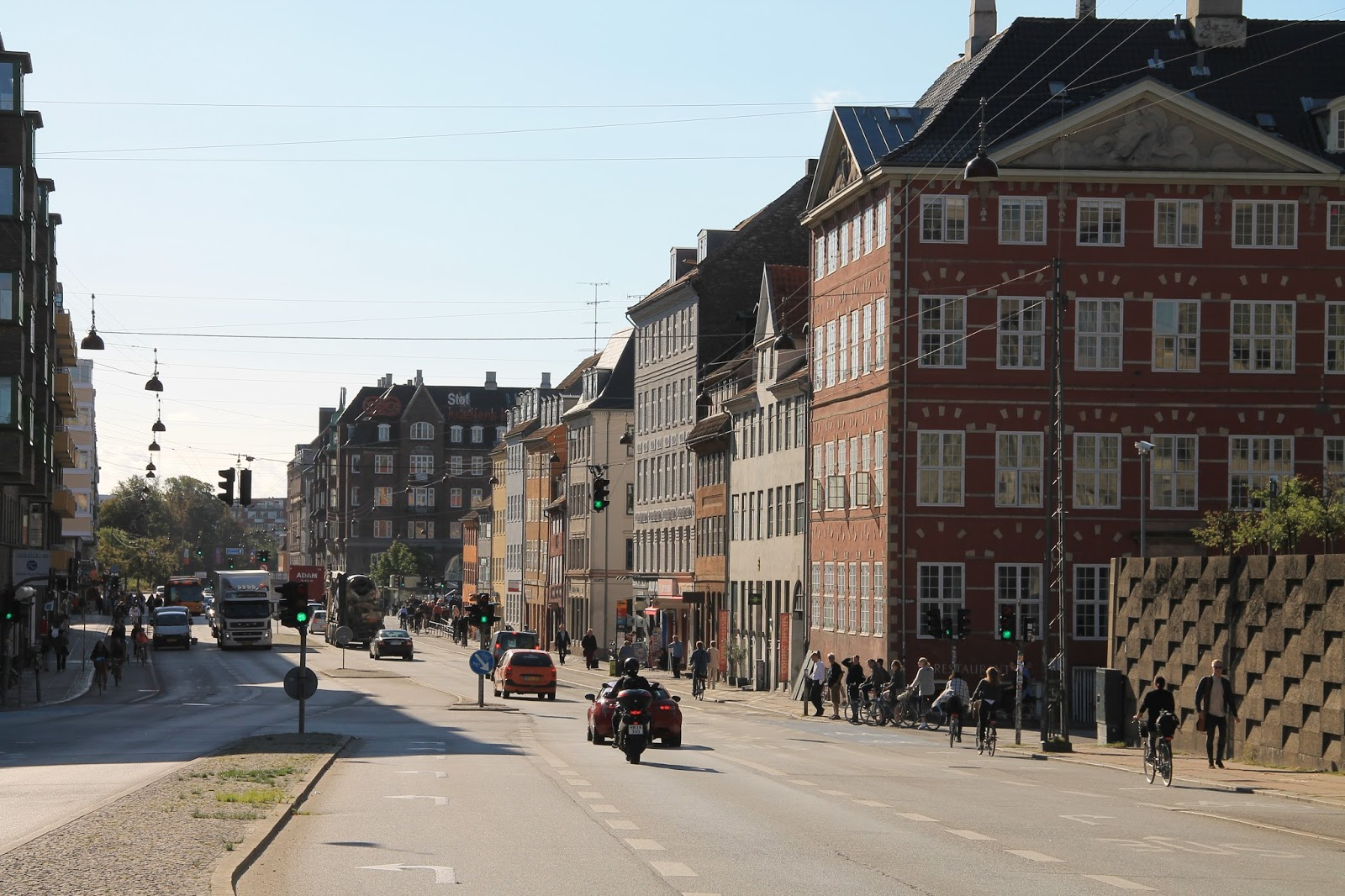
Torvegade viewed from Strandgadeexpanded

Torvegade was the central main street of Johan Sems's original town plan. Amager Gate was built in 1624 at the eastern end of the street, although the bridge which connected it to Amager across the Stadsgraven moat was not completed until 1628. The Amager farmers passed through the street on the way to town with their produce. Amager Gate was demolished when it was decided to decommission Copenhagen's fortifications in the 1850s.

In the 1920s, the City decided to build a new Knippelsbro Bridge to widen Torvegade. Until then, the portion between Knippelsbro and the canal had been known as Lille Torvegade ("Little Market Street") while the portion between the canal and Christianshavn Rampart was known as Store Torvegade ("Great Market Street"). The houses along its north side (uneven numbers) were all expropriated and demolished. The expanded Torvegade was ready in 1926.

== Buildings ==
The Acciseboden (The ‘’Octroi House’’) at Christianshavn Rampart was originally a residence for the guard at Amager Gate. It was located just inside the gate but moved 12 metres in connection with the expansion of Torvegade in 1926. It was from 1857 to 1916 used by the soldiers who patrolled Christianshavn Rampart. The Acciseboden is thus misleading since it was never directly involved in the collection of octroi. No. 22, 24, 27 and 30 all date from the 18th century and are listed. The Rhode House, on the corner of Strandgade, is from 1640.

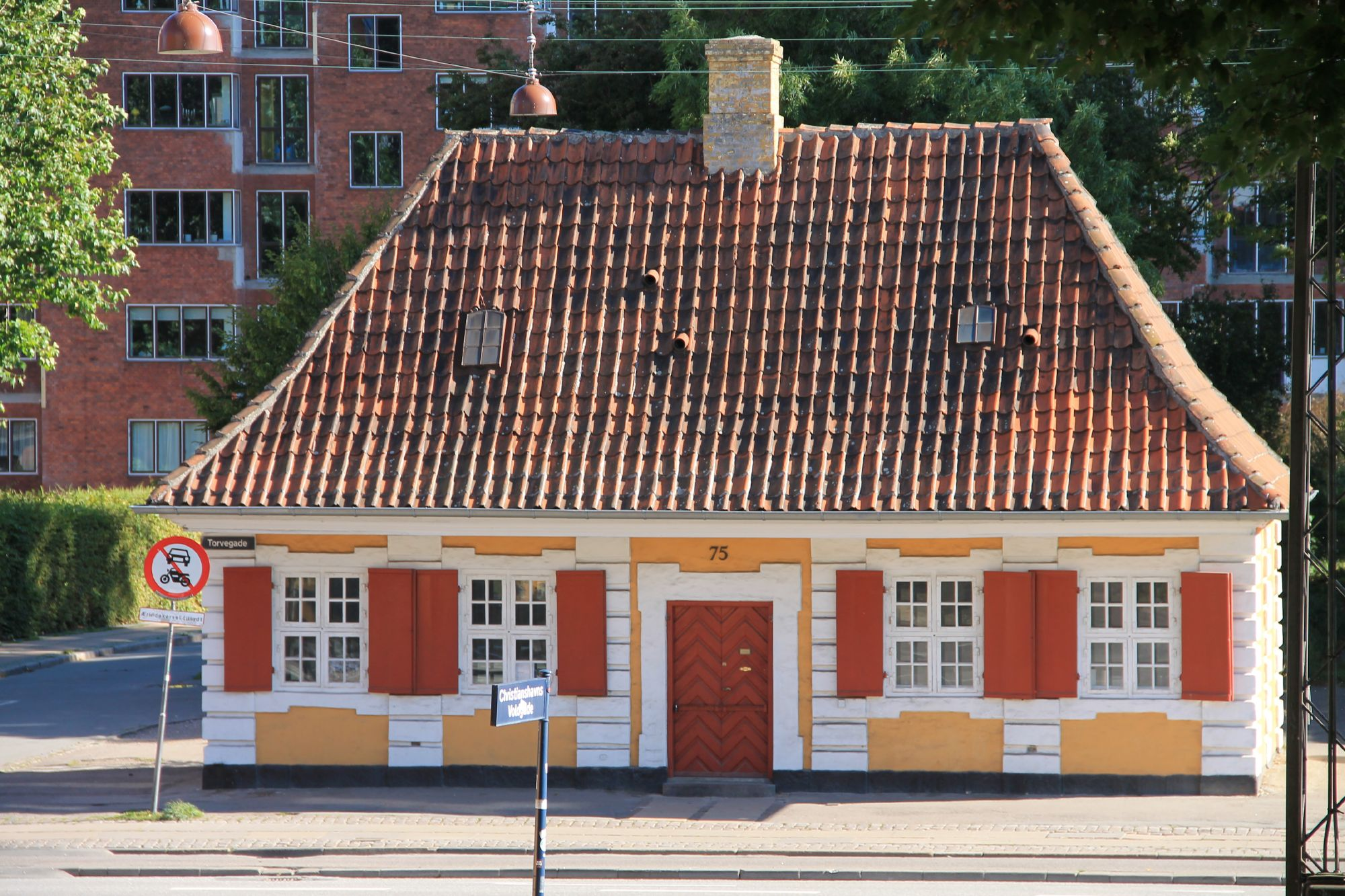
Acciseboden

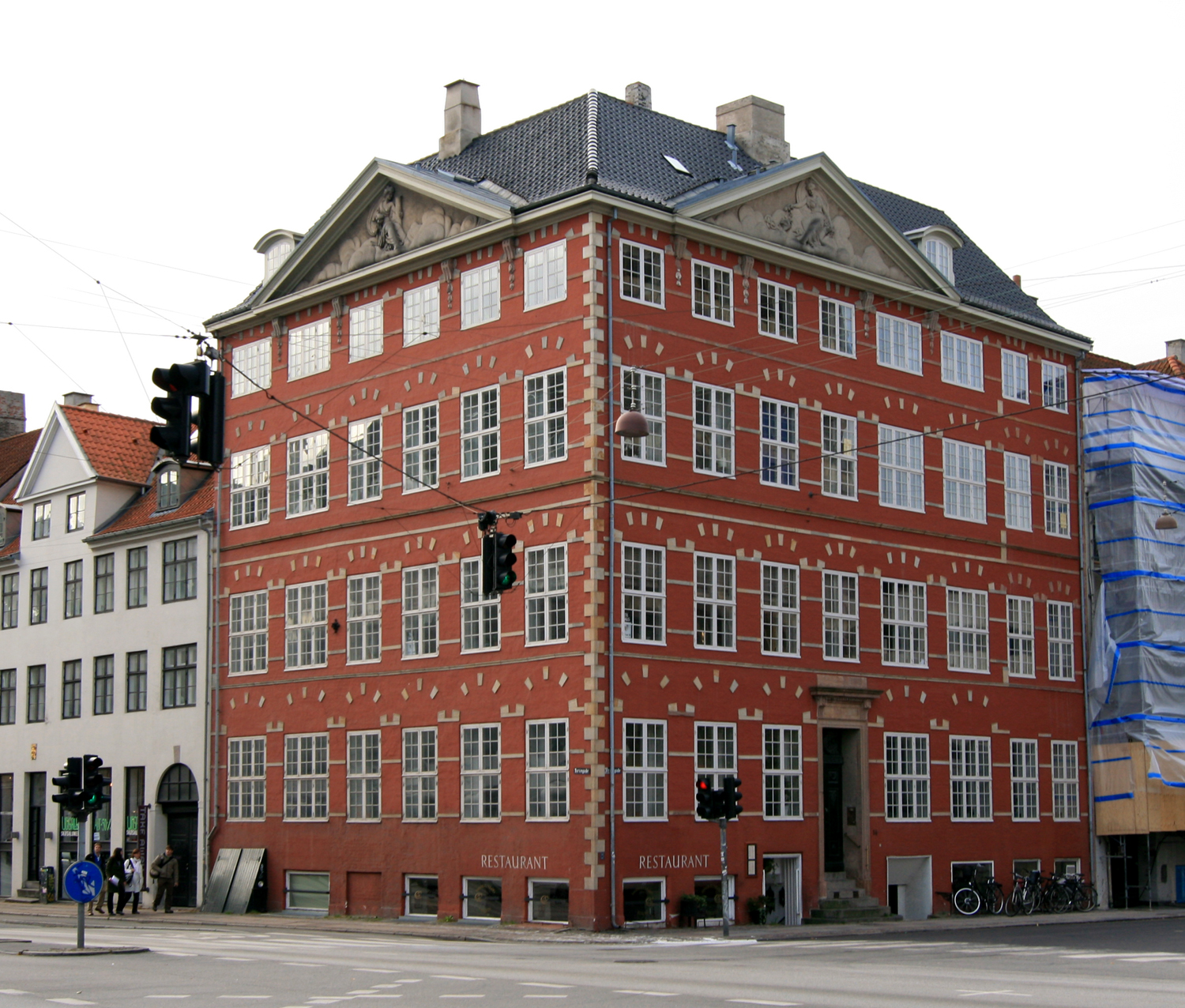
The Rhode House on the corner of Strandgade

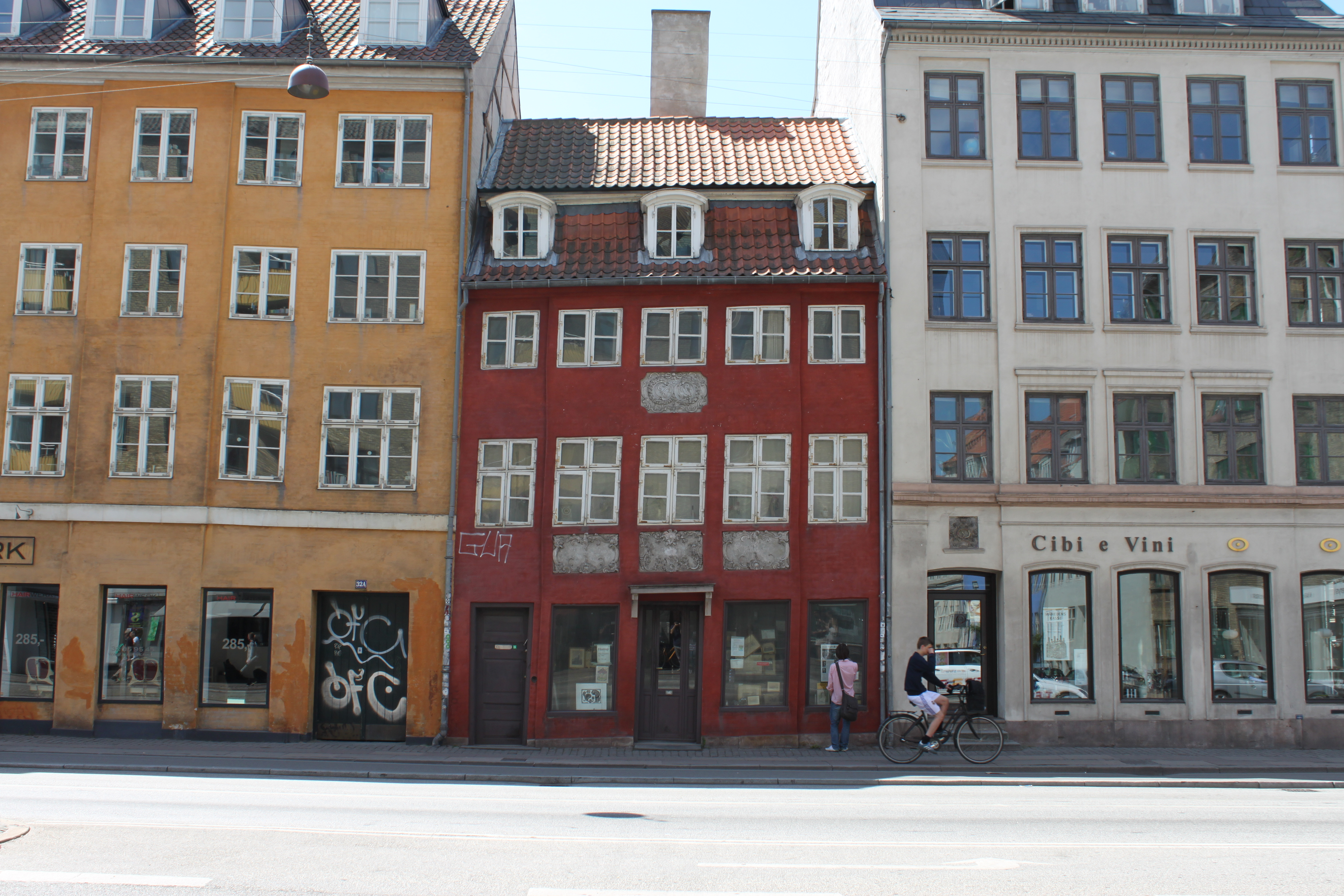
30 Torvegade

== Cultural references ==
- The Olsen-banden gang drives through Torvegade at 0:58:54 in The Last Exploits of the Olsen Gang (1974).

== See also ==
- Sankt Annæ Gade
