= Christianshavn =

Neighbourhood of Copenhagen, Denmark

Coordinates: 55°40′25″N 12°35′35″E

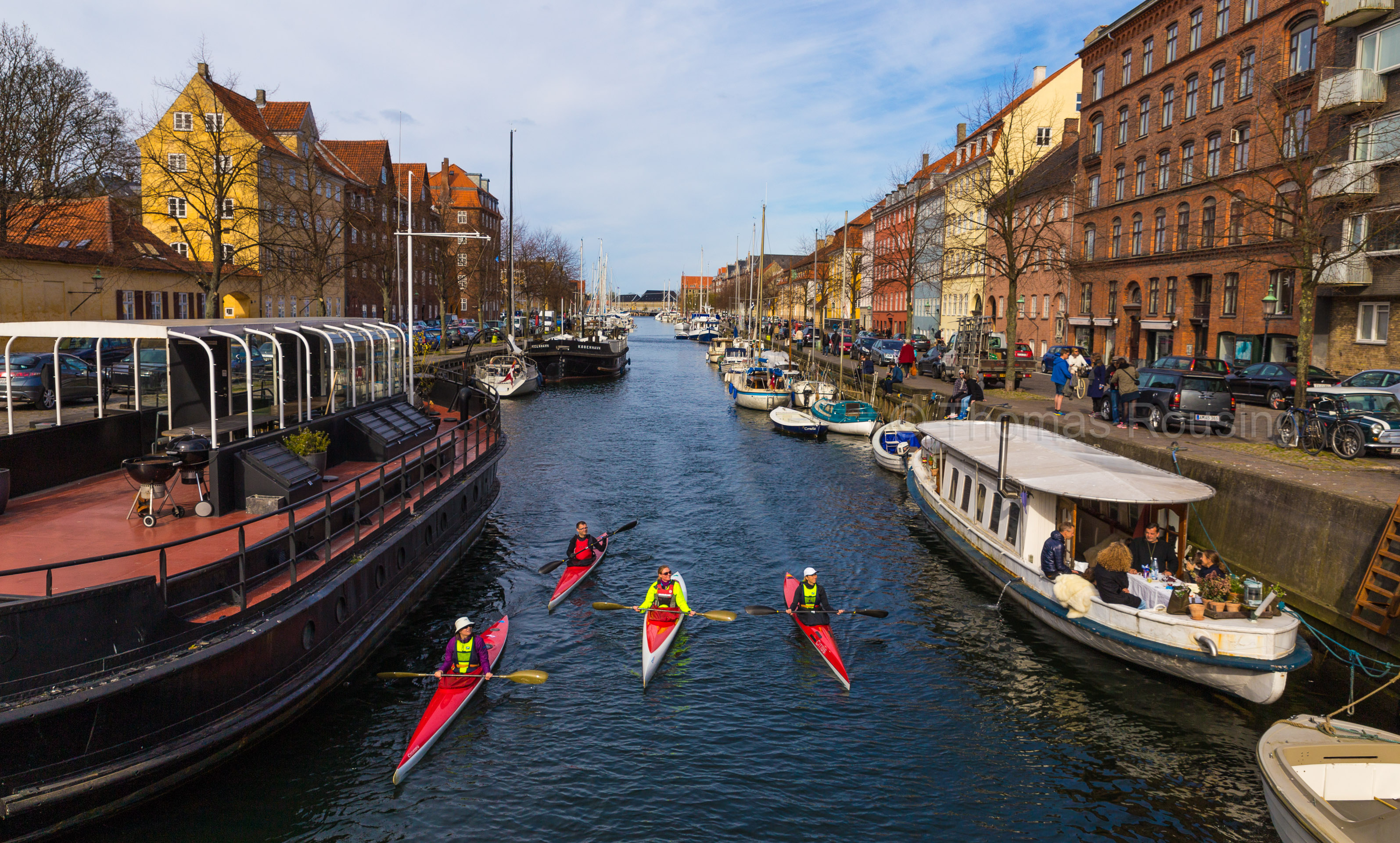
Christianshavn Canal in the centre of the neighborhood

Christianshavn (lit. '[King] Christian's Harbour') is a neighbourhood in Copenhagen, Denmark. Part of the Indre By district, it is located across several artificial islands between the islands of Zealand and Amager, and separated from the rest of the city centre by the Inner Harbour. It was founded in the early 17th century by Christian IV as part of his extension of the fortifications of Copenhagen. Originally, it was laid out as an independent privileged merchant's town inspired by Dutch cities, but it was soon incorporated into Copenhagen proper. Dominated by canals, it is the part of Copenhagen with the most nautical atmosphere.

For much of the 20th century a working-class neighbourhood, Christianshavn developed a more bohemian reputation in the 1970s and it is now a fashionable, diverse and lively part of the city with its own distinctive personality. Businessmen, students, artists, hippies and traditional families with children live side by side.

Administratively, Christianshavn has been part of Indre By since 2007, but it still has its own local council.

== Geography ==
Christianshavn covers an area of 3.43 km^{2}, and includes three minor islands to the north, jointly referred to as Holmen. It has a population of 10,140 and a population density of 2,960 per km^{2}.

To the south and east Christianshavn is defined by its old ramparts. To the west Christianshavn borders on the Inner Harbour that separates it from Slotsholmen and the rest of Copenhagen's city centre.

== History ==
Historical coat of arms of Christianshavn as an independent town

In 1612, Christian IV initiated an ambitious programme to fortify Copenhagen. During the period 1618–1623, he erected earthen embarkments with five bastions in the marshy area between Copenhagen and the island of Amager. At the same time the idea was hatched of creating a new merchant town in the area. In 1639 the little merchant and fortress town of Christianshavn was established. However, competition from Copenhagen soon proved too strong for the little town, and by 1674 it was incorporated into its larger neighbour.

The fortifications were further developed with six more bastions in the 1660s, and seven more bastions between 1682 and 1692. Additional reinforcements occurred between 1779 and 1791, and again in 1810–1813. Even though the fortifications around the Inner City were being dismantled in the late 19th century, Christianshavn's fortifications continued in use into the 20th century. Some areas were opened up in the late 1910s-1920s, and the final areas were made public space in 1961.

The fortifications are a part of the total fortification system around the old part of Copenhagen, and are one of Denmark's best preserved fortifications from the 17th century. Today the area around the fortifications is a park area.

== Christianshavn today ==
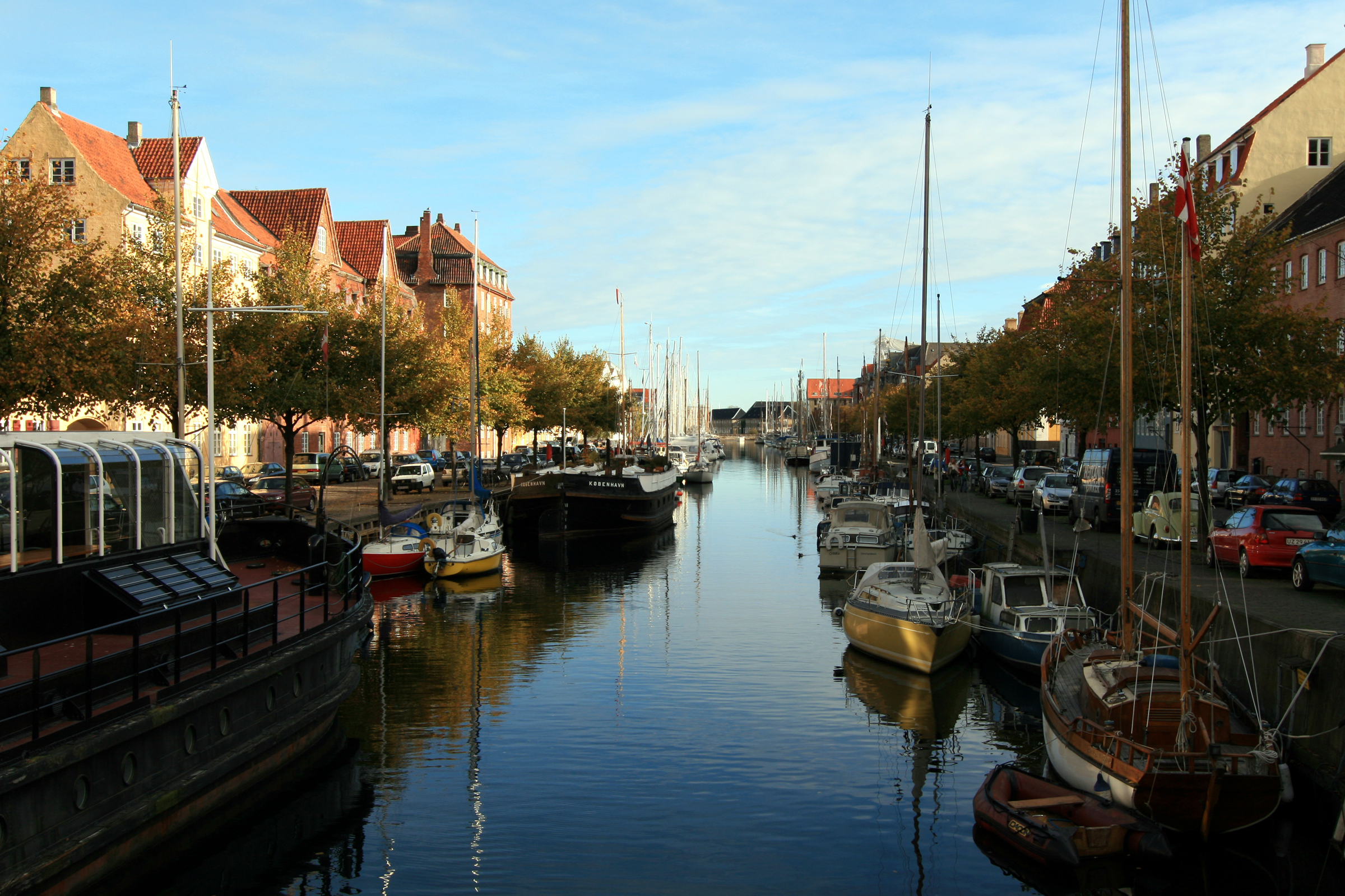
Christianshavns Kanal separating Christianshavn into a City Side and a Rampart Side part

Christianshavn is a lively, primarily residential area. It is quartered by the Christianshavn Canal, running north–south along its length, and Torvegade, the main thoroughfare of Christianshavn, running east–west, connecting Amager Side Copenhagen to the city centre across Knippelsbro. Where the canal and the street intersects, at the geographical centre of Christianshavn, lies the square Christianshavns Torv. Along the eastern shoreline of the island runs Christianshavns Vold which now serves as the principal greenspace of the neighbourhood.

The Lower City Side of Christianshavn, also known as Christiansbro, is the most affluent part of the neighbourhood, with several modern residential developments built on the grounds of the former Burmeister & Wain / B&W Shipyard. Several commercial are also found in the area, including most notably the former Danish headquarters of Nordea (now repurposed as Hotel NH Collection Copenhagen) along its entire harbourfront, while its most important historic building is Christian's Church. On the other—Rampar Side—side of the canal, the area is dominated by historic residential buildings and institutions.

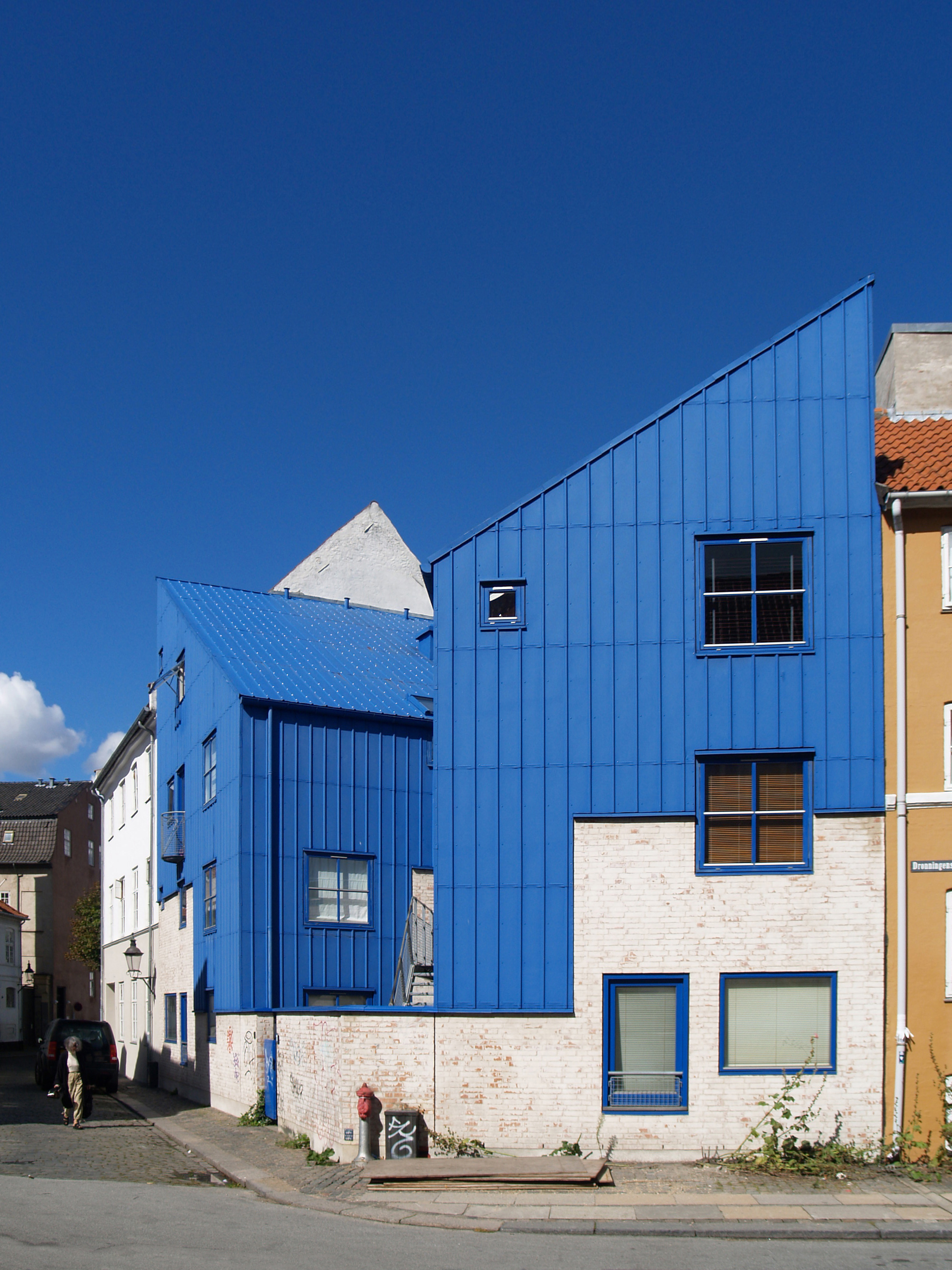
The Blue Corner by architects Vandkunsten – one of the few modern buildings in the Lower Rampart Side part of Christianshavn

Christianshavn's Upper City Side, stretching along Strandgade from Torvegade to the Trangaven Canal, is dominated by old renovated warehouses and merchant's houses. A number of large institutions are located in the area, including the Ministry of Foreign Affairs. Cultural institutions include Danish Architecture Centre and the North Atlantic House. On the other side of the canal, Christianshavn's Upper Rampart Side is the densest and most neglected part of the neighbourhood with around half of Christianshavn's 10,000 inhabitants living in that area. It is in this area that the Church of Our Saviour and Christiania are found.

Holmen is characterized by a mixture of old military buildings and new residential developments and is the home of many creative business like advertising agencies and architectural practices as well as creative educational institutions like The Royal Danish Academy of Fine Arts, School of Architecture and National Film School of Denmark.

Freetown Christiania, a partially self-governing neighborhood which has established semi-legal status as an independent community in an area of abandoned military barracks, appears as a "city within the city". It has a considerable population and is a venue for many cultural events as well as the experimental and idiosyncratic Architecture Without Architects.

== Attractions ==
- Church of Our Saviour
- Christian's Church
- North Atlantic House with Restaurant Noma
- Christiania
- Christianshavn Rampart
- Danish Architecture Centre
- Lille Mølle
- Copenhagen Opera House
- Nyholm
- Arsenal Island

== Transport ==
Christianshavn metro station is located at Christianshavns Torv at the intersection of Christianshavn Canal and Torvegade. The station serves both the M1 and M2 lines of the Copenhagen Metro.

The 901 & 902 lines of the Copenhagen Harbour Buses have a stop at Christianshavn at the end of Knippelsbro.

== Christianshavn in culture ==
- In Søren Kierkegaard's philosophical work Stages on Life's Way (1845), his pseudonymous alter ego Hilarius Bookbinder states that in Christianshavn "one is far, very far away from Copenhagen" and therefore Langebro (Long Bridge) deserves its name (Stages on Life's Way p. 259).
- The Church of Our Saviour in Christianshavn appears in a chapter of Jules Verne's A Journey to the Center of the Earth. The character Axel is made to climb the winding spire for five consecutive days by his uncle to cure him of his Acrophobia before their descent into the volcano.
- In the 1973 film Tony Arzenta, a car hunt takes Alain Delon though Christianshavn, including Torvegade and the street along the canal.
- Christianshavn has been immortalised in the then extremely popular Danish 1970s television series "Huset på Christianshavn" (English: The House on Christianshavn), one of Danish television's most popular shows ever.
- The action of Peter Høeg's novel Miss Smilla's Feeling for Snow sets off in the public housing projects 'Det Hvide Snit' (English: The White Cut, popular Danish for leukotomy) in Christianshavn.
- Christianshavns Kanal, named for the canal, is the last track on Danish singer-songwriter Kim Larsen's 1973 debut album Værsgo.
- Tom Waits wrote one of his signature songs "Tom Traubert's Blues (Four Sheets to the Wind in Copenhagen)" commonly known as "Tom Traubert's Blues" or "Waltzing Matilda") after visiting Christianshavn with Danish singer and violinist Mathilde Bondo.

== Notable people ==
- Carl Christian Hall (1812–1888), Danish statesman.
- Martin Andersen Nexø (1869–1954), Danish writer
- Jette Bang (1914–1964), Danish photographer
- Halfdan Rasmussen (1915–2002), Danish poet
- Link Wray (1929–2005), guitarist
- Tom Bogs (1944-2023), Danish middleweight boxer
- Jesper Christensen (born 1948), Danish actor
- Frank Arnesen (born 1956), Danish-footballer and sporting director
- Lukas Forchhammer (born 1988), Danish-Irish singer, songwriter

== See also ==
- Christianshavn travel guide from Wikivoyage
- Holmen
- Freetown Christiania
- Radical chic
