= Freetown Christiania =

Community in Copenhagen, Denmark

Freetown Christiania Fristaden Christiania
- Neighbourhood
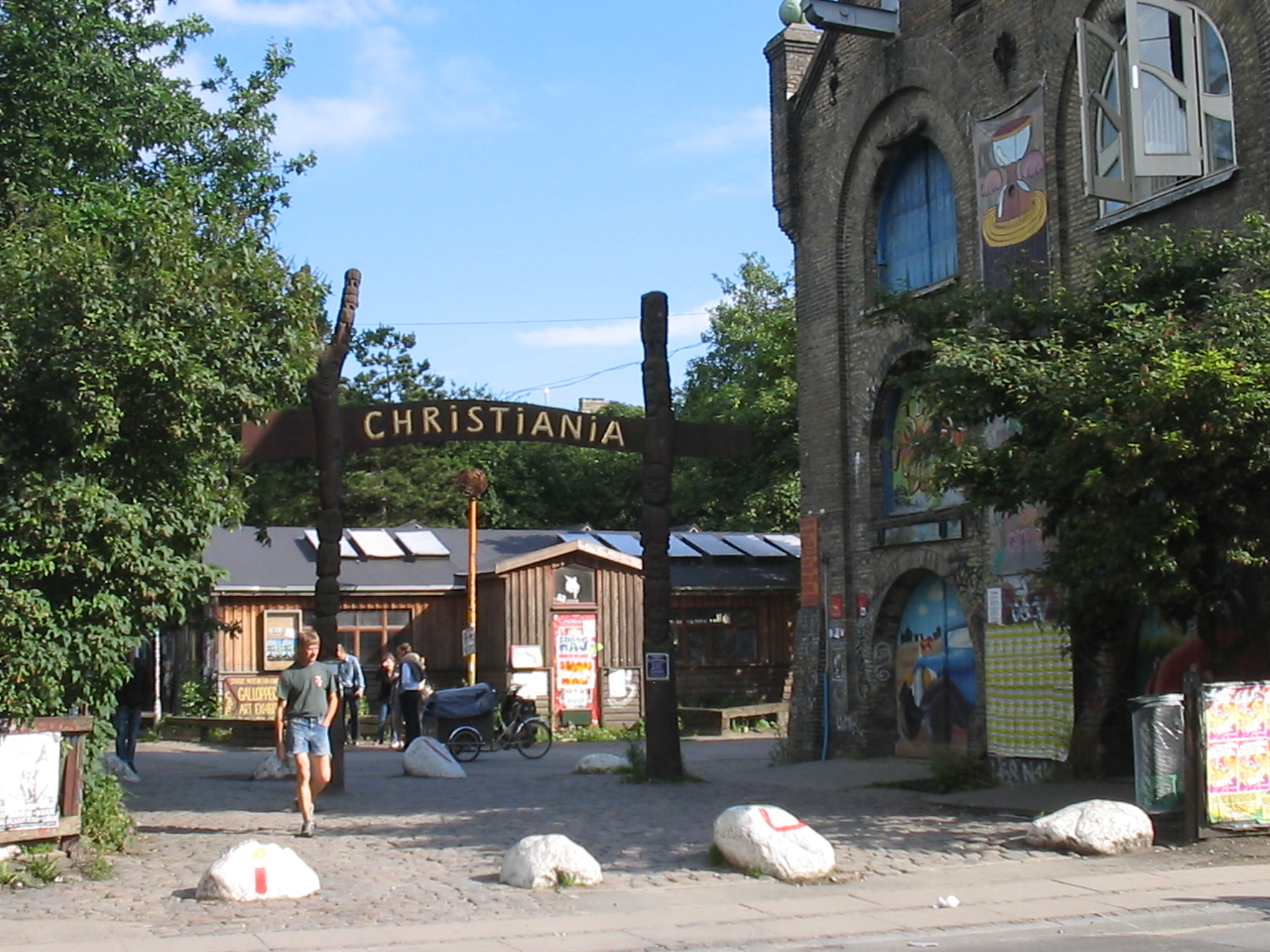
- Main entrance to Christiania

- Flag
- Nickname(s): Staden; Fristaden (the Free Town)
- Interactive map of Freetown Christiania
- Location in Copenhagen
- Coordinates (Main entrance): 55°40′25″N 12°35′59″E
- Country: Denmark
- Region: Capital Region of Denmark
- Municipality: Copenhagen Municipality
- Borough: Christianshavn
- Proclaimed: 26 September 1971
- Founder: Squatters and countercultural activists

Government
  - Type: Collective self-governance
  - Body: Residents' Plenum, working groups, and Foundation Freetown Christiania

Area
  - Total: 0.34 km^{2} (0.13 sq mi)
  - Land: 0.077 km^{2} (0.030 sq mi)

Population (2020s)
  - Total: 850–1,000
  - Density: 11,000/km^{2} (29,000/sq mi)
- Demonym(s): Christianite(s); Christianian(s)
- Time zone: UTC+1 (CET)
  - Summer (DST): UTC+2 (CEST)
- Postal code: 1440 Copenhagen K
- Calling code: +45
- ISO 3166 code: DNK
- Website: christiania.org

Freetown Christiania (Danish: Fristaden Christiania), also known as Christiania or simply Staden, is an intentional community, anarchist commune, micronation and former army barracks in the Christianshavn neighbourhood of the Danish capital city of Copenhagen. It began in 1971 as a squatted military base. Its main selling street, Pusher Street, was famous for its open illegal trade of cannabis until 2024, when a large portion of the trade was shut down in a collaborative effort between Danish police and the majority of the inhabitants, with the street being physically dug up.

== Culture ==
Christiania is considered to be the fourth largest tourist attraction in Copenhagen, with half a million visitors annually.

The residents of Christiania are called Christianit, or Christianshavner and Amagerkaner because Christiania is located on the island of Amager. The 1976 protest song "I kan ikke slå os ihjel" ("You cannot kill us"), written by Tom Lunden of flower power rock group Bifrost, became the unofficial anthem of Christiania.

== Geography ==
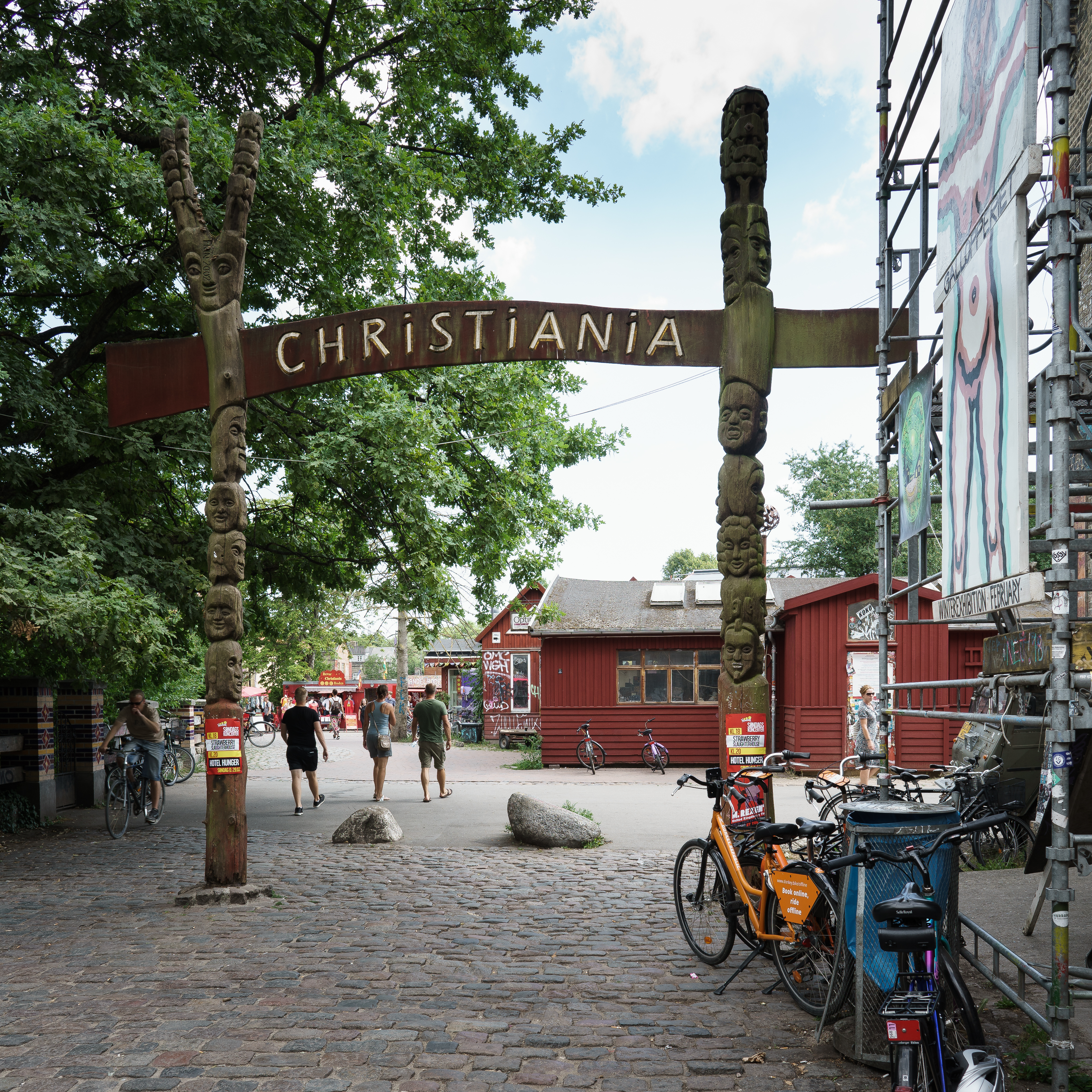
Entrance

Christiania is an intentional community and commune of about 850 to 1,000 residents, covering 7.7 hectares (19 acres) in the borough of Christianshavn in the Danish capital city of Copenhagen on the island of Amager.

The area of Christiania consists of the former military barracks of Bådsmandsstræde and parts of the city ramparts. The ramparts and the borough of Christianshavn (then a separate city) were established in 1617 by King Christian IV by reclaiming the low beaches and islets between Copenhagen and Amager. After the siege of Copenhagen during the Second Northern War, the ramparts were reinforced between 1682 and 1692 under Christian V to form a complete defence ring. The western ramparts of Copenhagen were demolished during the 19th century, but those of Christianshavn were allowed to remain. They are today considered among the finest surviving 17th century defence works in the world.

The outermost defence line, Enveloppen, has been renamed Dyssen in Christiania language (except for the southernmost tip of it which was not annexed by Christiania). It is connected to central Christiania by a bridge across the main moat or can be reached by the path beginning at Christmas Møllers Plads. Four gunpowder storehouses line the redans. They were built in 1779–1780 to replace a storage in central Copenhagen, at Østerport, which exploded in 1770, killing 50 people. The buildings are renamed Aircondition, Autogena, Fakirskolen ('the Fakir School') and Kosmiske Blomst ('Cosmic Flower') and have, although protected, been slightly altered from their historical state.

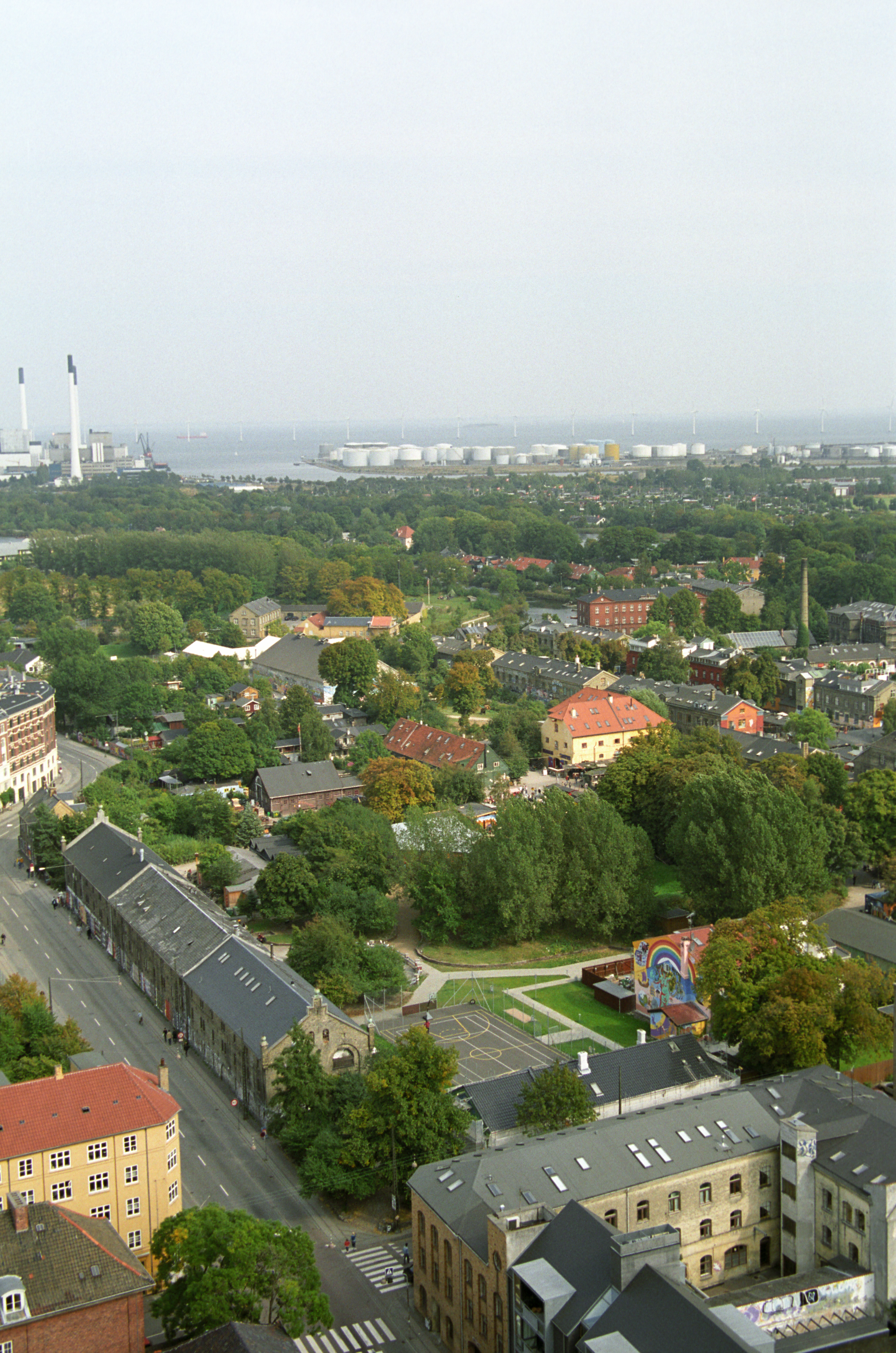
Christiania, seen from the spire of the Church of Our Saviour, September 2003

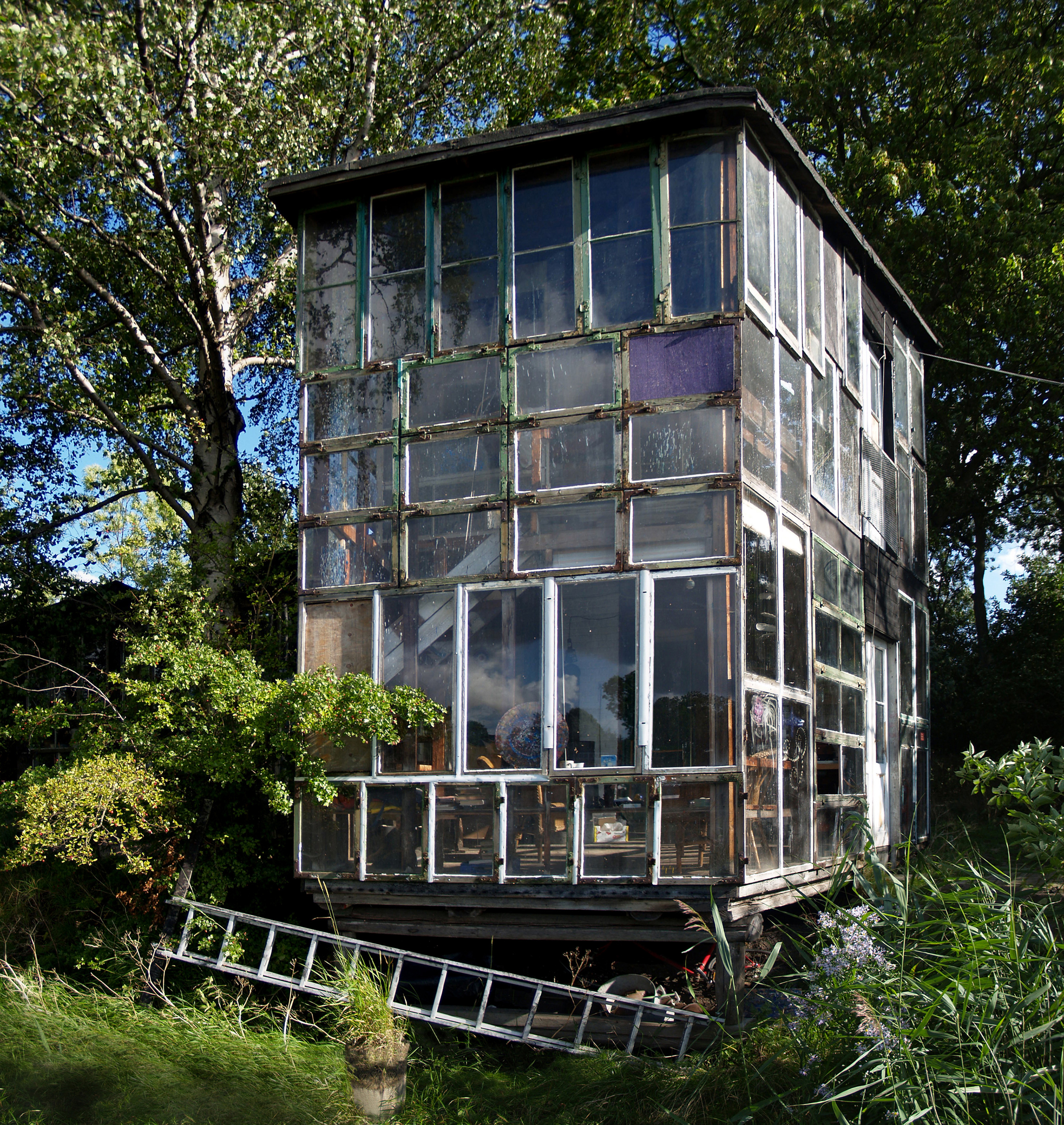
Glass house in Freetown Christiania, one of the many idiosyncratic constructions exemplifying modern "architecture without architects".

In 2007, the National Heritage Agency proposed protection status for some of the historic military buildings now in Christiania, some of which were altered after Christiania's takeover.

After bitter negotiations that temporarily resulted in the area being sealed off to the public, in June 2011, the residents of Christiania agreed to collectively set up a fund to formally purchase the land. The community made its first payment in July 2012, officially becoming legal landowners.

== History ==
=== 1970s ===
On 26 September 1971, Christiania was declared open by Jacob Ludvigsen, a well-known provo and journalist who published a magazine called Hovedbladet ('The main paper'), which was intended for and successfully distributed to mostly young people. In the paper, Ludvigsen wrote an article in which he and five others explored what he termed 'The Forbidden City of the Military'. The article widely announced the proclamation of the free town, and among other things he wrote the following under the headline "Civilians conquered the 'forbidden city' of the military": Although Christiania enjoyed an initial blind eye from the authorities, The Ministry of Defence brought a legal case against Christiania on 1 April 1976, which was upheld by the Supreme Court on 2 February 1978, who ruled that Christiania should be cleared immediately. However, despite the ruling, immediate action was not taken and that same year the Danish Parliament, Folketinget, decided that a development plan should be drafted first.

In addition to these external problems, pressure was building internally as well: Following the death of 10 residents in the space of one year from overdoses, in 1979 the residents of Christiania began the "Junk Blockade". For 40 days and nights, residents patrolled the buildings where hard drugs were sold and sought to push the dealers out of the community while offering aid to the addicts.

=== 1980s ===
During the 1980s, motorcycle gangs fought their way into Christiania, seeking to gain control over the drug market. One gang in particular, Bullshit Motorcycle Club, managed to fight off a chapter of the Hells Angels to establish sole control of the drugs market by 1984. In 1987, after police found the dismembered body of a man under the floorboards of a Bullshitter bike shop inside Christiania, the Bullshitters were broken up and cleared from the area following a combined response from the community, the police and reprisals from the Hells' Angels. From that point on, biker jackets were banned from the Freetown.

In 1989 the Danish Parliament legalised Christiania.

=== 2000s ===
In April 2005, a gang shot and killed a man in Christiania and injured three others in an incident related to Christiania's cannabis trade.

On 14 May 2007, workers from the governmental Forest and Nature Agency, accompanied by police, entered Christiania to demolish leftovers of the small, abandoned building of Cigarkassen ('the cigar box'). They were met by angry and frightened Christianites, fearing that the police also intended to demolish other houses. The residents built roadblocks, but the police eventually entered the Freetown en masse and were met by resistance. Residents threw stones and shot fireworks at police vehicles. They also built barricades in the street outside Christiania's gate. The police used tear gas on the residents and a number of arrests were made. One activist sneaked behind the police commander and poured a bucket of urine and faeces upon him before being immediately arrested. The trouble continued into the early morning hours. In all, over 50 activists from both Christiania and outside were arrested. Prosecutors demanded they be imprisoned on the basis that they might otherwise participate in further disturbances in Copenhagen (which prosecutors claimed was "in a state of rebellion").

On 24 April 2009, a 22-year-old man had part of his jaw blown off by a hand grenade thrown into the crowds seated at Cafe Nemoland. Four others had minor injuries.

=== 2016 shooting and end of Pusher Street stalls ===
On 31 August 2016, a person believed by police to be carrying earnings from cannabis sales shot two police officers and a civilian after being stopped. The injuries of one of the officers who was shot in the head were life-threatening and required a long period of rehabilitation, while the other victims had lesser injuries. Police sealed off the entire neighbourhood and located the perpetrator in Kastrup a few hours later. During a brief shootout with special police unit Politiets Aktionsstyrke he was seriously wounded and later died from his injuries in the hospital. The perpetrator, a 25-year-old Danish citizen of Bosnian descent who he arrived in Denmark as a child, was well known to the police for violence and involvement in cannabis sales. Although known to be a sympathiser with Islamic extremism, this is not considered to have played a role in his actions. Police officers very rarely receive life-threatening injuries during encounters with criminals (at the moment of the Christiania shooting, the last killing of a police officer by a criminal in Denmark had been in 1995) and the incident was widely condemned.

In a communal meeting consisting of Christiania residents, it was decided that the stalls in Pusher Street, the site of the largest cannabis sales in Denmark, should be removed. This decision was carried the following day, 2 September 2016. Local residents also urged people who were friends of the neighbourhood to help by not buying cannabis in Christiania. About two months later, it was estimated that the de facto practice of cannabis sales within Christiania had dropped by about 75%.

When locals blocked the entrances to Pusher Street with concrete barriers and bars in August 2023, a resident said they were advocating not to buy the drugs in Christiania, and that the money earned by dealers in "Pusher Street" didn't finance Christiania, but gangs. The marijuana market continued despite frequent police raids.

=== 2023 shooting ===
On 26 August 2023, two masked gunmen opened fire in Christiania, killing a 30-year-old man and injuring four other people. According to the police, the shooting was related to a conflict between gangs. After the shooting, the residents reiterated their inability to throw the gangs off the street without help. Residents voted to close Pusher Street and asked for government help to close the market.

Due to the worsening gang violence, residents were considering a proposition by the Danish government to buy the rest of the land with the proviso that they accommodate a 15,000-square-metre (3 1/2-acre) public housing development. This agreement would provide Christiania residents with help curbing the violence and the city with needed housing.

== Economy ==
=== Pusher Street ===
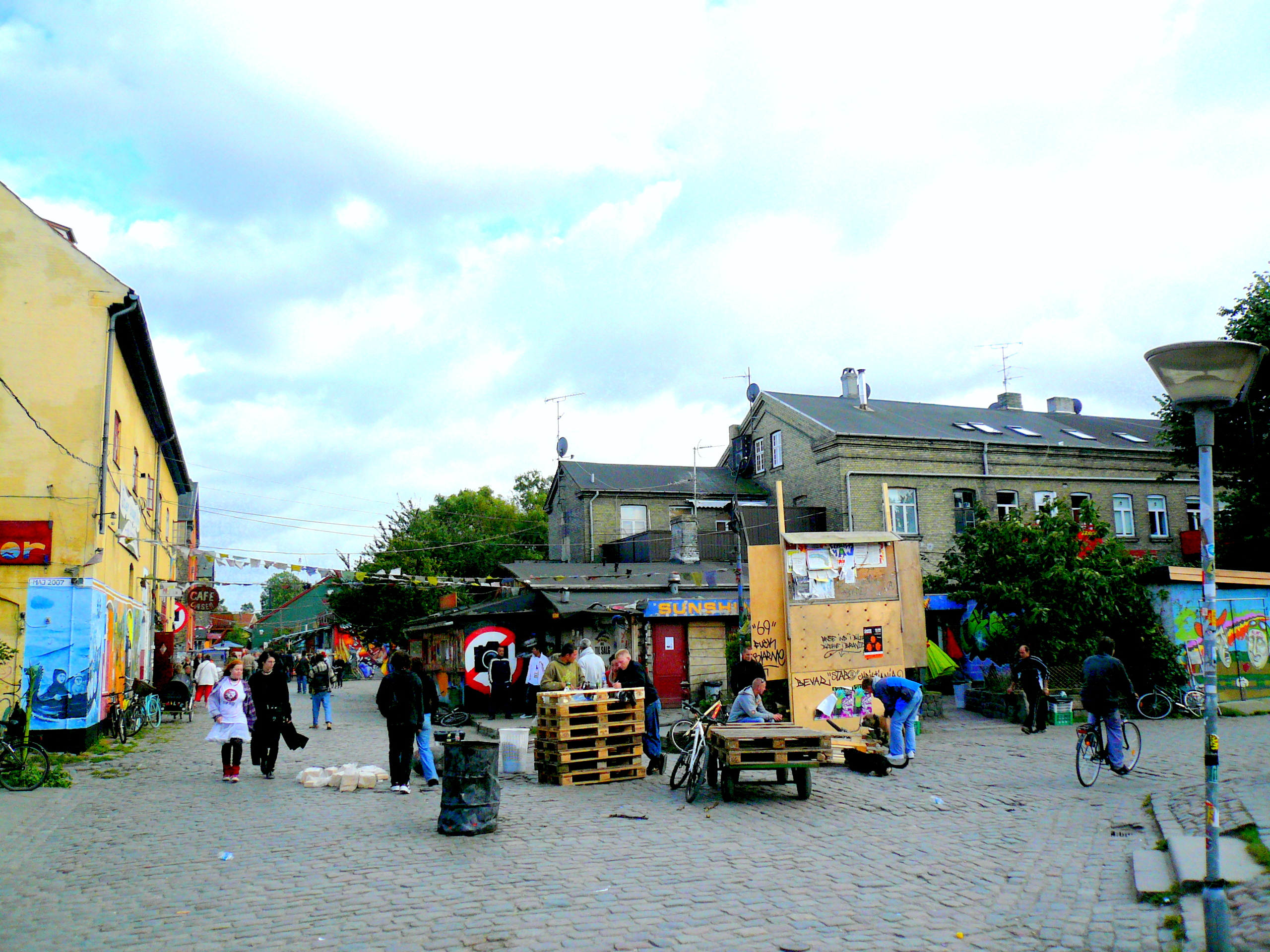
Pusher Street in 2007, after eviction of the hash stands. A 'no photo sign' remains. The street was removed in 2024.

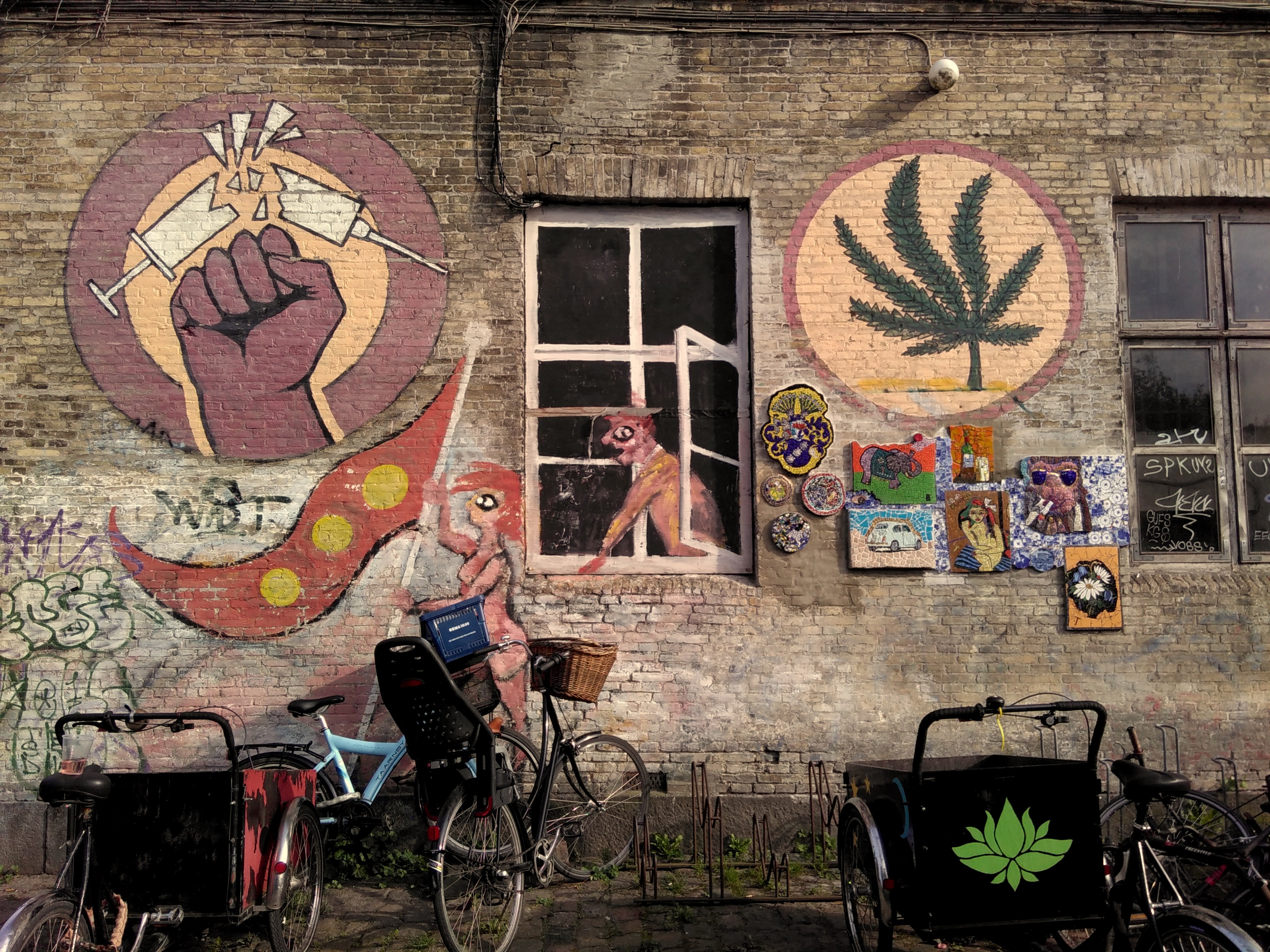
Murals and signs around Christiania make the community's opposition to heroin clear

Since its opening, Christiania has been famous for its open cannabis trade, taking place in the centrally located Pusher Street, dubbed the "Green Light District" by the Christianian council. Although the hash trade is illegal, authorities were for many years reluctant to forcibly stop it. Proponents thought that concentrating the hash trade at one place would limit its dispersion in society, and that it could prevent users from switching to 'harder drugs'. Some wanted to legalise hash altogether. Opponents thought the ban should be enforced, in Christiania as elsewhere, and that there should be no differentiation between 'soft' and 'hard' drugs. It has also been claimed that the open cannabis trade was one of Copenhagen's major tourist attractions, while some said it scared other potential tourists away and the cannabis sale is actually also forbidden on Christiania's area. Even though the police have attempted to stop the drug trade, the cannabis market has generally thrived in Christiania. When local residents removed the Pusher Street stalls in 2016, it was estimated that the cannabis sale dropped by about 75%.

In 2002, the government began aiming to make the cannabis trade less visible. In response, the cannabis sellers covered their stands in military camouflage nets as a humorous reply. The open cannabis trade returned to Pusher Street after police raids in 2004, but the stalls were again torn down by Christiania's residents after the 2016 shooting. As of June 2023, there were numerous cannabis sellers on Pusher Street openly selling their wares from makeshift stalls with spray painted signs advertising the strain of cannabis for sale. One dealer said the police raid the street daily, but an early warning system of lookouts allows the dealers to close up shop before the police arrive. In August 2023, residents blocked the entrances to Pusher Street with concrete barriers and bars.

== Further developments ==
Christiania has countered the government's plans for normalisation with its own community-driven planning proposal, which after eight months of internal workshops and meetings gained consensus at the common meeting before being published in early 2006. Christiania's own development plan was awarded the Initiative Award of the Society for the Beautification of Copenhagen in November 2006.

In September 2007, the representatives of Christiania and Copenhagen's city council reached an agreement to cede control of Christiania to the city over the course of ten years for the purposes of business development. Also, as of May 2009, the Eastern High Court upheld a 2004 Act of Parliament which reaffirmed the state's legal claim to control of the base. This rule is confirmed in February 2011 by the Supreme Court. The state has now full right of disposal of the Christiania area. In June 2011, the State signed an agreement with Christiania stating that the Christiania area will be transferred to a new foundation, the Foundation Freetown Christiania.

The most contentious part of this process has been to force the residents naturally opposed to the whole idea of ownership to buy the piece of land they have been occupying for more than 40 years. In July 2012, they made the first payment, and the Christianites went from squatters to legal landowners. A foundation, run by residents, was set up to raise funds and apply for a bank loan. Christianites were able to buy about 19 acres of the initial 84-acre plot.

In his January 2013 book In the Name of the People, Ivo Mosley cited Christiania as one of the few examples of communities run on truly democratic lines that exist in the world. Six months later, the laws governing Christiania changed. In July 2013, the legislative proposal L 179 for the repealing of the Christiania Law was adopted by all parties in the Folketing with the exception of the Danish People's Party. From that moment, the same legislative rules that apply to the rest of Denmark apply to Christiania.

Christiania native Lukas Forchhammer of the Danish pop band Lukas Graham wrote the 2016 song "Mama Said" about his experience growing up in the community.

The mid-2010s documentary Christiania: 40 Years of Occupation covers the community's history.

Freetown Christiania featured prominently in the script for the third episode of the 2016 Trailer Park Boys spinoff "Out of the Park: Europe".

== See also ==
- Anarchism in Denmark
- Dyssebroen
- Counter-economics
- Taylor Camp
- Ungdomshuset
- Kingdom of Elleore
- Squatting
- Ruigoord
- Christianshavn Station
- Metelkova
- Capitol Hill Autonomous Zone
- Nimbin, New South Wales
- Black Rock City
- Anarchitecture
