= Farimagsgade =

Street in Copenhagen, Denmark

Coordinates: 55°41′30″N 12°34′35″E

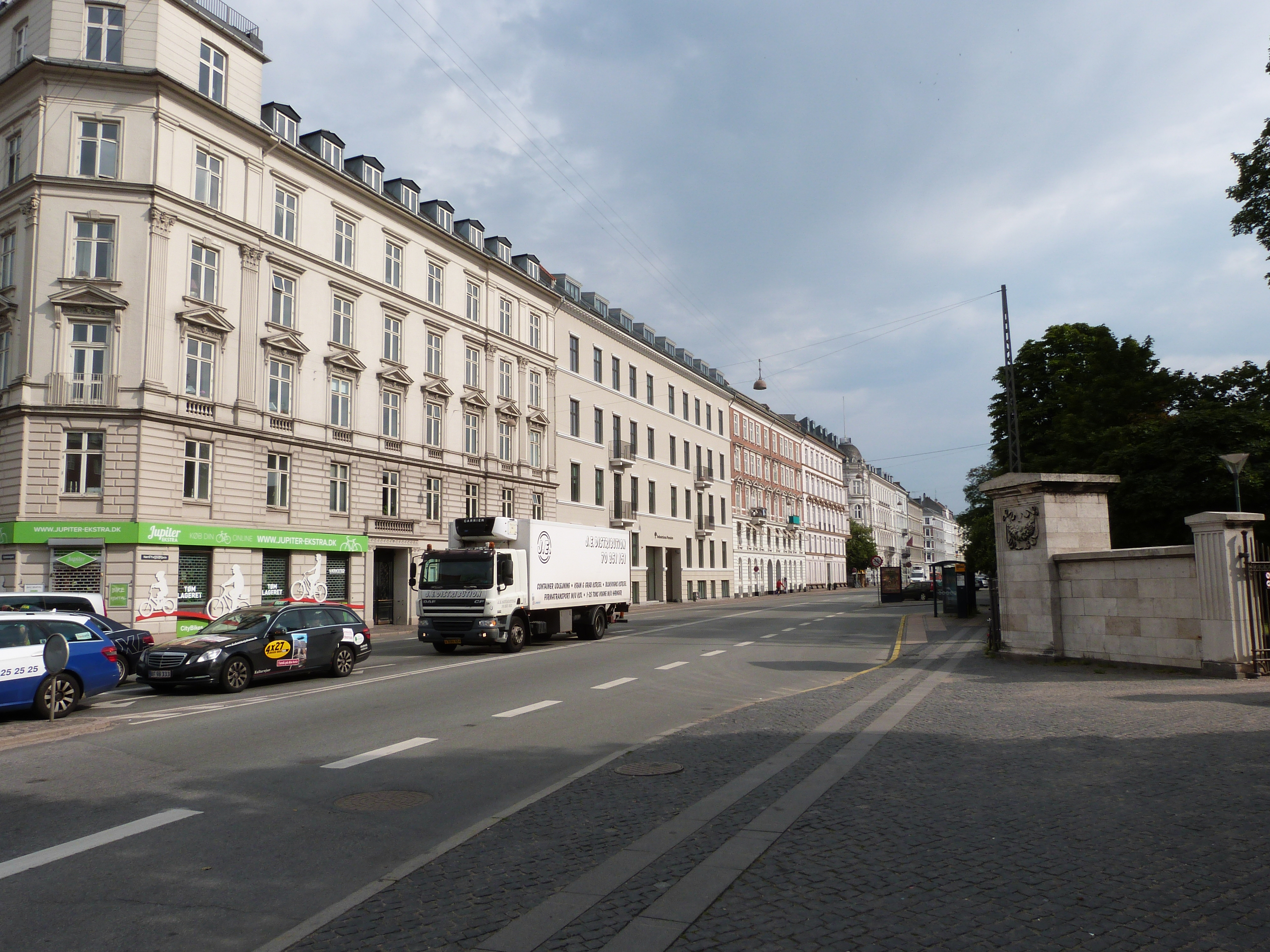
Nørre Farimagsgade at the entrance to Ørsted Park

Vester Farimagsgade, Nørre Farimagsgade and Øster Farimagsgade (lit. 'West, North and East Farimagsgade') is a succession of streets which together connect the south-western Vesterbro to the northern Østerbro along the periphery of the city centre in Copenhagen, Denmark. A continuation of Reventlowsgade, Vester Farimagsgade extends from Vesterbrogade at Vesterport Station and initially runs along the sunken railway tracks on the left before soon reaching H. C. Andersens Boulevard. It then turns into Nørre Farimagsgade and continues behind Ørsted Park to Gothersgade where it becomes Øster Farimagsgade and proceeds along another green space, the Copenhagen Botanical Garden, passes Sølvtorvet and the neighbourhood of terraced houses known as Kartoffelrækkerne before terminating at Lille Triangel where Østerbrogade begins.

== History ==
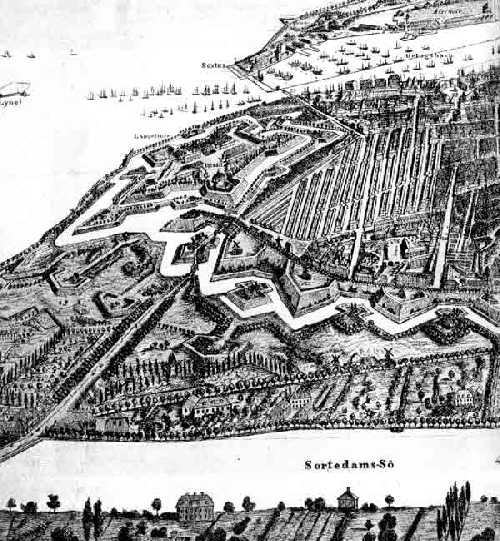
A detail from a topographical picture of Copenhagen from 1856: The northern section of the Farimagsvejen road, today Øster Farimagsgade, is seen in the bottom between the fortifications and the Sortedam Lake

Originally known as Farimagsvejen, the history of the street goes back a long way. It originally ran just outside Copenhagen's Bastioned Fortification Ring. It provided a connection between the area outside the Western City Gate in the south and the area outside the Eastern City Gate and Sortedam Lake in the north, saving travellers and residents of the surrounding villages the trouble of passing through the city gates and the crowded city.

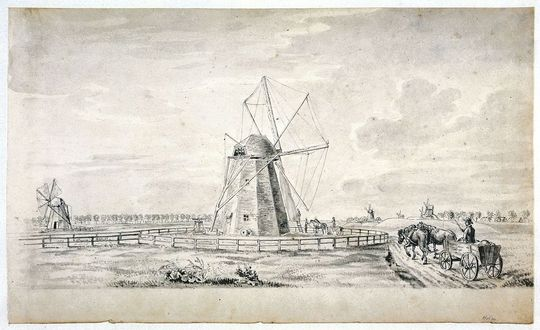
Farimagsgade, c. 1825. Drawing by H.G.F. Holm

Since heavy restrictions on construction of new buildings outside the fortifications within a certain distance known a Line of Demarcation were introduced in 1661 following the Assault on Copenhagen, the road passed through a decidedly rural setting.

After the expansion of the Fortification Ring was finally completed during the Great Northern War, the southern part of the road was given a new course further away from the city. Architect and urban planner Ferdinand Meldahl published a proposal for the road to be taken back to its old course in Illustreret Tidende on 14 January 1866. It was adopted by the City Council with the masterplan of 1872.

After the fortifications were finally demolished in the late 1850s, the entire area came under redevelopment. The first major building to go up along the road was the Copenhagen Municipal Hospital, built from 1859 to 1863 to the design of Christian Hansen who had returned from Greece a few years earlier. Its location in open land outside the city was chosen after the large cholera outbreak of 1853.

== Notable buildings and residents ==
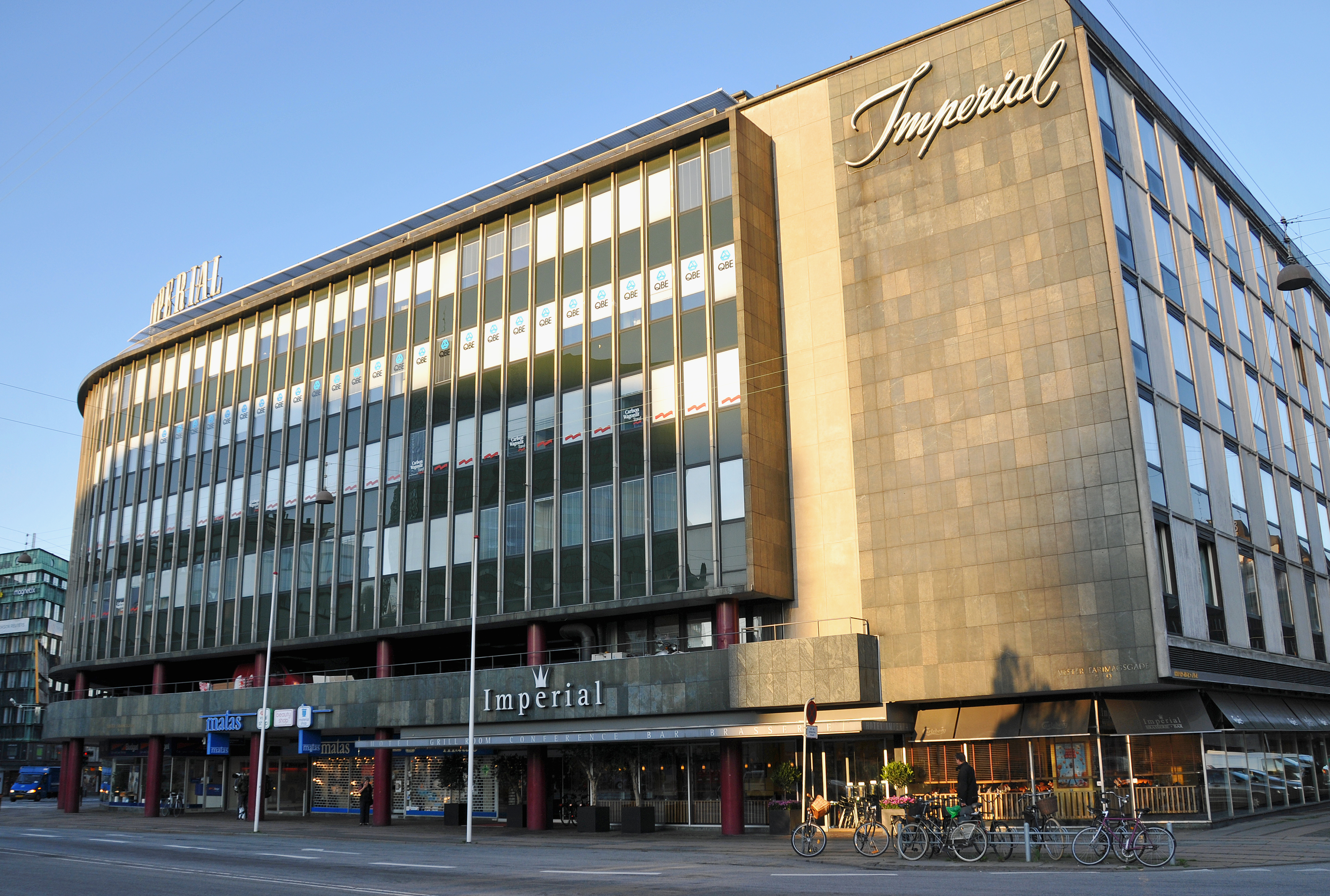
The Imperial Building

=== Vester Farimagsgade ===
Hotel Imperial (No. 9) is from 1958. No. 27–31 is from 1935 and was originally built from the Danish Engineers' Association. The Danish Technological Institute's original home is located at the corner of H. C. Andersens Boulevard (Staunings Plads 1–3). It was built in two phases to designs by Svend Sinding (1918) and Gotfred Tvede (1926–1927). The Technological Institute left the building in 1973 and it now houses the trade union FOA.

=== Nørre Farimagsgade ===
Det Kongelige Vajsenhus (No. 51), originally a royal orphanage, was founded in 1627 at Christiansborg. It moved to its current home in 1875 and is now a primary school.

=== Øster Farimagsgade ===
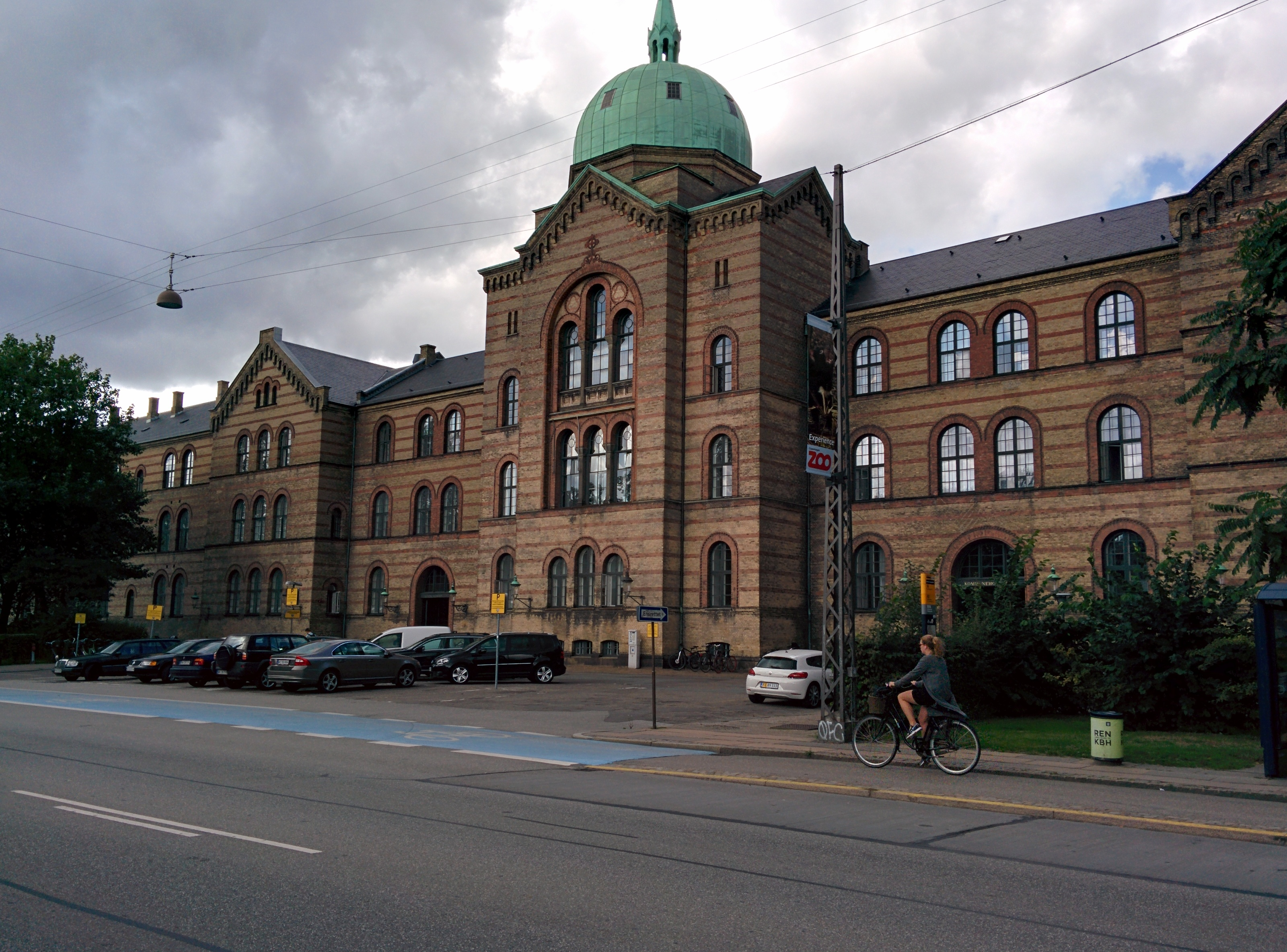
University of Copenhagen's City Campus

Completed in 1869, Copenhagen Municipal Hospital was one of the first buildings to be completed outside Copenhagen's former fortifications. It is now part of University of Copenhagen's City Campus.

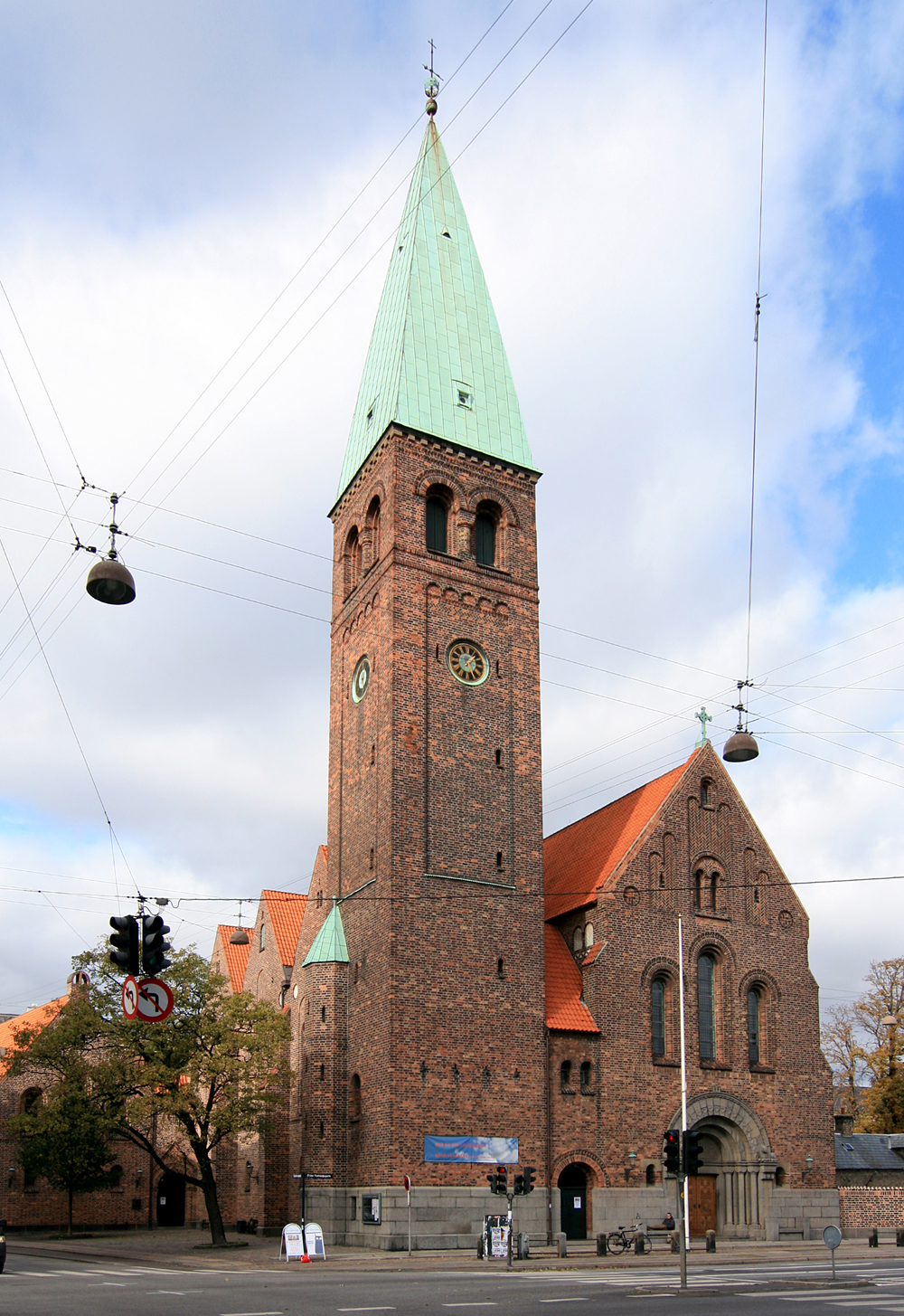
St Andrew's Church

St Andrew's Church, on the corner with Gothersgade, was completed in 1901 according to the design by Martin Borch.

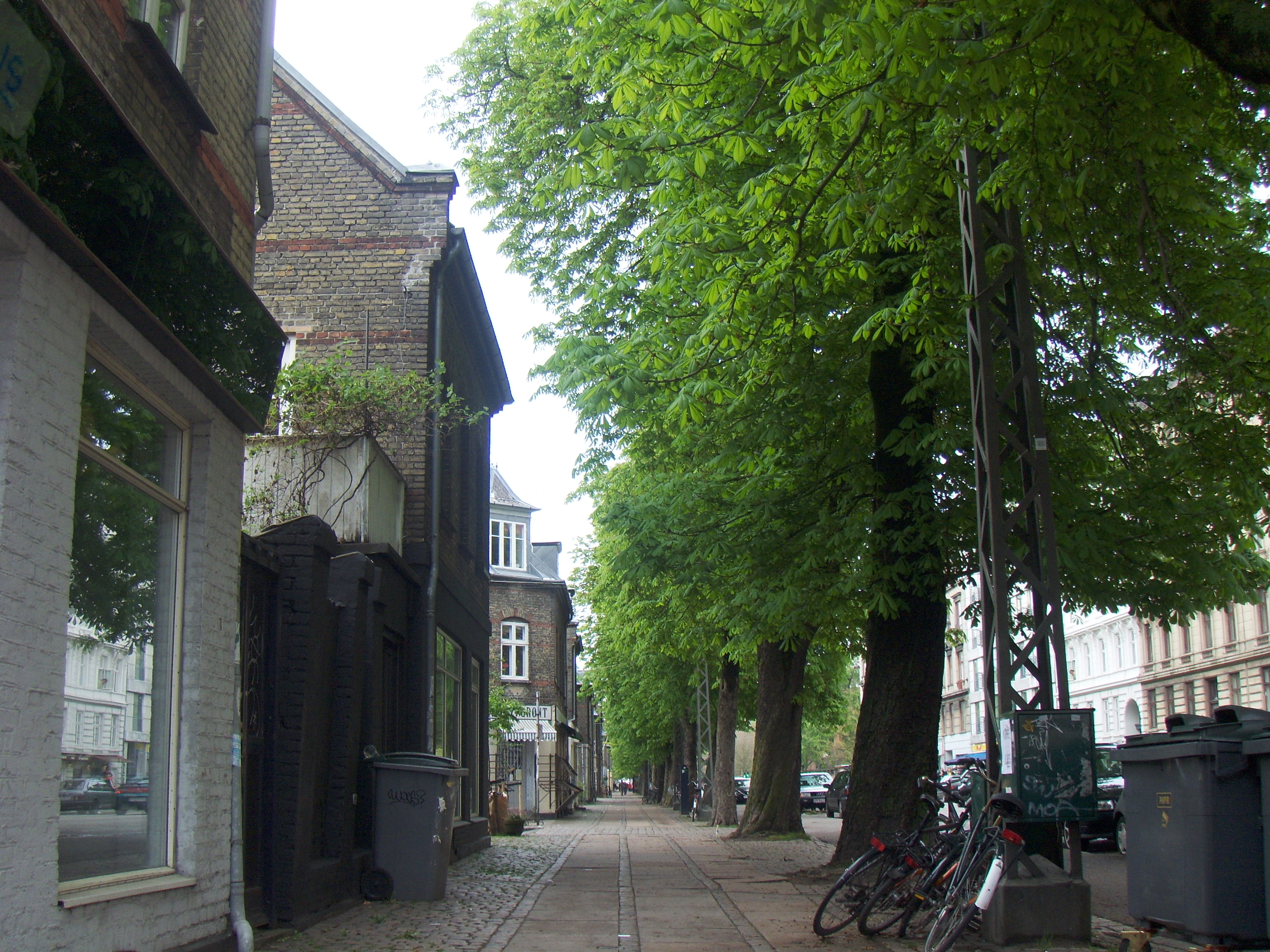
Øster Farimagsgade at Kartoffelrækkerne

The last section of the street passes the terraced housing development Kartoffelrækkerne (The Potato Rows) which was built by the Worker's Building Society between 1873 and 1889. Øster Farimagsgade School was designed by Hans Jørgen Holm and opened in 1885. St. Andrew's Church was built at the corner of Gothersgade and Øster Farimagsgade to serve the inhabitants of the new neighbourhood. Its architect was Martin Borch.

== See also ==
- Vester, Nørre and Øster Søgade
- Vester, Nørre and Øster Voldgade
