= Listed buildings in Billund Municipality =

This is a list of listed buildings in Billund Municipality, Denmark.

== The list ==
Listing name	Image	Location	Coordinates	Description
Gyttegård		Billundvej 47, 7250 Hejnsvig	55°42′36.34″N 9°2′14.44″E	House from 1916 designed by Martin Borch
