= Vingårdstræde =

Street in Copenhagen, Denmark

Coordinates: 55.6787°N 12.5831°E

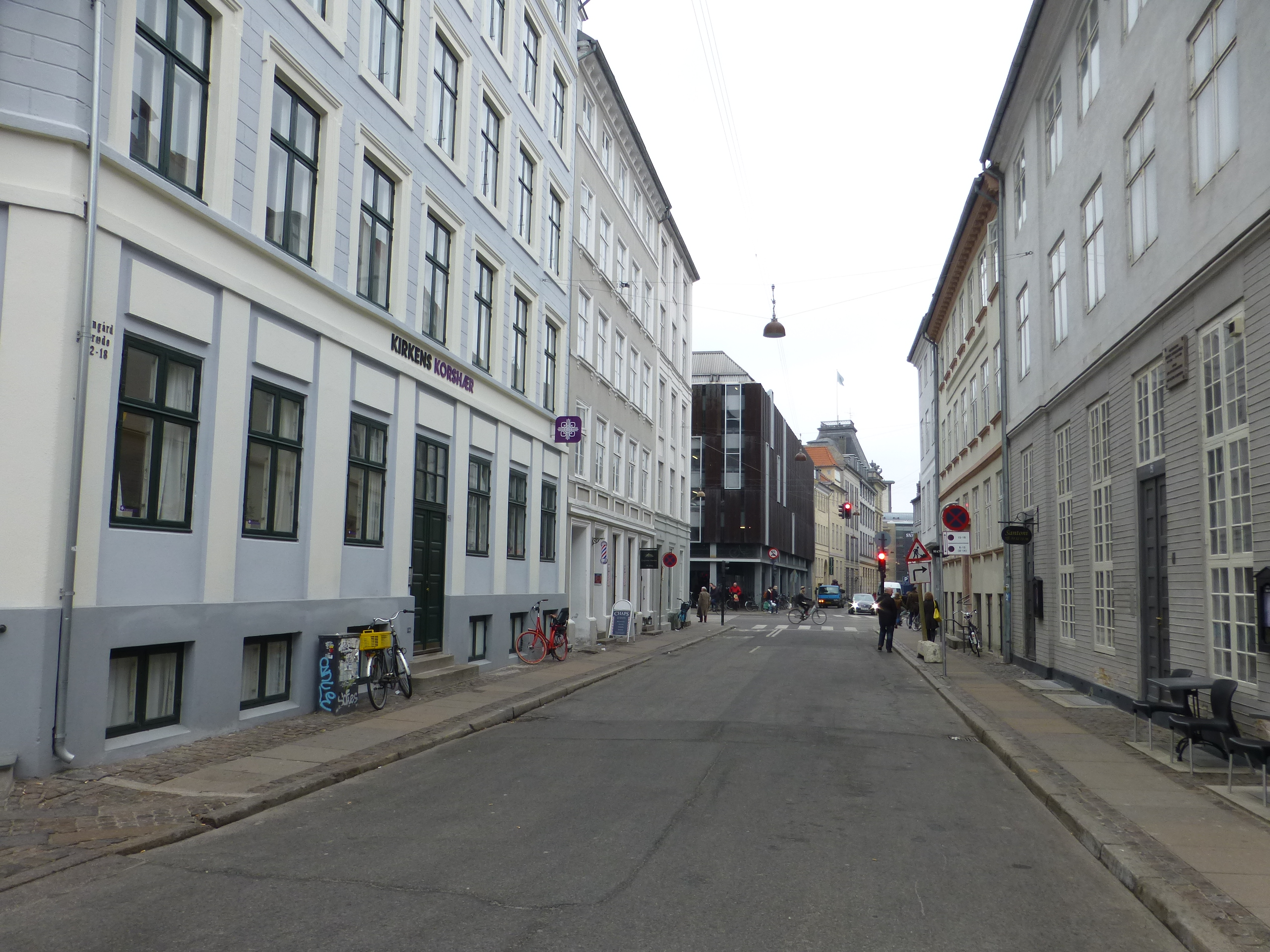
Vingårdstræde

Vingårdstræde is a street in the Old Town of Copenhagen, Denmark. The first part of the street passes the south side of the Magasin du Nord department store and the north side of Danske Bank's headquarters.

== History ==
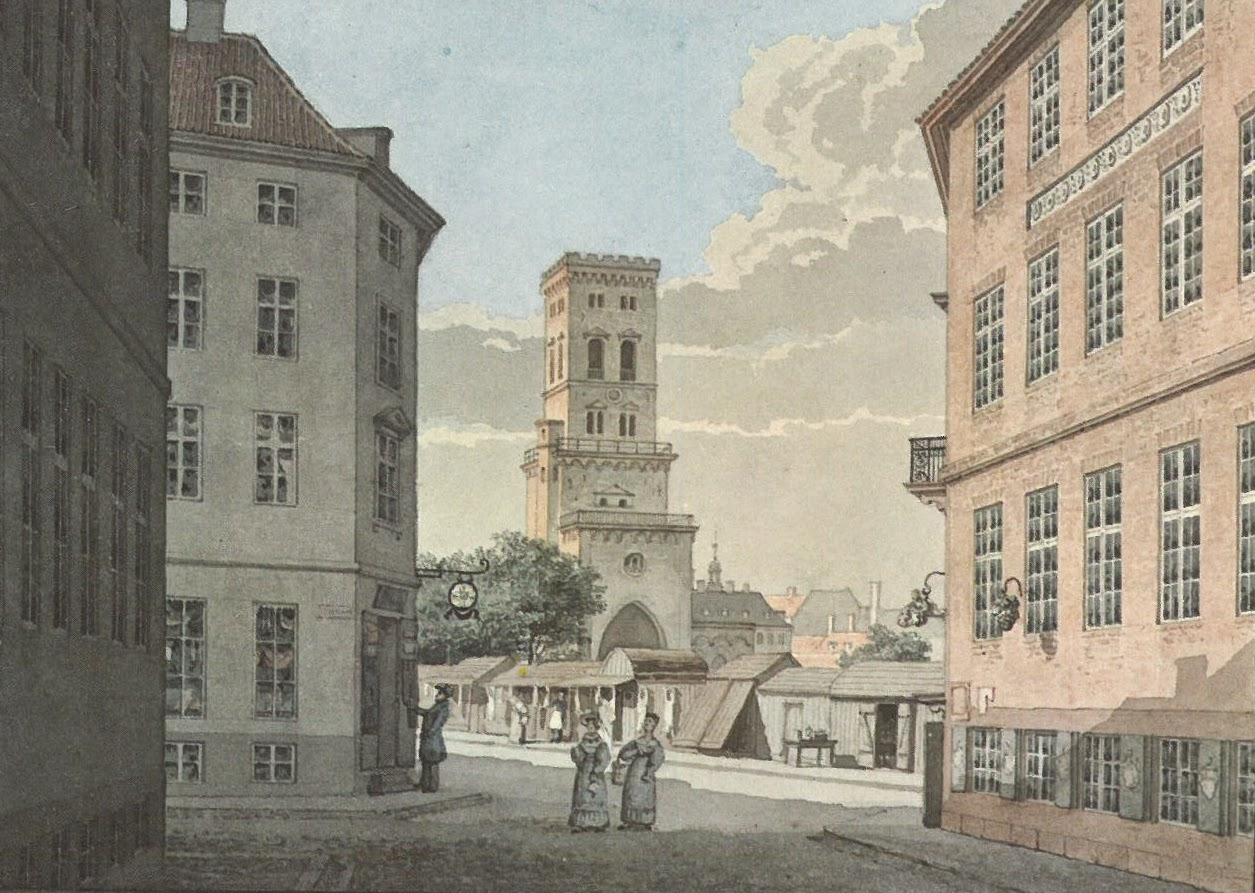
Nikolaj Plads viewed from Vingårdstræde in 1835, watercolour by Heinrich Gustav Ferdinand Holm

The street takes its name after Kong Hans' Vingård, a medieval stone house probably built by Eric of Pomerania in about 1450. King Hans had a vineyard at the site which in turn gave it its name. It is believed that its cellar was the first home of the Royal Mint in Copenhagen. In 1541 the Royal Mint relocated to the nearby grounds of the former St. Clare's Monastery, which had been confiscated in 1536 when Denmark officially became a Lutheran nation.

The street was completely destroyed in the Copenhagen Fire of 1795. The name was spelled Vingårdsstræde until the 1930s.

All the buildings at the eastern end of the street were greducally acquired by Danske Bank and several of them were replaced by modern office buildings in the 1970s.

== Notable buildings and residents ==
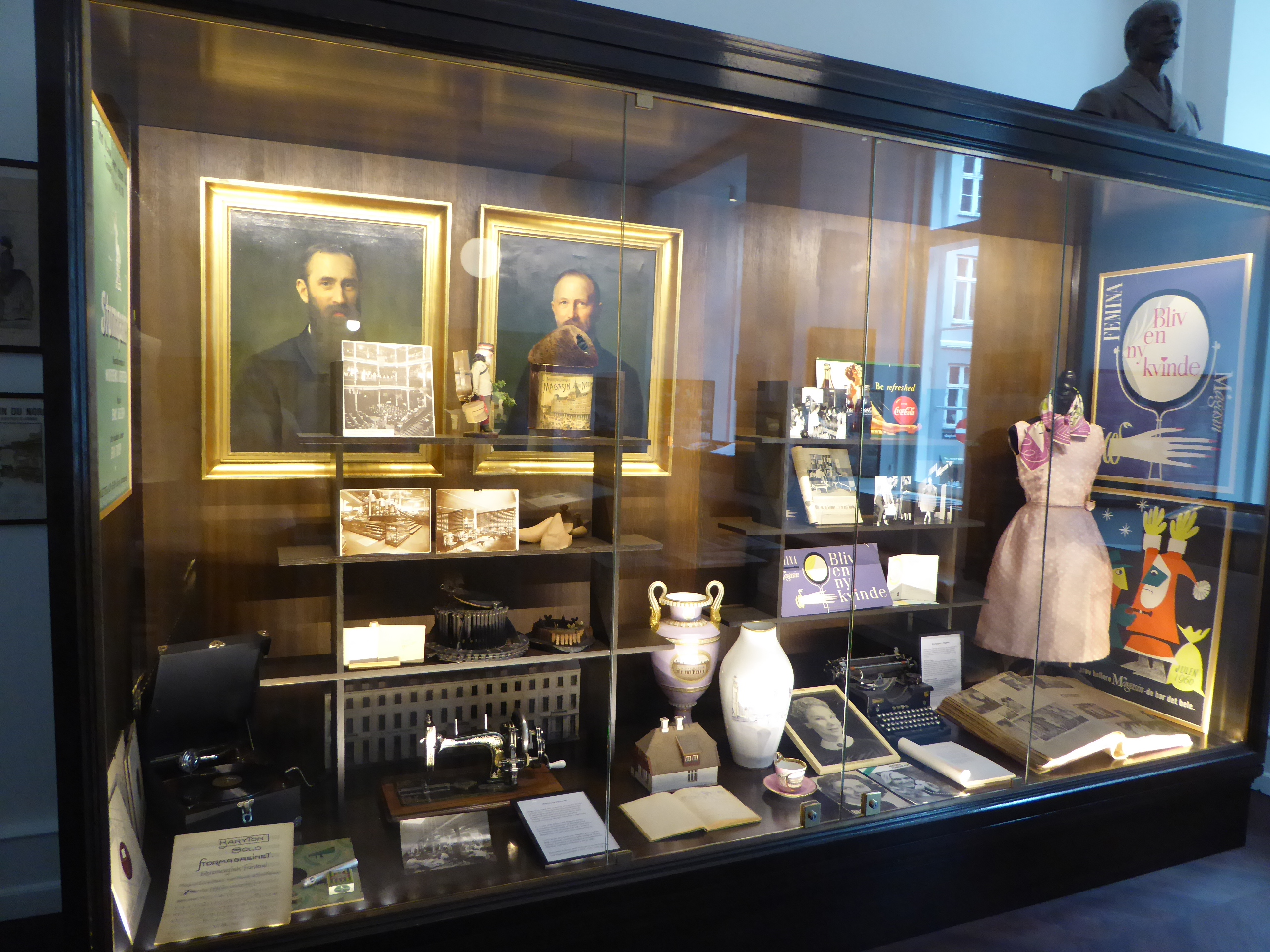
Inside the Magasin du Nord museum

Kong Hans Vinhus (King John's Wine House) at No. 6 traces its history back to the 15th century although little more than the vaulted cellar survives of the original building. It was extended with two extra floors in 1783–84, and the current facade dates from 1796. The narrow side wing with the gate dates from 1830 to 1831. The building was acquired by neighbouring Magasin du Nord in connection with an expansion in the 1970s and now houses a small museum dedicated to the history of the department store. The one Michelin star restaurant Kong Hans Kælder is located in the cellar.

No. 19 and No. 21 date from the rebuilding of the area in the late 1790s and are both listed. Half a century younger, No. 18, 20 and 22 were all built in 1849–51 to design by Peter Christoph Hagemann and are also listed.

The building at Vingårdstræde 3 and Laksegade 4 is from 1928 and was designed by Carl Brummer
