= Amager Boulevard =

Street in Copenhagen, Denmark

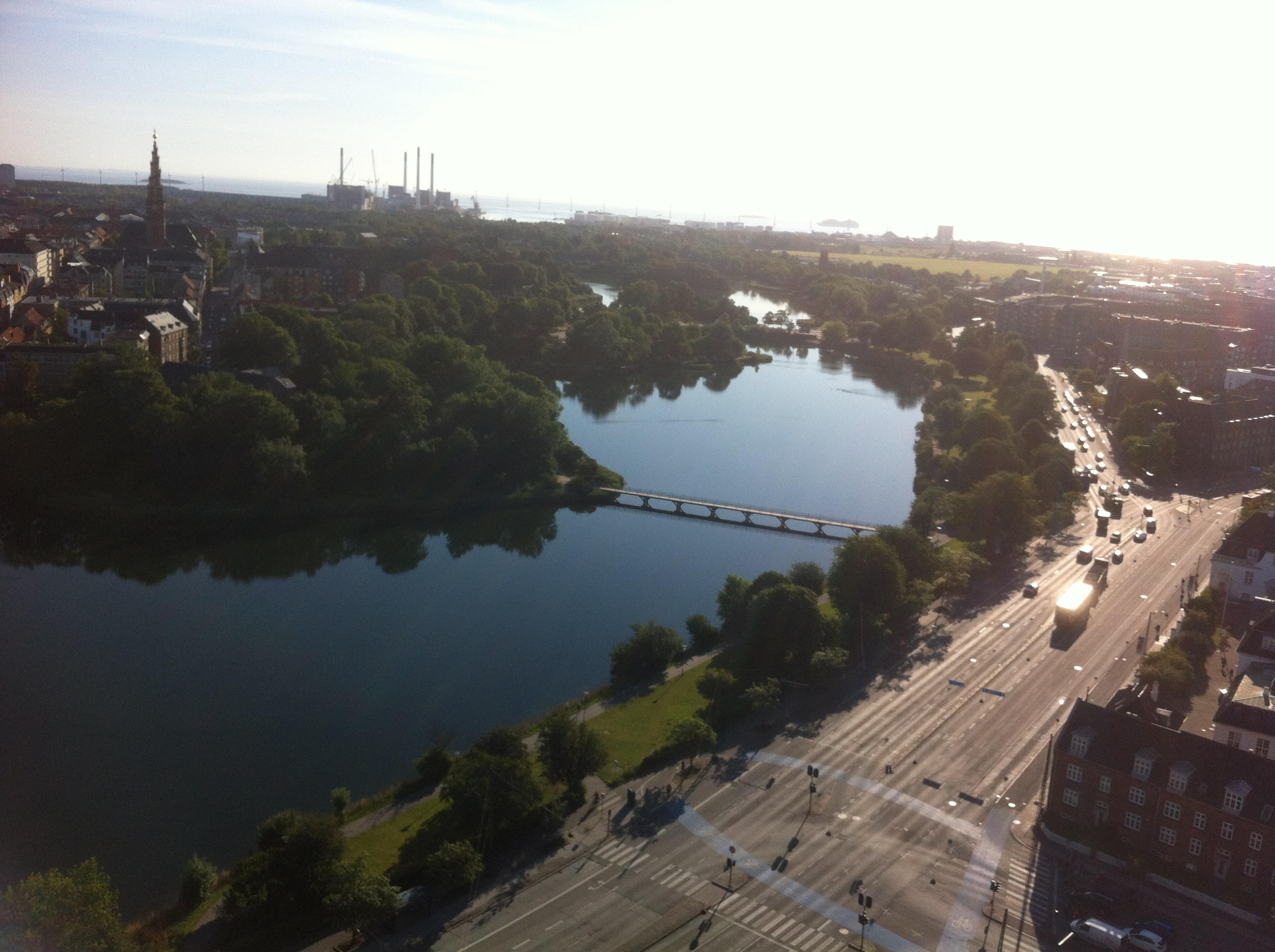
- Amager Boulevard with Stadsgreven to the left as seen from Hotel Tadison Blue Scandinavia
- Length: 1,260 m (4,130 ft)
- Location: Amager, Copenhagen, Denmark
- Postal code: 2300
- Coordinates: 55°41′6″N 12°34′10.08″E

Amager Boulevard is a street on Amager in Copenhagen, Denmark. It begins at Langebro Bridge and initially follows Stadsgraven east to a Y-junction from where it continues inland to Amagerbrogade while the street Ved Stadsgraven continues along the water to the Christmas Møllers Plads.

== History ==
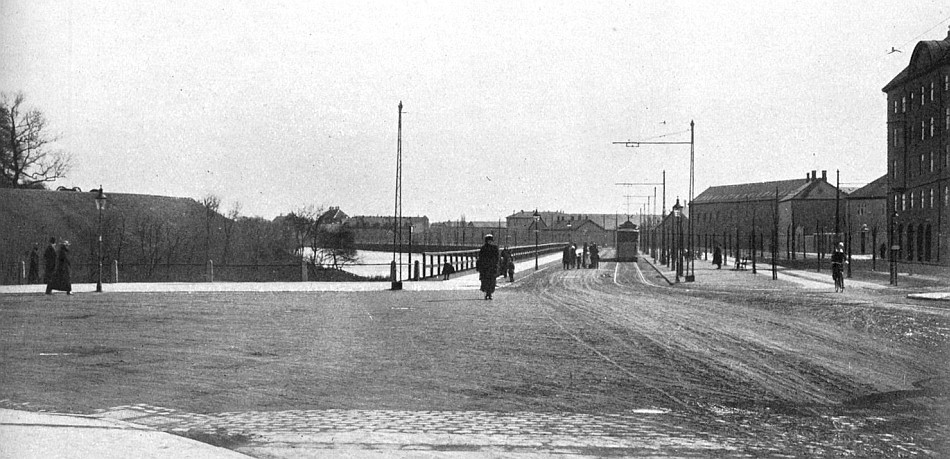
Amager Boulevard seen from Langebro in 1915

The southernmost portion of Christianshavns Enveloppe, a low rampart in front of Christianshavns Vold and Stadsgraven, was formerly located at the site where Amager Boulevard runs today. In front of it was a shallow-watered area. Amager's shoreline was then located approximately where Artillerivej runs today. In the 1880s, it was decided to build a new arsenal at the site as a replacement for Christian IV's Arsenal on Slotsholmen which had become too small. The southernmost portion of Christianshavns Enveloppe was removed and the area reclaimed and New Arsenal (Ny Tøjhus) was inaugurated in 1888. It was joined by the Army's Rifle Factory in 1991 and the Army's Technical Corps in 1909.

Amager Boulevard was constructed in 1906–07. When the new Langebro was constructed in 1954, Amager Boulevard was connected directly to it by a ramp.

== Notable buildings and residents ==
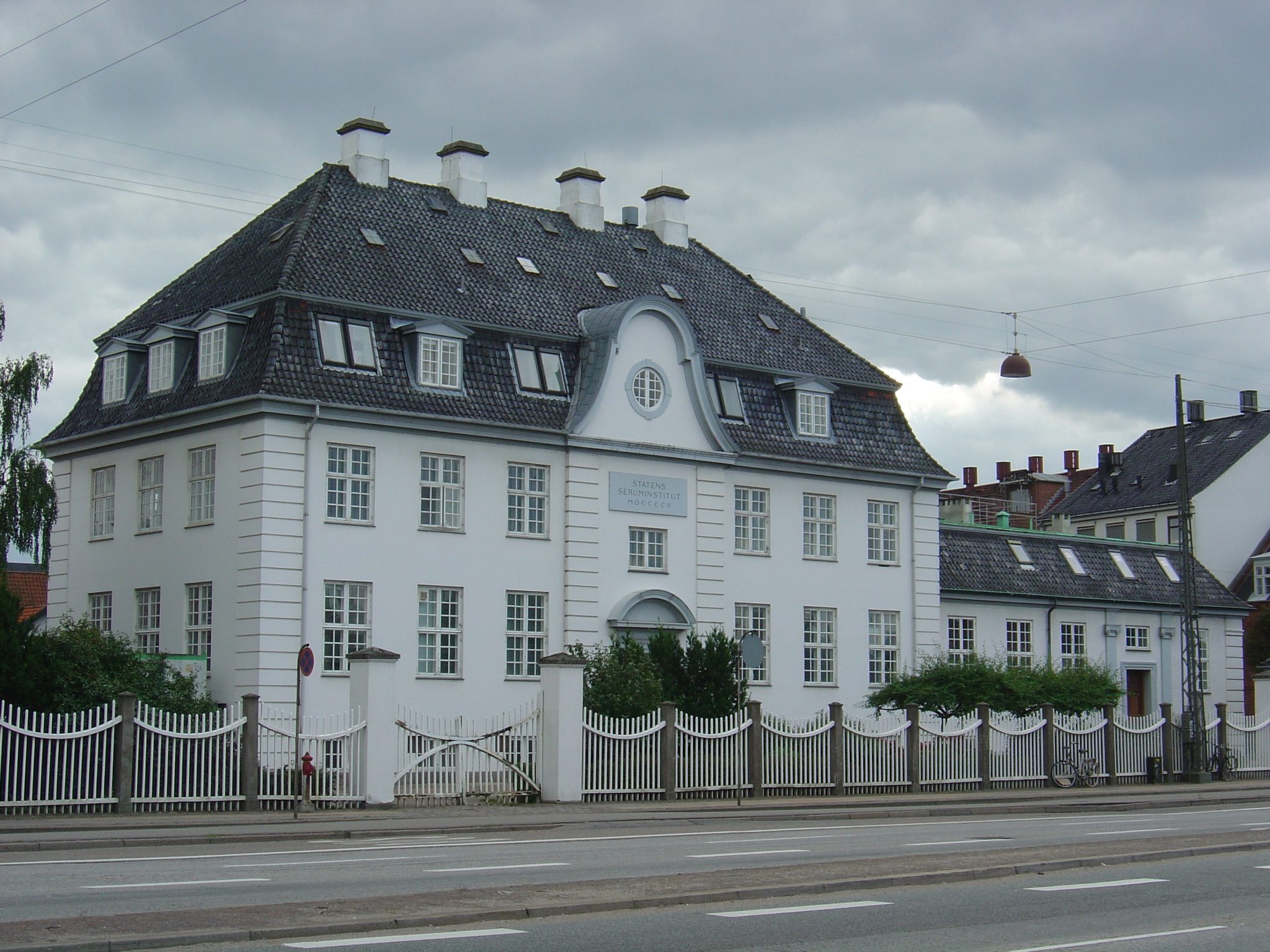
The Serum Institute's old main building

Langebrohus (No. 2) is from 1906 and was designed by Thorvald Gundestrup who also designed several other large properties that line Islands Brygge.

Then follows the headquarters of the IT company SimCorp (Weidekampsgade 16), the labour union HK (Weidekampsgade 8), KL and Deloitte which are all part of the New Arsenal redevelopment and entered from the other side of the block..

The Radisson Blu Scandinavia Hotel (No, 70) is from 1973. There are plans to extend it with 10 extra floors. Statens Serum Institut (No, 80). The oldest of its buildings is from 1902 and was designed by Andreas Clemmensen. Kvinderegensen (No. 110) is from 1932 which was originally reserved for female students. The building was designed by Helge Bojsen-Møller and the rooms were designed by Rigmor Andersen. The Norwegian House (No. 111) is a meeting place for Norwegians in Copenhagen. It is operated by the Association of Norwegians in Denmark, an organisation founded in 1863. The building is from

Mønten Kollegium No. 115 was built for the Royal Mint in 1923. The Historicist building was designed by Martin Borch. The Royal Mint moved to Vrøndby in 1975 and the building is now owned by Mikael Goldschmidt Ejendomme and has been converted into youth housing. Mp. 118, a residential building called Møllegården, is also from 1923 and was designed by Povl Baumann.
