= Composers' Quarter, Copenhagen =

Enclave of houses in Copenhagen, Denmark

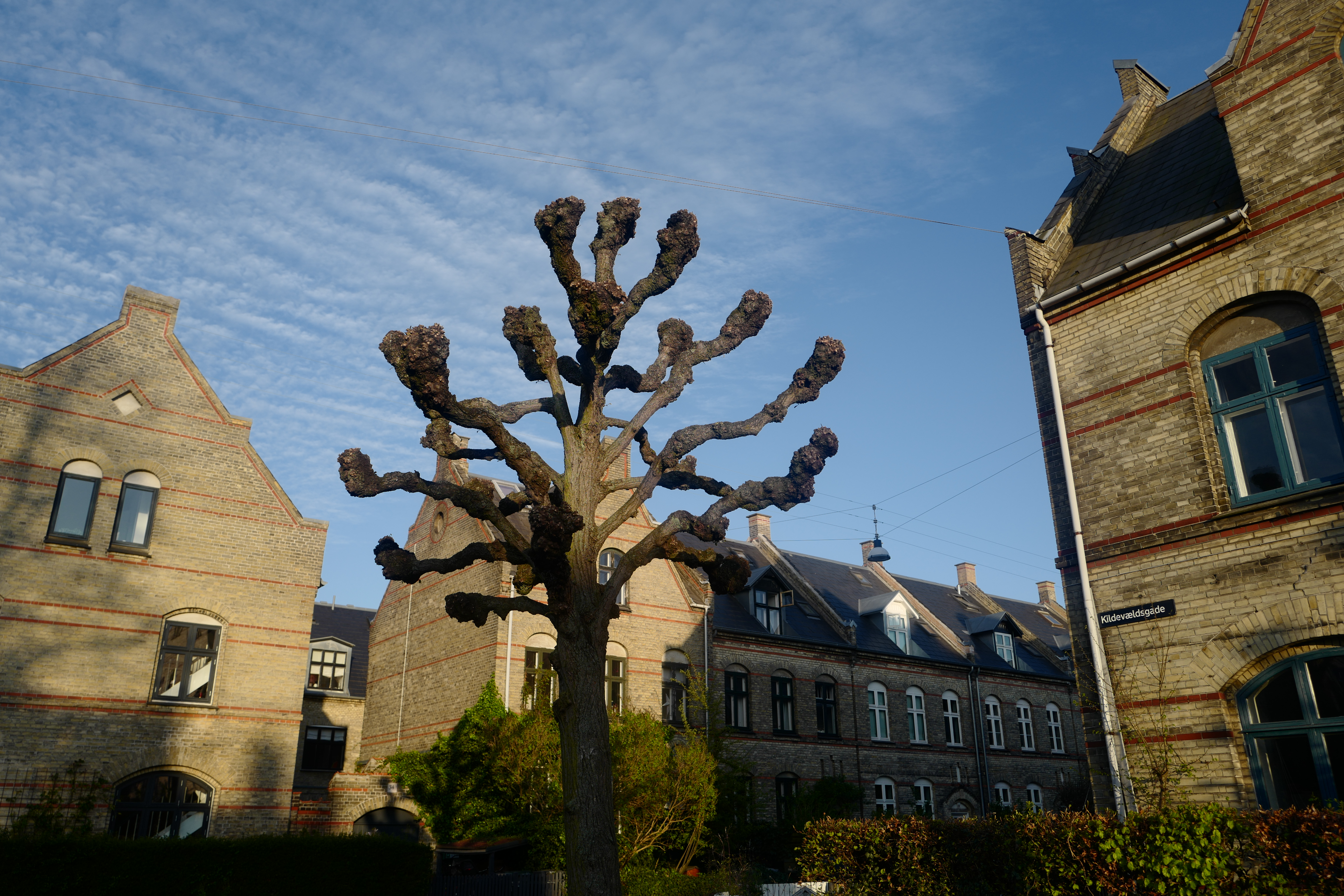
Kildeværdsgade

The Composers' Quarter (Danish: Komponistkvarteret or Komponistbyen) or Strandvej Quarter (Danish: Strandvejskvarteret), confusingly also known as the Kildevæld Quarter, or the Svanemølle Quarter (Danish: Svanemøllekvarteret), is an enclave of terraced houses located just west of Svanemøllen Station, between Østerbrogade and Kildevækd Park, in the Østerbro district of Copenhagen, Denmark. Most of the streets in the area are named after Danish or Nordic composers. The 393 townhouses were built by the Workers' Building Society (Danish: Arbejdernes Byggeforening) to provide affordable and healthy housing for working-class families, though latterly they have become very desirable middle-class homes.

== History ==
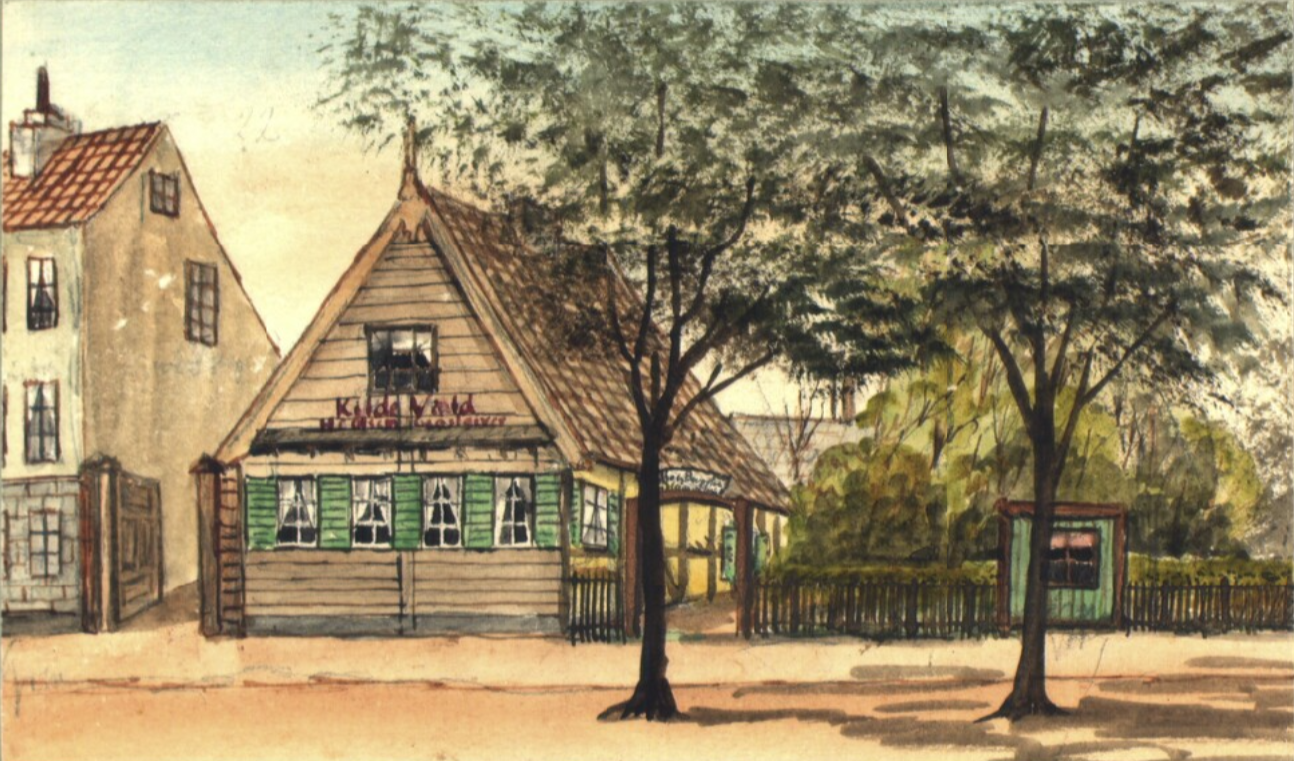
Kildevæld in 1884

The name Kildevæld Quarter refers to Kildevækrd, a country house and inn which had been located at the site since the eighteenth century. The house was located at the corner of Kildevækrdsgade and Østerbrogade. The site was acquired by Arbejdernes Byggeforening in the 1890s. The building society had already created a number of similar developments, including Kartoffelrækkerne while Humleby in Vesterbro was still under construction. The architect Frederik Bøttge was charged with designing the buildings. Construction took place between 1892 and 1903.

== Layout and street names ==
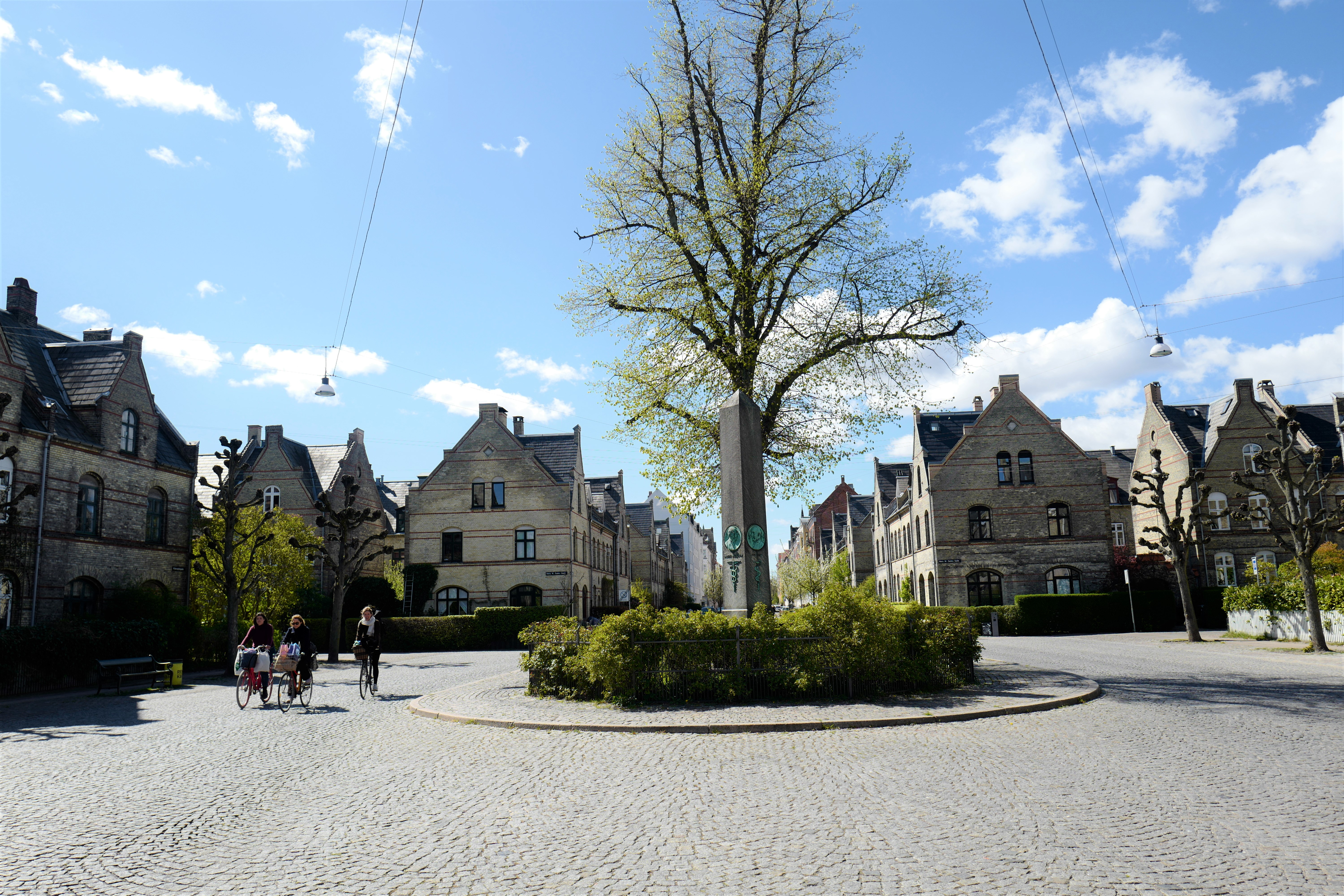
Garden with Ulrik and Melchior memorial

The Composers' Quarter is surrounded by the streets Thomas Laubs Gade, Edvard Griegs Gade, Hornemangade, Østerbrogade and Landskronagade. The houses are built in yellow brick with bands of red brick. Properties with street-facing gables are mixed with more common houses featuring dormer windows to provide variation along the long, straight streets.

The central thoroughfare of the area is Kildevældsgade, a 600 metre long street that runs from Østerbrogade in the east to Vennemindevej at Kildevæld Church in the east. After 190 metres, the street widens into a small square with a central garden complex, which features a memorial to Frederik Ferdinand Ulrik and Moses Melchior, two of the founders of Arbejdernes Byggeforening. The building society houses give way to taller apartment buildings just before Thomas Laubs Gade.

=== Street names ===
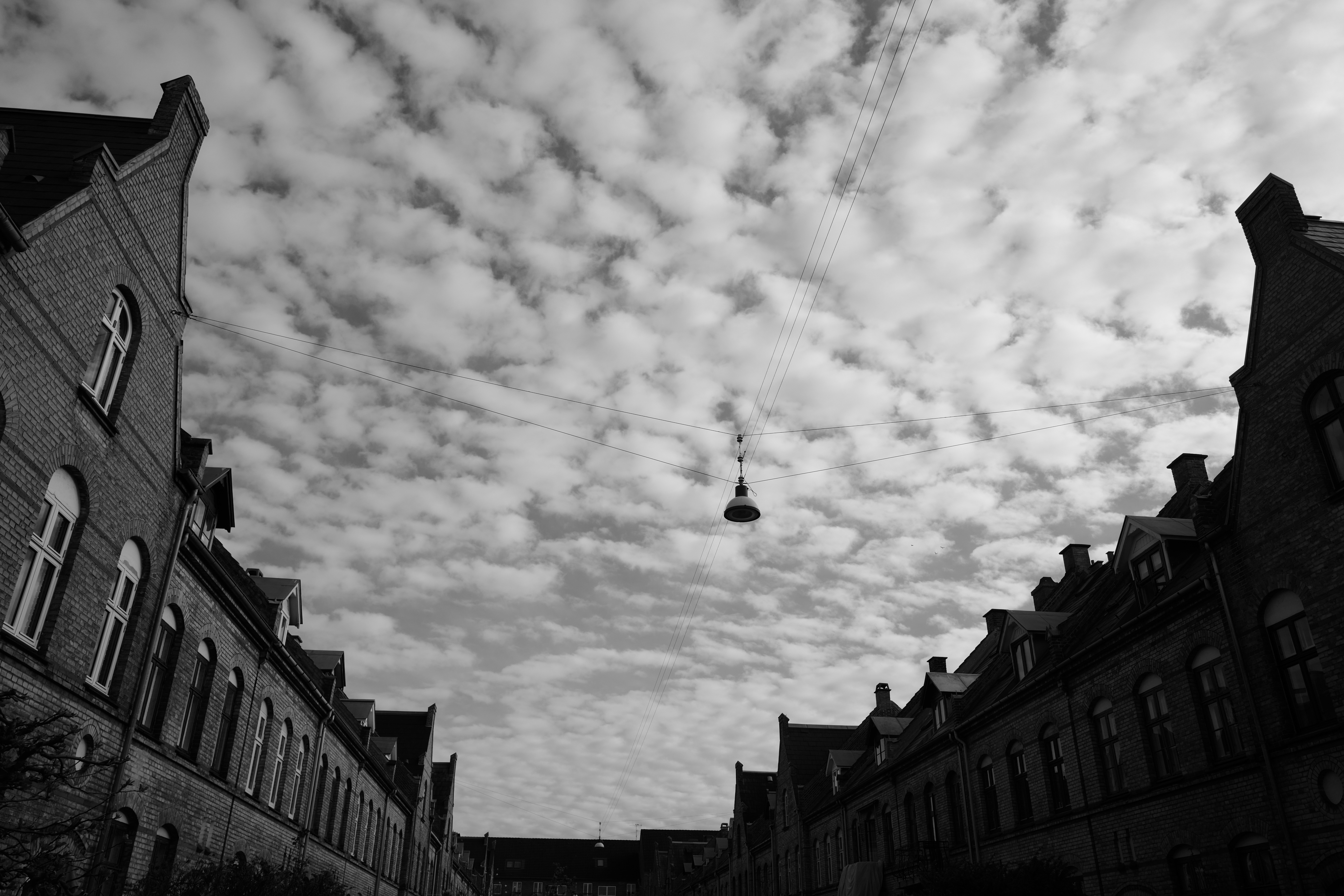
Weysesgade2

The other streets in the Composers' Quarter (apart from Kildevældsgade) are all named after Danish composers:

- Berggreensgade, named after Andreas Peter Berggreen
- Niels W Gades Gade, named after Niels Gade
- Heisesgadem named after Peter Arnold Heise
- Hornemansgade, named after Emil Horneman
- Kuhlausgade, named after Friedrich Kuhlau
- Thomas Laubs Gade, named after Thomas Laub
- H. C. Lumbyes Gade, named after Hans Christian Lumbye
- Weysesgade, named after Christoph Ernst Friedrich Weyse

A couple of neighbouring streets are also named after Nordic composers:

- Bellmansgade, named after Carl Michael Bellman
- Edvard Griegs Gade, named after Edvard Grieg
- Sibeliusgade, named after Jean Sibelius

== Notable residents ==
- Former prime minister Helle Thorning-Schmidt lived at Kuhlausgade 40 from 2004 to 2017.
