= Mønten Kollegium =

Historic dormitory in Copenhagen, Denmark

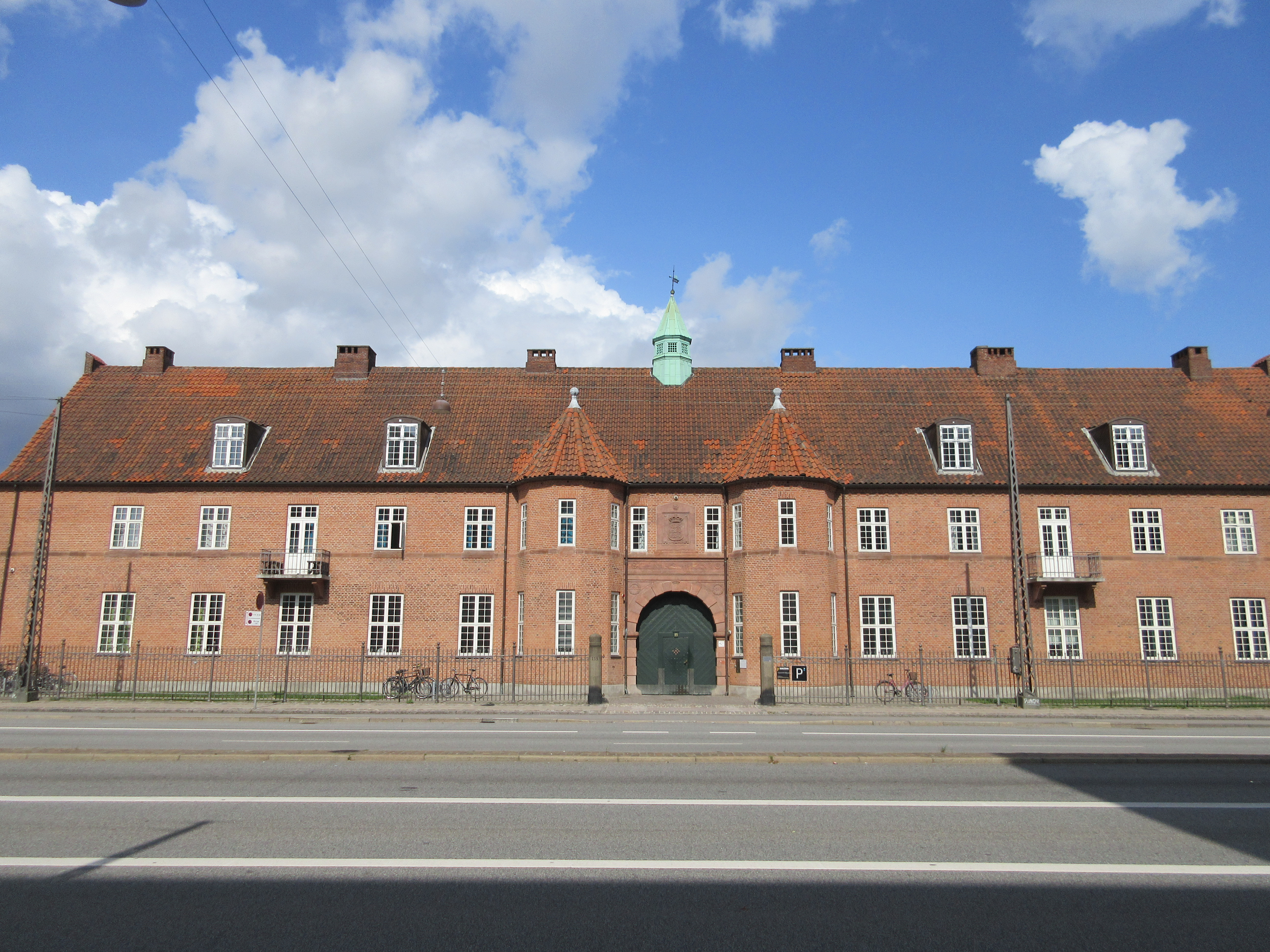
Mønten Kollegium in Copenhagen, Denmark

Mønten Kollegium is a dormitory located at Amager Boulevard 115, close to Stadsgraven, in the Amager district of Copenhagen, Denmark. The Historicist building was originally constructed for the Royal Mint in 1923.

== History ==
The Royal Mint was established by the crown in the beginning of the 16th century. It had been located at a number of different sites across the city but was from 1873 based in a building designed by Ferdinand Meldahl on Helbergsgade in Gammelholm. In the beginning of the 1920s, the building had become too small and it was therefore decided to construct a new building on Amager Boulevard. The architect Martin Borch was charged with the design of the new building which was inaugurated in 1923. The Royal Mint moved to Brøndby in 1975. In the 2010s, the building was adapted for use as student housing by Mikael Goldschmidt Ejendomme. It was later sold to Jeudan. Jeudan sold the building to DIS in 2017.

== Today ==
Mønten Kollegium contains 173 residences, varywing in size from 38 to 130 m2. All apartments have private bathroom, open kitchen and a storage room. Most apartments have a balcony. Shared facilities include a roof terrace and a laundry room.
