= Vermlandsgade =

Street in Copenhagen, Denmark

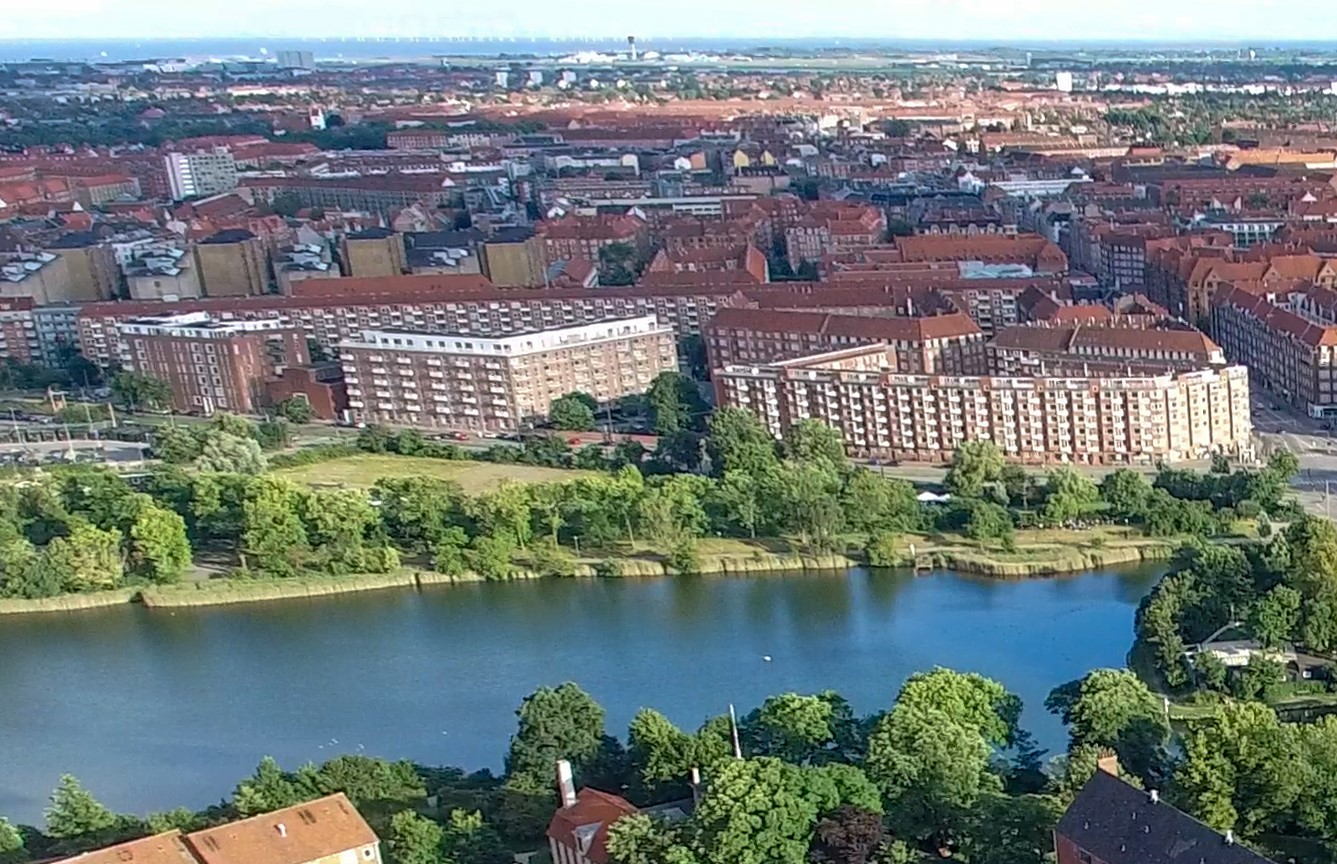
- Vermlandsgade seen from the top of the Church of Our Saviour.
- Length: 1,110 m (3,640 ft)
- Location: Copenhagen, Denmark
- Quarter: Amagerbro
- Postal code: 2300
- Nearest metro station: Amagerbro
- Northwest end: Christmas Møllers Plads
- Major junctions: Prags Boulevard
- Southeast end: Holmbladsgade

Vermlandsgade (lit. "Värmland Street") is a major street on the northeastern part of Amager, Copenhagen, Denmark. It runs from Christmas Møllers Plads in the west to a roundabout on Prags Boulevard in the east and then continues south to Holmbladsgade.

== History ==
The oldest section of the street, from Holmbladsgade to Prags Boulevard, was originally called Holmblads Boulevard. It was the first stage of a planned boulevard with upscale housing.

The area to the north of Prags Boulevard was released from the military demarcation line in 1909 and the ownership of most of the area was subsequently transferred to the city. In the early 1910s, Vermlandsgade was created as a fairly short street linking Uplandsgade in the west with Prags Boulevard in the east. It was part of a group of streets in the area that were named after historic landscapes of Sweden. The unset of World War I resulted in an upswing for industry in neutral Denmark. In 1914, the area along Vermlandsgade and Prags Boulevard was zoned for industrial activities. This brought an end to the original plans for an extension of Holmblads Boulevard. In 1925, the first short section of the unrealized Holmblads Boulevard was instead merged into Vermlandsgade.

In 1938, Vermlandsgade was extended westwards to present day Christmas Møllers Plads. This new section of the street was made extra wide to make room for a projected rail line, a side track to the Amager Line, that was never realized.

== Notable buildings ==
The Vennelyst housing estate(No. 2-), on the corner with Amagerbrogade, was built in 1938 to designs by Vilhelm Hvalsøe. With its combination of red brick and balconies, it is a typical example of Danish Functionalist architecture of the 1930s. The flour processing company Gluten's former factory, located on the corner with Uplandsgade, was one of the first industrial buildings at the street. It was built in 1918 to designs by Holger Jacobsen.

The industrial building at No. 55 is the former headquarters of AGA. In December 2019, it was announced that AGA will be moving to Ballerup and that the 17,500 square metres complex on Vermlandsgade had been sold to PFA and Tylander Group. The Danish Association of Managers and Executives (Ledernes Hovedorganisation) is based at No. 65.
