= Royal Mint (Denmark) =

Coin-manufacturing factory in Denmark

Coordinates: 55.6766°N 12.5862°E

Den Kgl. Mønt
- Company type: Government-owned company
- Industry: Coin and medal production
- Founded: 1739; 287 years ago
- Headquarters: Copenhagen, Denmark
- Area served: Kingdom of Denmark
- Owner: Danish State
- Website: www.kgl-moent.dk

The Royal Mint of Denmark (Danish: Den Kongelige Mønt) is a mint established by the Danish monarchy in the early 16th century, which currently by law is the only company allowed to mint the Danish currency (DKK). It is owned by the Danish State and administered as a subsidiary of the Danish Central Bank (Danmarks Nationalbank).

== History ==
=== Origins ===
Production of coins in Denmark goes about 1000 years back. For the first 500 years it took place at various towns around the country. The first king to start a production of coins in Copenhagen was King Hans. It is believed that it took place in the cellar of his house. Owned by Magasin du Nord, the vaulted premises still exist today at Vingårdstræde 6 where they form part of the restaurant Kong Hans Kælder.

In 1541 the Royal Mint relocated to the nearby grounds of the former St. Clare's Monastery, which had been confiscated in 1536 when Denmark officially became a Lutheran nation.

One of the streets which emerged as the city built upon the former monastery gardens was named Gammel Mønt (English: Old Mint) in memory of its occupation of the site.

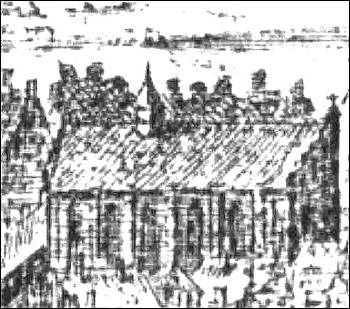
St. Clare's Priory in 1611

=== Changing locations ===
It continued in this location until 1575, when the property became used as a place of worship by a German congregation. The Royal Mint was moved to Bremerholm, the Royal Naval dockyards, most likely in the anchor forge, which was later converted into Church of Holmen. The Royal Mint returned to the former monastery in 1593. From 1614 until 1661 the production of coins mainly took place at Copenhagen Castle, although other sites were also in use as mints during this period. A new currency, the Danish rigsdaler, was introduced in 1625.

=== At Borgergade ===
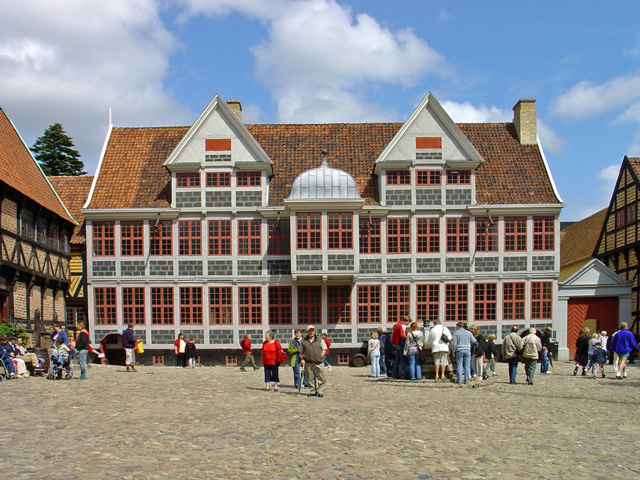
The Mint Master's House in Aarhus

Gotfred Krüger, who was the king's mint master from 1664 to 1680, acquired a property in Borgergade in 1671 while the production of coins took place in a neighbouring building. This lasted until 1749 when it was sold. The Mint Master's House was dismantled in 1943 and put into storage. It has now been rebuilt in the Old Town open-air museum in Aarhus.

It was at Borgergade that the practice began of printing a heart on Danish coins. It is unclear whether this symbol originally signified the mint master family or the locality but since the initials CW for Winekes are often found next to it on coins from the time, the latter is assumed to be the case.

=== At Gammelholm ===
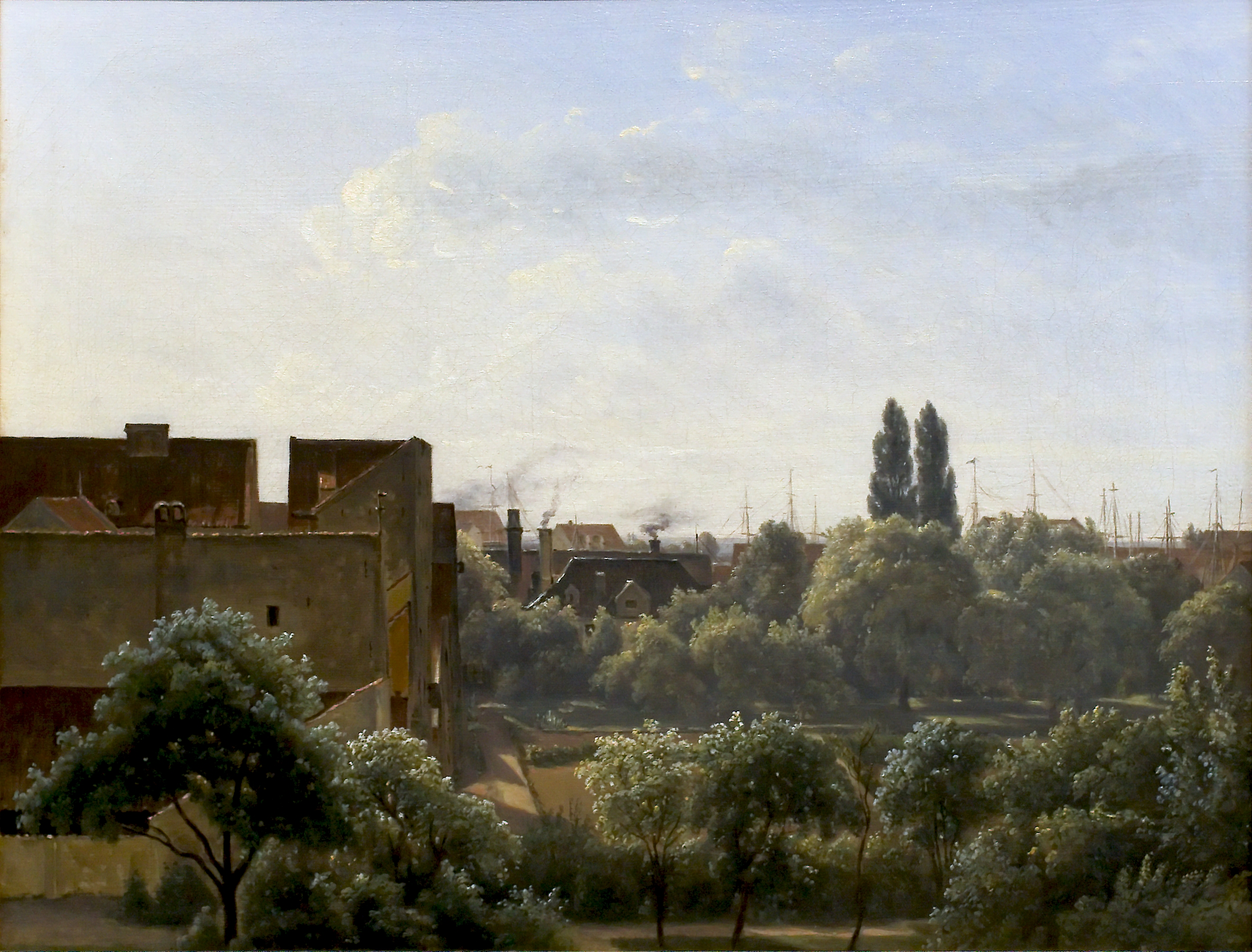
The Royal Mint and the Botanical Garden painted by Vilhelm Kyhn from a window in Charlottenborg in 1862

In 1749, at Nyhavn, a new Mint was established in the royal mews to the rear of Charlottenborg Palace. The buildings, which were located where Holbersgade crosses the Nyhavn Bridge, was demolished in the early 1870s to make way for the establishment of the new street when the entire Gammelholm area was redeveloped.

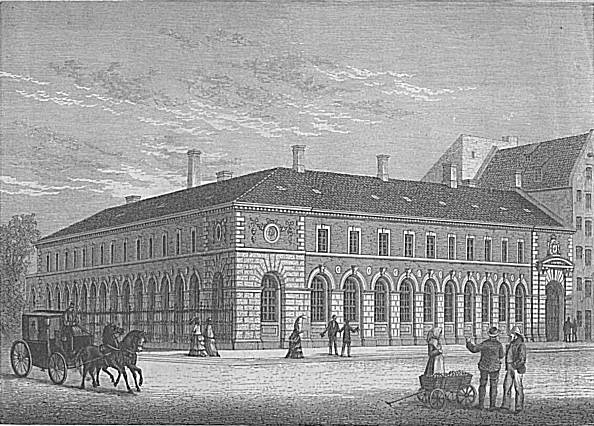
The Royal Mint in Holbergsgade, illustration from Illustreret Tidende

A new building for the Mint was completed on the corner of Holbergsgade and Herluf Trolles Gade in 1873. The building, which still exist today, was designed by Ferdinand Meldahl, who was also resonnsible for the overall planning of the neighbourhood, in collaboration with City Architect Ludvig Fenger.

Special coins were from 1894 made by the company Fritz Meyer in Gothersgade (No. 14) for use in Angmagssalik on Greenland.

=== On Amager ===
In 1923 the Royal Mint moved once again when a new facility was inaugurated at Amager Boulevard 115 on Amager to designs by Martin Borch. The building is today owned by M. Goldschmidt Holding and has been converted into youth housing (150 units) and commercial space (23 offices).

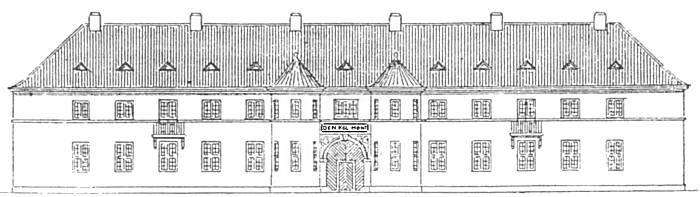
Martin Borch's rendering for the Royal Mint at Amager Boulevard

=== Post-1975 ===
In 1975 the Danish government placed the Royal Mint under the control of the Danish Central Bank, and in 1978 the mint moved to a location on Solmarksvej in Brøndby. In March 2012 the offices of the mint were again relocated to Copenhagen, to the Danish Central Bank building on Havnegade.

== Current denominations ==
The krone, which is divided into 100 øre, has been the unit of currency in Denmark since 1875. Coins denominated in values of 1, 2, 5, 10, and 25 øre were previously minted in Denmark, but they have been withdrawn. Now, the coin with the lowest denomination in circulation is the 50 øre coin. The rest of the circulating coins have denominations of 1, 2, 5, 10 and 20 krone. The Royal Mint of Denmark has also minted commemorative coins in gold in silver.

== Current operations ==
In October 2014, the Danish Central Bank announced that it would cease to produce its own coins and banknotes in 2016, citing a continuing decline in demand for new currency and a predicted total saving of DKK 100 million over the years until 2020 by outsourcing production to external suppliers. The decision did not affect the bank's position as the issuing authority of Danish currency or its role in designing coins and banknotes.

The bank issued an invitation to tender for the production of coinage in December 2015, and announced in May 2016 that a bid by the Mint of Finland had been selected as "most advantageous" on the grounds of cost, security, and quality. Production started in 2017, with an initial contract term of four years. This was renewed for another four years in 2020, extending the term until May 2025.
