= Christmas Møllers Plads =

Road junction in Copenhagen, Denmark

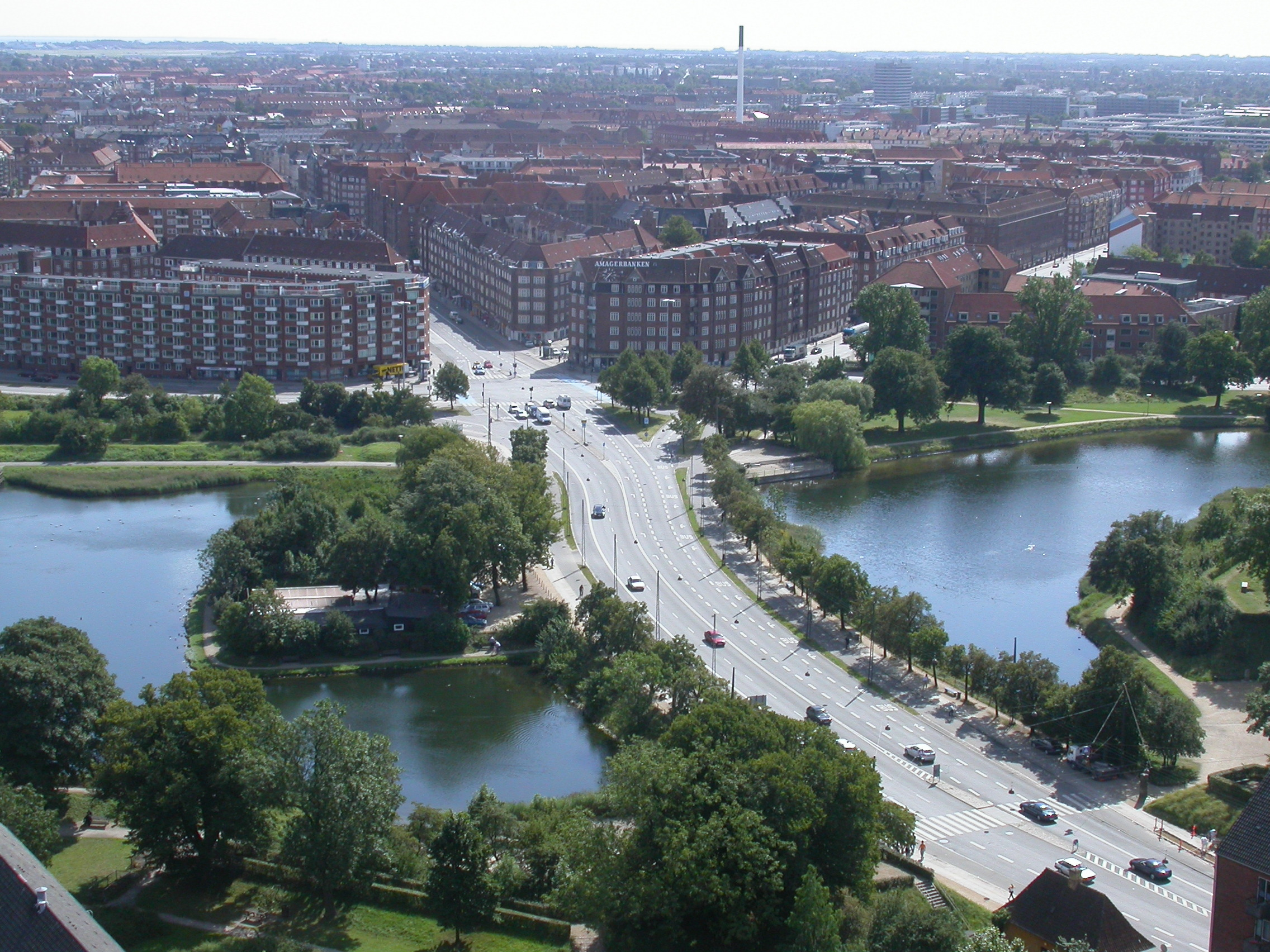
- Christmas Møllers Plads seen from the top of the Church of Our Saviour.
- Location: Copenhagen, Denmark
- Quarter: Amagerbro
- Postal code: 2300
- Nearest metro station: Christianshavn
- Coordinates: 55°40′7.3″N 12°35′46.3″E

Christmas Møllers Plads is a major junction located in front of the embankment to Christianshavn on northern Amager in Copenhagen, Denmark. It links Torvegade, the main thoroughfare of Christianshavn, with Vermlandsgade, Amagerbrogade, Amagerfælledvej and Ved Stadsgraven-Amager Boulevard. Its name commemorates the Conservative politician Christmas Møller who had been active in the resistance movement during World War II and later served as Minister of Foreign Affairs.

== History ==
Christmas Møllers Plads is located outside Copenhagen's former Amager Gate. Amager Fælledvej was connected to the Amagerbrogade in the 1900s. At this point, the site was still surrounded by open countryside. Being located inside the so-called demarcation line which enforced building restrictions outside the city's fortification, it was only allowed to build wooden structures. The fortifications had been removed on the other side of the harbour but Christianshavns Vold was still military area and the demarcation line was still in force. One of the few buildings at the site was Røde Mølle (Red Mill). In 1909, all building restrictions were finally abolished. The area between Amagerbrogade and Amagerfælledvej from 1912. Vermlandsgade was created in 1923. The street Ved Stadsgraven was constructed in the 1930s, linking the site with Amager Boulevard.

A roundabout, supposedly the largest in the country, was built at the site in 1942. The roundabout was bisected by tramway tracks. The roundabout was removed and replaced by new traffic lanes and street lights when the last trams disappeared in 1971. The junction was named Christmas Møllers Plads was introduced in 1950 to commemorate the Conservative politician Christmas Møller who had been active in the resistance movement during World War II and later served as Minister of Foreign Affairs.

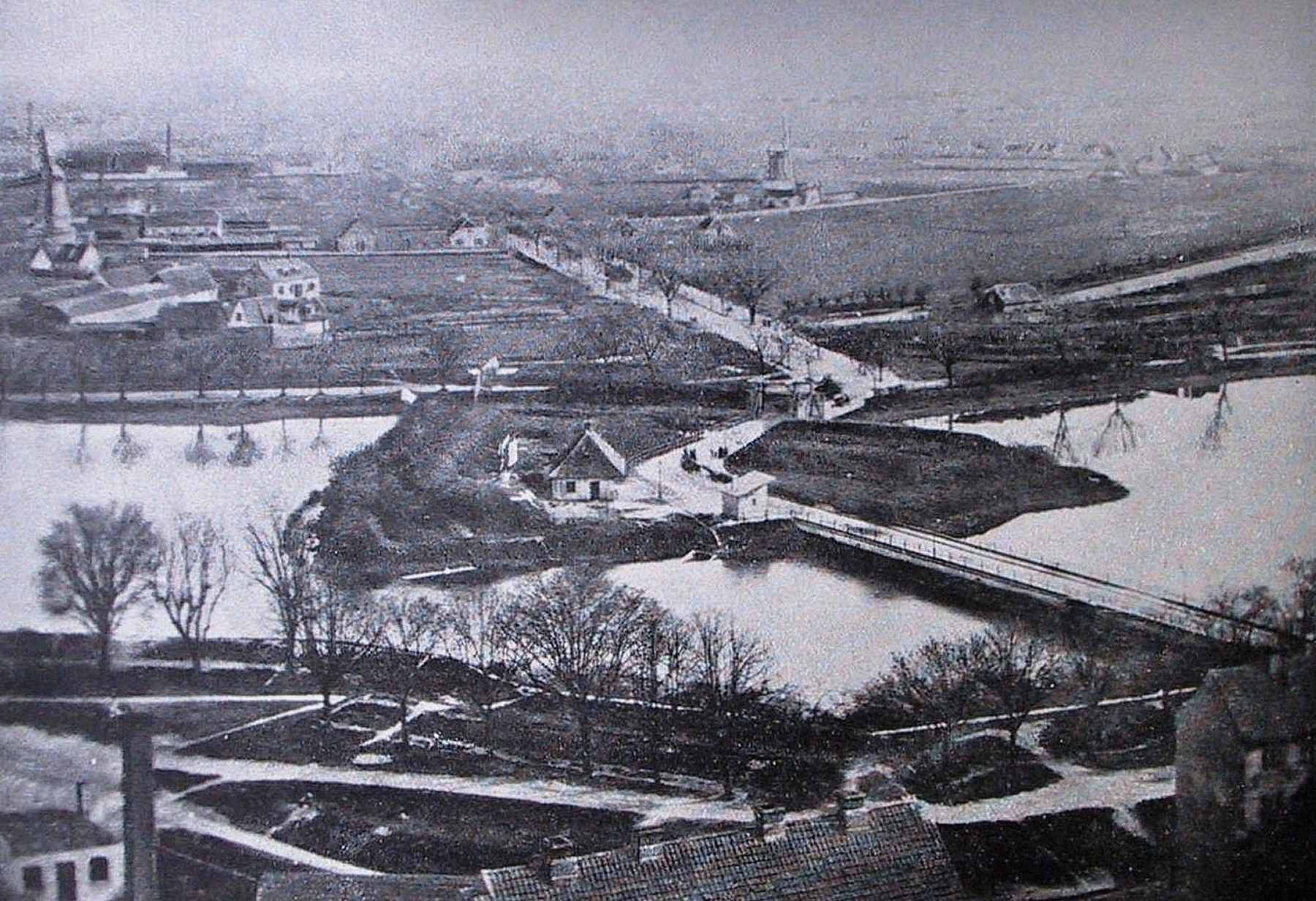
The site in 1865 with Røde Mølle as one of the only buildings

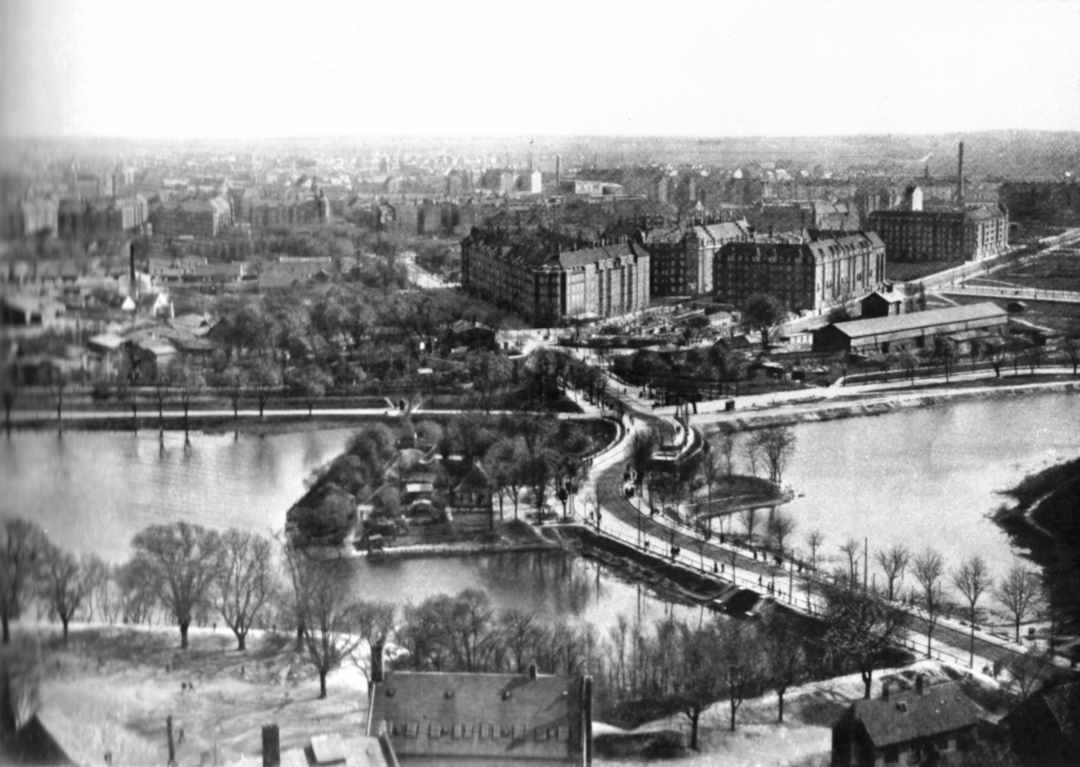
1915: The first building has been built between Amagerbrogade and Amagerfælledvej

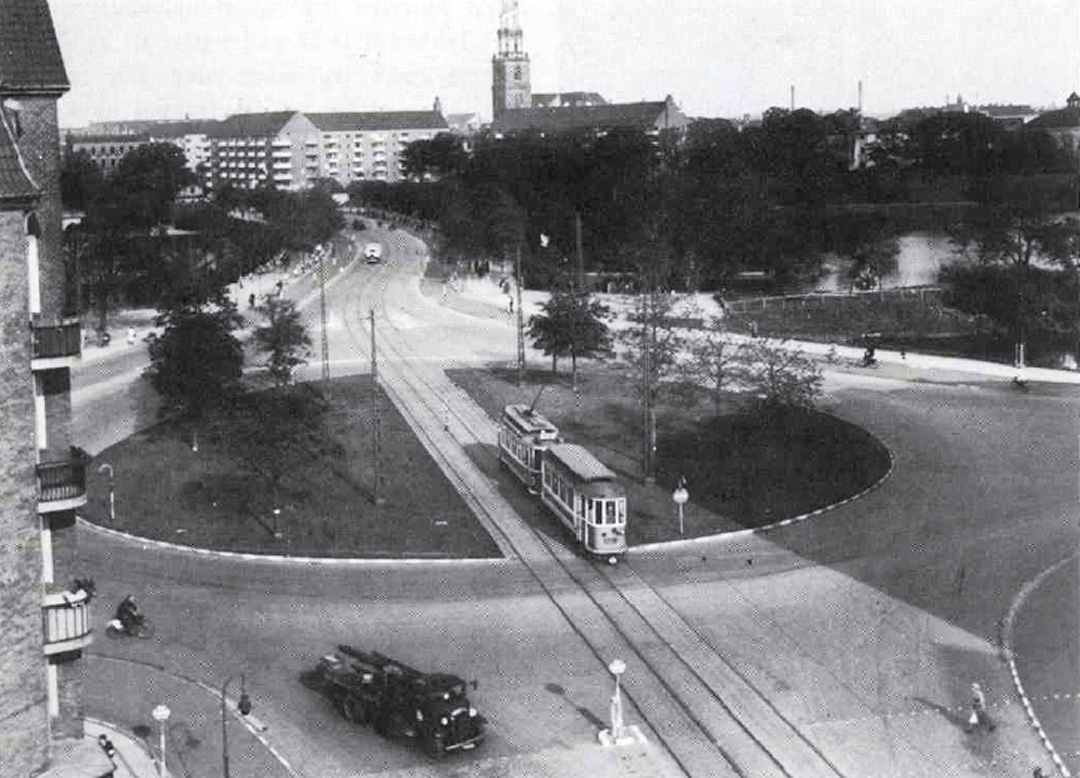
The roundabout shortly after it was built in 1932

== Cultural references ==
The former roundabout is seen at 1:16:29 in the 1969 Olsen-banden film The Olsen Gang in a Fix when a Skoda Oktavia is involved in a pile-up.

== See also ==
- Christianshavns Enveloppe
