= Humleby =

Enclave of terraced houses in Copenhagen, Denmark

Coordinates: 55°40′06″N 12°32′18″E

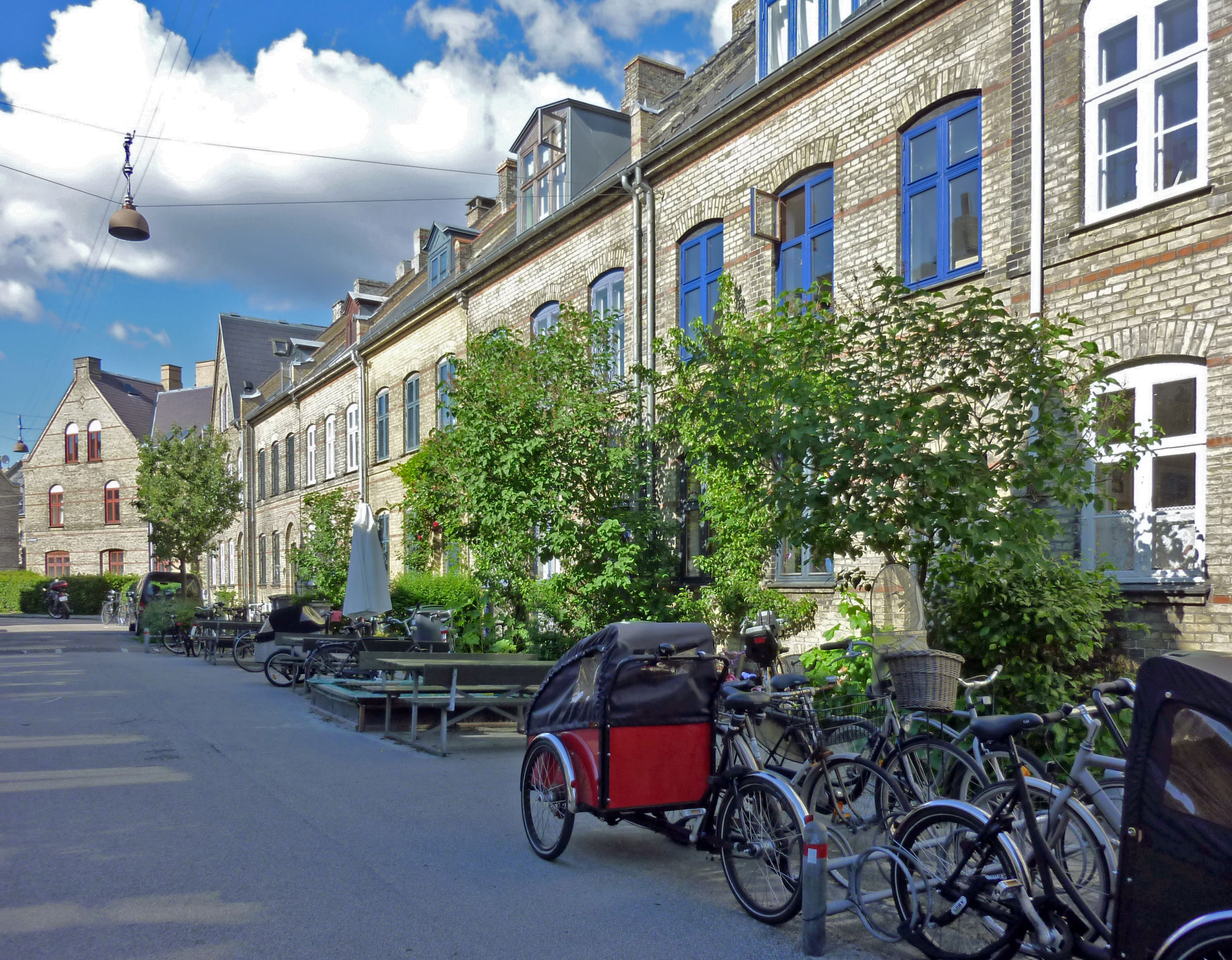
Jerichausgade, a side street to Ny Carlsberg Vej

Humleby (lit. 'Hops Town') is an enclave of terraced houses situated next to the Carlsberg area in the Vesterbro district of Copenhagen, Denmark. They were built between 1885 and 1891 by the Worker's Building Society to provide healthy housing for the workers at Burmeister & Wain.

The area consists of 235 three storey houses. They were designed by Frederik Bøttger, the architect of the Building Society, who was inspired by English working-class housing.

== Streets ==
- Vesterfælledvej
- Ny Carlsberg Vej* Freundsgade - named after the sculptor Hermann Ernst Freund (1786-1840)
- Jerichausgade - named after the sculptor Jens Adolf Jerichau (1816-1883)
- Bissensgade - named after Herman Wilhelm Bissen (1798-1868)
- Ernst Meyers Gade - named after the painter Ernst Meyer (1797-1861)
- Lundbyesgade - named after the painter Johan Thomas Lundbye (1818-1848)
- Küchlersgade - named after the painter Albert Küchler (1803-1886)
- Carstensgade - named after the painter Asmus Jacob Carstens (1754-1798)

== See also ==
- Kildevækd Quarter
