= Association of Norwegians in Denmark =

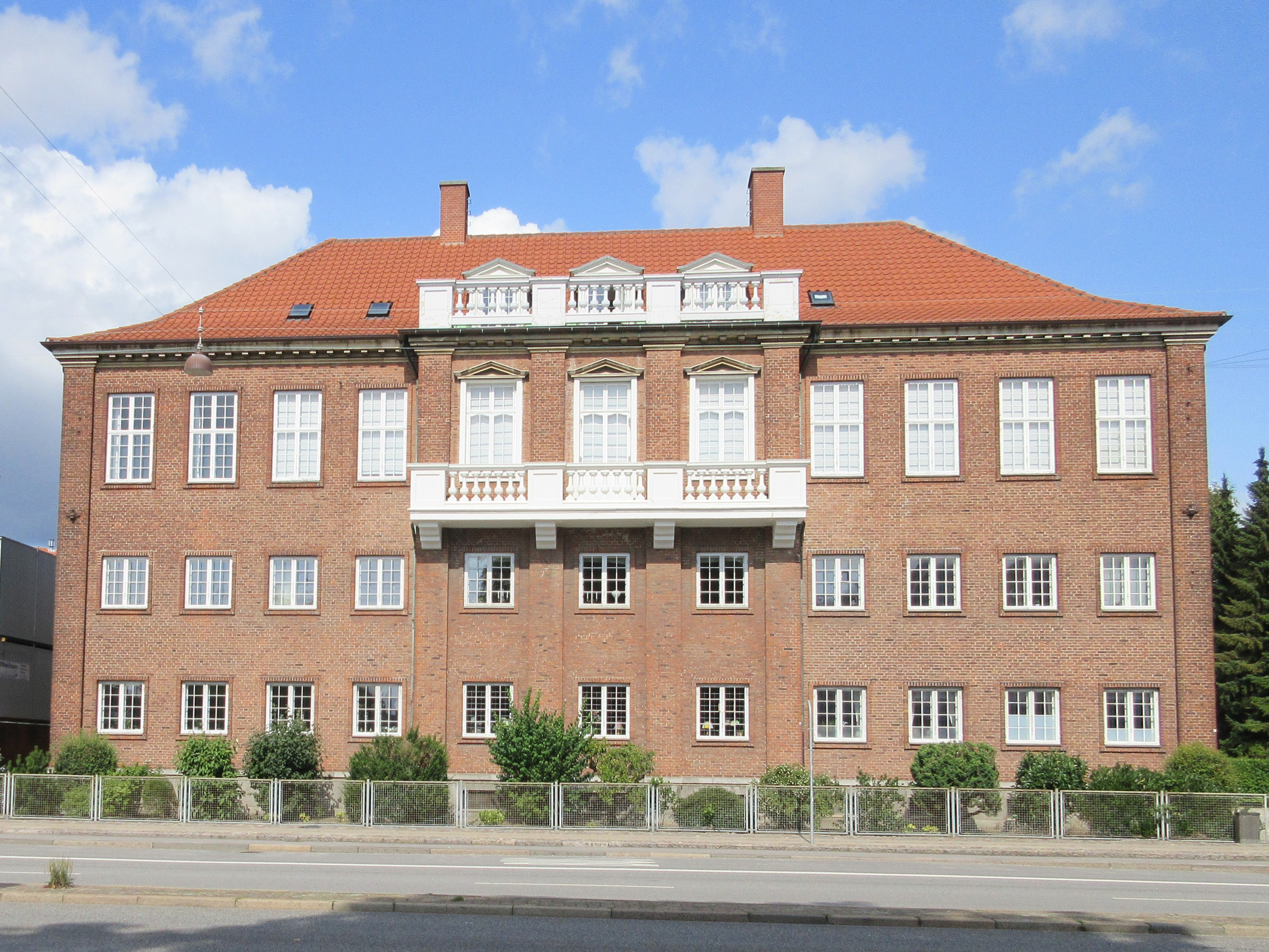
The Norwegian House on Amager Boulevard in Copenhagen

The Association of Norwegians in Denmark (Danish and Norwegian: Den Norske Forening) is an association for Norwegians in Denmark. It was founded in 1963 and is headquartered in the Norwegian House at Amager Boulevard 111 in Copenhagen.

== See also ==
- Norwegian Society
- Schæffergården
