= St. Clare's Priory, Copenhagen =

Coordinates: 55.682°N 12.580°E

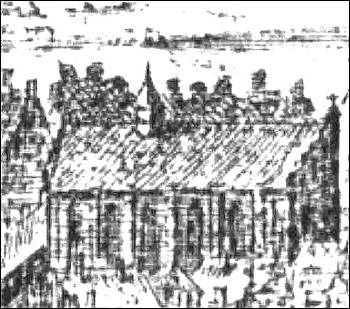
St. Clare's Priory seen in an engraving by Johan van Wick from 1611

St. Clare's Priory in Copenhagen, Denmark, was a short-lived community of nuns of the Order of Poor Clares, which lasted from 1497 to 1536. The monastic buildings then came into use as a mint, which after its decommissioning became known as the Old Mint, giving rise to the present day street name Gammel Mønt at the site.

== History ==
The Poor Clares first arrived in Denmark in 1249. An important monastery was established at Roskilde, the capital of Denmark at the time.

In 1497 King John I and Queen Christina founded the monastery in Copenhagen with a gift of the former royal vegetable gardens, located in the north part of the city near the city wall, in an area known as Rosengård after an earlier estate. In 1498 the Queen made a donation of 40 Rhenish Guilders for construction of the monastery. It was completed and consecrated on 11 August 1505, the Feast day of St. Clare, with great ceremony. The monastery consisted of a dormitory, refectory, church, infirmary, cellars and places for lay sisters and a priest to stay.

== Dissolution ==
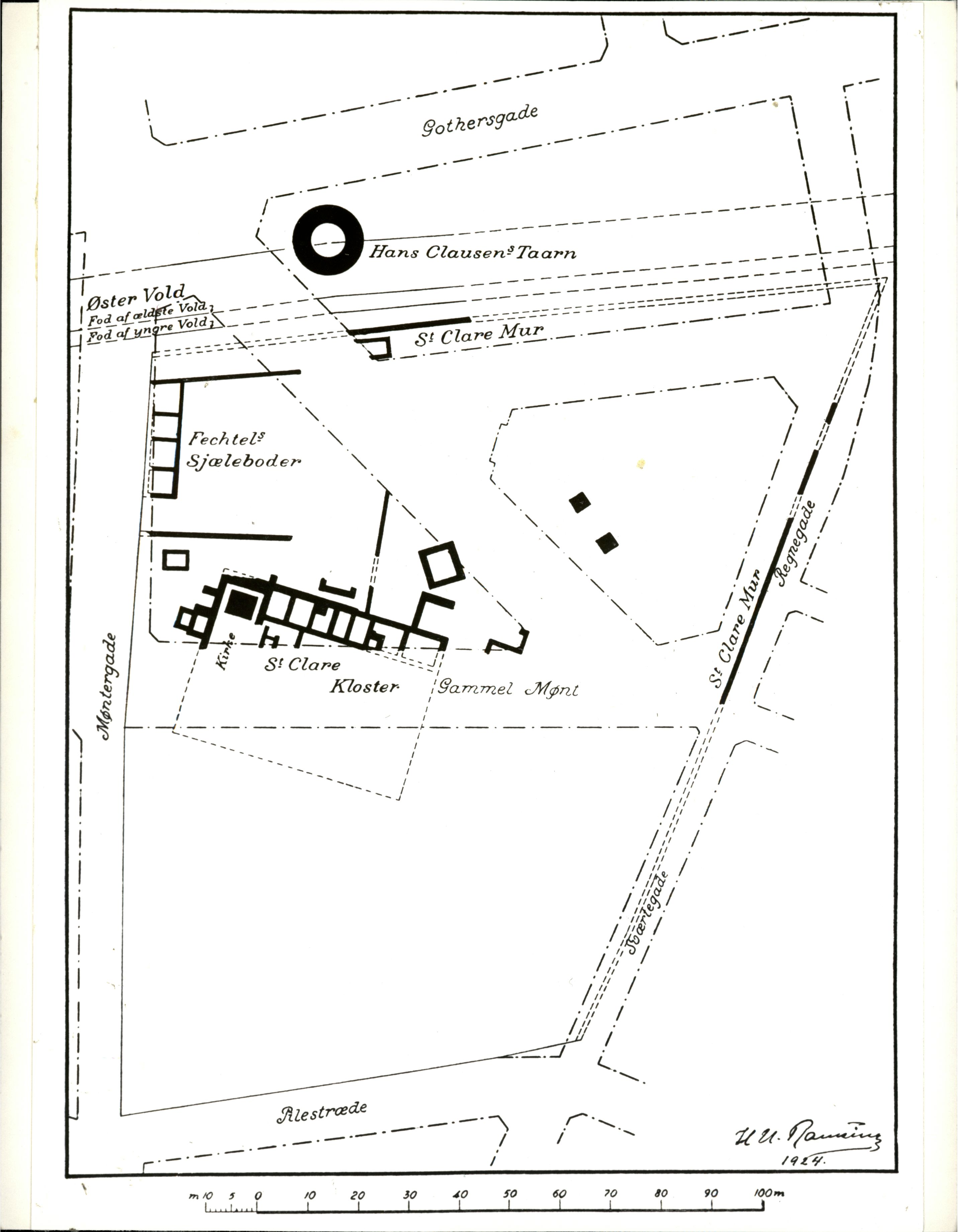
A plan of the priory created by H.U. Ramsing in 1924.

The monastery prospered in the early years, but as the Protestant Reformation gained influence, the daily search for food and alms for the poor began to dry up. Many Danes felt that the mendicant orders, nicknamed the 'beggar monks and nuns' were an additional burden over and above the regular tithes and fees paid to sustain the church. In 1527 a priest formerly assigned to the monastery wrote to King Christian II, describing a chest which the abbess of the monastery had given him to distribute to the Poor Clares in Odense, who were suffering dire poverty. The abbess had asked him to convey the money in secret because she was afraid if the amount became known the Order would be held up to scorn and ridicule. He encouraged Christian II to return to Denmark to take in hand the care of the Poor Clares who had been his mother's 'particular and elect' daughters.

The city fathers passed a law that forbade the nuns or their agents from collecting food or alms on the street which quickly impoverished the monastery. By January 1532 conditions had grown so bad that the 'nursing sisters' and the 'provisioner sisters' had abandoned the monastery. The Franciscan friars had been expelled from their friary, leaving the nuns with virtually no way to sustain themselves spiritually or temporally.

A few of the friars were permitted to gather alms for the Poor Clares, but they could not solicit alms any closer than 40 miles from the city. The transport of large quantities of food back to Copenhagen proved to be so difficult that they attempted to sell the provisions for money. The Grayfriars were by that time generally hated, and few would purchase anything from them. On 25 May 1535 the Minister General of the Franciscan Order wrote to the abbess, informing her that either they would have to abandon the monastery, or they would have to violate their Rule and accept cash money for their sustenance.

Denmark officially became Lutheran in October 1536 with the adoption of the Smalcald Articles. All Catholic church property and buildings became Crown property. The monastery was closed and the nuns either went to other locations or left the Order.

Much of the monastery was converted into shops and residences for the poor. The largest building began to be used as the Royal Mint in 1541. Several city fires, the worst in 1728, destroyed the complex and no remnants exist of the monastery today.

== Sources ==
- Nielsen, Dr. Oluf, 1877: Kjøbenhavn i Middelalderen. Copenhagen: G. E. C. Gads Forlag; text available online at Kjøbenhavn i Middelalderen (kap. XVI: Klostre og Hospitaler) (in Danish)
