= St. Andrew's Church, Copenhagen =

St. Andrew's Church
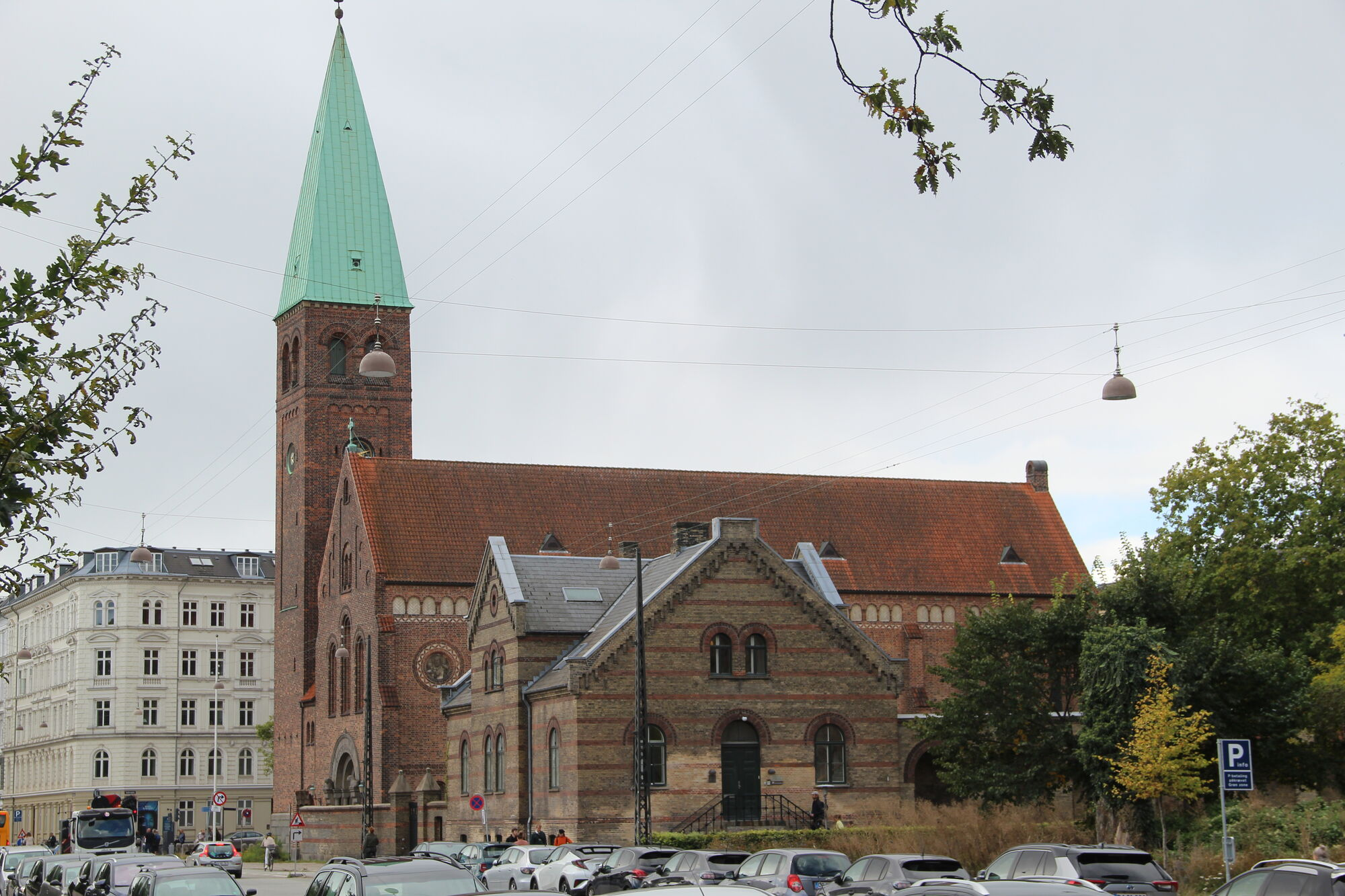
- St. Andrew's Church
- St. Andrew's Church
- 55°41′9.7″N 12°34′8″E
- Location: 148 Gothersgade; Copenhagen
- Country: Denmark
- Denomination: Church of Denmark

History
- Status: Church

Architecture
- Architect: Martin Borch
- Architectural type: Church
- Style: Romanesque Revival
- Groundbreaking: 1898
- Completed: 1901

Specifications
- Materials: Brick

Administration
- Diocese: Diocese of Copenhagen

St. Andrew's Church (Danish: Sankt Andreas Kirke) is a Lutheran church on Gothersgade in Copenhagen, Denmark, which was designed by the architect Martin Borch and built from 1897 to 1901. It is a parish church within the Danish National Church.

== Architecture ==
St. Andrew's is a two nave church oriented with the choir to the west and the main entrance to the east. The tower is located at the south-east corner of the building. Its style is mainly inspired by Danish brick architecture of the late Romanesque period. The portal is inspired by Jutland granite portals, with three pairs af columns and corbels shaped as lions. The latter were designed by Anders Bundgaard, known as the creator of the Gefion Fountain at Langelinie, while Thomas Bærentsen designed a number of reliefs including a circular relief of St. Andrew on the north wall of the nave. The lateral nave on the south side has three pointed gables.
