= Rigmor Andersen =

Danish designer, educator and author

- Born: December 11, 1903; Aarhus, Denmark
- Died: March 10, 1995 (aged 91); Søllerød, Denmark
- Education: Royal Danish Academy of Fine Arts
- Occupations: Designer, educator, and author
- Years active: 1929 — 1980
- Parent: Hans Emil Andersen
- Projects: Designed the National Bank's wedding gift for Queen Margrethe II and Prince Henrik

Rigmor Andersen (11 December 1903 – 10 March 1995) was a Danish designer, educator and author. Above all she is remembered for maintaining the traditions of Kaare Klint's furniture school at the Royal Danish Academy of Fine Arts.

== Early life ==
The daughter of journalist Hans Emil Andersen, Rigmor Andersen was born in Aarhus, Jutland. After matriculating from Rysensteen Gymnasium in 1922 and a one-year drawing course at the technical school, she was admitted to the Royal Danish Academy of Fine Arts where she studied under Kaare Klint at his newly founded Furniture School. She was impressed by his analytical teaching method and his interest in functional solutions. Towards the end of her studies, she worked for the designer Poul Henningsen (1927–29), contributing to designs which culminated in his classical PH Lamps.

== Career ==
From 1929 to 1939, Andersen worked in Klint's studio, becoming one of his most trusted colleagues. Thanks to her competent, self-assured approach, she was soon an indispensable contributor to many of the studio's projects. In 1931, she was assigned her first independent task, designing furniture for Kvinderegensen, a women's student residence on Amager Boulevard in Copenhagen. The building's architect, Helge Bojsen-Møller, was reluctant to allow a young lady to handle the assignment but Andersen, appreciating the nature of the task, created a series of simple, almost timeless pieces of furniture and carefully developed plans for the different rooms: the assembly hall, the library and 56 bedrooms. The furniture for the communal rooms was in mahogany with leather upholstery, that for the students' rooms in beech. The bedrooms were fitted out with a bed, desk, bookcase, two chairs (one with arms) and a stool. The assignment led to her collaborating with several furniture makers, as she produced items which were frequently exhibited at the Cabinetmakers Guild's annual fairs. Among her exhibits were a bedroom in elm and mahogany as well as chairs, desks and some 50 semicircular tables with flaps in African mahogany. In 1966, she was responsible for designing the graphics room at Maribo Museum and, in 1980, she exhibited a bureau at Den Permanente, a design exhibition for craftsmen and producers.

Her work also includes an elegantly shaped, beautifully detailed silverware cabinet from 1936 which was exhibited at the Swedish National Museum in Stockholm in 1942. In 1948, a copy was made for the Danish Design Museum in Copenhagen. Her work was also exhibited at home and abroad: at the Danish Art Treasures presentation in London (1948), at Charlottenborg Spring Exhibition in Copenhagen (1968), and at Malmö Museum in Sweden (1971).

== Collaborative work ==
In addition to her design work, in 1948 Andersen entered a competition with sculptor Inge Finsen for memorials for resistance workers and for the accidental bombing of the French School. The same year the two completed a remembrance wall at Copenhagen's Domus Medica for physicians who lost their lives in the fight for freedom during the World War II.

In 1962, she collaborated with the designer Annelise Bjørner, creating an elegant bed with an unusual seating feature. Together they also designed a woman's bedroom in Oregon pine and mahogany and entered various furniture and silverware competitions. In 1967, they designed cutlery, including an elegant storage cabinet, as the National Bank's wedding gift for Queen Margrethe II and Prince Henrik. It was later marketed as Margrethebestikket (Margrethe Cutlery). They also designed furniture for both domestic and foreign manufacturers. In 1968, Annelise Bjørner and Rigmor Andersen were together awarded the Eckersberg Medal for the Margrethe Pattern.

== Teaching ==
For almost 30 years, from 1944 to 1973, Andersen taught at the Royal Academy's Furniture School where she did her utmost to maintain Klint's traditions and approach. She enthusiastically collected and catalogued materials and sketches, gave talks and, in 1979, published her well-prepared work: Kaare Klint møbler (Kaare Klint Furniture).

== See also ==
- Danish modern
- Danish design

== Literature ==
- Andersen, Rigmor: Kaare Klint møbler, 1979, Copenhagen, Kunstakademiet, 93 p.
