= Arbejdernes Byggeforening =

Arbejdernes Byggeforening (lit. "The Workers' Building Society") was a Danish building society founded in Copenhagen in 1865 to provide healthy homes for the city's workers, especially those from the Burmeister & Wain factory. At the time of its foundation, the society had just 200 members but it grew fast, reaching 16,000 in 1890, and peaking at 26,342 members in 1955.

The society built a total of almost 1,500 terraced houses at various sites around the city, including Kartoffelrækkerne in Østerbro and Humleby in Vesterbro, before it was dissolved in 1972.

== History ==
=== Background ===
The idea of providing good and healthy homes for the poorest part of the city's workforce originated among local politicians and medical doctors during the 1853 Copenhagen cholera outbreak which killed approximately 5,000 citizens. A major reason for the outbreak was the dismal conditions in the poorest parts of the city which suffered from overpopulation and lack of proper sanitary facilities.

The Danish Medical Society was the first to take action with the construction of Brumleby, built between 1853 and 1872.

=== Foundation ===
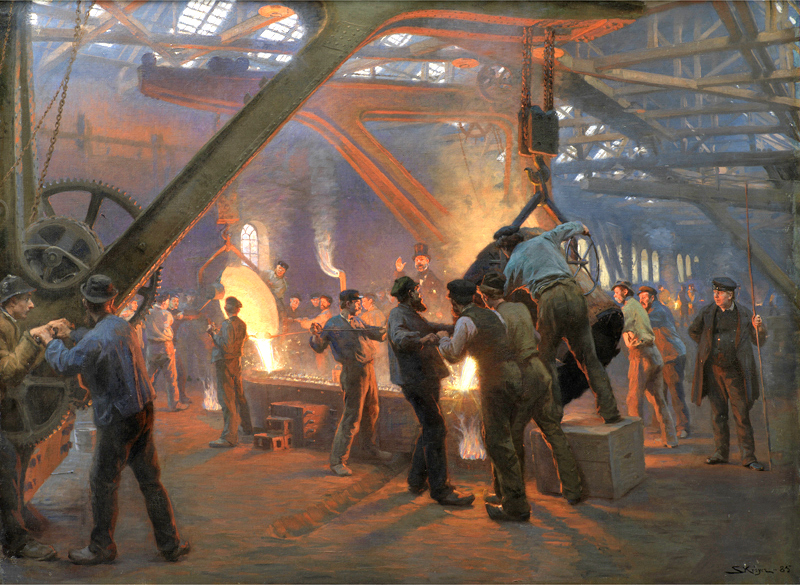
Burmeister & Wain's iron foundry in 1885 as painted by Peder Severin Krøyer

The Worker's Building Society was founded in 1865 on the initiative of the medical doctors Emil Hornemann (1810–90) and Frederik Ferdinand Ulrik (1818–1917) who had witnessed first hand how far conditions could deteriorate, but it also drew on possible reforms in health care and housing.

Ulrik had his clinic at Christianshavn and arranged some meetings for the workers at the nearby Burmeister & Wain plant, one of the largest work places in the city, and it was with them that the new building society was founded on 20 November 1865, with foundry worker N. B. Hallin as its first chairman and Ulrik as its deputy chairman.

=== Developments ===
The first terraces were built on Amager from 1867 to 1871. They were designed by Henrik Steffens Sibbern who also planned the next developments, 12 houses at Gammel Kongevej (1868–69) and 45 houses at Nyboder (1870–72).

The third development, 45 houses at Nyboder built from 1870 to 1872, was designed by Frederik Bøttger and from 1874 he became the society's new resident architect, a position he held until 1903. During this 30-year period, the society built up the areas which are now known as Kartoffelrækkerne, Humleby and Strandvejskvarteret.

Bøttger was succeeded by Christen Larsen and it was to his design that the society built its last two developments, the so-called Lyngbyvejskvarteret with 324 houses, from 1906 to 1929, and another 105 houses on Amager between 1930 and 1938.

=== Late years ===
Gradually the price of land and the costs of construction became too high, making the houses inaffordable for ordinary workers. It was said that "...the Worker's Building Society was not for workers but for people of means" which undermined the original philosophy behind it. In 1972 it was dissolved.

== Scheme ==
The Building Society members paid 35 øre a week. When they had saved up DKK 20, they could participate in the annual drawing for a house. After 10 years of repayments, they received the deed to the house, and after 24 years were the homeowners. For those who did not receive a house, the society worked as a savings bank. After a number of years they could withdraw their savings.

== Architecture ==
Frederik Bøttger's houses are built in yellow brick with slate roofs.

Christen Larsen's houses, in red brick and with red tile roofs, are built to an asymmetric National Romantic design. Considerably younger, they also demonstrate the general improvements in housing standards, with more practical floor plans and fittings, such as built-in China cabinets.

== See also ==
- List of banks in Denmark
