= Kartoffelrækkerne =

Neighborhood in Copenhagen, Denmark

Coordinates: 55°41′31″N 12°34′31″E

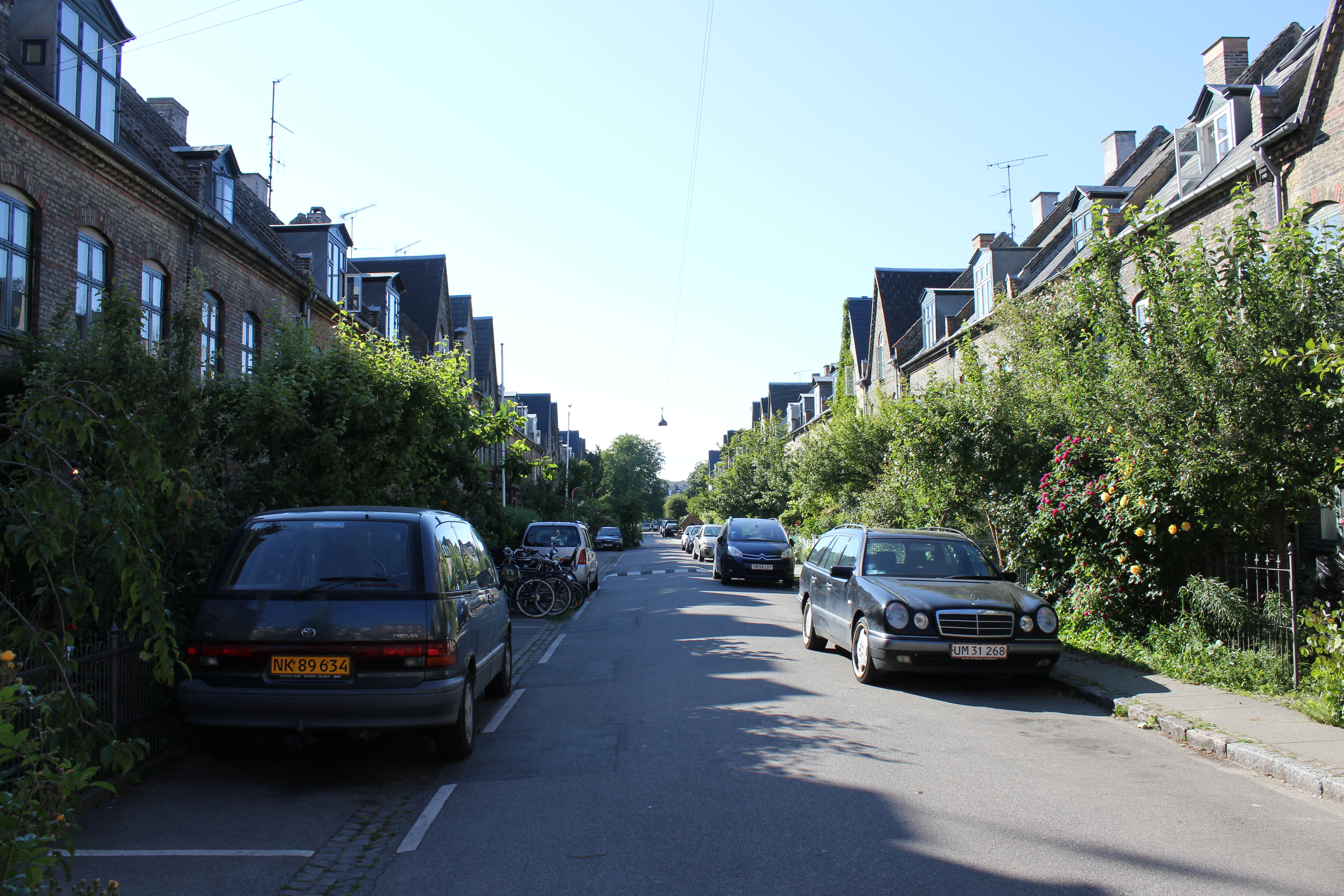
A street in Kartoffelrækkerne

Kartoffelrækkerne (lit. 'Potato Rows') is a housing project built 1873–1889 in what is today the eastern border of central Copenhagen, Denmark. It consists of 480 houses built by a now defunct shipyard (Burmeister & Wain) workers' union to avoid the unhealthy sanitary conditions of central Copenhagen of the day and the resulting cholera epidemic. The plans included sewers and garbage disposal solutions as prescribed by the then new understandings of the causes of the epidemics. The architect of the project was Frederik Christian Bøttger who used yellow brick with horizontal red brick lines to create a classic impression. The area was previously part of the fortifications surrounding the city where no construction had been allowed; instead potatoes were grown there in long rows. The houses were built in 11 straight lines; both factors contributed to the name of the project.

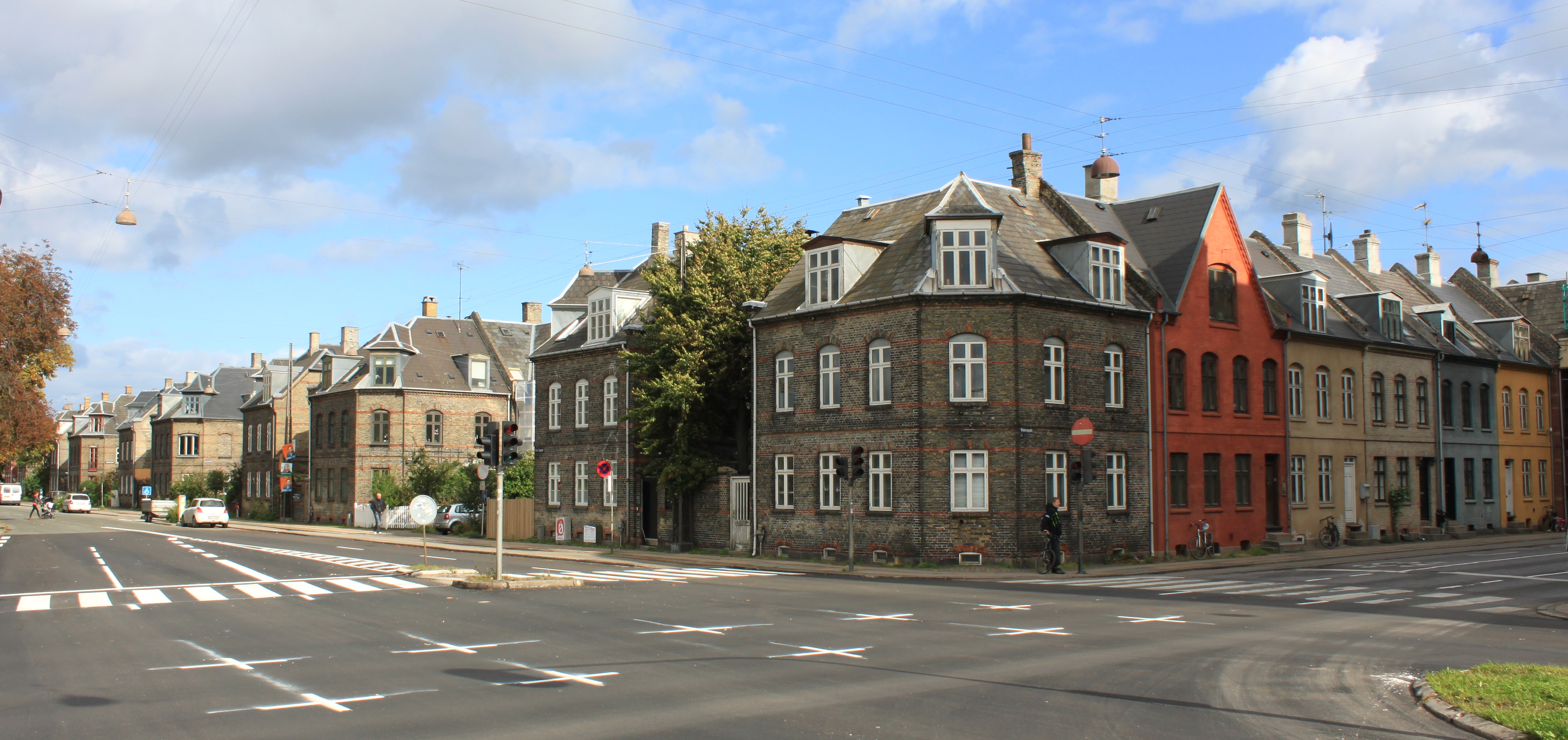
Kartoffelrækkerne as seen from Fredensbro

To finance the project, workers of the shipyard could pay a small advance, but the actual distribution of the houses was done by lottery. The advance money was returned with interest to the unlucky families after a 10 year period. The ones that did win would pay the rest off over 10–25 years, although the houses were typically shared by two or three families because of the high cost. Today most of the houses are single family homes in what has become a very attractive and central address. Ironically, at the time of construction there was much opposition to its location so far from the city and the perceived long commute.
