= Martin Borch =

Danish architect

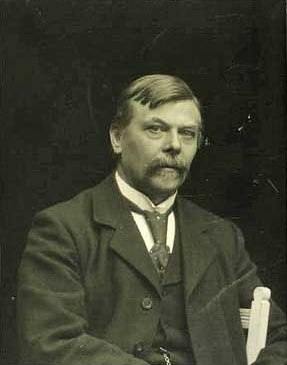
- Portrait of Martin Borch
- Born: 1 March 1852; Skerngård, Denmark
- Died: 8 February 1937 (aged 84); Skovshoved, Denmark
- Occupation: architect

Signature
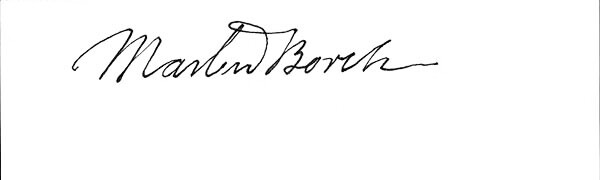

Martin Borch (1 March 1852 – 8 February 1937) was a Danish architect.

== Early life and education ==
Borch was born at Skerngaard near Skjern, Denmark. He was the son of Frederik Borch (1807–1868) and Johanne Frederikke Borch née Frausing (1809–1886). He attended Randers Latin School from 1863 to 1866 and C.V. Nielsen's drawing school from 1868 to 1869. From 1869 to 1877, he attended the Royal Danish Academy of Fine Arts.

== Career ==
From 1886 to 1916, Borch was a permanent architect for the Danish sugar manufacturing company, De Danske Spritfabrikker. As a royal building inspector, he received many commissions for the University of Copenhagen and Danmarks Nationalbank. From 1893 to 1899, he was an assistant at the Royal Danish Academy of Fine Arts, School of Architecture.

He received the Eckersberg Medal twice: in 1894 and in 1901. Borch was a knight of the Order of the Dannebrog and received the King's Medal of Merit.

== Personal life ==
He was married in 1880 to Marie Henriette Nyrop (1853–1943), a daughter of af vicar Christopher N. (1805–79) and Helene Ahlmann (1807–74), Her brother was the architect Martin Nyrop. Martin Borch died in Copenhagen and was buried at Hørsholm Cemetery.

== Works ==
- Gisselfeldhusene
- Expansion of the Den Kongelige Veterinær- og Landbohøjskole, Bülowsvej, Frederiksberg, Copenhagen
- Landsarkivet i Århus (1887)
- Provincial Archives of Funen (1893)
- Gårdbogård in Ålbæk (1893)
- Skoven Kirke (1897)
- Brattingsborg manor, Samsø (1898)
- New facade for the organ in Køge Kirke (ca. 1900)
- St. Andrew's Church, Copenhagen (1901)
- The garden wing for Østre Landsret (1902)
- Snubbekorset (1903)
- Magasinbygningen at Københavns Universitet (1905–1907)
- Ungdomshjem in Aarup (Aaruphallen's present building) (1908)
- Arcade at Regensen on Købmagergade opposite Rundetårn (1908)
- Rigshospitalet on Tagensvej (1910)
- Royal Mint, Amager Boulevard 155, Copenhagen (1923)
- The student dormitory Studentergården in Copenhagen (1923).

== See also ==
- List of Danish architects
