= List of bridges in Copenhagen =

== Main Harbour ==
Image	Name	Type	Date opened	Connecting	Streets	Ref
	Bryggebroen	Bicycle bridge	2007	Havneholmen, Islands Brygge		
	Inderhavnsbroen	Bicycle Bridge	2016	Nyhavn, Christianshavn		
	Knippelsbro	Road bridge	1937	Slotsholmen, Christianshavn	Børsgade, Torvegade	
	Langebro	Road bridge	1949	Kalvebod Brygge, Amager West	H. C. Andersens Boulevard Amager Boulevard	
	Lille Langebro	Bicycle bridge	2019	Christians Brygge, Christianshavn	Vester Voldgade Langebrogade	

== Zealand Side ==
Image	Name	Type	Date opened	Crossing	Coordinates	Ref
	Børsbroen	Road bridge		Slotsholmen Canal		
	Christian IV's Bro	Road bridge		Slotsholmen Canal		
	Cykelslangen	Bicycle bridge	2014	Havneholmen's canal		
	Dronning Louises Bro	Road bridge	1949	The Lakes		
	Fredensbro	Road bridge	1949	The Lakes		
	Gefionbroen	Pedestrian bridge	1949	Kastellet's moat		
	Holmens Bro	Road bridge	1949	Slotsholmen Canal		
	Højbro	Road bridge	1949	Slotsholmen Canal		
	Kastelsbroen	Road bridge	1949	Kastellet's moat		
	Marmorbroen	Road bridge	1949	Frederiksholms Kanal		
	Nyhavn Bridge	Road bridge	1912	Nyhavn		
	Prinsens Bro	Road bridge	1949	Frederiksholms Kanal		
	Stormbroen	Road bridge	1949	Frederiksholms Kanal		
	Teglværksbroen	Road bridge	1949	Teglværkshavnen		

== Amager ==
Image	Name	Type	Date opened	Crossing	Connecting	Streets	Ref
	Cirkelbroen	Bicycle bridge	2015	Christianshavns Kanal	Christianshavn, Applebys Plads (Islands Brygge)		
	Dyssebroen	Bicycle bridge	1998	Stadsgraven	Christianshavn, Amager		
	Snorrebroen	Road bridge	1924	Christianshavns Kanal	Christianshavn (east and west	Sankt Annæ Gade	
	Proviantbroen	Bicycle bridge	2014				
	Trangravsbroen	Bicycle bridge	2014	Trangraven and Christianshavns Kanal	Christianshavn, Holmen		
	Wilders Bro	Road bridge		Wilders Kanal	Christianshavn (east and west	Strandgade	

== See also ==
- Template:Bridges in Copenhagen
