= Agnete and the Merman =

Underwater statue by Suste Bonnén

Coordinates: 55°40′39″N 12°34′49″E

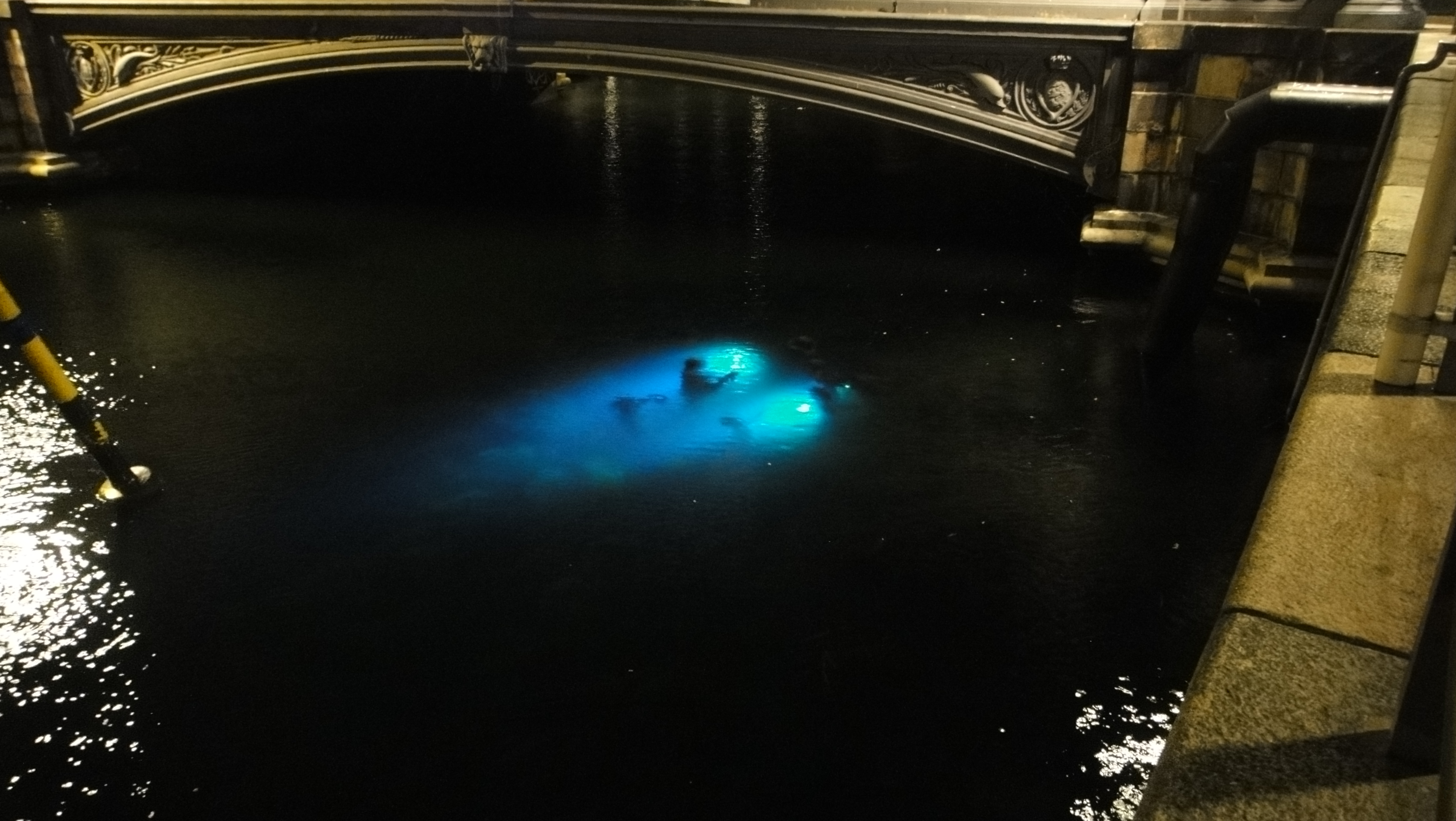
The bronze sculptures of the Merman and his sons as seen from the canal.

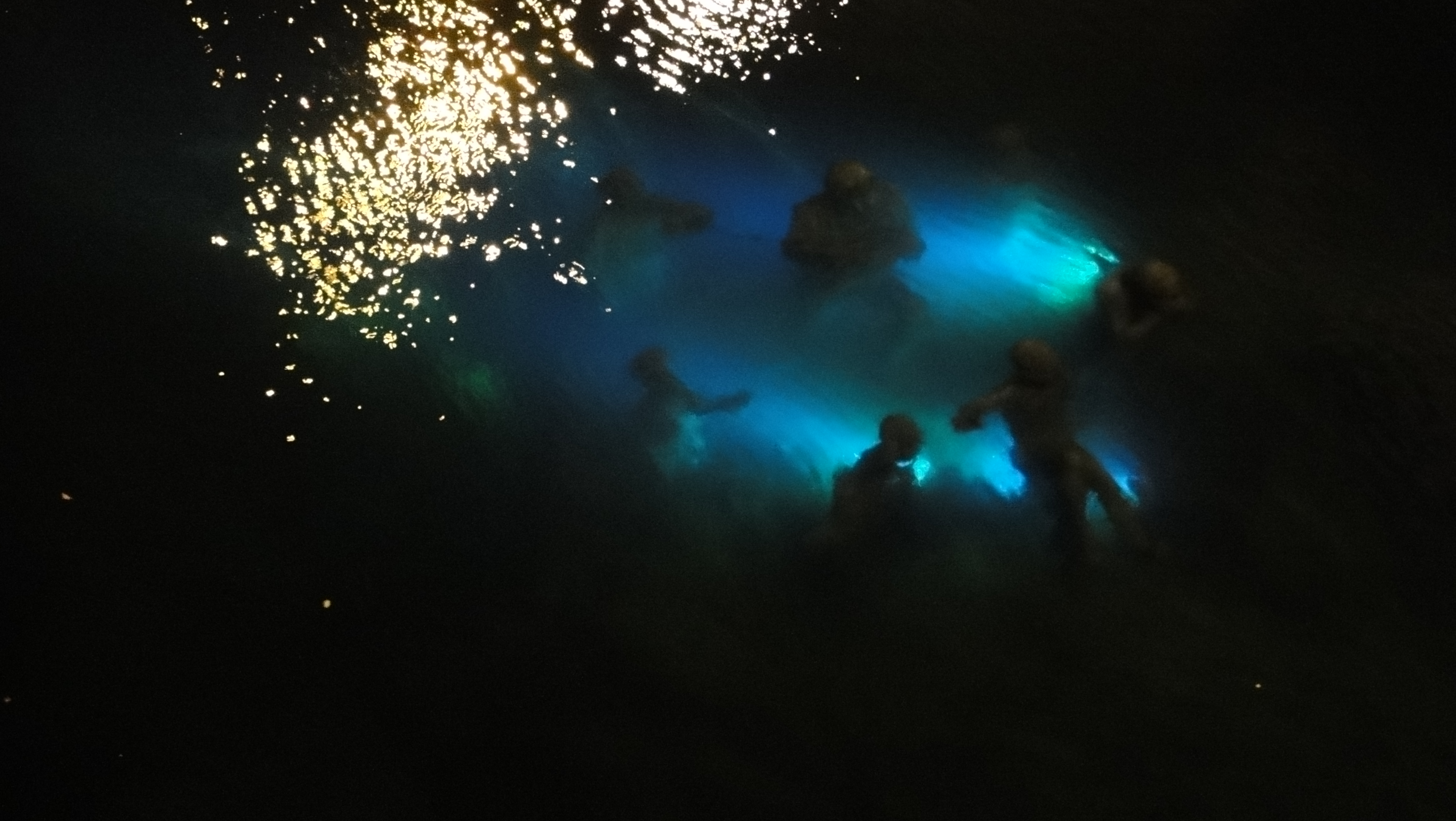
A closer look at the sculptures

Agnete and the Merman is a group of bronze sculptures in Copenhagen, Denmark, located underwater in the Slotsholm Canal next to the Højbro Bridge. It has been referred to as one of the least-known works of art in Copenhagen. The sculptures were made in 1992 by the Danish sculptor, photographer, and author, Suste Bonnén. They portray a merman and his seven sons with outstretched arms, begging Agnete to return home. Three other sculptures of merfolk are located in Copenhagen: the "Black Diamond Mermaid", a copy of Anne Marie Carl-Nielsen’s 1921 statue; a large (15-foot) granite mermaid located on the port-of-call cruise ship dock in Copenhagen; and the famous Little Mermaid statue, located on the water’s edge along Langelinie promenade.

== Mermaids in Danish folklore ==
The original ballad "Agnete and the Merman", or in Danish "Agnete og Havmanden", is one of the many fairy tales found in Danish folklore. The poem was passed on by word of mouth for generations, like numerous other folktales. Mermaids and other mer-people are recurring figures in traditional Danish lore. The Danish author Hans Christian Andersen's popular story "The Little Mermaid" (the basis of the Disney animated film) inspired the Little Mermaid statue in Copenhagen, which has been deemed not only a popular tourist attraction but also a symbol of the country itself. In 1832 Andersen wrote a letter to Edvard Collin (1808-1886), the son of his patron Jonas Collin (1776-1861), in which he outlined his concept for a long verse play akin to Oehlenschläger’s famous “Aladdin” called ‘Agnete and the Merman’. The sculptures that represent the story of Agnete and the Merman symbolize the cultural importance of Danish folklore to the people of Copenhagen. Much as the Greeks eternalized their mythology with statues of Artemis and Poseidon, Suste Bonnén used bronze to capture a specific story of love and loss.
