= Circle Bridge =

Cirkelbroen
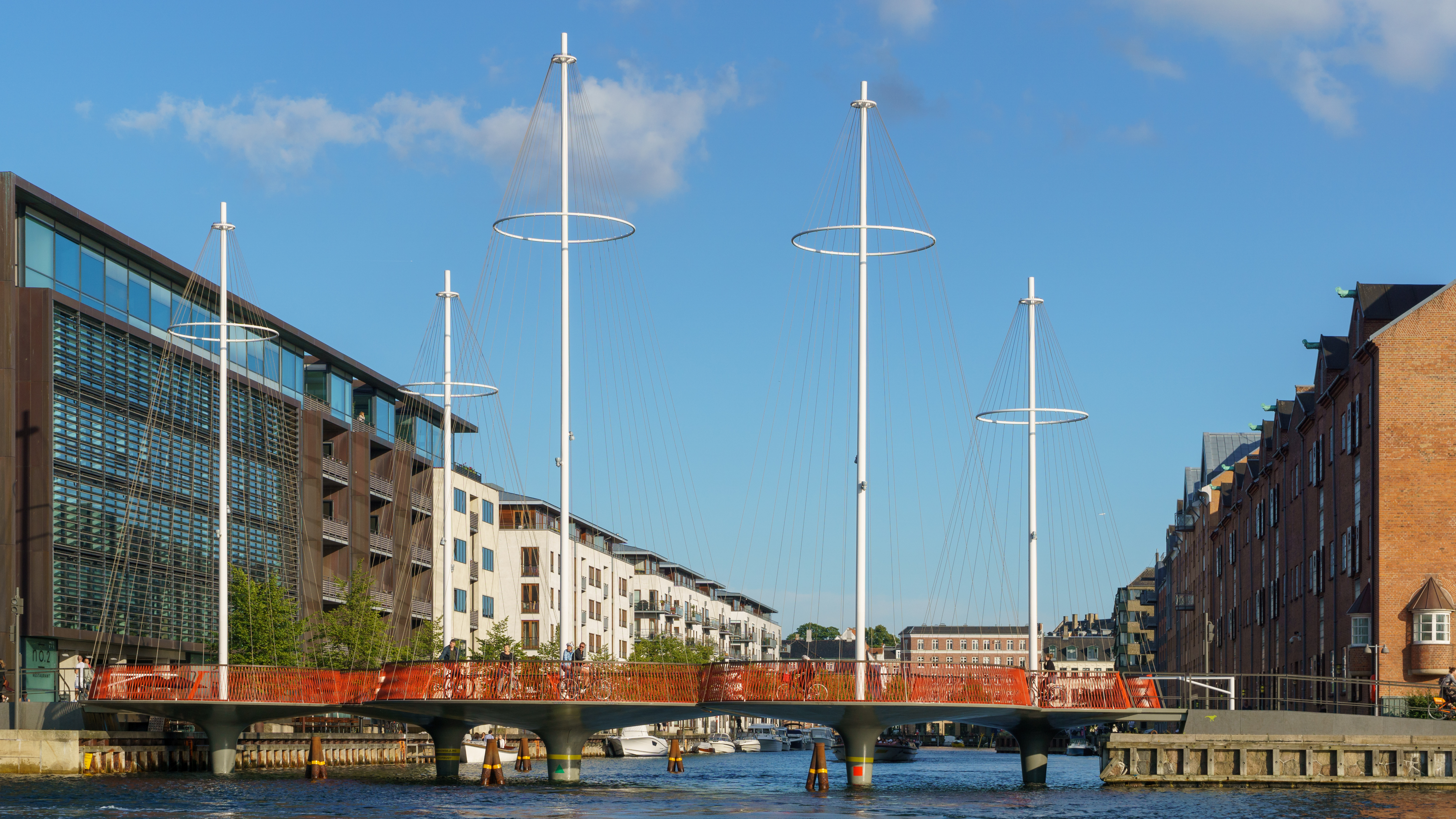
- Coordinates: 55°40′20.44″N 12°35′1.86″E
- Carries: Pedestrian and bicycle traffic
- Crosses: Copenhagen Harbour
- Locale: Applebys Plads; Christiansbro

Characteristics
- Design: steel structure
- Total length: 40 metres (130 ft)

History
- Designer: Olafur Eliasson
- Opened: 22 August 2015

Location
- Interactive map of Cirkelbroen

The Circle Bridge (also called the Five Circles Footbridge; Danish: Cirkelbroen) is a 40-metre-long pedestrian and bicycle bridge spanning the southern mouth of Christianshavn Canal in the Christianshavn district of central Copenhagen, Denmark. It connects Applebys Plads to the south with Christiansbro to the north. Designed by Olafur Eliasson and opened in 2015, the bridge consists of five interconnected circular decks of slightly varying diameters. Their outer edges are supported by a total of 110 inclined suspension cables extending from the tops of tall masts positioned at the centres of the decks. Two of the circular decks can swing open together to accommodate water traffic through the canal.

== Construction ==
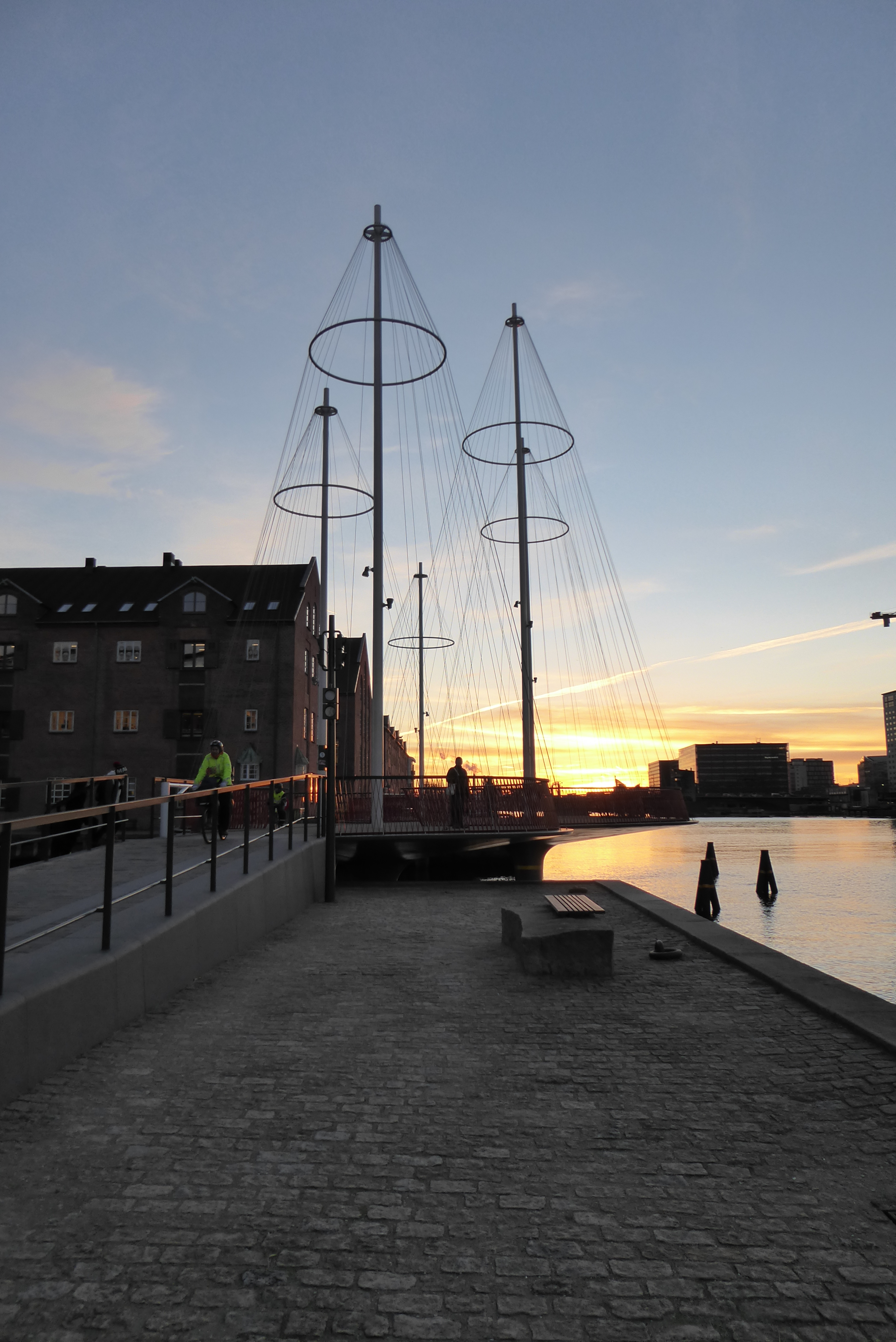
Cirkelbroen seen from the north

The bridge was a gift from the Nordea Foundation. It opened on 22 August 2015.

== Description ==
The bridge consists of five round decks with masts of different heights. The masts are held up by 110 metal cables, giving the bridge a resemblance to a series of sailing yachts. The form highlights the reverse slope of the bridge's rails, which are made of wood from the Brazilian guariuba tree (Clarisia racemosa).

== See also ==
- List of bridges in Denmark
- List of bridges in Copenhagen
