= Hazewind, Gieten =

Windmill in Gieten, Netherlands

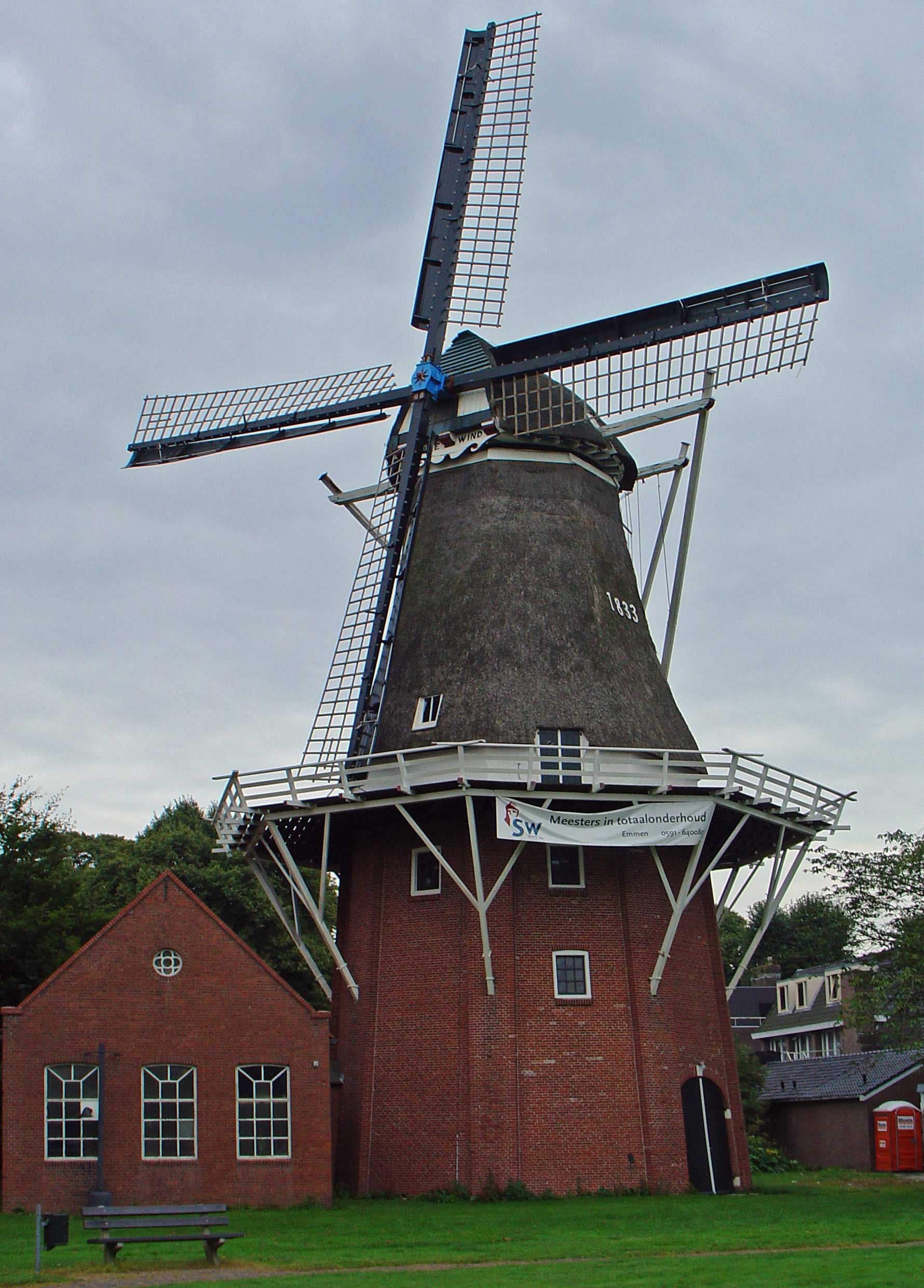
- Molen Hazewind, August 2008

Origin
- Mill name: Hazewind
- Mill location: Bij Naweg 4, 9461 BJ, Gieten
- Coordinates: 53°00′23″N 6°45′43″E
- Operator(s): Private
- Year built: 1833

Information
- Purpose: Corn mill and barley mill
- Type: Smock mill
- Storeys: Three-storey smock
- Base storeys: Four-storey base
- Smock sides: Eight sides
- No. of sails: Four sails
- Type of sails: Common sails
- Windshaft: cast iron
- Winding: Tailpole and winch
- No. of pairs of millstones: Three pairs
- Size of millstones: 1.40 metres (4 ft 7 in), 1.50 metres (4 ft 11 in) and 1.65 metres (5 ft 5 in) diameter

Hazewind is a smock mill in Gieten, Drenthe, Netherlands. It was built in 1833 and has been restored to working order. The mill is listed as a Rijksmonument, number 16126.

== History ==
In the early nineteenth century, farmers in Gieten had to take their corn to Eext, Gasselte or Annerveen to be ground. In 1805, two builders from Oosterhesselen who had been restoring the church at Gieten proposed that a windmill should be built. Although there were many supporters there were also a lot of objectors to the plan. Among the objectors were Messrs Braams, Hiddingh and Grevelink, millers at Eext, Gasselte and Annerveen respectively. Therefore, the plan to build a windmill at Gieten was put on ice.

In 1832, Bernier Lucas Homan proposed the erection of a windmill at Bonnen, but then decided that it should be built behind his house in Gieten. The local council insisted that it was erected 20 metres (22 yd) away from the public highway because it was considered that horses would be frightened and that there was a danger from pieces of the sails being blown off. The mill was completed in 1833. At first, the entrance to the mill was between Homan's house and the Hotel Braams, but the noise from farmers' carts delivering corn early in the morning lead to complaints and a new access to the mill was provided from the Eexterweg.

The mill was worked until 1936. It remained in the Homan family until 1947 when it was sold to E Greving for ƒ4.000. Many visitors to the mill left their graffiti behind. A restoration was undertaken in 1964 when new sails were fitted. The mill was described by Het Nieusblad van het Noorden in 1965 as "one of the oldest corn mills now standing in Drenthe". It was at this time that it gained the name Hazewind. Other names suggested included d'Olle Wiev'n, Mulders Lust, Liefst Altijd Draaien and Hard Gezwoegd.

A problem arose from development in Gieten. New houses built around the mill and the growth of oak and lime trees reduced the amount of wind that was available to drive the mill, even though it was raised on a four-storey brick base some 10 metres (32 ft 10 in) high. As part of the solution, some of the trees were cut down. A further restoration was carried out in 2004, new sails were fitted.

== Description ==
Hazewind is what the Dutch describe as an "achtkante stellingmolen". It is a smock mill with a stage. The mill has a four-storey brick base, with the stage at third-floor level, 9.40 metres (30 ft 10 in) above ground level. The mill has a three-storey smock which is thatched, as is the cap. The four common sails, which have a span of 22.00 metres (72 ft 2 in) are carried in a cast-iron windshaft which was cast by Prins van Oranje, The Hague in 1895. The windshaft also carries the brake wheel which has 65 cogs. This drives the wallower (35 cogs) at the top of the upright shaft. At the bottom of the upright shaft, the great spur wheel, which has 85 cogs, drives two pairs of French Burr millstones via lantern pinion stone nuts with 25 staves each. These millstones are used for grinding wheat. The pearl barley stones are not complete, and the drive for them is missing.

== Public access ==
Hazewind is open to the public on Saturdays.
