= Bonnen =

Bonnen is a surname. Notable people with the surname include:

- Dennis Bonnen (born 1972), American politician
- Dietmar Bonnen (born 1958), German composer and pianist
- Folmer Bonnén (1885–1960), Danish painter and journalist
- Greg Bonnen (born 1966), American politician
- Helge Bonnén (1896–1983), Danish composer and pianist
- Suste Bonnén (born 1948), Danish photographer and sculptor
