= Stormbro =

Stormbro(en)
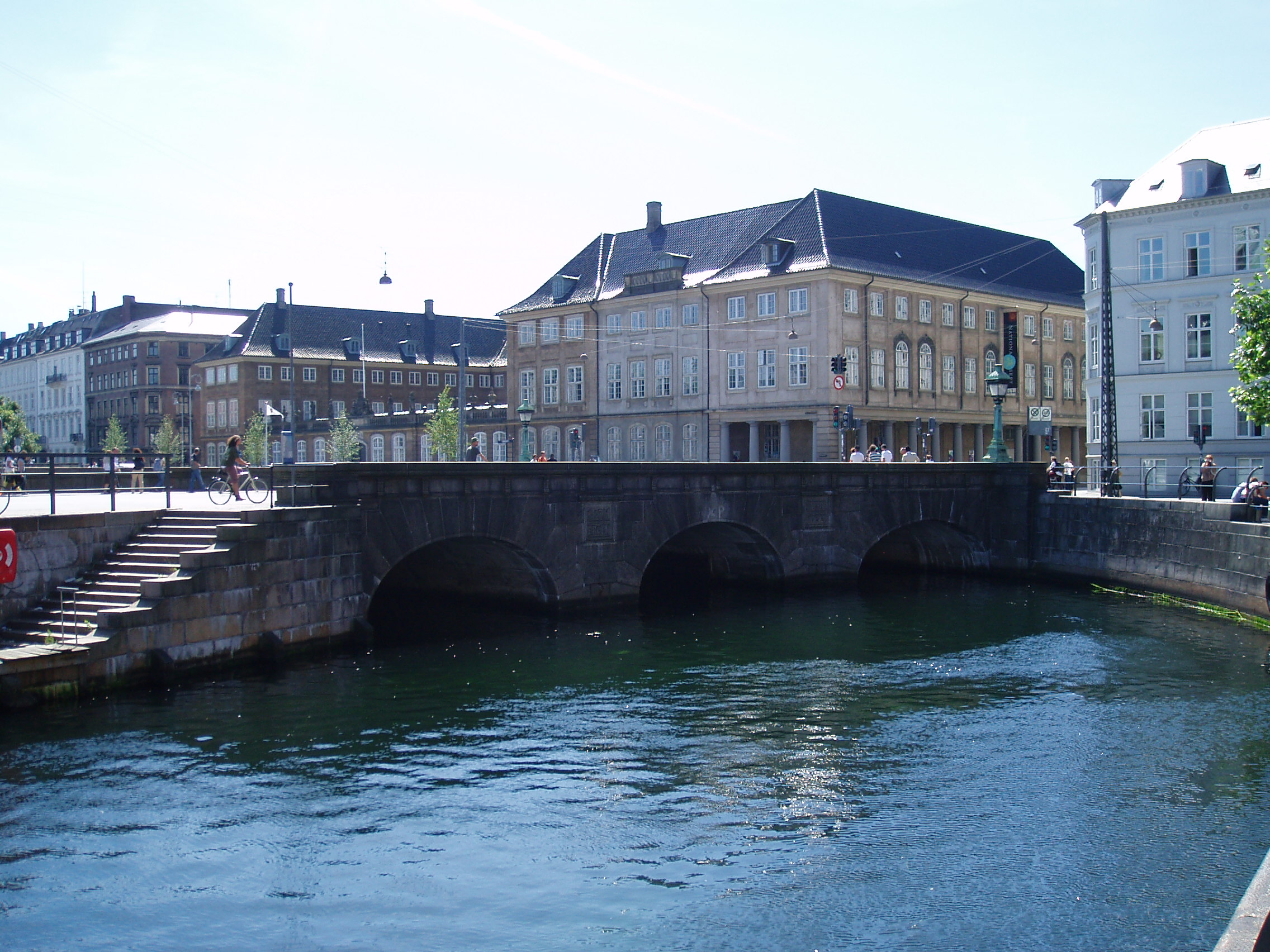
- Storm Bridge with National Museum ( Prince's Mansion) as a backdrop
- Coordinates: 55.675624°N 12.57595°E
- Carries: Motor vehicles, pedestrian and bicycle traffic
- Crosses: Frederiksholms Kanal / Slotsholmens Kanal
- Locale: Copenhagen, Denmark

Characteristics
- Design: Arch bridge

History
- Designer: Martin Nyrop
- Opened: 1918

Stormbro (English: Storm Bridge) is a small arch bridge in Copenhagen, Denmark, marking the transition between Slotsholmen Canal and Frederiksholm Canal, two sections of the canal which separates from the rest of the city centre. It links Stormgade (towards City Hall) with Vindebrogade on Slotsholmen (towards Kongens Nytorv).

== History ==
The bridge is named after the Storm on Copenhagen in 1659. It was at this spot, where the city ramparts at that time were located, that the Swedish troops made their principal attack. After a series of defeats, the Danish troops finally gained victory, the Swedish troops leaving 2,000 dead soldiers in front of the ramparts at Stormgade.

Various sources state that the bridge was erected in 1681 but on the side the inscription "erected in MDCLX" is carved into its stone foundation.

== Current bridge ==
The bridge was renovated by Martin Nyrop in 1918. It is built in stone and has three arches.

== See also ==
- Højbro
