= Agnete og Havmanden =

Scandinavian ballad

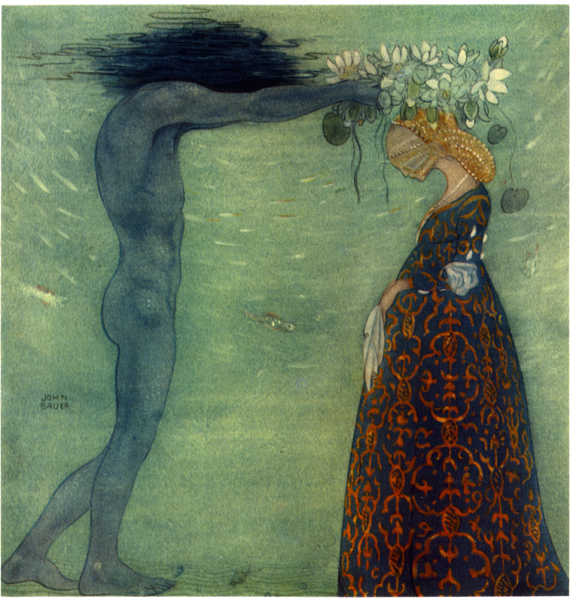
Sjökungens drottning (1911) by John Bauer, published in Bland tomtar och troll to illustrate Helena Nybloms retelling of the ballad.

"Agnete og Havmanden" (Danish) or "Agneta och havsmannen" (Swedish) (lit. 'Agnete and the merman') is a ballad (The Types of the Scandinavian Medieval Ballad A 47, Merman's wife returns to earth; Danmarks gamle Folkeviser 38; Sveriges Medeltida Ballader 19). It is also found in Norway and as a prose folktale published by Just Mathias Thiele in his 1818 Danske Folkesagn, though Thomas Bredsdorff has argued that this prose version is of literary rather than folkloric origin. The ballad too is generally thought to be relatively late in its composition, perhaps from the eighteenth century.

== Synopsis ==
In the ballad, a merman woos Agnete to leave her children behind and come and live with him in the sea. She does so and has several children by him. But one day she hears the ringing of church bells and with the merman's permission returns to land to visit the church. In some versions, the images of saints in the church turn away from Agnete when she enters. She meets her mother, telling her about her new aquatic life. In most variants, she then abandons the merman and the children she bore by him, choosing to remain with her former family. In some versions from all regions, however, she returns to the sea.

== Analysis ==
The work has been characterized as a ballad laden with Christian values by literature professor Hans Brix and others. (Note: Also by Oluf Friis and Marie-Louise Svane.) However, there are also commentators that perceive sympathy towards the forsaken merman, such as C. Hostrup or Iørn Piø.

The ballad's ending, where the woman states she will not miss her children one whit, stands out as being anomalous behavior for heroines (ones abducted by supernatural beings) in Danish balladry. On this point, Thiele's prose version offers an elaboration, that these were "ugly little children" produced between the merman and her. Another hypothesis advanced is that the woman's behavior is topsy-turvy by design of the author; both the cold-heartedness of the woman and the powerless merman were a deliberate flip of what occurs in traditional Danish ballads (which feature a maiden seduced by a supernatural being), thus creating a "travesty", i.e., comic satire.

== Origins ==
Although it may share its origins with other Danish ballads (transmission from 13th-century French folk songs), this ballad was set down in writing quite late, and is lacking from the collections of Anders Sørensen Vedel (1591) or Peder Syv (1695).

The written work may date to the late 18th century.

== Reception ==
Despite its late origin, it grew to become one of the most popular ballads in both Denmark and Sweden. It has been described as the best-known and most widely discussed in all of Danish balladry.

During the Danish Romantic Period, the motif inspired Jens Baggesen's poem "Agnes fra Holmegaard" (1808) and Adam Oehlenschläger's "Agnete" (1812). Hans Christian Andersen worked the material into the play Agnete og Havmanden (1834) which was staged, accompanied by the music of Niels Gade, but the show was a flop.

It also plays a significant role in Problema III of Kierkegaard's Fear and Trembling (1843).

The ballad was the basis for Matthew Arnold's 1849 poem "The Forsaken Merman", although Arnold's heroine being named "Margaret" has led to the claim that the actual source might be the folklore account published by Just Mathias Thiele, where the woman enticed by the merman is named "Grethe".

Another derivative work is Henrik Ibsen's 1888 play Fruen fra havet. Poul Anderson wrote a sequel novel The Merman's Children, about her children.

== Outer appearance ==
Although the merman in the ballad might be conceived of as half human and half fish, or such beings that can also transform into the guise of a normal human male, he was sung of in the ballad as a presumably handsome man with hair "like the purest gold (som det pureste Guld). This golden haired man in the Danish original has been changed to a man whose "beard was green" in English translation by George Borrow. A merman such that "his beard was greener than the salt sea; his shape was pleasing" is described in Thiele's prose version, which Borrow has translated.

Oehlenschläger's poem has the merman saying that he has seven hundred mermaids in waiting, who are "like a woman above, and like a fish below". Whereas in the Poul Anderson novel the merfolk are legged, and look much like humans except for their bluish or green hair.

There is also the 20th-century sculpture (Agnete and the Merman) on display in Copenhagen.

== Editions ==
=== Danish ===
- Abrahamson, Werner Hans Frederik [in Danish]; Nyerup, Rasmus; Rahbek, Knud Lyne, eds. (1812), "L. Agnete og Havmanden", Udvalgte danske viser fra middelalderen, vol. 1, J.F. Schultz, pp. 313–315. (Note: ANR 50 = DgF 38Ak.)

=== English ===
- Borrow, George, ed. (1826), "The Deceived Merman", Romantic ballads, tr. from the Danish; and miscellaneous pieces, J. Taylor, pp. 120–121 (ver. Ak, redaction)
- Prior, R. C. Alexander (1860). "CLIII. Agnes and the Merman". Ancient Danish Ballads. Vol. 3. London: Williams and Norgate. pp. 329–324. (ver. Ak, redaction)
- —— (1860). "CLIV. Agnes and the Hill-King". Ancient Danish Ballads. Vol. 3. London: Williams and Norgate. pp. 335–357. (ver. C)
