= Langebro =

Danish road bridge

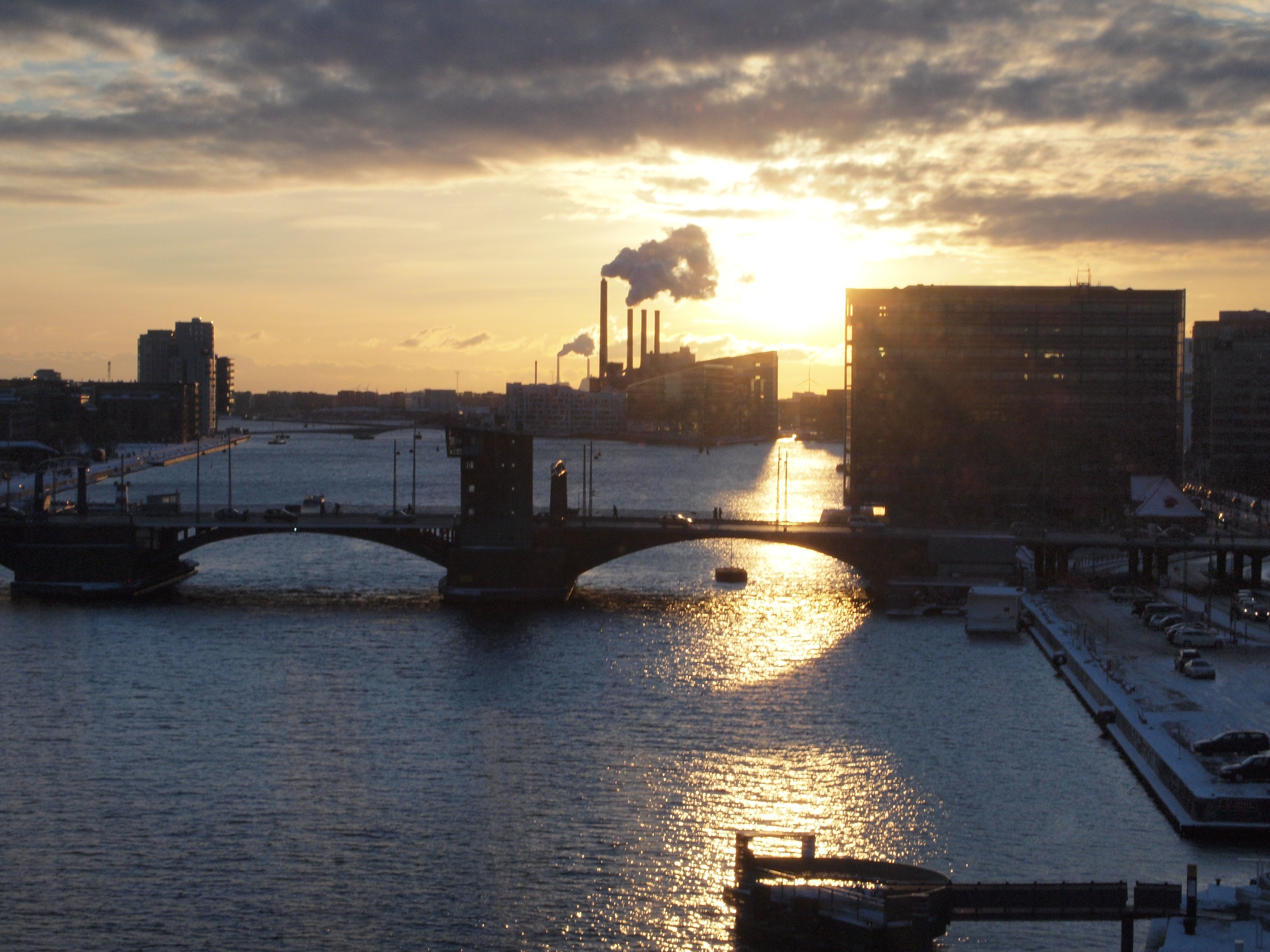
- Coordinates: 55°40′13.08″N 12°34′43.46″E
- Carries: Motor vehicles, pedestrian and bicycle traffic
- Crosses: Copenhagen Inner Harbour
- Locale: City Centre; Islands Brygge

Characteristics
- Design: Bascule bridge
- Total length: 250 metres (820 ft)
- Clearance above: 7 metres (23 ft)

History
- Designer: Kaj Gottlob
- Construction start: 1949
- Construction end: 1954

Location
- Interactive map of Langebro

Langebro (lit. 'Long Bridge') is a bascule bridge across the Inner Harbour of Copenhagen, Denmark, connecting Zealandside H. C. Andersens Boulevard to Amagerside Amager Boulevard. It is one of only two bridges to carry motor vehicles across the harbour in central Copenhagen, the other being Knippelsbro.

== History ==
=== 1690: The first Langebro ===
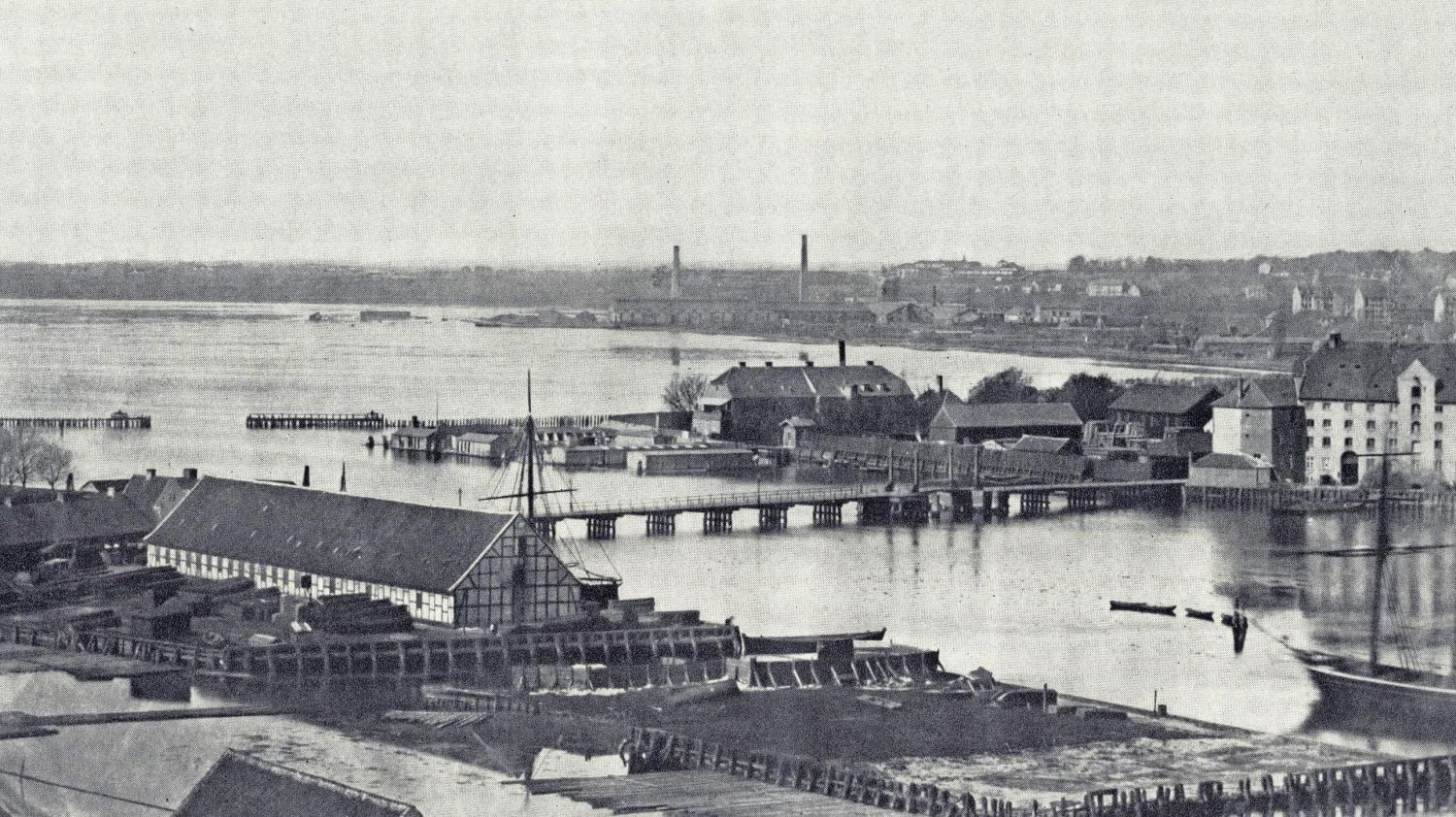
Langebro in c. 1860 from the tower of Christian's Church

Completed in 1690, the first bridge located roughly where Langebro is today was known as Kalvebodbro (Kalvebod Bridge) and connected the Western Rampart's Rysensteen Bastion on Zealand with Christianshavn Rampart's Christianshavns Vold#Kalvebod Bastion on Christianshavn. It was a wooden structure with a drawbridge in the middle that allowed ships to pass. The bridge was built for the military but was also open to civilian pedestrians.

The bridge was refurbished several times. It was widened in 1875–76.

=== 1903: The Swing Bridge ===
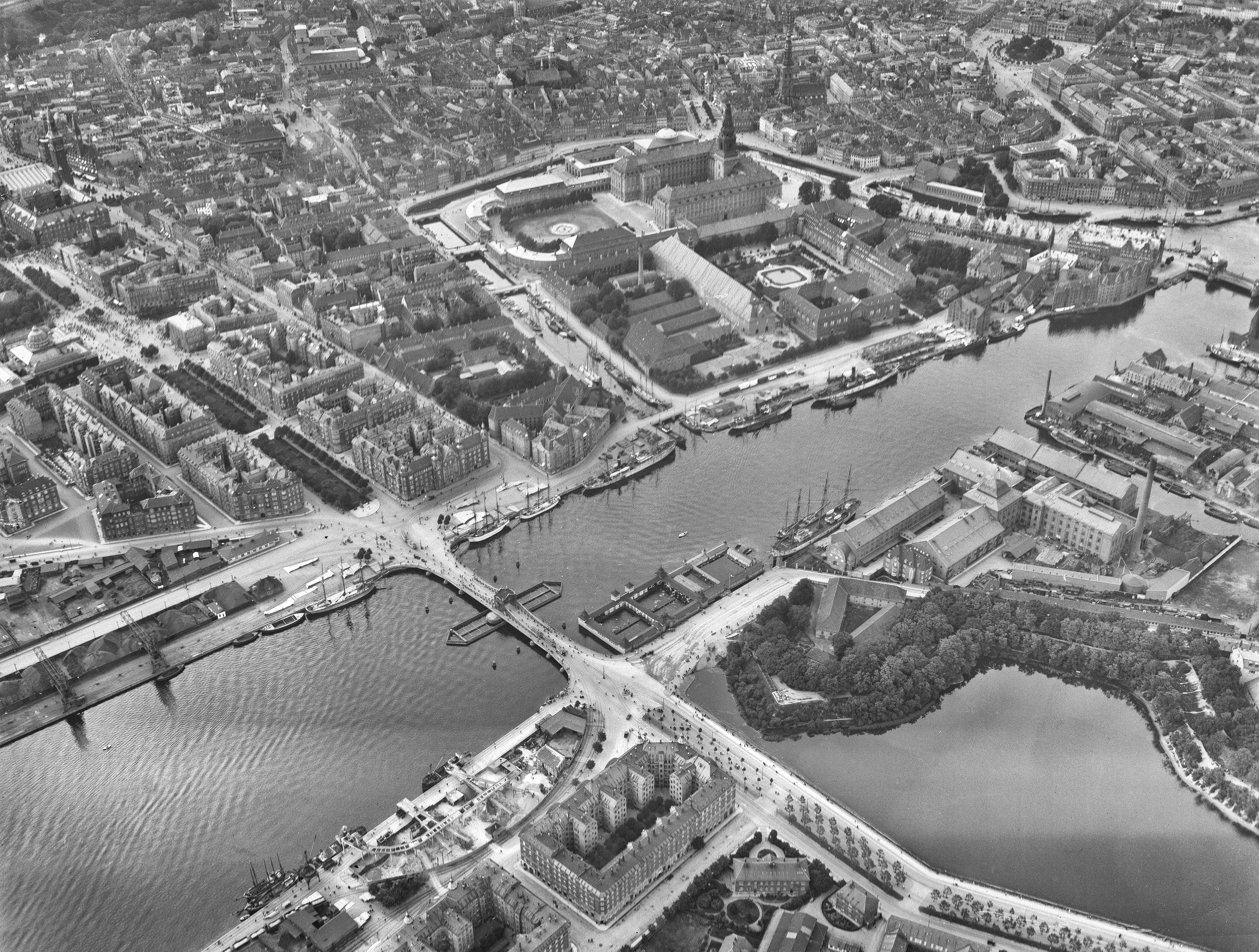
The swing bridge in 1923 with Amager Boulevard in the bottom right corner

Plans for a new Langebro were first presented in 1885 but not realized until 1903. The new bridge was located 400 ft to the south of the old one, Vestre Boulevard (now H. C. Andersens Boulevard) and connected to the Amager Boulevard on the other side of the harbor. It was a swing bridge resting on nine stone pillars.

The swing bridge was used for both trams and the Amagerbanen railroad.

=== 1939: The temporary bridge ===
With growing automobile traffic, the new bridge soon became outdated and a new temporary bridge was constructed in 1930. The bridge was subject to sabotage on 23 March 1945.

=== 1954 ===
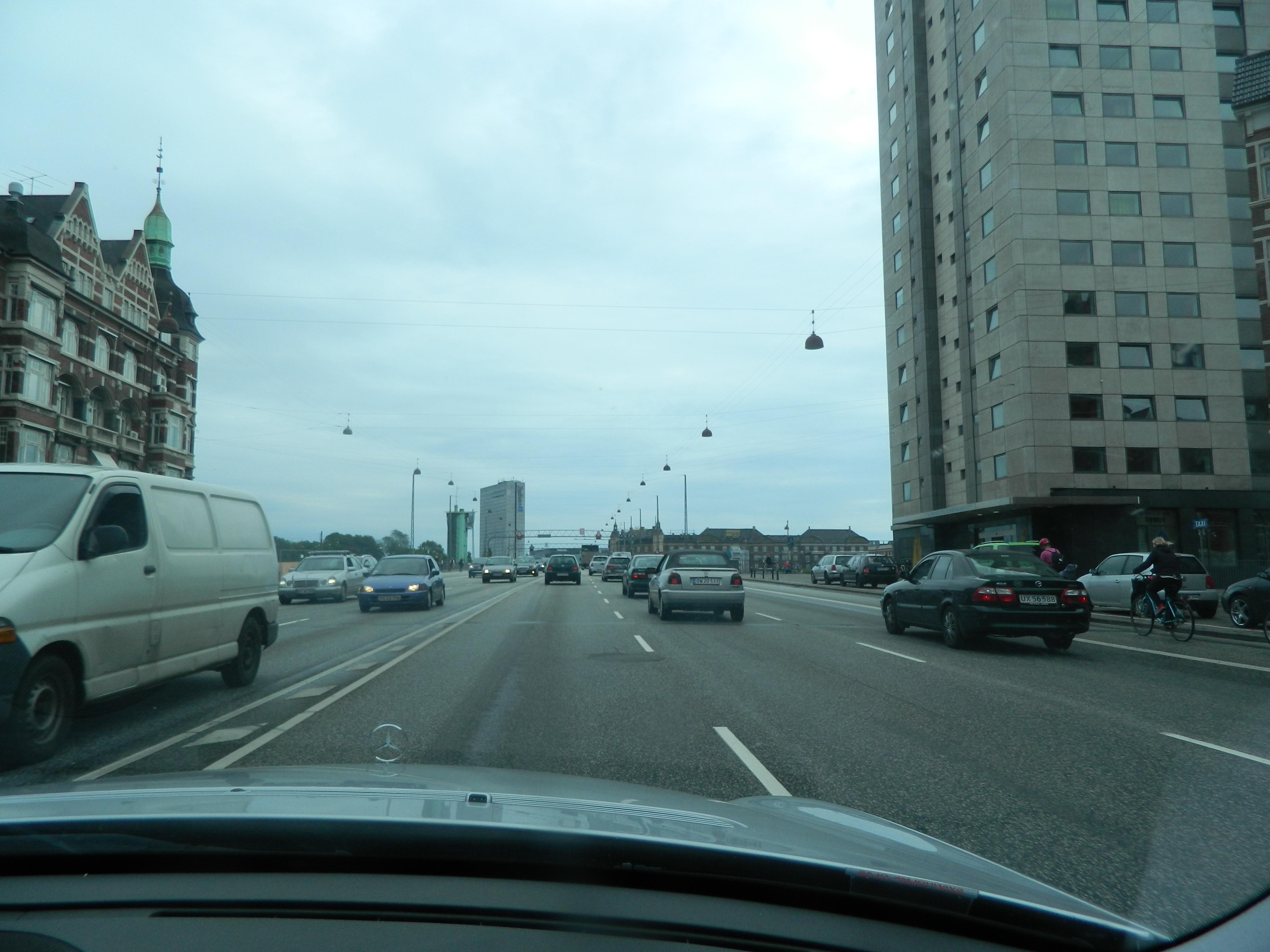
Langebro today. In direction towards Amager.

The temporary bridge was replaced by the current Langebro in 1954.

=== Lille Langebro ===
Lille Langebro pedestrian and cycling bridge north of Langebro was completed in 2019.

== Cultural references ==
- Søren Kierkegaard's pseudonymous author, Hilarius Bookbinder, mentions the bridge in Stages on Life's Way (1845): "Langebro [Long Bridge] has its name from its length; that is, as a bridge it is long but is not much as a roadway, as one easily finds out by passing over it. Then when one is standing on the other side in Christianshavn, it in turn seems that the bridge must nevertheless be long, because one is far, very far away from Copenhagen." (Stages on Life's Way p. 259)
- Langebro is a play by Hans Christian Andersen, named for the bridge in Copenhagen.
- The Danish-American 1961 cult film Reptilicus includes a sequence with crowds of panic-stricken people seeking to escape a giant monster by running or riding bicycles across Langebro; when the bridge-keeper panics and opens the bridge, many of the people fall through the gap into the water below. On the film's American poster, Langebro is painted to look like San Francisco's Golden Gate Bridge.
- Langebro is seen in many of the Olsen-banden films, including The Olsen Gang, The Olsen Gang in a Fix (1:14:47) and The Olsen Gang on the Track (1:29:16).
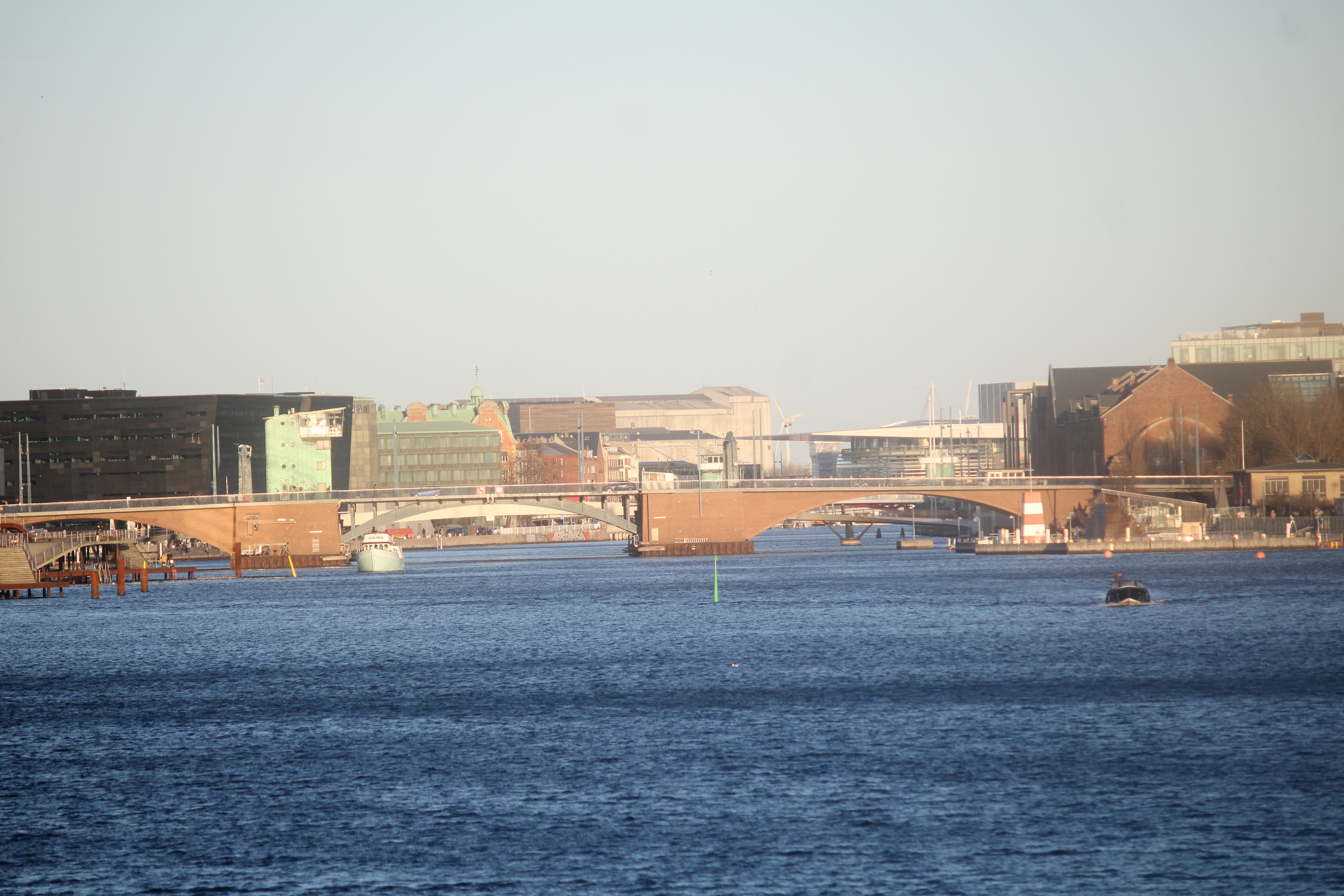
  Langebro as viewed from Havneholmen
- "Langebro" is the name of Gasolin's 1971 adaption of Joan Baez's version of Geordie, where the setting is shifted from London to Copenhagen and Langebro takes the place of London Bridge.

== Gallery ==
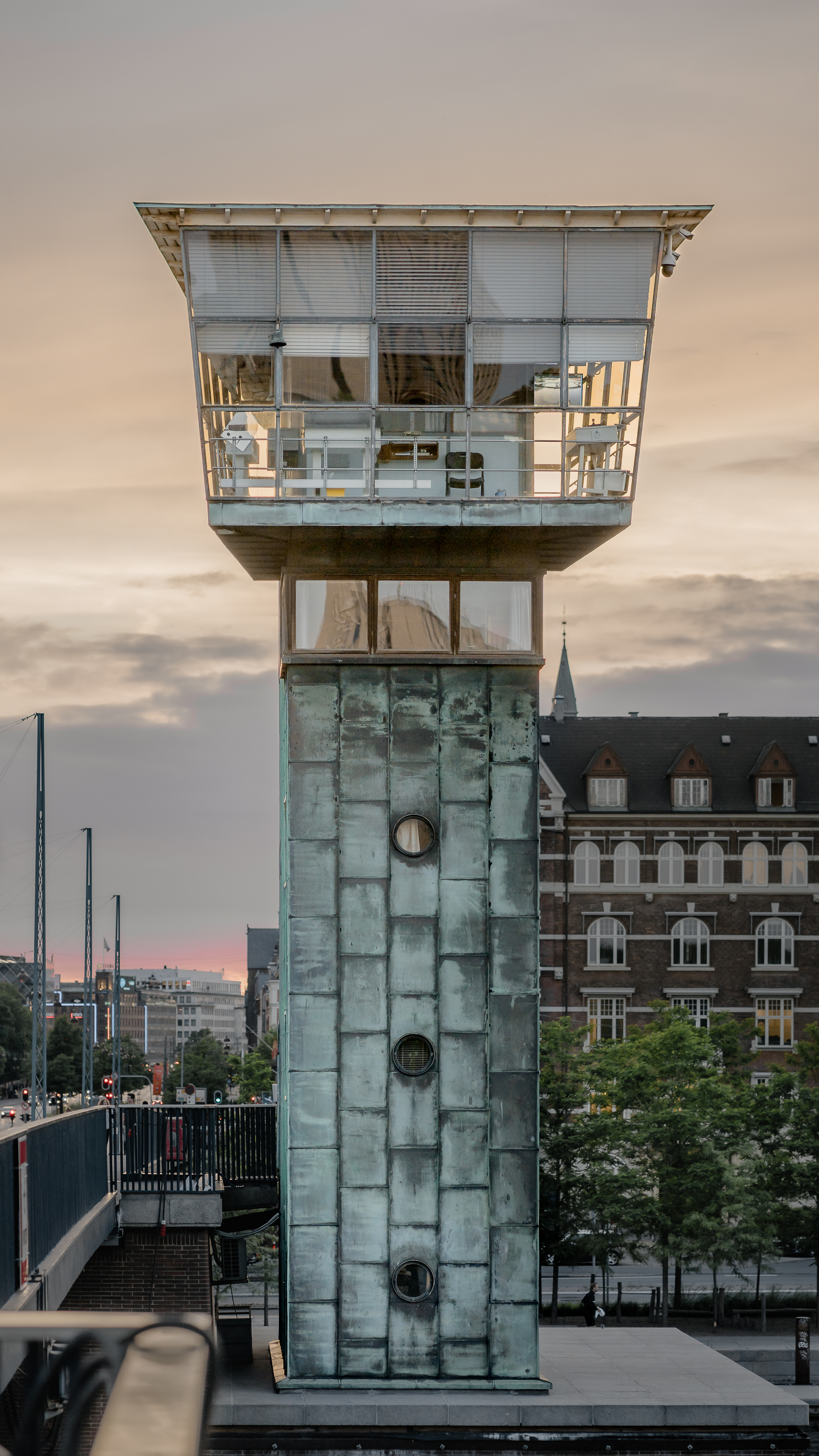
Langebro Control Tower, seen from southeast

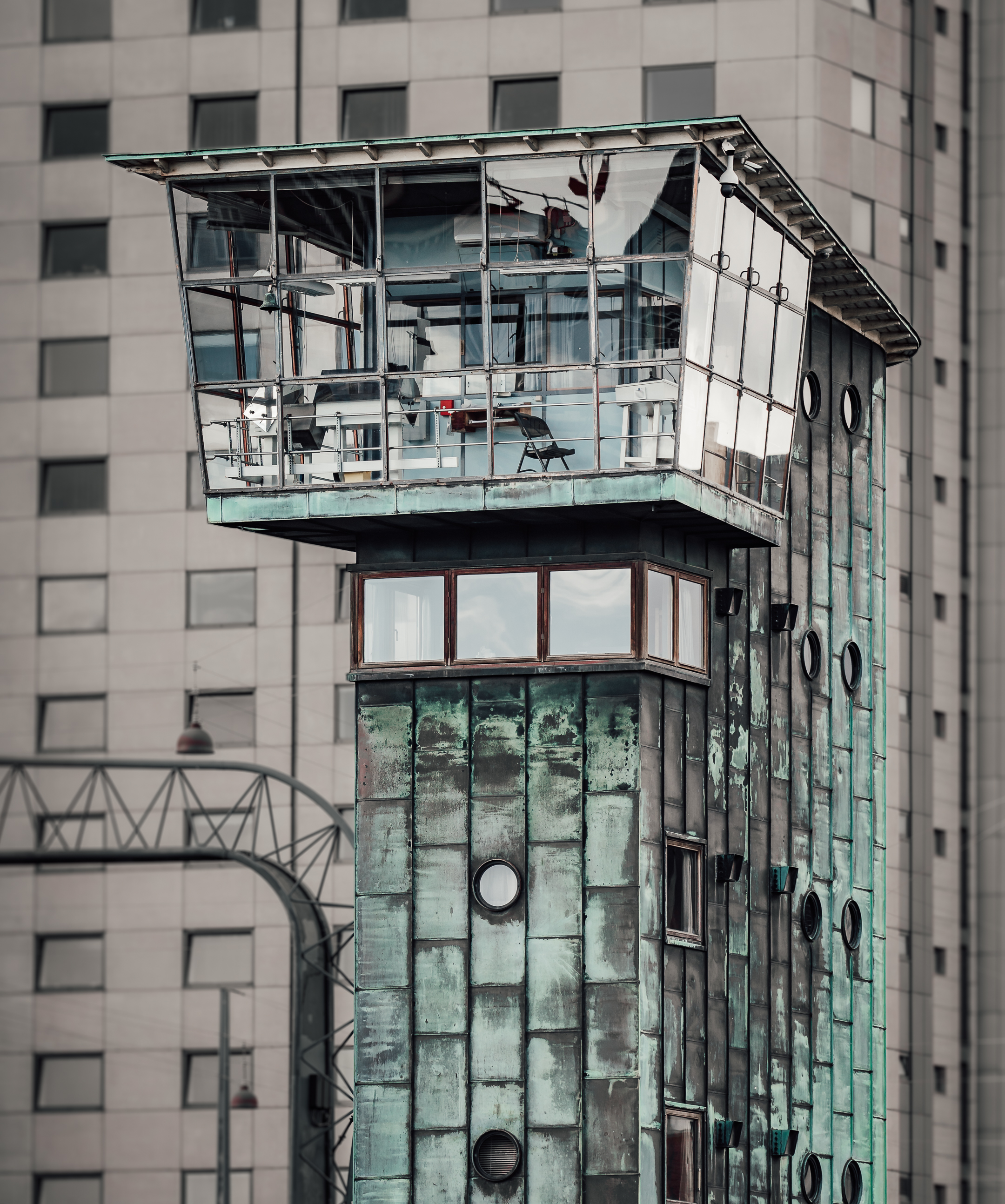
Langebro Control Tower, seen from east-southeast

== See also ==
- List of bridges in Copenhagen
