= Applebys Plads =

Square in Copenhagen, Denmark

Coordinates: 55.6714°N 12.5840°E

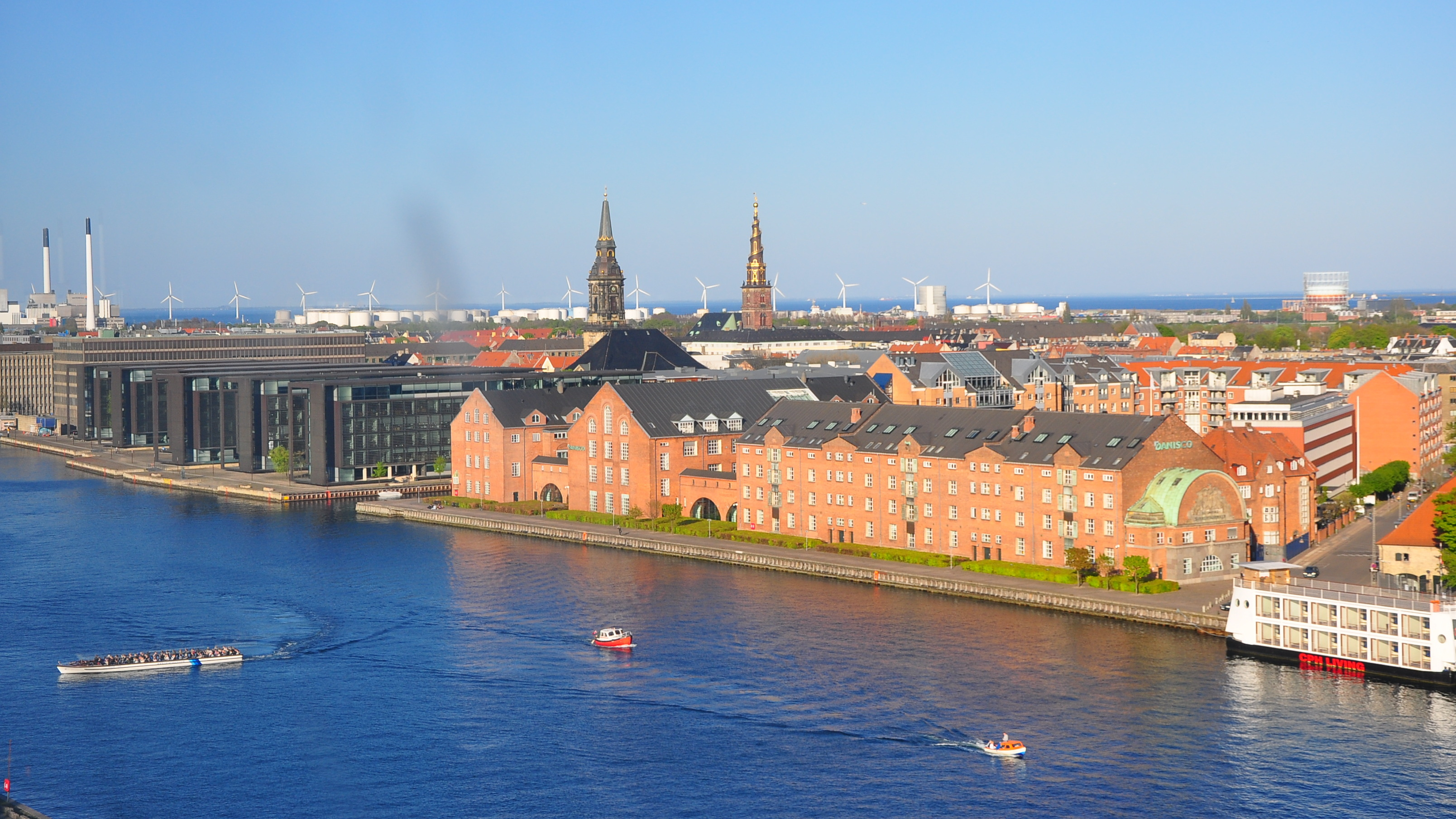
The waterfront with the former sugar factory, viewed from Langebro Bridge

Applebyes Plads is a triangular area located between Langebro Bridge and the southernmost portion of Christianshavn Canal at the southern tip of the Christianshavn neighbourhood in Copenhagen, Denmark. The area takes its name from Peter Applebye, Christian VI's rope maker, who ran his manufactury from the site in the late 18th century, although no buildings remain from that time. The Danish Sugar Factories' building along the waterfront dates from 1912 while the rest of the grounds have undergone residential redevelopment in later years.

The street Langebrogade, separating the area from Christianshavn Rampart to the south, provides a connection between Islands Brygge on Amager and eastern Christianshavn. The Olafur Eliasson-designed Circle Bridge provides a link between Applebys Plads and western Christianshavn across the mouth of Christianshavn Canal.

== Peter Appleby's ropewalk ==
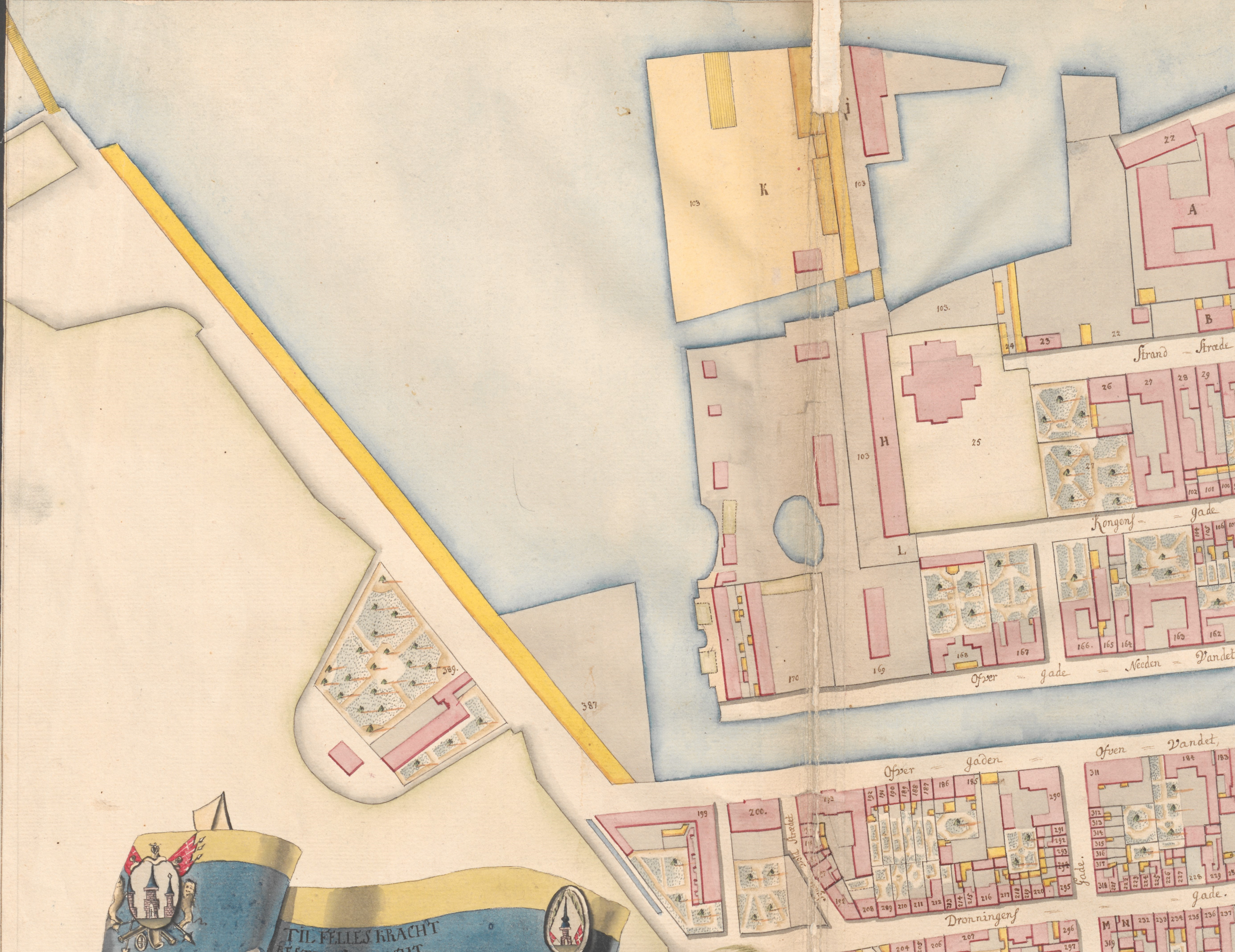
Applebyes Plas seen on a detail from Christian Gedde's map of Christianshavn Quarter, 1757. The Applebye House was situated at No. 199 (bottom middle) and his ropewalk was situated at No. 387 (above No, 199).

Founded in the early 17th century, Christianshavn was originally considerably smaller than at present. The area to the south of the new district was known as the Grønnegård Harbour (Danish: Grønnegårds Havn) and used as a winter port for the Royal Navy's ships, conveniently located opposite the Arsenal Dock where they would be equipped. Up through the century, the area was gradually sold off and filled. In 1695 the entire site was acquired by Jan van Osten who established a shipyard there.

With the foundation of Nyholm to the north of Christianshavn, the navy's ships gradually left the Grønnegård harbour. The Englishman Peter Appleby, who had been called to Copenhagen by Christian VI to make ropes for the Navy, received a deed on 2 Overgaden Over Vandet and was also given a strip of land along Langebrogade where he constructed a 300-metre long ropewalk.

In the 1750s Appleby carried out further reclamations on both sides of the canal, largely giving the area the layout it has today. He established a shipyard on the north side of the canal and was also active as a shipowner.

== Jacob Holm's terraces ==
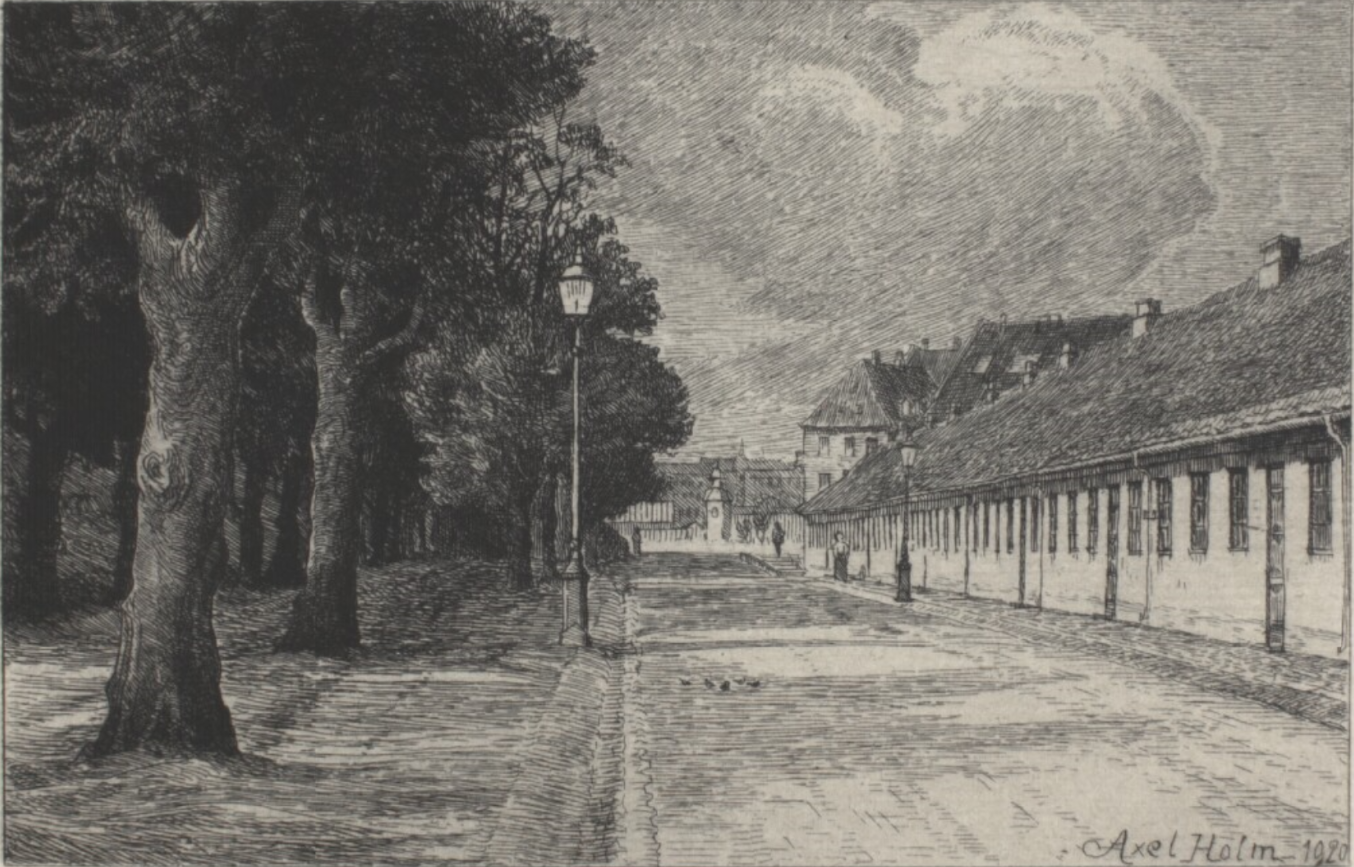
Jacob Holm's houses along Langebrogade in 1920

Peter Appleby's son Peter Appleby Jr. took over the company after his father's death but squandered the fortune and in 1833 sold Applebys Plads to Jacob Holm, who already owned a shipyard at Wilders Plads and had established Denmark's first industrialized production of rope in 1811. Holm converted Appleby's long ropewalk building into 103 residences for workers at his shipyard and factories in 1833. They were known as Holm's Houses and are described as the first example of workers' housing in Denmark.

== The sugar refinery ==
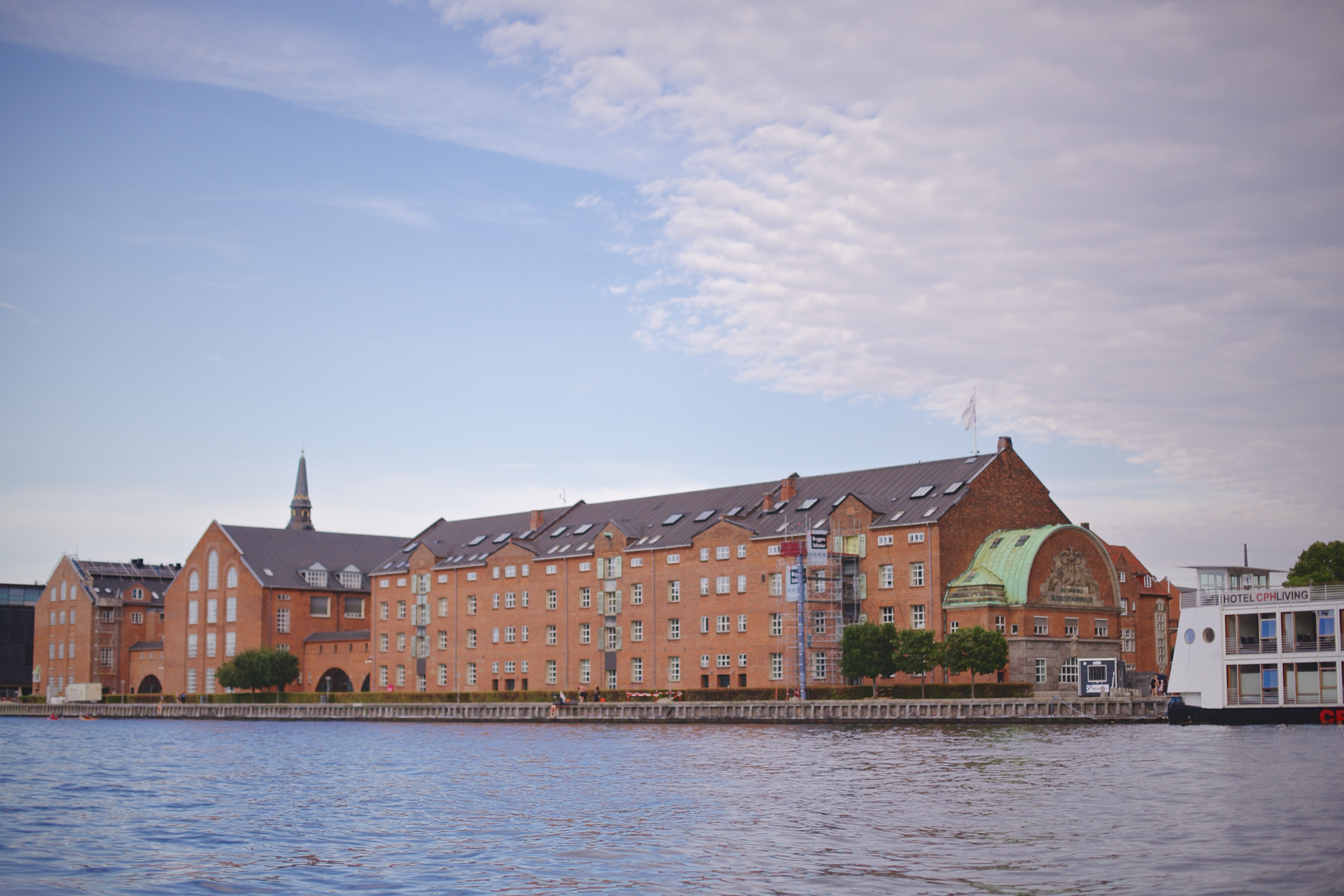
The Phoenix Warehouse

In 1897, De Danske Sukkerfabrikker (lit. 'the Danish Sugar Factories'), one of the many companies founded by Carl Frederik Tietgen, acquired Applebys Plads, while Burmeister & Wain, another Tietgen company, took over the area on the other side of the canal. After a fire at one of their other plants, the sugar factory constructed a new sugar refinery along the waterfront in 1912. The site later served as headquarters for Danisco until the company was taken over by Nordzucker in 2009.

== Redevelopment ==
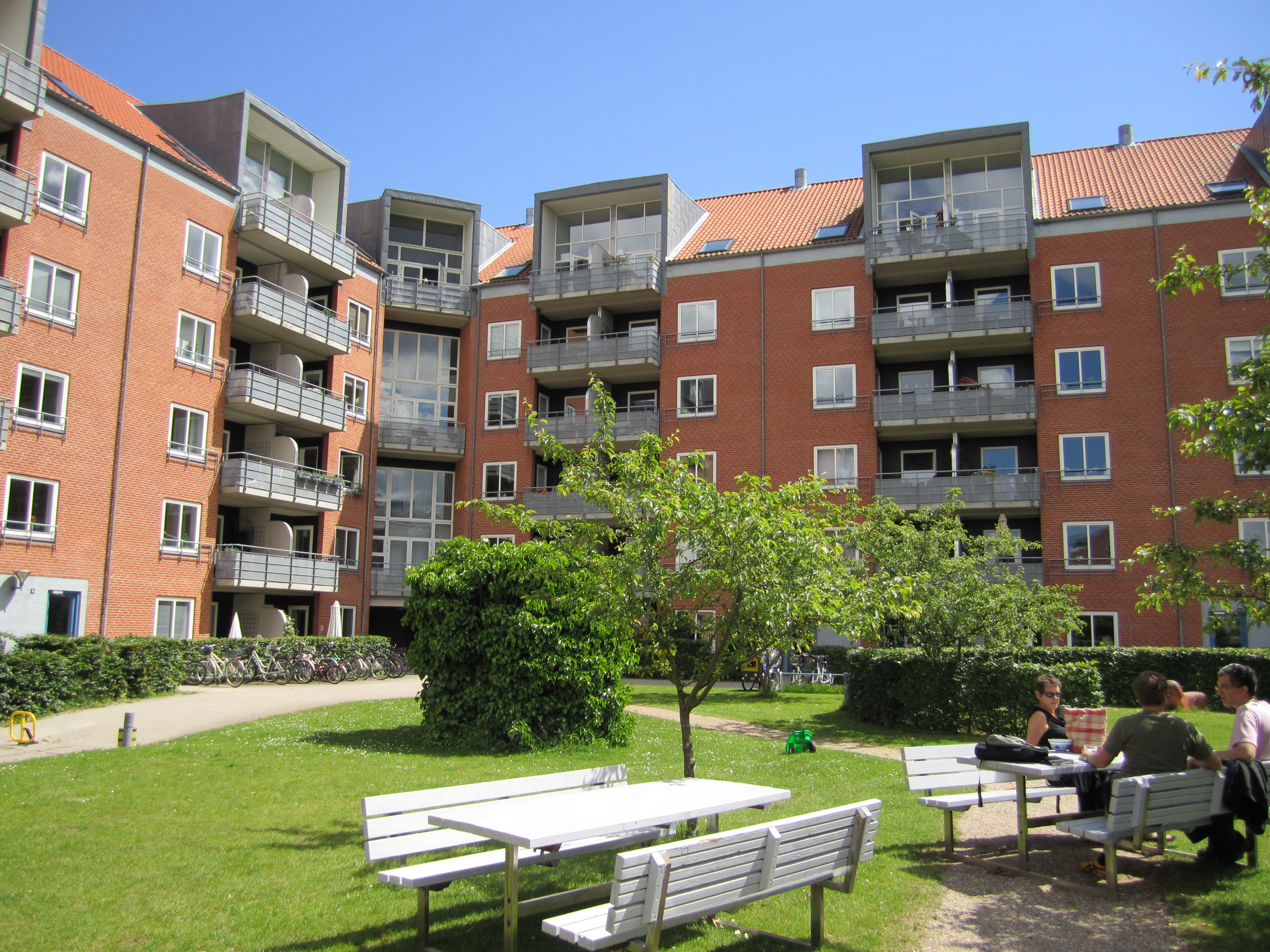
Applebys Have

A minor part of Holm's Terraces was demolished in the 1930s to make way for Voldgården, a residential development, while the long row along Langebrogade survived until the late 1950s.

A large portion of Applebys Plads was redeveloped between 1995 and 1996 when a residential development was built to designs by Hvidt & Mølgaard. It consists of six-storey buildings arranged in an open block structure around a garden complex with pergolas and a playground.

== Ships ==
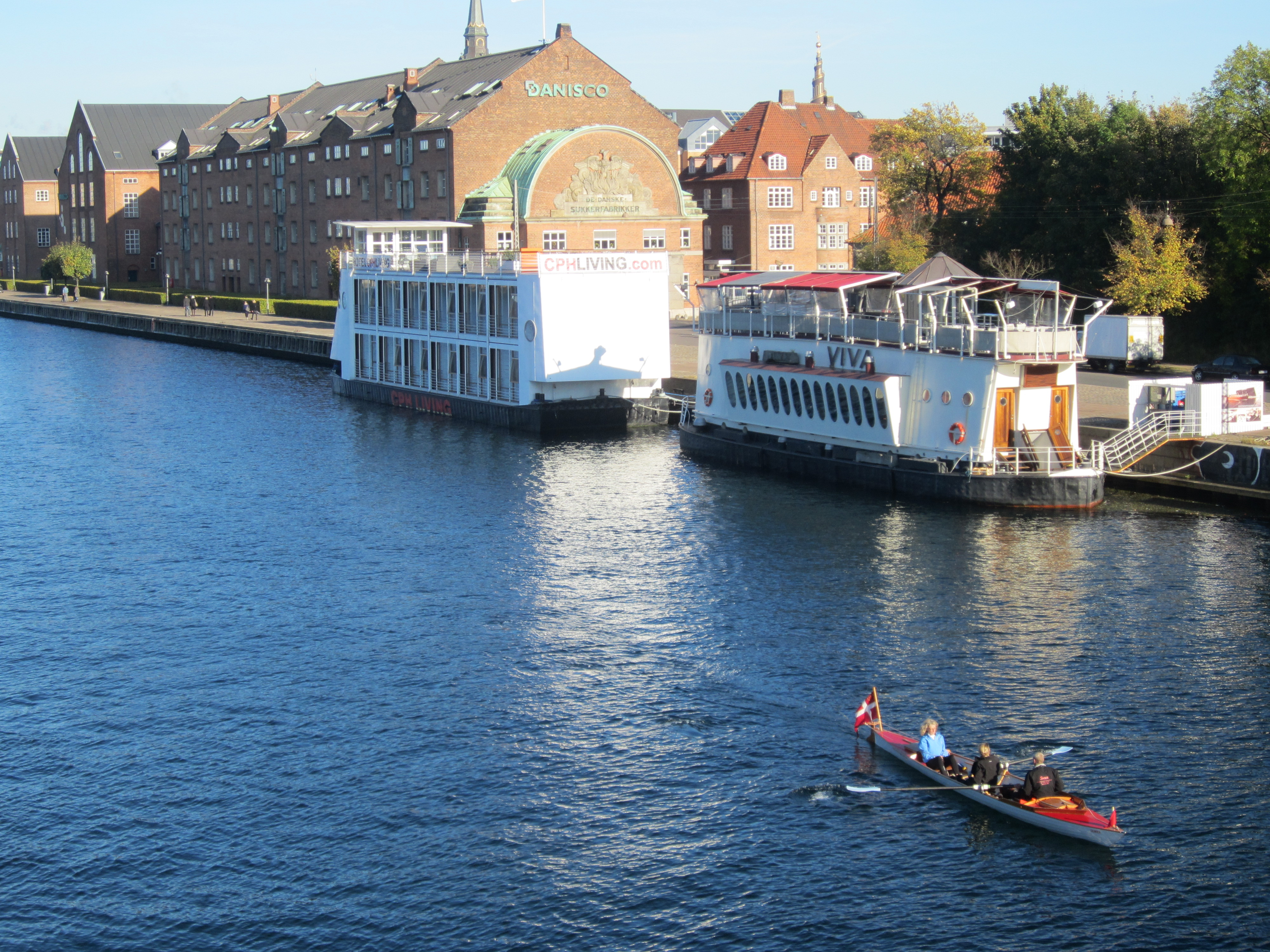
The two ships

Two boats are permanently docked at the quay. Viva is a restaurant ship. It was adapted for its current use at a shipyard in Nyborg and was first opened as a restaurant at Applebys Plads by former TV-chef Paolo Guimaraes. The other boat, Hotel Cph Living, is a 12-room hotel ship. It first opened in 2008.

== See also ==
- Asiatisk Plads
- Wilders Plads
