= Lille Langebro =

Pedestrian double-swing bridge in Denmark

Little long bridge Lille Langebro
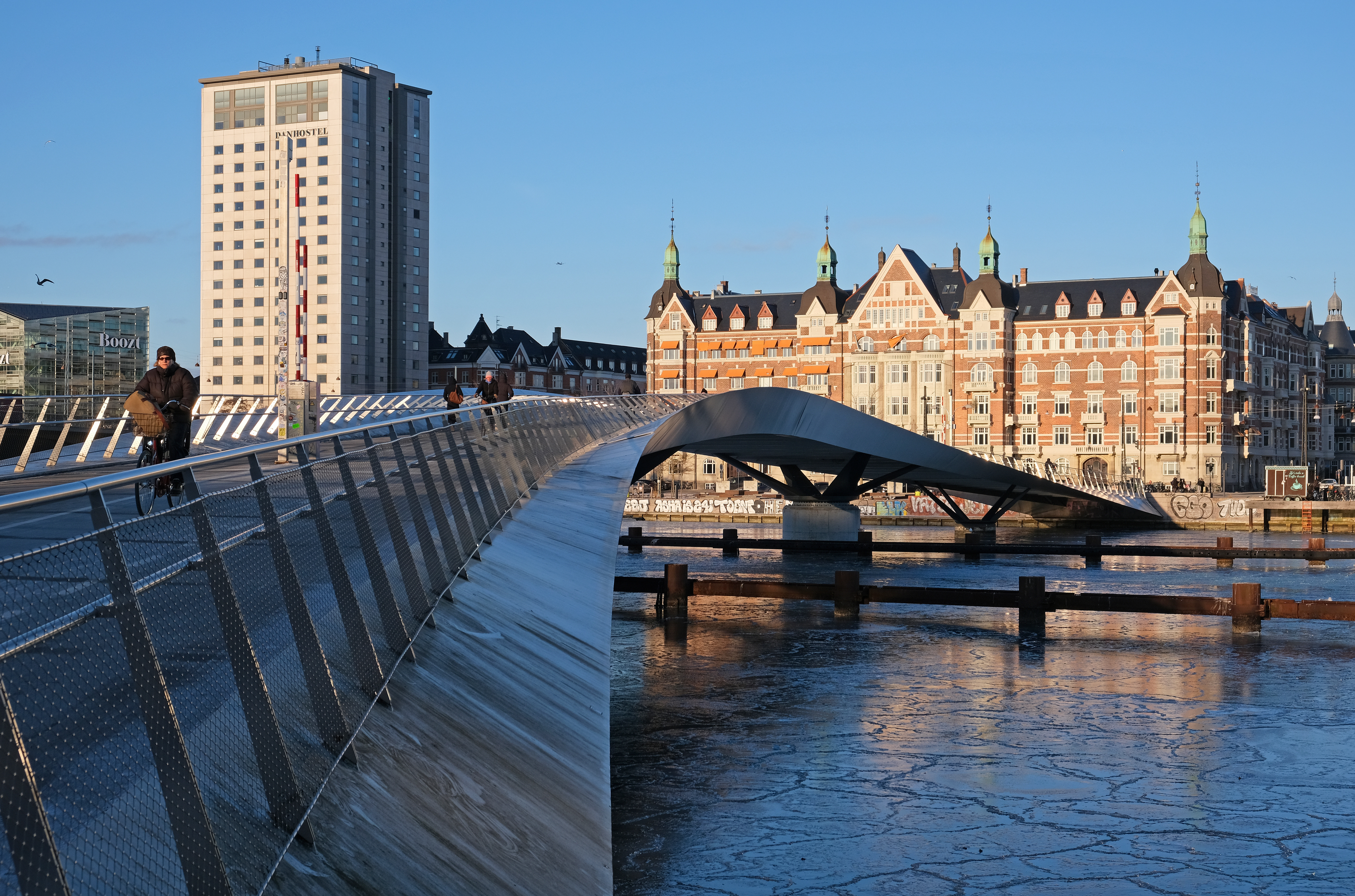
- Lille Langebro
- Coordinates: 55°40′16″N 12°34′47″E
- Crosses: Copenhagen Inner Harbour
- Official name: Lille Langebro
- Owner: Municipality of Copenhagen

Characteristics
- Material: Steel
- Total length: 160 m (520 ft)
- Width: 7 m (23 ft) Total width; 3 m (9.8 ft) pedestrian; 4 m (13 ft) cycle
- Height: 5.4 m (18 ft)
- No. of spans: 5
- No. of lanes: 2

History
- Architect: WilkinsonEyre, Urban Agency
- Contracted lead designer: Lighting Speirs + Major
- Successful competition design: RIBA International Awards for Excellence 2021
- Engineering design by: Buro Happold, Eadon Consulting
- Constructed by: Mobilis Danmark / Hollandia Infra JV
- Fabrication by: Hollandia Infra, Mobilis (joint venture)
- Construction start: March 2017
- Construction end: July 2019
- Construction cost: £9 million (£5,217m²)
- Inaugurated: 14 August 2019

Statistics
- Daily traffic: Pedestrian and cycle

Location
- Interactive map of Little long bridge

Lille Langebro (English: Little long bridge) is a walking and cycling bridge across the Inner Harbour in Copenhagen, Denmark. It is located close to and named after the larger Langebro bridge. It was designed by WilkinsonEyre and Urban Agency and it is classified as a double-swing bridge. The unique visual elements include the twisted and curved design.

== Design ==
There was a competition for the commission to build the Lille Langebro bridge and it was awarded to WilkinsonEyre and Urban Agency in 2015. WilkinsonEyre and Urban Agency's design includes lighting which is hidden in the handrail: the effect is to make the bridge look like a twisted ribbon when it is lit up after dark.

The bridge was designed for bicycles and pedestrians. It is 160 m (520 ft) long and 7 m (23 ft) wide. The bridge is classified as a double-swing bridge based on its sectional design and ability to swing open. It crosses the inner harbour north of Langebro and features an elegant curvature. The bridge is constructed with steel.

== Engineering ==
The bridge has the ability to swing open so that boats may pass. There are two rotating sections which open together. The sections swing open using gravity to move the bridge sections.

According to the engineers at Buro Happold one of the challenges was to get the two horizontally rotating bridge components to come together and lock. Most bridges lock together with pins; but for this bridge the engineers utilized mechanical and hydraulic components that lock the bridge together when closed.

The handrail is made of brushed stainless steel and there is a see-through mesh covering the supports. The bridge is divided into a 3 m (9.8 ft) lane for pedestrians and a 4 m (13 ft) lane for cycles.

== Awards ==
- RIBA International Awards for Excellence 2021

== Gallery ==
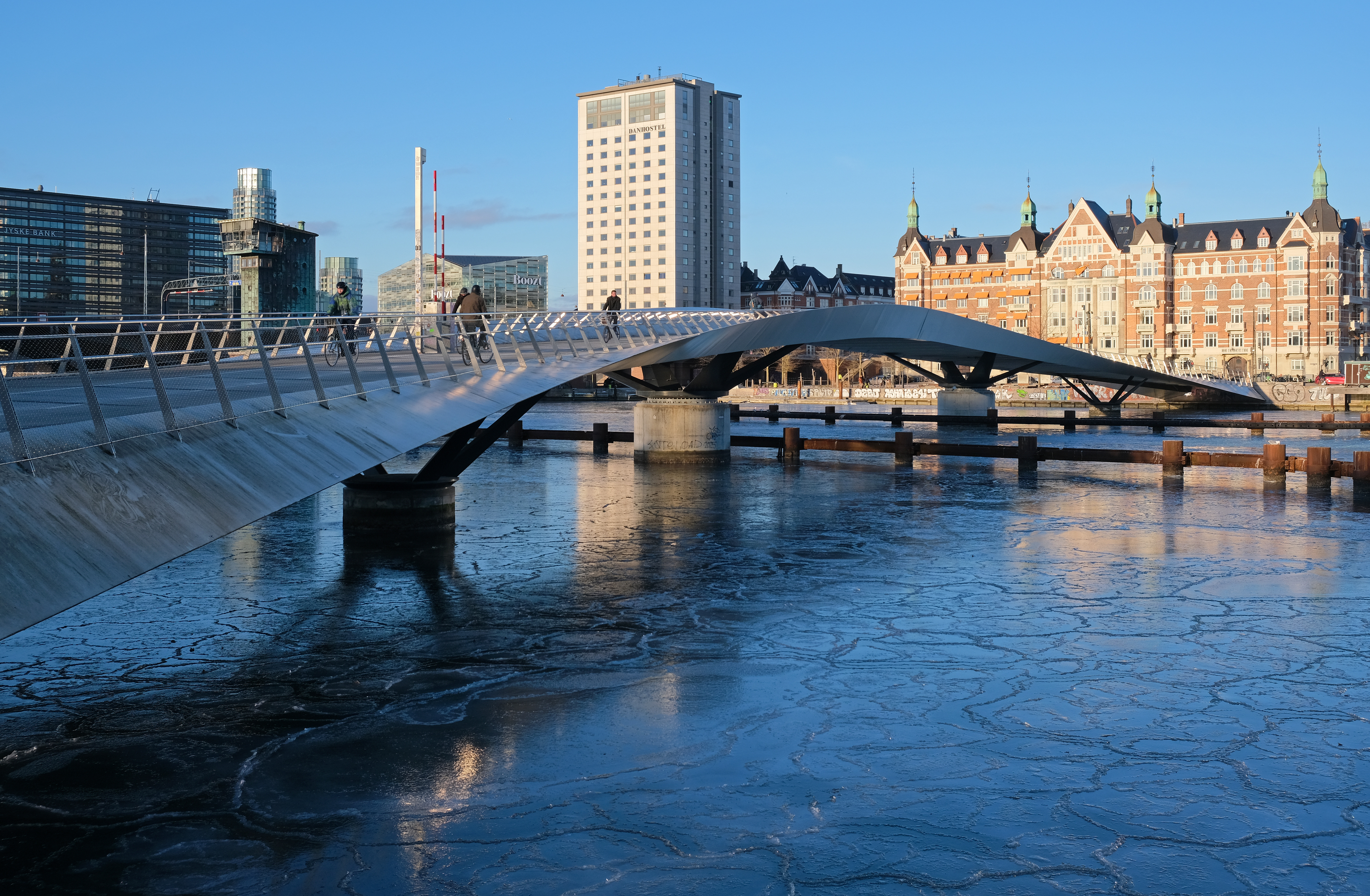

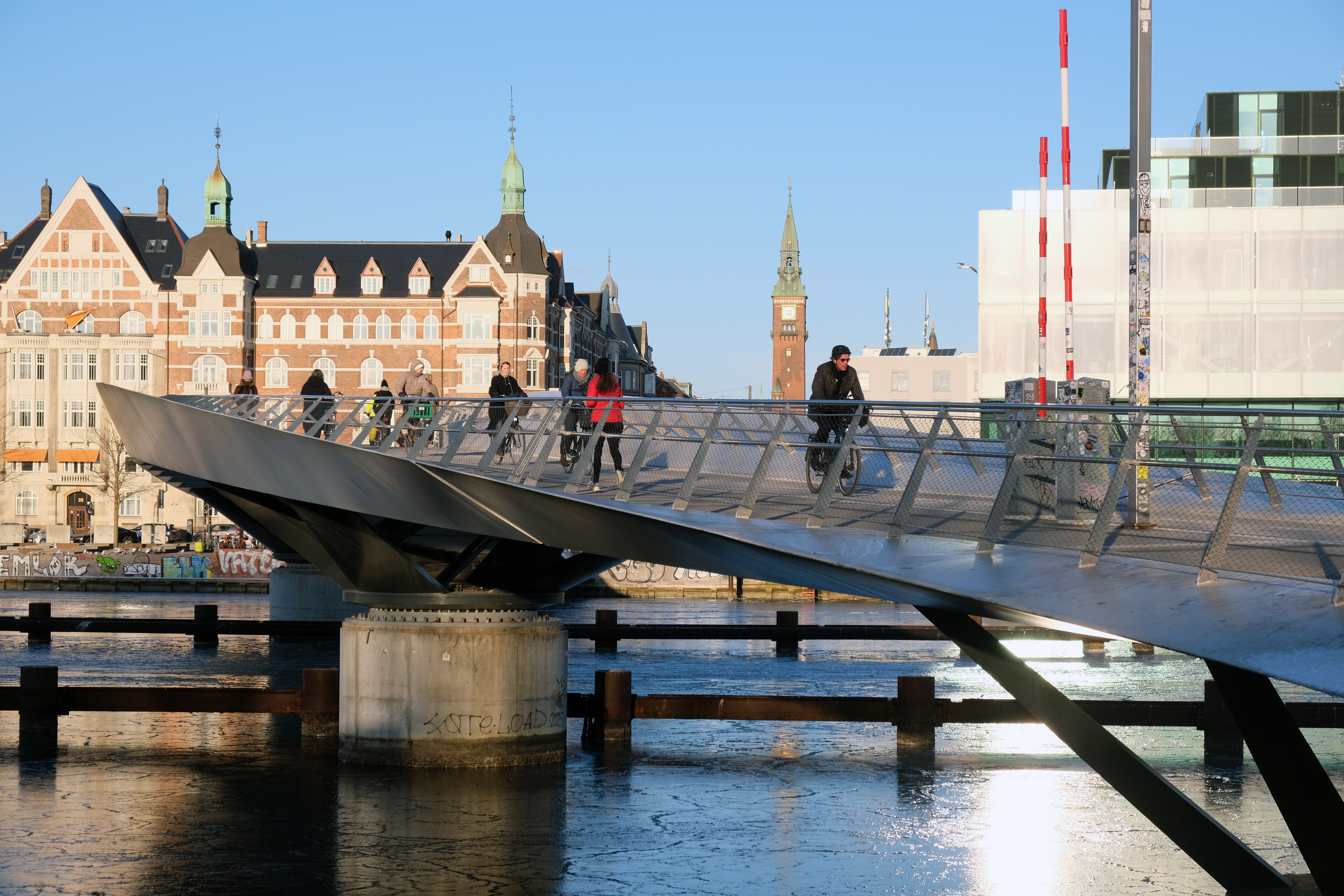

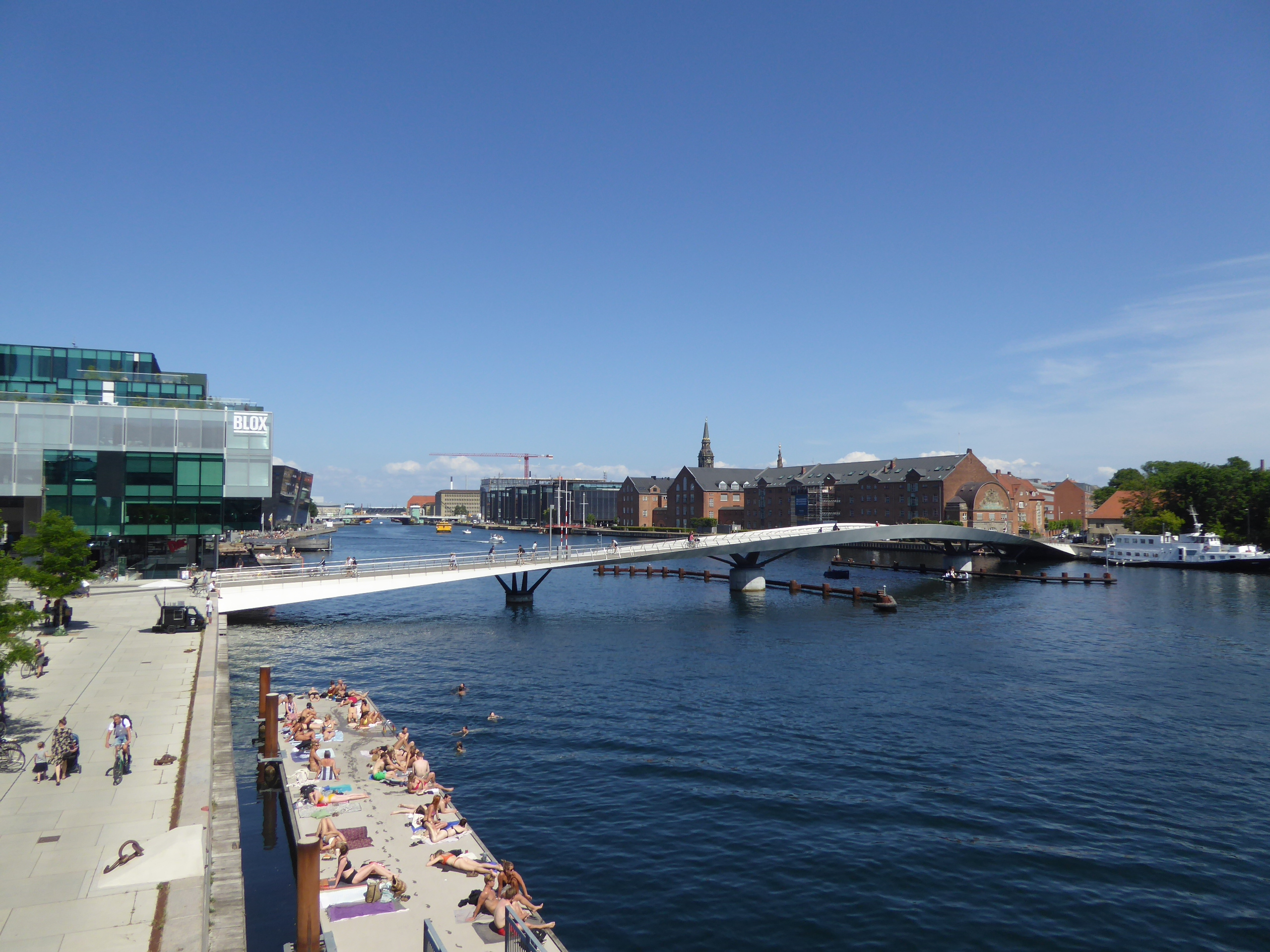

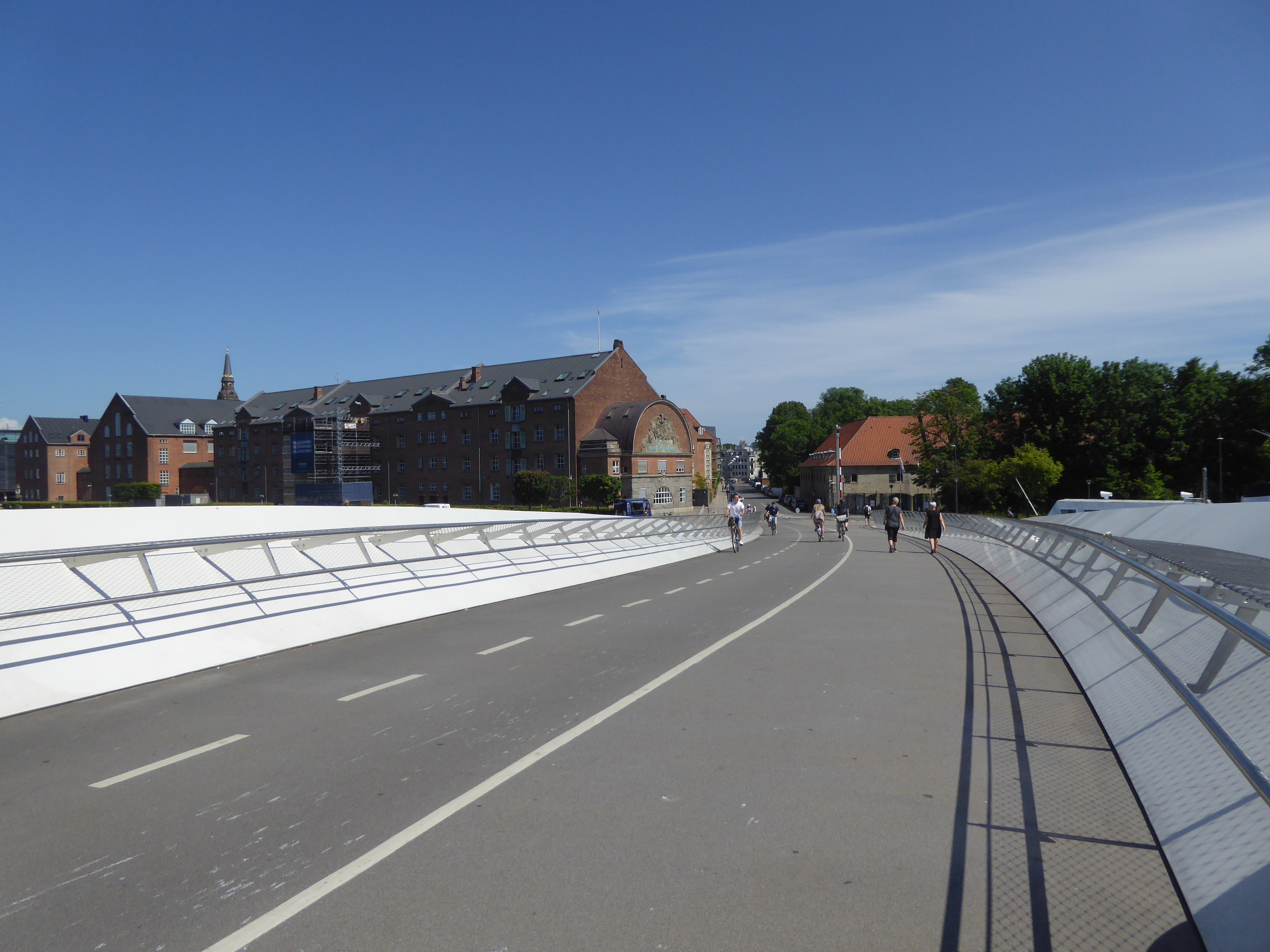

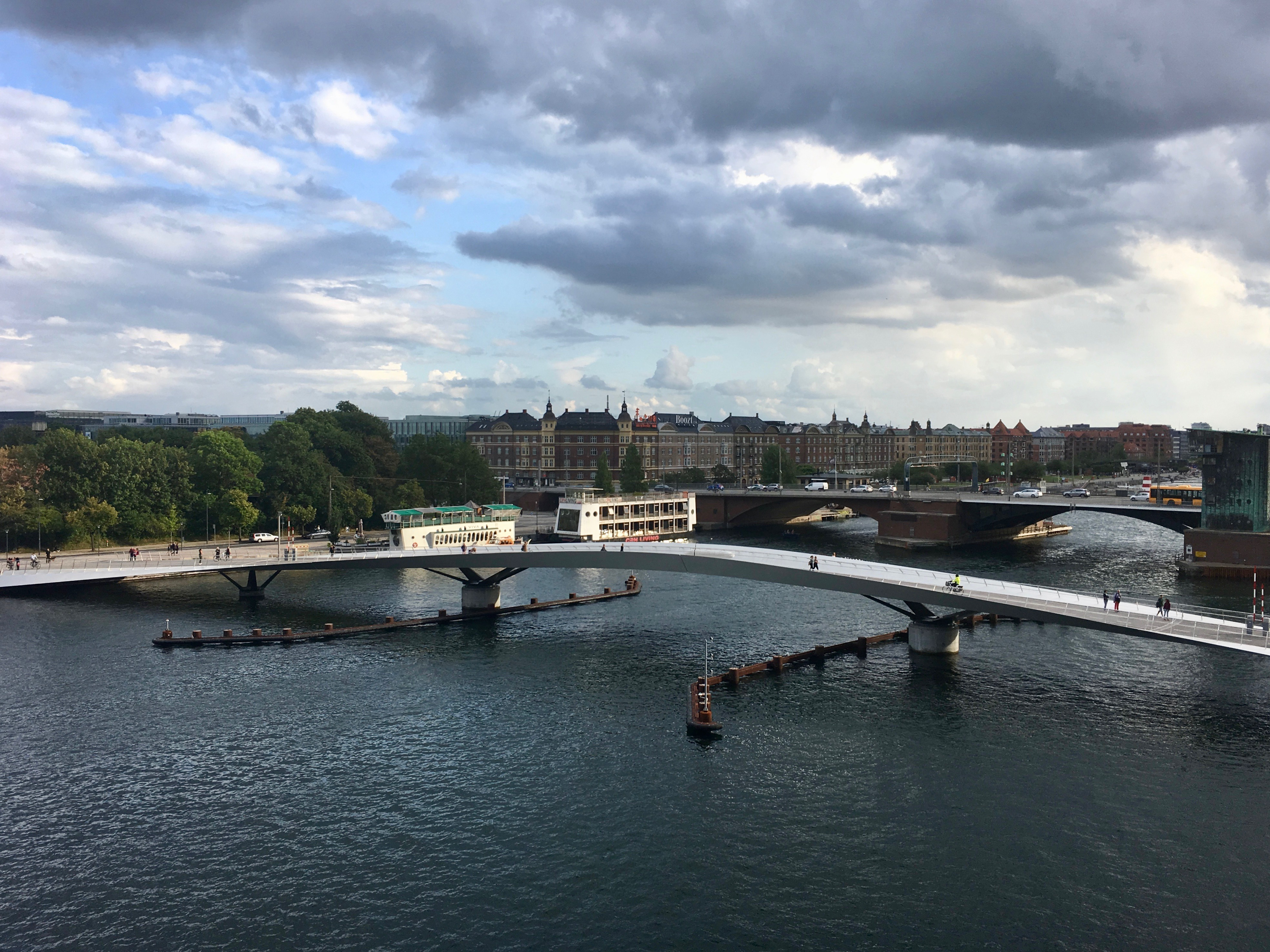
