= Suste Bonnén =

Danish photographer and author

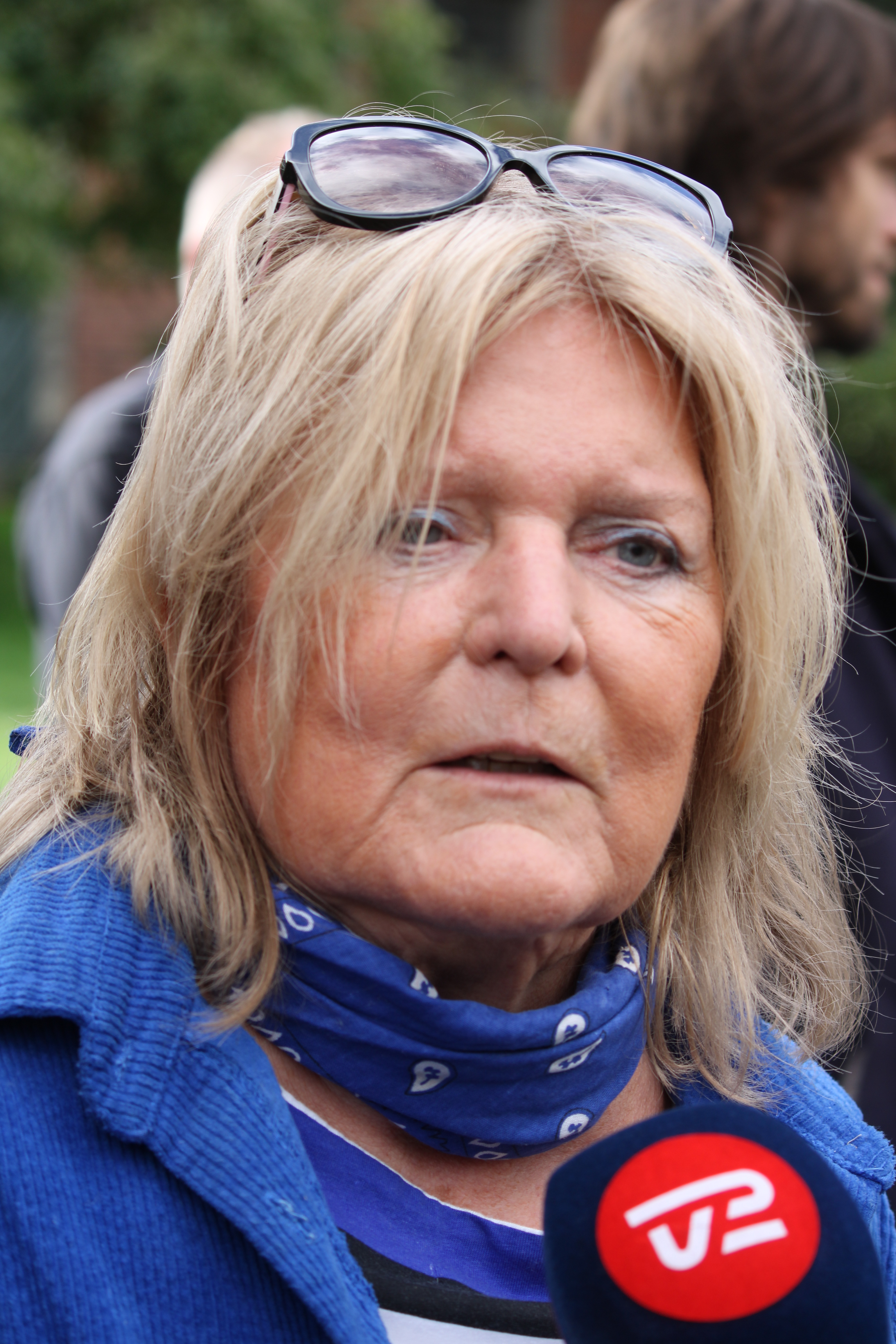
Bonnén in 2025

Suste Bonnén (born 25 October 1948) is a Danish portrait photographer, sculptor and author. She is particularly known for her underwater sculpture group Agnete and the Merman which is installed at the bottom of the Frederiksholm canal in Copenhagen next to Højbro (the high bridge) and Christiansborg Palace (the parliament building). A member of the Bonnén family, a well-known family in Danish art, she is the sister of the sculptor Peter Bonnén and the artist Kaspar Bonnén. She is also the mother of the gonzo journalist Nicolai Frederik Bonnén Rossen.

In November 2018 she was convicted of sharing revenge porn of her ex-husband masturbating. The recipients included his children. The sentence was 20 days in jail, which she did not serve, and a fine of 10,000 Danish krone (US$1,500).

It was her 6th marriage.
