= Højbro =

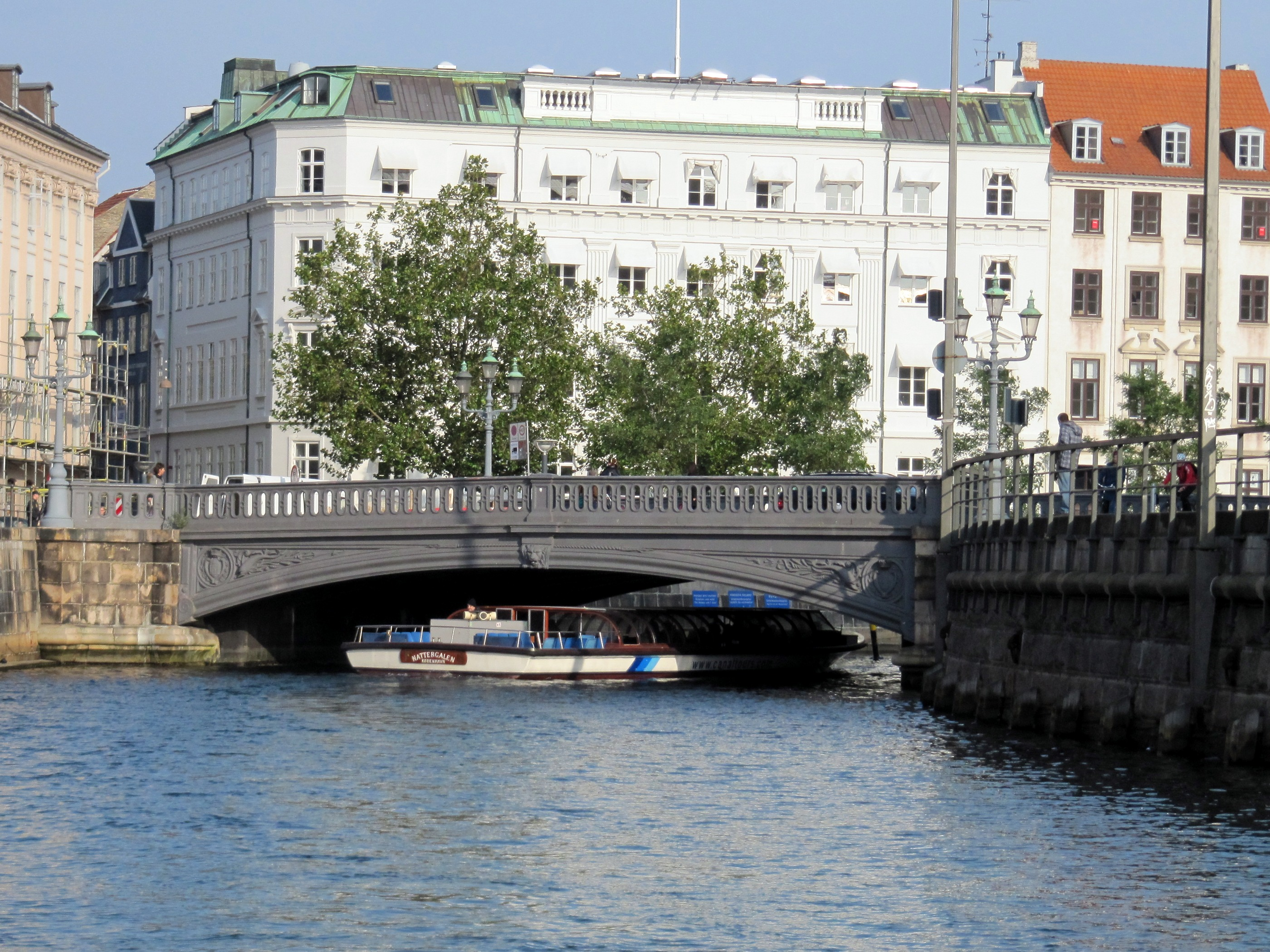
- Højbro with Nordic Council's Building as a backdrop
- Coordinates: 55.6776°N 12.5799°E
- Carries: Motor vehicles, pedestrian and bicycle traffic
- Crosses: Slotsholmens Kanal
- Locale: Copenhagen, Denmark

Characteristics
- Design: Arch bridge

History
- Designer: Vilhelm Dahlerup
- Opened: 1878

Højbro (lit. 'High Bridge') is a bridge in central Copenhagen, Denmark. It connects the small island Slotsholmen with its Christiansborg Palace to the rest of the city centre at the square Højbro Plads which is named after it. The current bridge at the site is from 1878 and was designed by Vilhelm Dahlerup.

== History ==
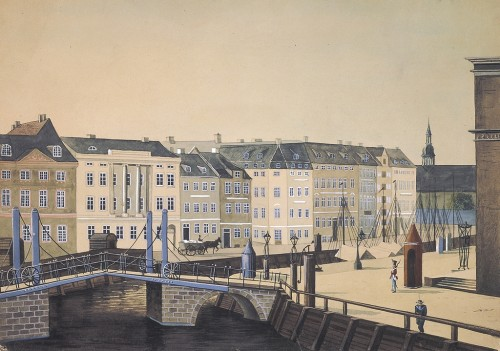
The old Højbro Bridge in 1830 with Ved Stranden in the background

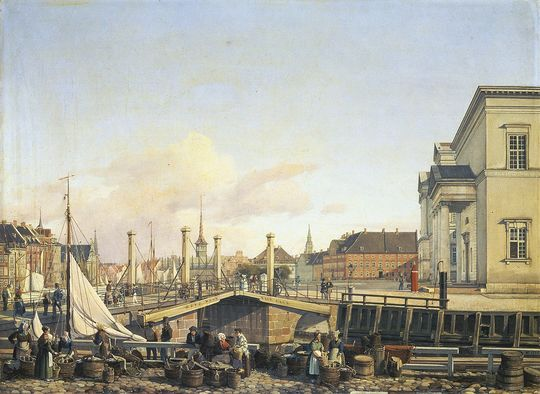
Højbro in 1839 with women selling fish at Gammel Strand, painting by Wilhelm Petersen

There has been a bridge at the site since the Middle Ages. The current bridge was built in 1878 to a design by Vilhelm Dahlerup, who also renewed Holmens Bro and Børsbroen, two other Slotsholmen bridges, which were later dismantled and replaced by other bridges. It was expanded to its current width in the 1960s.

== Design ==
The bridge is made of steel and rests on a granite plinth.

== Agnete and the Merman ==
The underwater bronze sculpture Agnete and the Merman, designed by Suste Bonnén, is placed in the canal next to the bridge. Its subject is taken from a story in Danish folklore.

== See also ==
- Stormbro
