= Frederiksberg Church =

- Frederiksberg Kirke
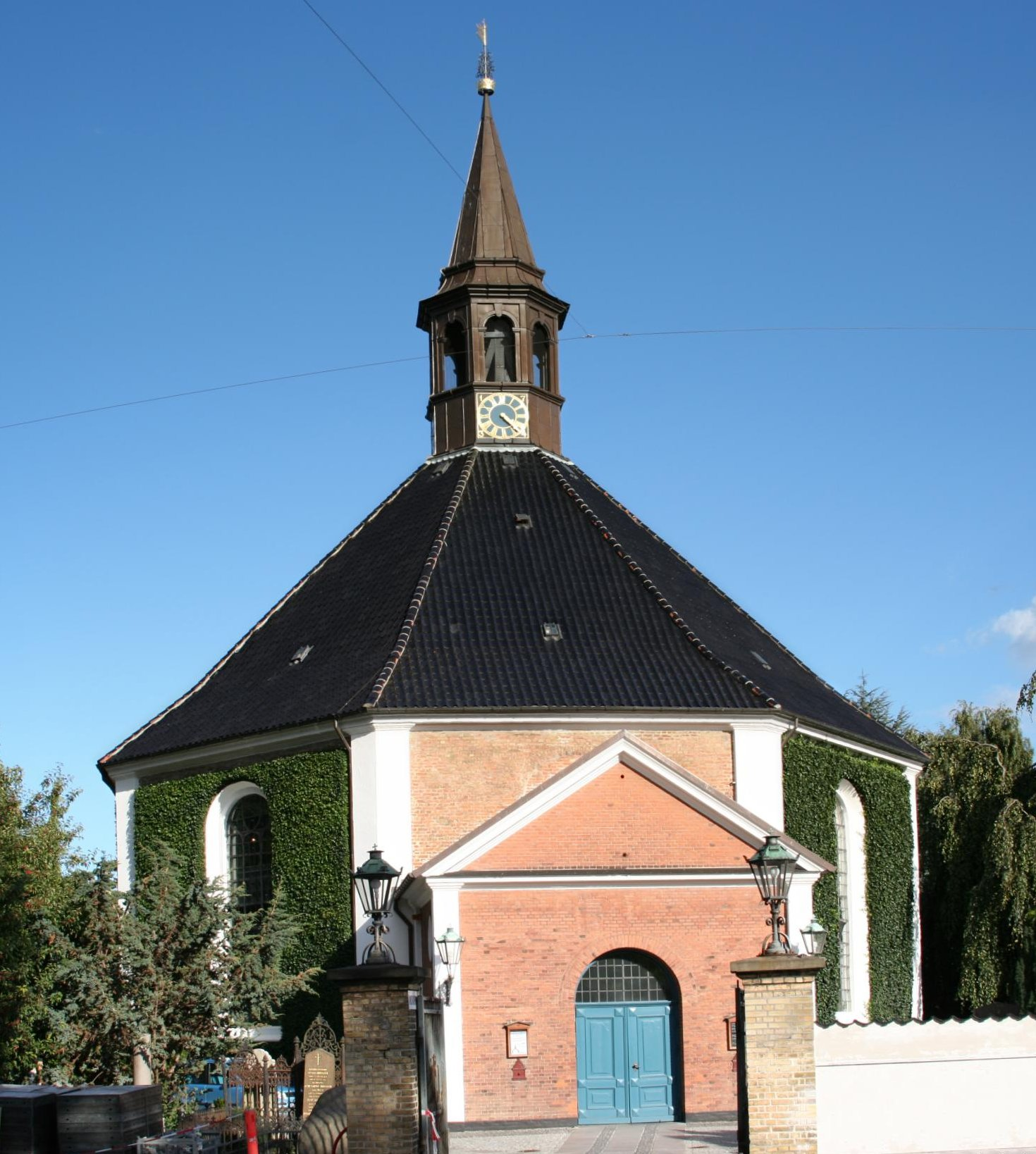
- Frederiksberg Church
- Frederiksberg Church
- 55°40′27.4″N 12°31′58″E
- Location: Frederiksberg, Copenhagen
- Country: Denmark
- Denomination: Church of Denmark

History
- Status: Church

Architecture
- Architect: Felix Dusart
- Architectural type: Church
- Style: Baroque
- Groundbreaking: 1732
- Completed: 6 January 1734

Specifications
- Materials: Brick

Frederiksberg Church (Danish: Frederiksberg Kirke) is the oldest church building in the Frederiksberg district of Copenhagen, Denmark. Completed in 1734, it was built to an unusual octagonal design in Baroque style. It is situated at Frederiksberg Runddel in front of the main entrance to Frederiksberg Gardens, on the corner of Frederiksberg Allé and Pile Allé,

== History ==
=== Earlier churches ===
Frederiksberg was founded when King Christian III transferred 20 Dutch families from Amager to the area, which became known as Ny Hollænderbyen ("New Dutch Town"), or Ny Amager ("New Dutch Town). The residents of this community constructed a small wooden church in 1653 across the street from the present Frederiksberg Church, roughly where the Storm P. Museum stands today. It was burned down by Swedish troops in 1658 during the Assault on Copenhagen in the Second Northern War. After the war, the Dutch community returned to the area but, struck with deep poverty, a new church was not completed until 1681.

After the turn of the century, the area changed dramatically when King Frederick IV built Frederiksberg Palace on a nearby hilltop. The Dutch farmers were forced away from the area which became a fashionable summer destination, from 1710 known as Frederiksberg.

=== The new church ===
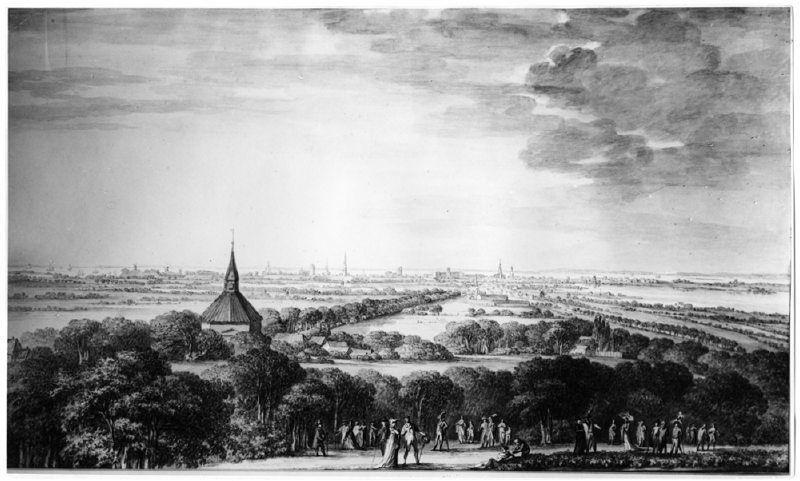
Frederiksberg Church c. 1800

In 1732 it was finally decided to build a new church. The King contributed with 2000 rigsdaler and a piece of land to build it on, and his sister, Princess Sophie Hedevig, donated her entire income from tithe for the year 1732.

The architect Felix Dusart was charged with the design of the new church. He had come to Denmark from the Netherlands after the Copenhagen Fire of 1728 to work on the rebuilding of the city and mainly worked for Philip de Lange.

The church was consecrated on 6 January 1734 by Christian Worm, the Bishop of Zealand, at a ceremony attended by King Christian VI and Crown Prince Frederick (V).

The old church bells were transferred from the old to the new church but later repaired several times and finally completely replaced, save the smallest bell which has partly been preserved. The rest of the old church was sold in an auction on 23 February for the price of 211 rigsdaler and 84 skilling.

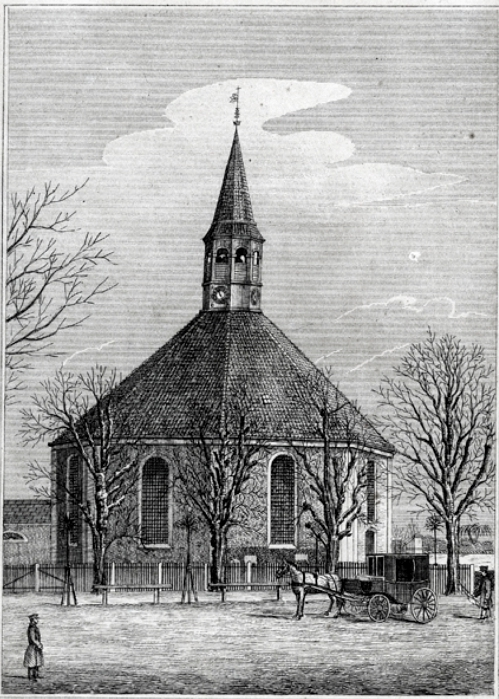
Frederiksberg Church in 1864

In 1736, through a royal resolution, it was decided that the church was to have its own pastor, and the citizens of the Vesterbro suburb were to belong under it. The first pastor was Johannes Kinast (died 1773).

Up through the 19th and 20th century the church was adapted and modernized om several occasions. In 1824 the current rectory was built and in 1865 the church was expanded westward with the porch while the two original entrances, one for men and one for women, are blinded.

In 1868 the church was transferred from state to municipal ownership and in 1898 it became an independent institution.

== Architecture ==
The church is built in Dutch Baroque style and to an octagonal design. The slate roof is from 1876 and replaced a tile roof.

== Furnishings ==
Installed in 1754, the church's first organ had 10 stops and was built by Hartvig Jochum Müller. Its first organist was Joachim Conrad Oehlenschläger, father of the poet Adam Oehlenschläger. The current organ, its third, was built in 1947 by Marcussen & Søn in Åbenrå and had 34 stops, 3 manuals and a pedal.

The combined altar and pulpit is executed by the sculptor Johan Christopher Hübner and carpenter Christian Holfeldt.

The altarpiece from 1841 is painted by Christoffer Wilhelm Eckersberg and depicts the scene from John 17:6-19. According to Dutch reformed tradition it is placed below the pulpit.

There are two memorials in the church, both of which were inaugurated on 16 January 1873. One commemorates soldiers fallen in the Second Schleswig War and the other Adam Oehlenschläger.

== Churchyard ==
Today known as Frederiksberg Ældre Kirkegård (en. Frederiksberg Old Cemetery), the churchyard was established at the same time as the church. It soon became too small and was expanded on a number of occasions to keep pace with the constantly growing population of Frederiksberg.

== Interments ==
For a list of notable interments, see Frederiksberg Ældre Kirkegård#Burials

== See also ==
- Christian's Church
