= List of people on the postage stamps of Denmark =

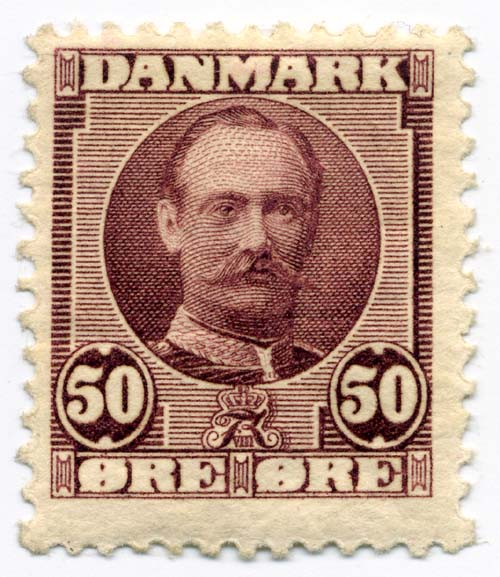
Frederick VIII on a Danish stamp from 1907

Denmark has issued stamps since 1851. The first person to be featured on a Danish stamp was King Christian IX. The years appearing after each name refer to when that person was first featured on a stamp.

This list is complete through early 2003.

Danish West Indies

== A ==
- Nicolai A. Abildgaard (1984)
- Peder Christian Abildgaard (1973)
- Søren Abildgaard (1998)
- Absalon, Archbishop and statesman (1980)
- Alexandrine of Mecklenburg-Schwerin (1939 semi-postal)
- Michael Ancher (1996)
- Hans Christian Andersen (1935)
- Ib Andersen (1991)
- Mogens Andersen (1998)
- Valdemar Andersen (1991)
- Anne-Marie of Denmark Queen consort of Greece (1950 semi-postal)

== B ==
- Otto Bache (1976)
- Jens Bang (1978)
- Poul Anker Bech (2003)
- Wilhelm Bendz (1994)
- Benedikte, Princess of Denmark (1964 semi-postal)
- Vitus Bering (1941)
- Ejler Bille (1987)
- Thorvald Bindesbøll (1996)
- Jens Birkemose (2002)
- Steen Steensen Blicher (1982)
- Karen Blixen (a.k.a. Isak Dinesen) (1980)
- Thor Bogelund (1993)
- Niels Bohr (1963)
- Kay Bojesen (1989)
- August Bournonville (1979)
- Tycho Brahe (1946)
- Georg Brandes (1971)
- Sven Brasch (1991)
- Stig Brøgger (1993)

== C ==
- Georg Carstensen (1962)
- Povl Christensen (1970)
- Christian IV of Denmark (1924)
- Christian V of Denmark (1983)
- Christian IX of Denmark (1904)
- Christian X of Denmark (1913)
- Franciska Clausen (1993)
- Saint Canute IV of Denmark (1985)

== D ==
- Enrico Mylius Dalgas (1966)
- Henning Damgaard-Sorensen|Henning Damgaard-Sørensen (2001)
- Magrius Otto Sophus Count Danneskjold-Samsoe (2001)
- Leon Degand (1988)
- Johan Hendrik Deuntzer (2000)
- Carl aodor Dreyer (1989)

== E ==
- Caroline Ebbeson (1985 semi-postal)
- Christoffer Wilhelm Eckersberg (1983)
- Hans Egede (1971)
- Jacob Christian Hansen Ellehammer (1956)
- Eric of Pomerania (1997)
- Edvard Eriksen (1989)

== F ==
- Martinus William Ferslew (2001)
- Mathilde Fibiger (1971)
- Niels R. Finsen (1960)
- Ole Fick (2003)
- Wilhelm Freddie (1993)
- Frederick V of Denmark (1937)
- Frederick VII of Denmark (1975)
- Frederick VIII of Denmark (1907)
- Frederik IX of Denmark (1948)
- Frederik, Crown Prince of Denmark (1969 semi-postal)
- Lorenz Frølich (1975)

== G ==
- Jacob Gade (1979)
- Vincenzo Galeotti (1986)
- Johan Vilhelm Gertner (1982)
- Harald Giersing (1991)
- N. F. S. Grundtvig (1972)

== H ==
- Vilhelm Hammershoi (1997)
- Constantin Hansen (1989)
- Emil Christian Hansen (1976)
- Peter Hansen (1988)
- Vilhelm Hansen (2002)
- Hanne Hastrup (2002)
- Osvald Helmuth (1999)
- Poul Henningsen (1991)
- Sys Hindsbo (2003)
- Ludvig Holberg (1972)

== I ==
- Bernhard Severin Ingemann (1989)
- Ingrid of Sweden (1941 semi-postal)
- Bodil Ipsen (1989)
- Pieter Isaacsz (1988)

== J ==
- Jacob Christian Jacobsen (1947)
- Robert Jacobsen (1985)
- Georg Jensen (1966)
- Johannes Vilhelm Jensen (1973)
- Frantz Christopher von Jessen (2001)
- Phillip Stein Jönsson (1992)
- Johan Knud Victor Rasmussen (1933)

== K ==
- Preben Kaas (1999)
- Frans Kannik (2002)
- Søren Aabye Kierkegaard (1955, 2013)
- Per Kirkeby (1998)
- Kirsten Klein (2002)
- Thomas Kluge (1999)
- Christen Købke (1989)
- Johan Peter Koch (1994)
- Christen Mikkelsen Kold (1966)
- August Krogh (1980)
- Axel Johannes Krøyer (1990)
- Peder Severin Krøyer (1988)

== L ==
- Niels Lergaard (1995)
- Jørn Larsen (2001)
- Johan Thomas Lundbye (1992)
- Vilhelm Lundstrøm (1993)

== M ==
- Peter Madsen (2002)
- Lise Malinovsky (1999)
- Margaret I of Denmark (1992)
- Margrea II of Denmark (1941 semi-postal)
- Wilhelm Marstrand (1984)
- Andrew Mitchell (1990), introduced a steam engine into Denmark in 1790
- Jorgen Mogensen (1992)
- Flemming Quist Møller (2002)
- Henrik, Prince Consort of Denmark (1967)
- Bernard Law Montgomery (1995)
- Kaj Munk (1981)

== N ==
- Martin Andersen Nexø (1969)
- Asta Nielsen (1996)
- Carl Nielsen (1965)
- Ejnar Nielsen (1966)

== O ==
- Adam Gottlob Oehlenschläger (1979)
- Hans Christian Ørsted (1951)

== P ==
- Dirch Passer (1999)
- Carl-Henning Pedersen (1987)
- Vilhelm Pedersen (1975)
- Kjeld Petersen (1999)
- Robert Storm Petersen (1982)
- Erich Pontoppidan (1998)
- Christian Poulsen (1991)
- Valdemar Poulsen (1969)

== R ==
- Rasmus Rask (1987)
- Helge Refn (1985)
- Poul Reichhardt (1986 semi-postal)
- Poul Reumert (2000)
- Ole Rømer (1944)
- Borchardt Rollufse (1980)
- Jørgen Ryg (1999)

== S ==
- Peter Christian Skovgaard (1992)
- Jens Søndergaard (1995)
- Hans Christian Sonne (1967)
- Nina Sten-Knudsen (2000)
- Niels Stensen (1969)
- Fritz Syberg (1988)

== T ==
- Hans Tausen (1936)
- Andreas Thiele (2001)
- Bertel Thorvaldsen (1938)
- Kurt Trampedach

== U ==
- Arne Ungermann (1991)

== V ==
- Valdemar I of Denmark (1980)
- Hanne Varming (2002)

== W ==
- Liva Weel (1999)
- Alfred Wegener (1994)
- Hans Wegner (1991)
- Edvard Weie (1991)
- Nikoline Werdelin (1992)
- Peter Wessel (1990)
- Jens Ferdinand (1997)
- Bjørn Wiinblad (1986)
- Niels Winkel (1988)
- Ole Woldbye (2003)
- Ole Worm (1988)
- Troels Wörsel (1993)

== Danish West Indies ==
- Christian IX of Denmark (1905)
- Christian X of Denmark (1915)
- Frederick VIII of Denmark (1907)
