= C. & V. Hansen =

Danish comics authors who created "Rasmus Klump"

C. & V. Hansen is the name used by the Danish couple Carla and Vilhelm Hansen to sign their Rasmus Klump comics (in English known as Bruin).

Vilhelm Hansen (6 May 1900 – 23 December 1992) and Carla Hansen (née Jensen; 19 September 1906 – 6 December 2001) were an artistic couple. He was a trained lithographist, while she was a writer. Vilhelm worked mainly as an advertising artist between the two World Wars, and only started making comics and illustrating the tales written by Carla in the 1940s.

Their collaborative comic Rasmus Klump, about the adventures of a bear, a pelican, a penguin, and some other animals, debuted in Denmark on November 17, 1951, as a daily comic strip. It soon became one of the most popular European children comics, being translated and distributed into many languages and countries, mainly by the publishing houses Carlsen Comics and Casterman. In the 1960s, Tove Nørgaard began drawing a comic, continuing to do so until Ole Munk Rasmussen and Paul Arne Kring took over in the 1980s. While they no longer wrote or drew the stories after 1965, it was their names that stayed on the albums.

In 2002, Vilhelm Hansen was the subject of a Danish stamp.

== Publications ==
- De Tidlige Børnebøger, a series of children books from the 1940s and 1950s illustrated by Vilhelm Hansen
- Eventyr, a series of fairy tales written by Carla Hansen in the 1950s
- Rasmus Klump, started in 1951: 36 comic albums and some accompanying books and illustrations
