= Frederiksberg Runddel =

Square in Copenhagen, Denmark

Coordinates: 55.6748°N 12.5319°E

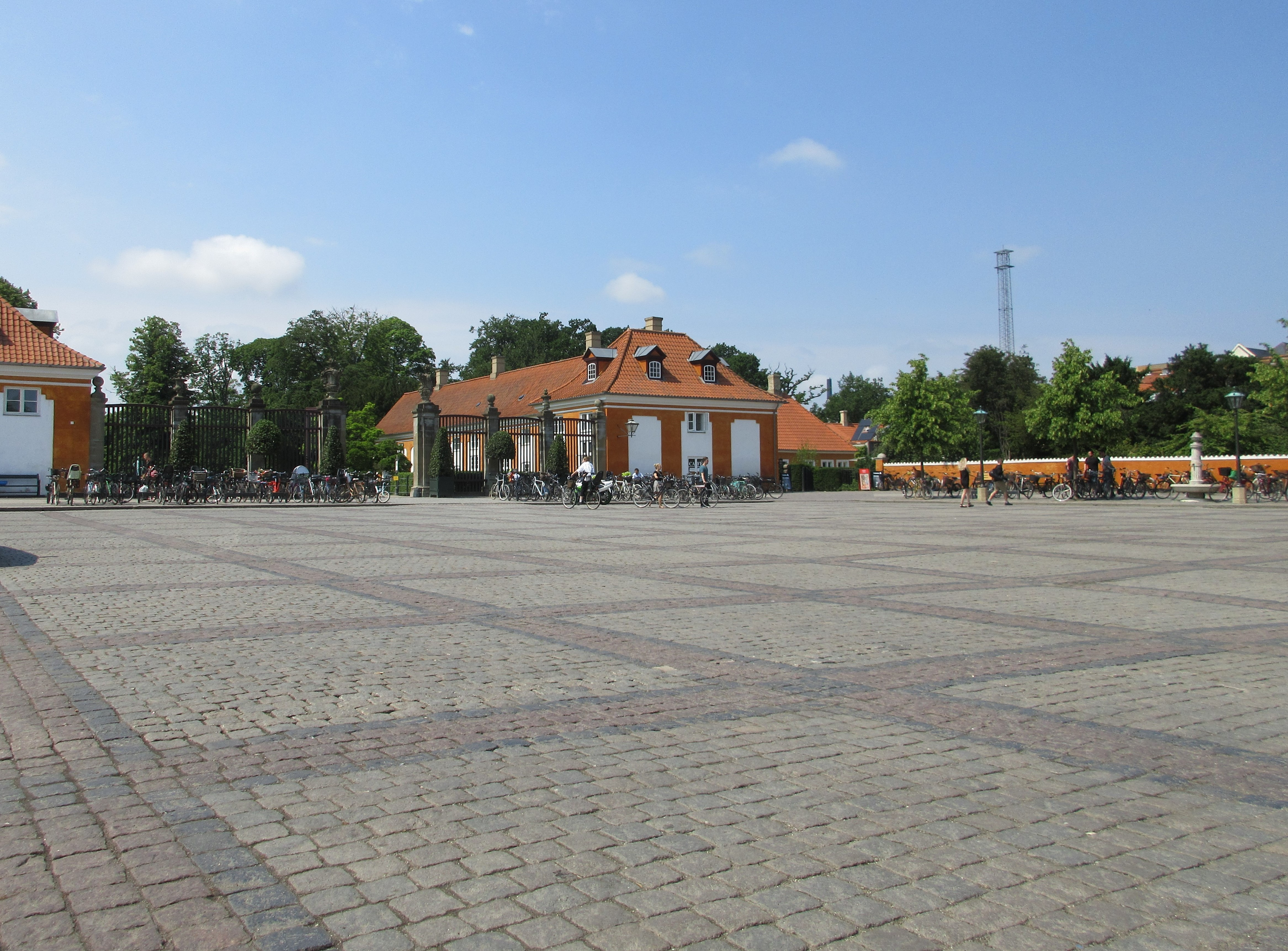
Frederiksberg Runddel

Frederiksberg Runddel (lit. English:Frederiksberg Circus) is a space in front of the main entrance to Frederiksberg Gardens, at the end of Frederiksberg Allé, in the Frederiksberg district of Copenhagen, Denmark.

== History ==
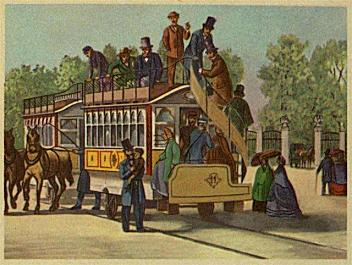
Changing horses at Frederiksberg Runddel, 1863

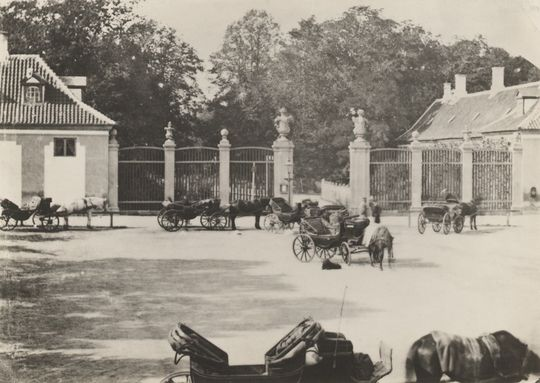
Horse carriages in front of the main entrance to Frederiksberg Gardens

Frederiksberg Runddel, which in spite of its name has never been particularly round, was established around 1670, when Queen Sophie Amalie had a small summer residence built on the site where the main entrance to Frederiksberg Gardens now stands. The three-winged property became known as the Prince' House (da. Prinsens Gård) after it was passed on to Crown Prince Frederik (IV) who later, after his ascent to the throne, replaced it with Frederiksberg Palace on a nearby hilltop.

Nicolai Eigtved converted the south wing to an orangerie in 1744. After the main wing burnt down in 1753, it was not rebuilt, but instead the main entrance to Frederiksberg Have was established in 1755 between the two surviving wings.

On 22 October 1863, the English-owned Copenhagen Railway Company opened the first tram line in Copenhagen which ran from Frederiksberg Runddel along Frederiksberg Allé and present day Strøget to Sankt Annæ Plads in the city centre.

== Buildings and features ==
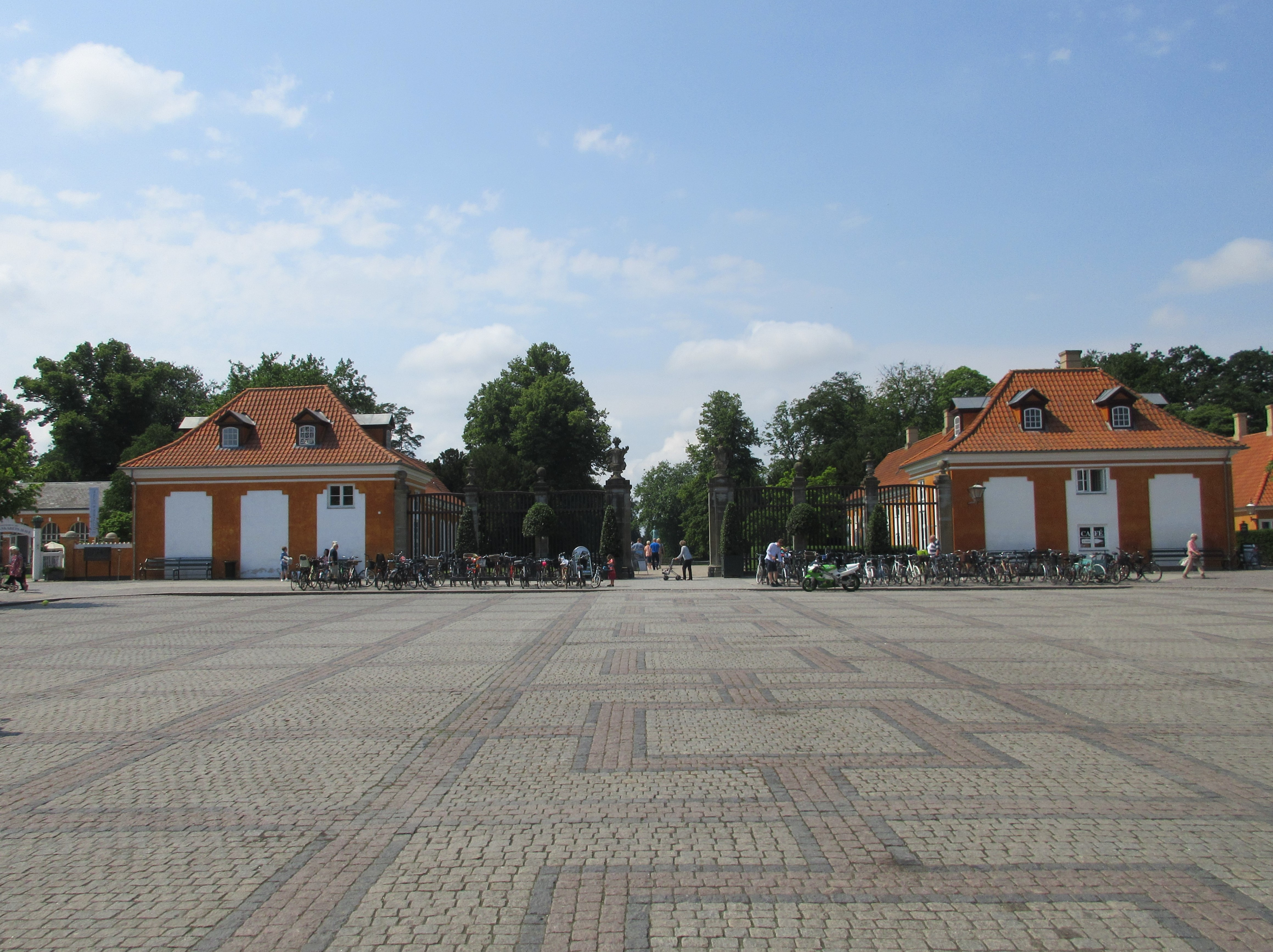
The main entrance to Frederiksberg Gardens

=== Park main entrance ===
The entrance gate to Frederiksberg Gardens was built in 1755 after the fire two years earlier. It was designed by Lauritz de Thurah who had become general master builder after Eigtved's death. The vases at the top of the two sandstone pillars were executed by the sculptor Johann Friedrich Hännel.

=== Storm P. Museum ===
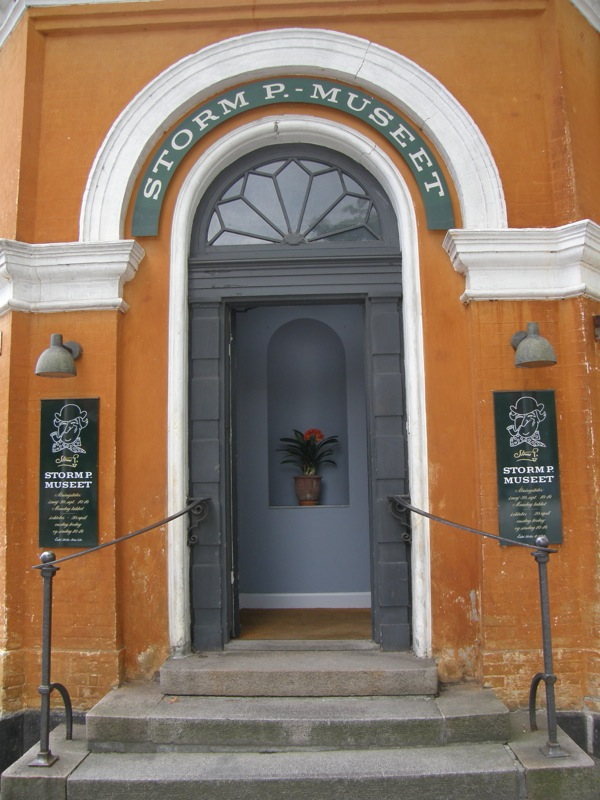
Storm P. Museum, entrance

The Storm P. Museum, located on the corner of Pile Allé, is dedicated to the Danish humorist, cartoonist, painter and actor, Robert Storm Petersen, who is popularly known as Storm P.. Originally the local police station, this building from 1886 later served as the office of the local burials administration before it was converted into a museum.

=== Royal Danish Horticultural Society's Garden ===
The Horticultural Society's Garden was originally located further down Frederiksberg Allé but moved to its current premises in 1882. Before that, the site was part of the palace garden's nursery and vegetable gardens.

== The square today ==
Due to its peaceful and picturesque setting, the space is often used for various events or fairs. In winter, it features an open-air ice-skating rink.

== See also ==
- Sankt Thomas Plads
