= Rasmus Klump =

Danish comic series

- Main character with the series logo
- Author: Carla Hansen
- Illustrator: Vilhelm Hansen
- Current status/schedule: Running
- Launch date: 17 November 1951
- Alternate name(s): Rasmus nalle (Swedish) Petzi (French); Bruin (English) Pol (Dutch)
- Publisher(s): Carlsen, Casterman
- Genre: For children
- Original language: Danish

Rasmus Klump (translates to Rasmus Lump or Erasmus Lump) is a Danish comic strip series for children created in 1951 by the Danish wife-and-husband team Carla and Vilhelm Hansen. The series was translated into a number of foreign languages, in some of which the title character Rasmus was renamed Petzi, Pol, Rasmus Nalle or other variations.

The series tells the adventures of the bearcub Rasmus Klump and his friends: Pingo (a penguin), Pelle (a pelican), Pildskadden (a turtle), Skæg (a seal) and others. Always dressed in red dungarees with white polka dots, Rasmus Klump travels the world on board his boat Mary, which he builds with his friends in the first episode.

== Style ==
The comic strips do not make use of speech balloons but rather captions, whose humour, as well as the affectionately drawn pictures, contributed greatly to the popularity of the series. It can be classified as a text comic, although there is a parallel humor strip version of the series, where speech balloons are used frequently.

== History ==
Rasmus Klump began as a newspaper strip in Berlingske Aftenavis (now Weekendavisen) on 17 November 1951 and was successfully published in translation worldwide, with total sales running over 30 million. When fans appealed for more, the Hansens began publishing storylines in book form.

In 1998, Carla Hansen created the Rasmus Klump Prisen (Rasmus Klump Award) for Danish people that had followed the virtues exhibited by the comic series. The winner receives an original comic strip, and 25,000 Danish kroner. Winners include Michael Laudrup and Frederik, King of Denmark.

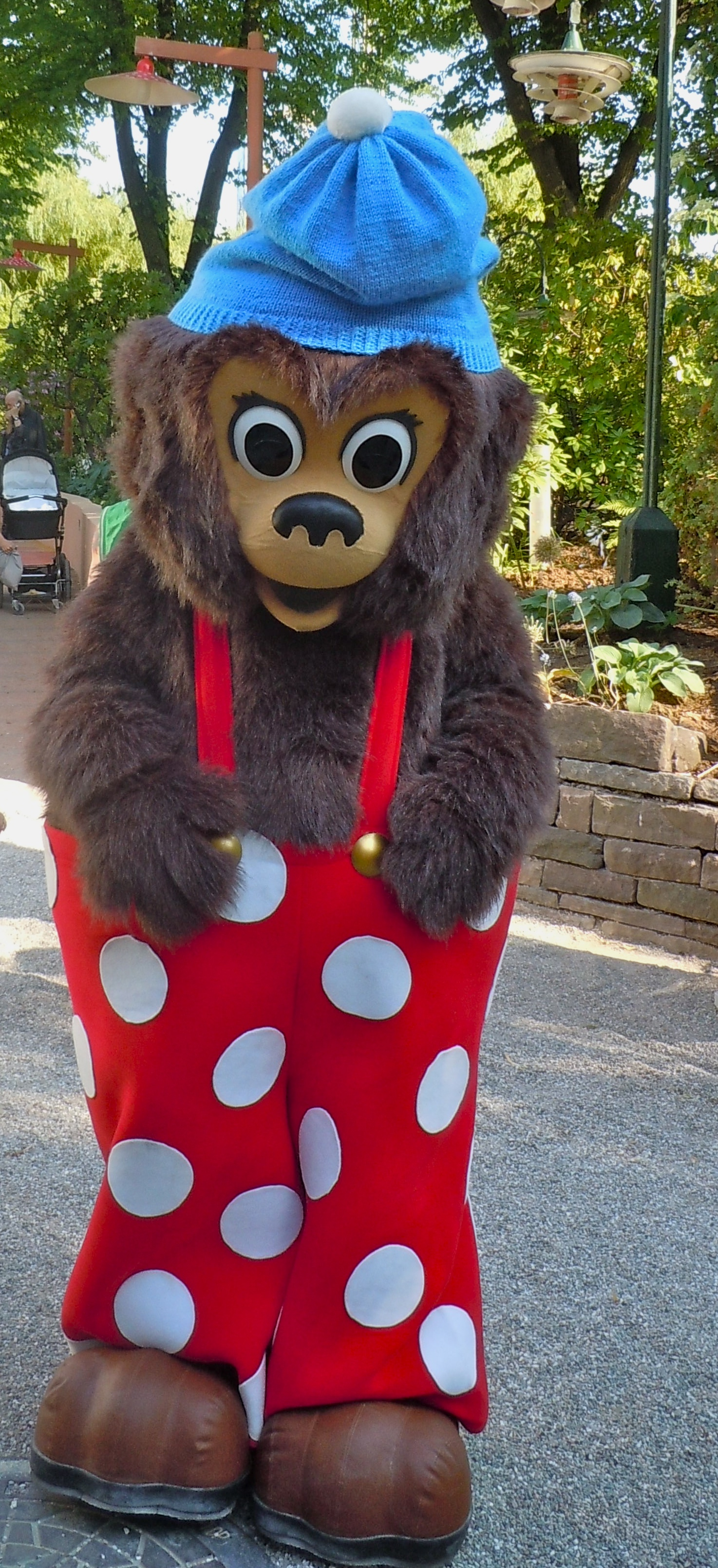
A costume character of Rasmus Klump seen at Tivoli, Copenhagen

On 17 November 2001, the comic reached its fiftieth anniversary, and the occasion was marked in Denmark by the issue of a commemorative stamp.

Rasmus Klump appeared in English as Bruin in the Evening Times, where he had his own club.

The comic has also, on several occasions, been turned into animation. The first time was allegedly a low-budget Danish production of 13 episodes in the 60's, known from a contract between Statens Filmcentral and Illustrationsforlaget, although not much is known about this production. In 1984, a new series of 13 episodes was produced, as a deal between PIB Copenhagen and Casterman in Belgium, and was animated by an American living in Japan. It was still low-budget, but was a reasonable commercial success, being shown on several television channels worldwide. In the 1990s, yet another series materialised as 26 5-minute episodes for two periods, 1996 and 1998. This was a European co-production involving Danish animation veterans A. Film.

An iPad application has also been created featuring Rasmus Klump (2011).

== Name ==
Rasmus Klump is a proper name; "Rasmus" comes from the older strip "Strudsen Rasmus" (Rasmus the Ostrich), which Rasmus Klump replaced; "Klump" was added to give him a family name, and comes from a dog the Hansens knew; the name "Bjørnen Rasmus" (Rasmus the Bear) was originally suggested.

Rasmus Klump is not to be confused with Bamse, a well-known Swedish cartoon figure.

=== Translations ===
- Bamse or Bamse Bjørn in Norwegian
- Barnaby Bear in English (Random House: albums "Barnaby Bear builds a boat" and "Barnaby Bear visits the farm")
- Bruin in English (Evening Times: albums "The Bruin Story" and "Bruin's Adventures at Sea")
- Bundle is also used in some editions
- Pechi in Spanish
- Petzi in French (Casterman), German (Carlsen Comics), Italian, Portuguese, and Vietnamese
- Pol in Dutch (Casterman)
- Rasmus Klumpur in Icelandic
- Rasmus Nalle in Finnish and Swedish (Weilin+Göös)
- Rasmus Tøppur in Faroese
- Pipi xiong (皮皮熊) in Chinese
- Miś Poldek in Polish
