= Storm P. Museum =

Museum about Robert Storm Petersen in Denmark

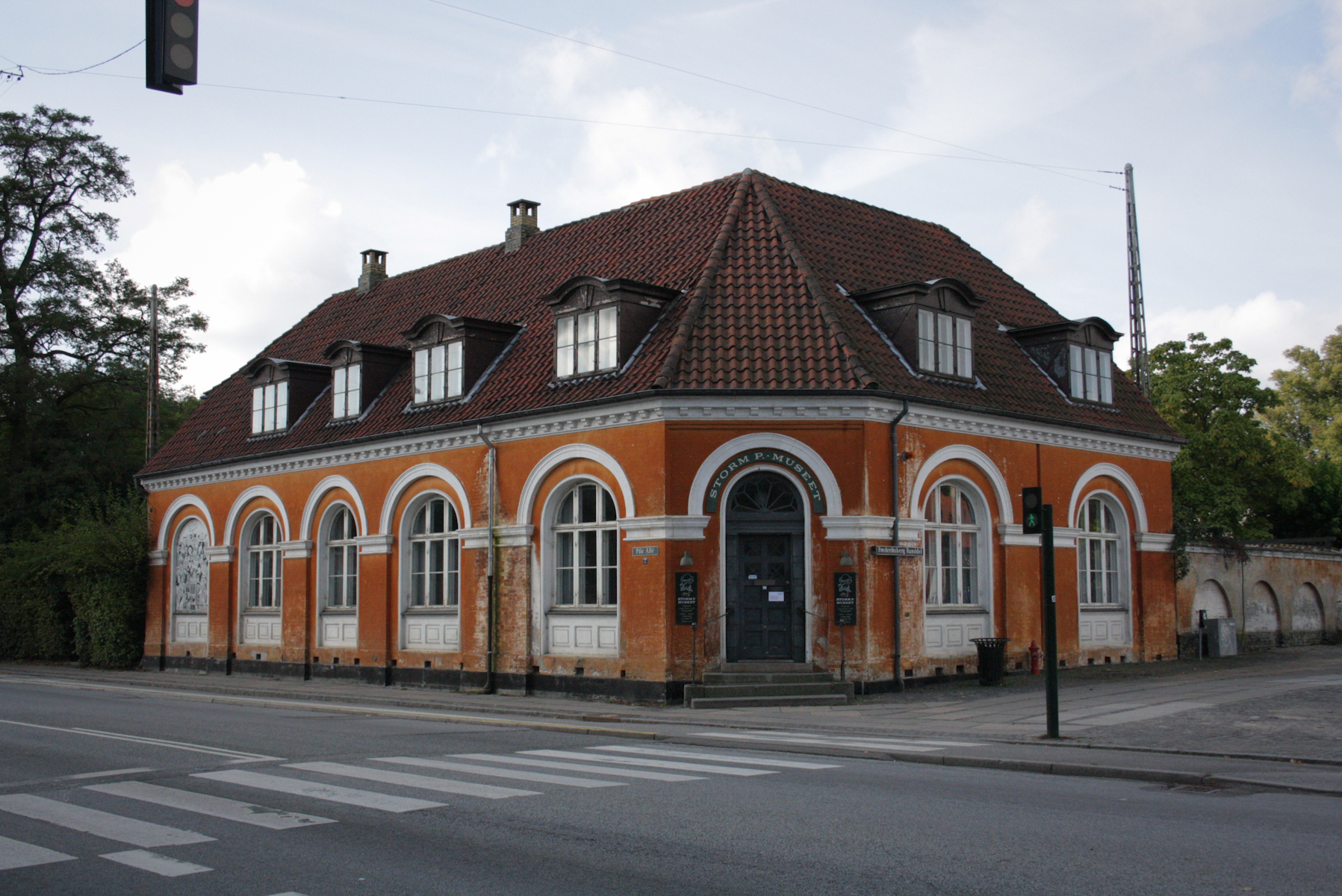
- The museum
- Established: 1977
- Location: 58 Frederiksberg Runddel, Frederiksberg; Copenhagen, Denmark
- Coordinates: 55°40′28″N 12°31′55″E
- Director: Iben Overgaard
- Website: frederiksbergmuseerne.dk

The Storm P. Museum, in Copenhagen, Denmark, is a biographical museum dedicated to the life and oeuvre of Danish humorist Robert Storm Petersen, popularly known as Storm P. In addition to his cartoons, the museum also displays his paintings, both oils and watercolours, and covers other aspects of his life, time and many-sided talent, as well as his extensive collection of smoking pipes and his studio which has been reconstructed on the first floor. The ground floor is used for special exhibitions. In connection with a renovation in 2012, the museum has broadened its profile to include humor, satire and cartoons more generally.

The museum is based in a former police station, part of the listed complex of buildings surrounding Frederiksberg Runddel opposite the main entrance to Frederiksberg Gardens in Frederiksberg.

== History ==
=== Site history ===
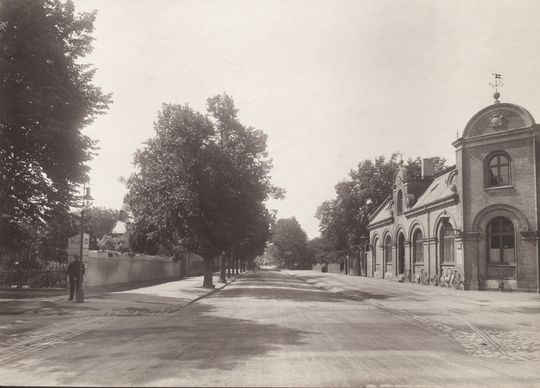
The police station in the 1920s, before the design was altered

The building was constructed in the mid-1880s as Frederiksberg's first police station. It originally stood in blank, brownish-yellow brick and featured a prominent gable at the corner. The local police force left the building in 1919 when a new police station was inaugurated at Howitzvej, just north of Frederiksberg Gardens, as part of a complex which also included Frederiksberg Courthouse and a new fire station.

In the mid-1920s, the building became home to Frederiksberg Funeral Services (Frederiksberg Begravelsesvæsen). The gable was removed and the walls dressed in the current yellow colour to match the other buildings at the entrance to Frederiksberg Gardens.

=== The museum ===
The Storm P Museum took over the building in 1977 but it is still owned by the state. It was refurbished in the winter of 2011–2012.

== Storm P. exhibition ==
The Storm P. exhibition is on the first floor; one of the rooms is a reconstruction of his studio.

The museum's collection of his cartoons and other drawings comprises more than 30,000 works, although only a small and changing selection of them are on display. The collection was digitized in connection with the 2012 renovation and it is now possible to explore it on iPads made available by the museum.

Storm P.'s interest in painting began during a visit to Paris in 1906 where he was struck by the Modernist and in particular Expressionist art that he saw, as well as by the art cabarets and the Bohemian life style. Many of his paintings from this period depict Parisian nightlife. Edvard Munch, Henri de Toulouse-Lautrec and James Ensor were among his inspirations as a painter.

Storm P.'s collection of smoking pipes consists of approximately 450 pieces. The collection began with his own pipes, then he requested pipes from his closest friends; these personal memorabilia were later supplemented with smoking utensils of prominent cultural figures. His collection diversified to include clay pipes, long pipes, and intricately carved Meerschaum pipes. The pipes are on display in the Baroque cabinets which Storm P. acquired for the purpose. A minor selection of the more notable pieces have been moved to showcases in connection with the expansion of the museum.
