= Robert Storm Petersen =

Danish cartoonist, writer and illustrator (1882–1949)

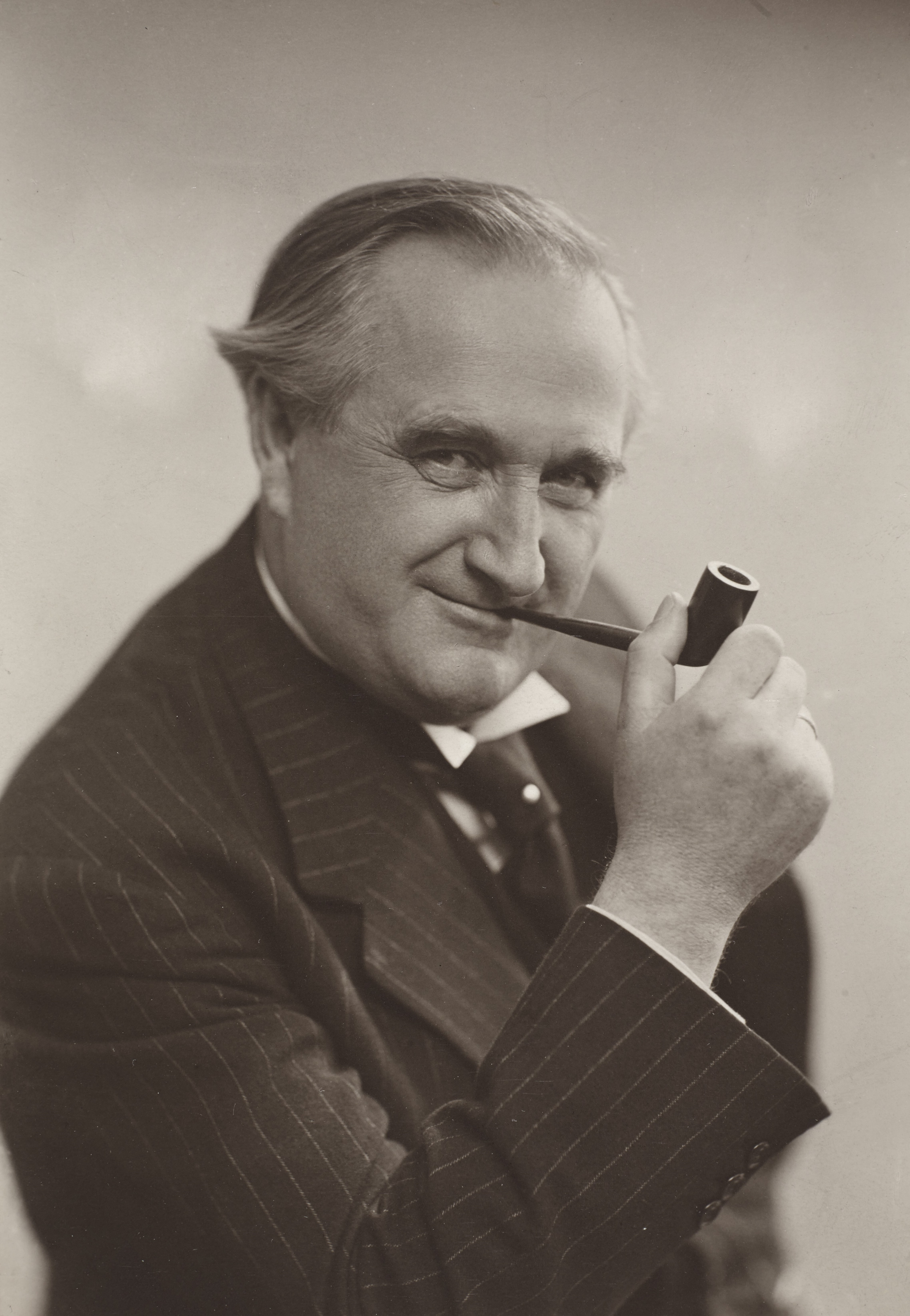
- (1938)
- Born: Robert Storm Petersen; 19 September 1882; Valby, Denmark
- Died: 6 March 1949 (aged 66); Frederiksberg, Denmark
- Resting place: Frederiksberg Ældre Kirkegård
- Other name: Storm P
- Occupations: cartoonist, writer, animator, illustrator
- Spouses: Lydia Sørensen (m. 1913; died 1924) Ellen Jacobsen (m. 1925)

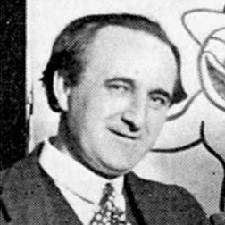
Robert Storm Petersen ca 1913.

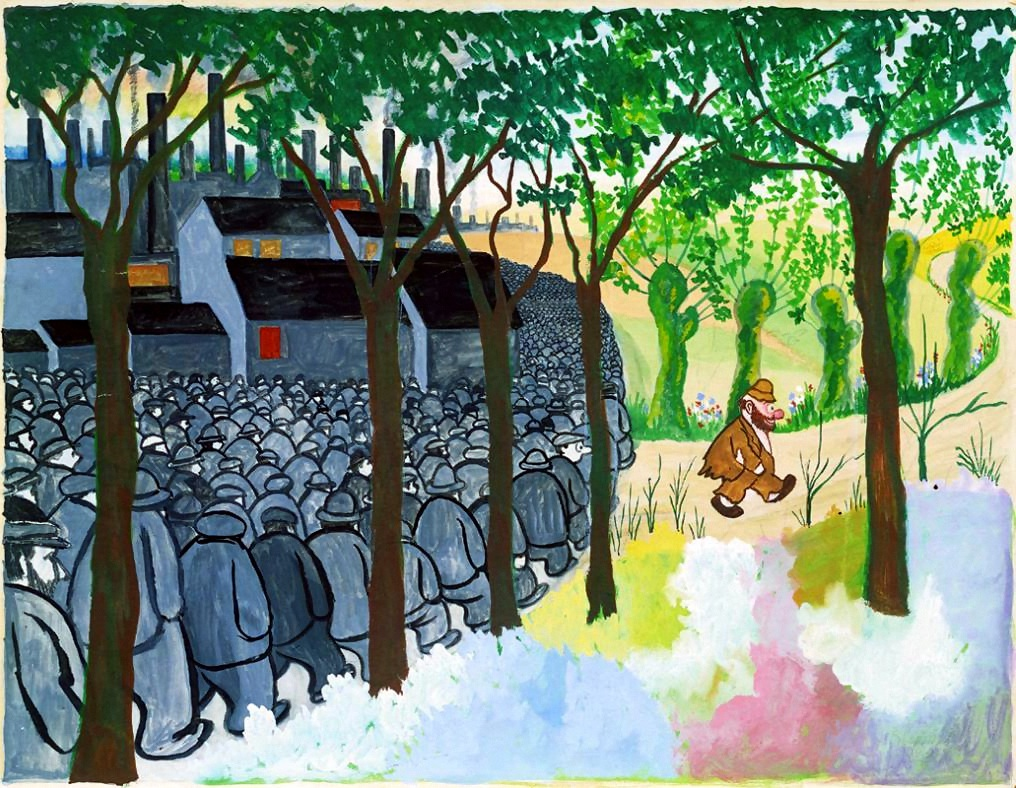
Back to Nature

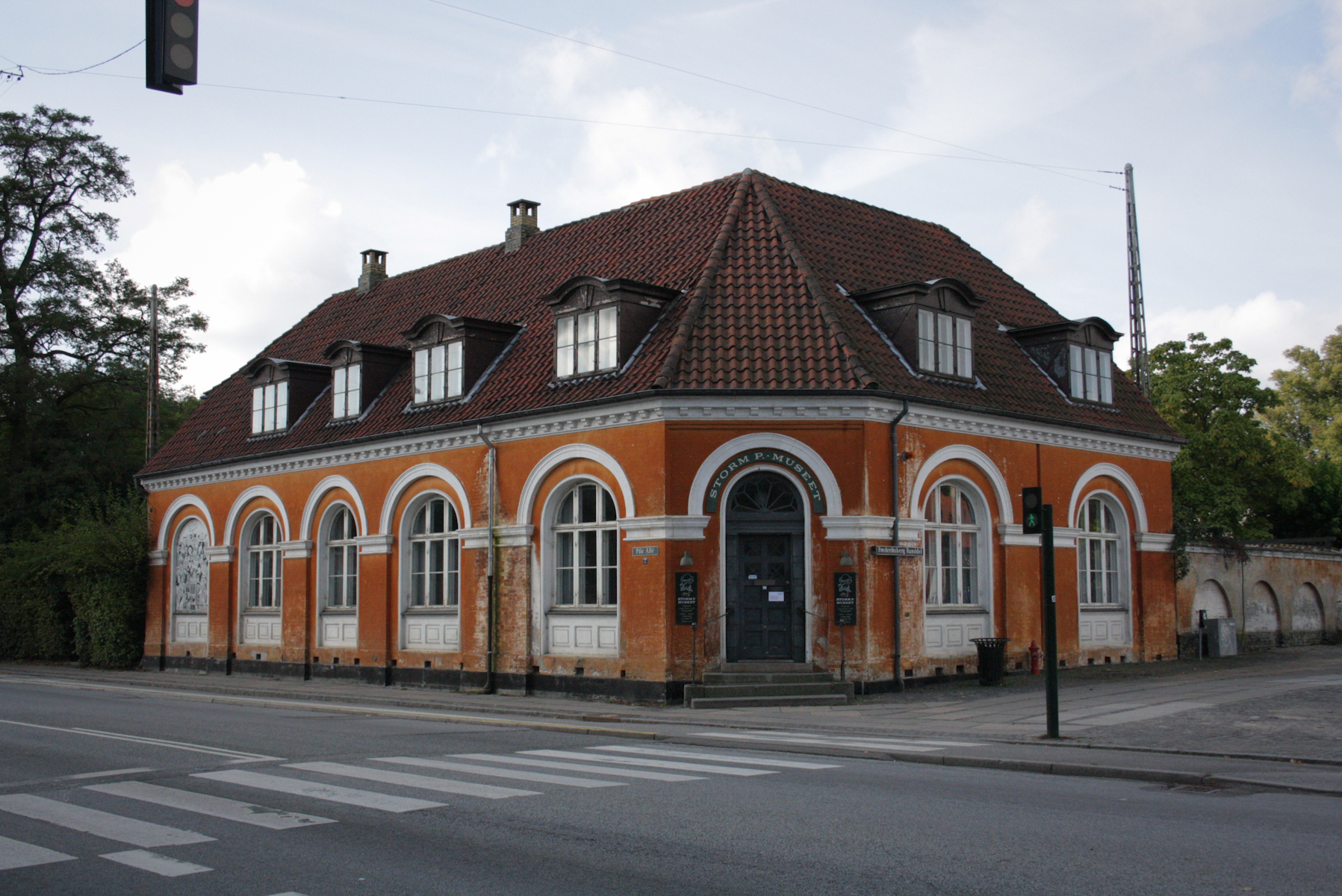
Storm P. Museum at Frederiksberg

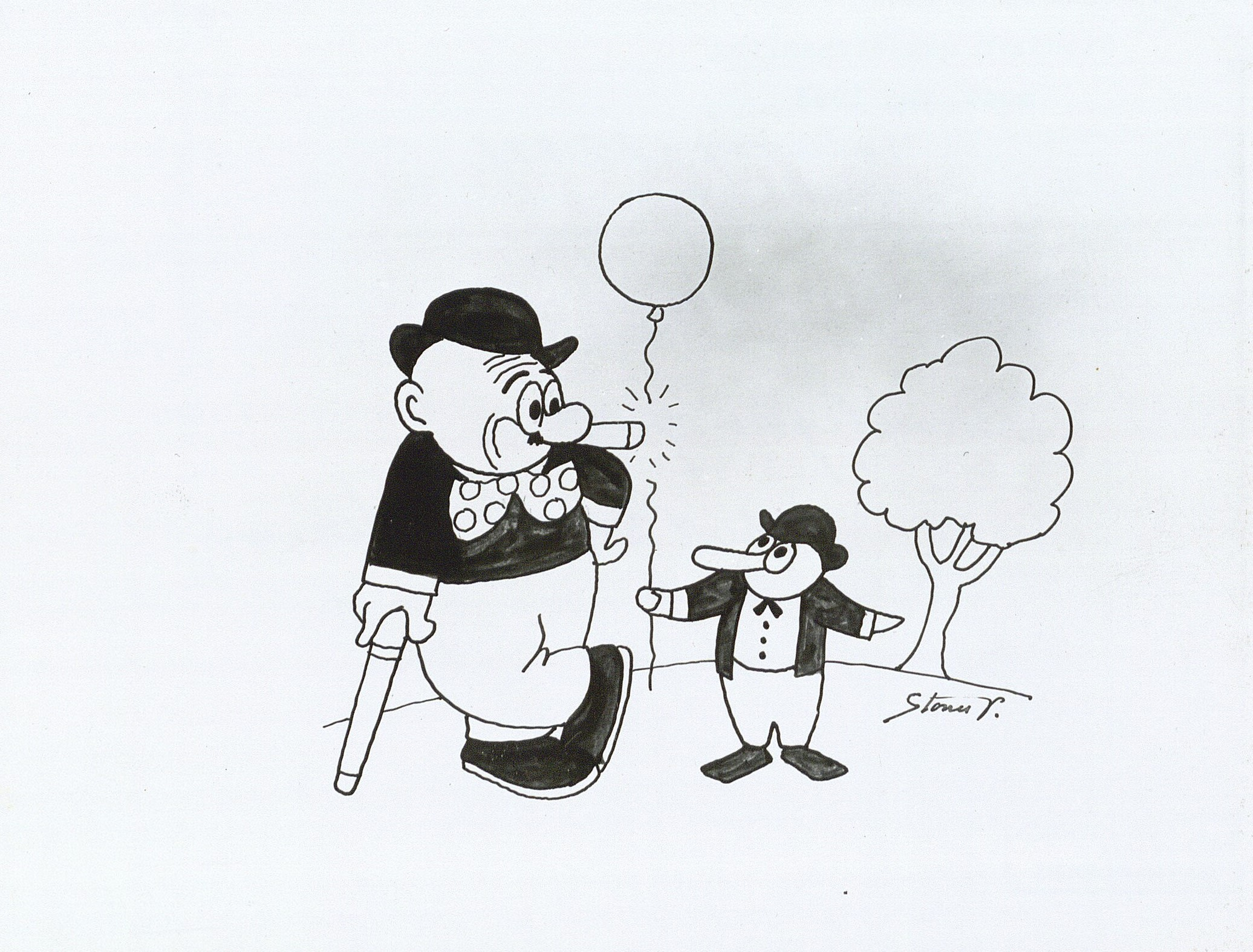
Sample of Peter and Ping

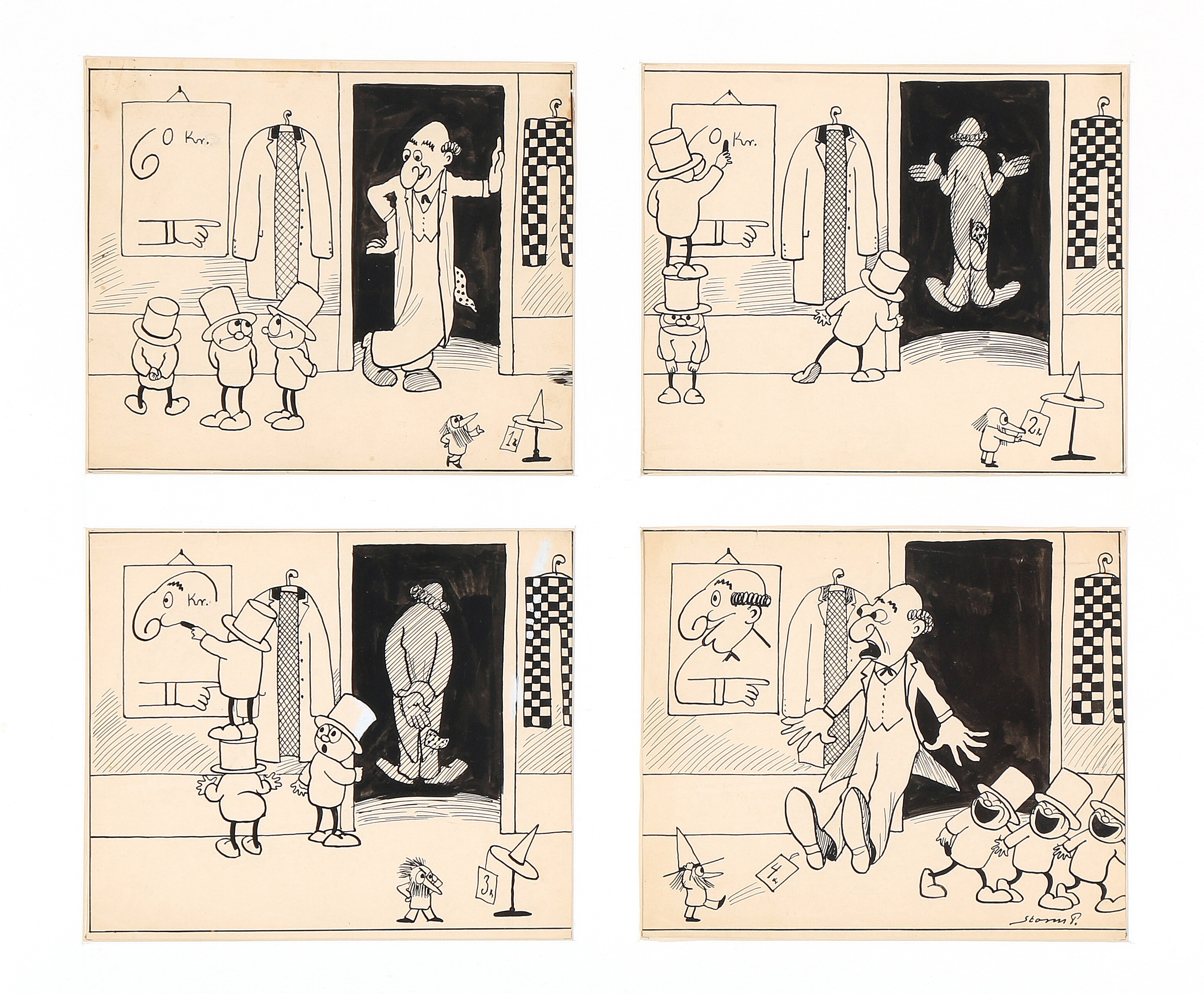
Sample of The Three Small Men and the Number Man

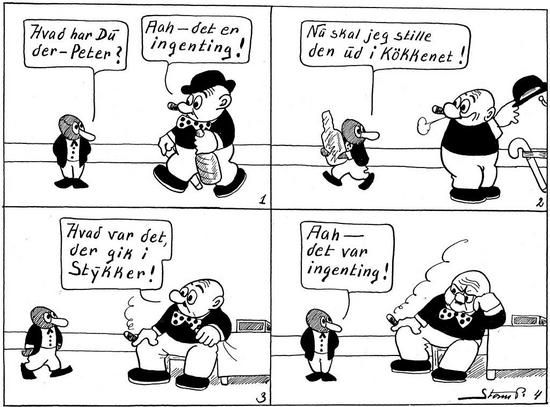
"Nothing", from Peter and Ping, 1922

Robert Storm Petersen (19 September 1882 – 6 March 1949) was a Danish cartoonist, writer, animator, illustrator, painter and humorist. He is known almost exclusively by his pen name Storm P.

== Biography ==
He was the son of a butcher and grew up in Copenhagen in a lower middle class environment. After interrupted studies at the Academy of Art, he worked as a free-lance painter, illustrator and cabaret entertainer. Already during World War I he was a well-known artist, and from about 1920 onward he was almost a national "institution" as a humorist, partly because of his versatile interests. His first comic strip was printed in 1906, in the Danish tabloid Ekstra Bladet. He was for many years connected to the Copenhagen newspaper Berlingske Tidende as a comic writer and cartoonist.

Storm P. is related to British and American humor, with his cartoons having a touch of absurdity. Mostly his starting point is a plain Copenhagen jargon, combined with a Danish homespun philosophy; the common man's comments on this world.

Though normally loved by most of his countrymen, Storm P. has also been criticised for being too toothless and petit bourgeois. In spite of his social background and interest of poor milieus, he very seldom shows deeper social criticism or revolutionary opinions; the dramatic age in which he lived left rather small stamps on his work. On the other hand he was no staunch giggler; many of his paintings deal with death, sorrow and macabre themes. He painted the victims of social injustice and misery, often with a strong touch of compassion. Melancholy and fear are not unknown to him, but his official appearance was optimistic.

== Drawings and paintings ==
Petersen left about 60,000 drawings and 100 paintings of varied quality. His drawings are very often illustrated jokes, or series of a theme besides artist sketches. Among his favourite themes are the vagabonds – who are portrayed as dressed-up petty philosophers – and the circus milieu that he regarded with much warmth.

He is perhaps best known for his Storm P. machines, comic drawings of machines that perform very simple tasks through an unnecessarily complex and usually humorous series of actions. Other cartoonists who are known for similar machine drawings are Rube Goldberg and Heath Robinson. Besides that, he illustrated many books, often written by congenial authors – Mark Twain, Jerome K. Jerome and G. K. Chesterton, among others.

As a painter he is clearly influenced by Edvard Munch and Toulouse-Lautrec, but often with an independent naivist touch. Later on, Paul Klee and Wassily Kandinsky seem to have been an inspiration in spite of his often outspoken ridiculing of modern art. Among his many themes are extérieurs from Paris. La Morgue (1906) and Kultur (1908) are two of his most well known paintings.

== Author ==
As an author, he wrote many short stories and tales, often parodies on detective stories or melodramas, small snap-shots from the Copenhagen lower middle class milieu, absurd and surrealistic tales or, especially, "monologues" put into the mouth of bums, artists, etc. Special kinds of tales were the monologues put into the mouth of his own dog, Vor ven Grog (1926–1935), in which he let the dog reflect on life, death and daily events, sometimes with a light touch of sadness and pity within the humour.

== Comics ==
Storm P. is also well known in Denmark as the author of a number of comic strips (titles in Danish):

- De tre små mænd og nummermanden, 'The Three Small Men and the Number Man', 1913–1923, is a situational comedy: three little men playing mad pranks (which sometimes fail), accompanied by an even smaller man who finds clever ways to display the strip's frame numbers.
- En underlig Mand, 'A Strange Man', from the 1930s, is an absurdist strip cartoon about a man who reacts illogically and solves problems in unexpected ways.
- Peter og Ping, 'Peter and Ping', 1922–1949, was his greatest success – a comic strip about a small citizen and his friend (or adopted son) Ping, a speaking penguin. Their experiences in Copenhagen, spiced by Ping's absurd expressions and jokes, were extremely popular and led to the foundation of a Ping Club for children. The comic strip gained some international attention, and appeared in Great Britain as well.
- Dagens flue, 'The Daily Fly', begun in 1939: drawings illustrating humorous philosophical jokes, often with a deeper meaning.

== Theater work ==
Storm P. was also an occasional freelance actor and performed in several early Danish silent movies. He later acted in stage comedies to supplement his income. In 1920 Petersen created the first Danish animated cartoon, Tre små mænd ("Three Small Men"). He also designed scenery for ballets and plays.

== Tribute ==
- In 1982 he was featured on a Danish Postal stamp.
- On 19 September 2013, Google celebrated his 131st birthday with a Google Doodle in Denmark.

== Storm P. Museum ==
Storm P. Museum is located in the Frederiksberg area of Copenhagen, in a former police station which dates back to the mid-1880s. It opened in 1977, and features expressionistic watercolors and oil painting together with a comic strip library, sound clips, photographs, films and newspaper clippings. The museum also hosts a variety of changing exhibitions and educational activities.

== Quotes ==
- "Life is a circus: you go in, bow, run around, bow again and leave."
- "– What is your opinion of the world situation? – Nothing, something got in my eye."
- "There is something fishy about art that needs to be explained."
- "We human beings are strange creatures – we have to go underground because we have invented the aeroplane. (1939)"
- "Statistics is much like a streetlight. Not very enlightening, but nice for supporting you"
- "I'd like to buy a return ticket, please" – "to where?" – "here!"
- "It is difficult to make predictions, especially about the future," (this phrase is also sometimes, mistakenly, attributed to Yogi Berra). (Note: Quote Investigator suggests that Storm P. was the earliest to say this, ca. 1952, but that the origins of the quote are yet to be confirmed definitively. The Danish newspaper Politiken says the origin is unknown, but that it is mentioned in a Danish book from 1948, which in turn says that the saying appeared in the Danish parliament around 1935-39.)

== Literature ==
- Henry Chafetz: Robert Storm Petersen (in: The American Scandinavian Review vol. 40, 1952.)
- Ib Boye (1982) Skuespilleren Storm P. (Carit Andersens Forlag)

== See also ==
- Rowland Emett, English artist with similar physical inventions
- Rube Goldberg, American artist with similar cartoon inventions
- W. Heath Robinson, English artist with similar cartoon inventions
