= Frans Kannik =

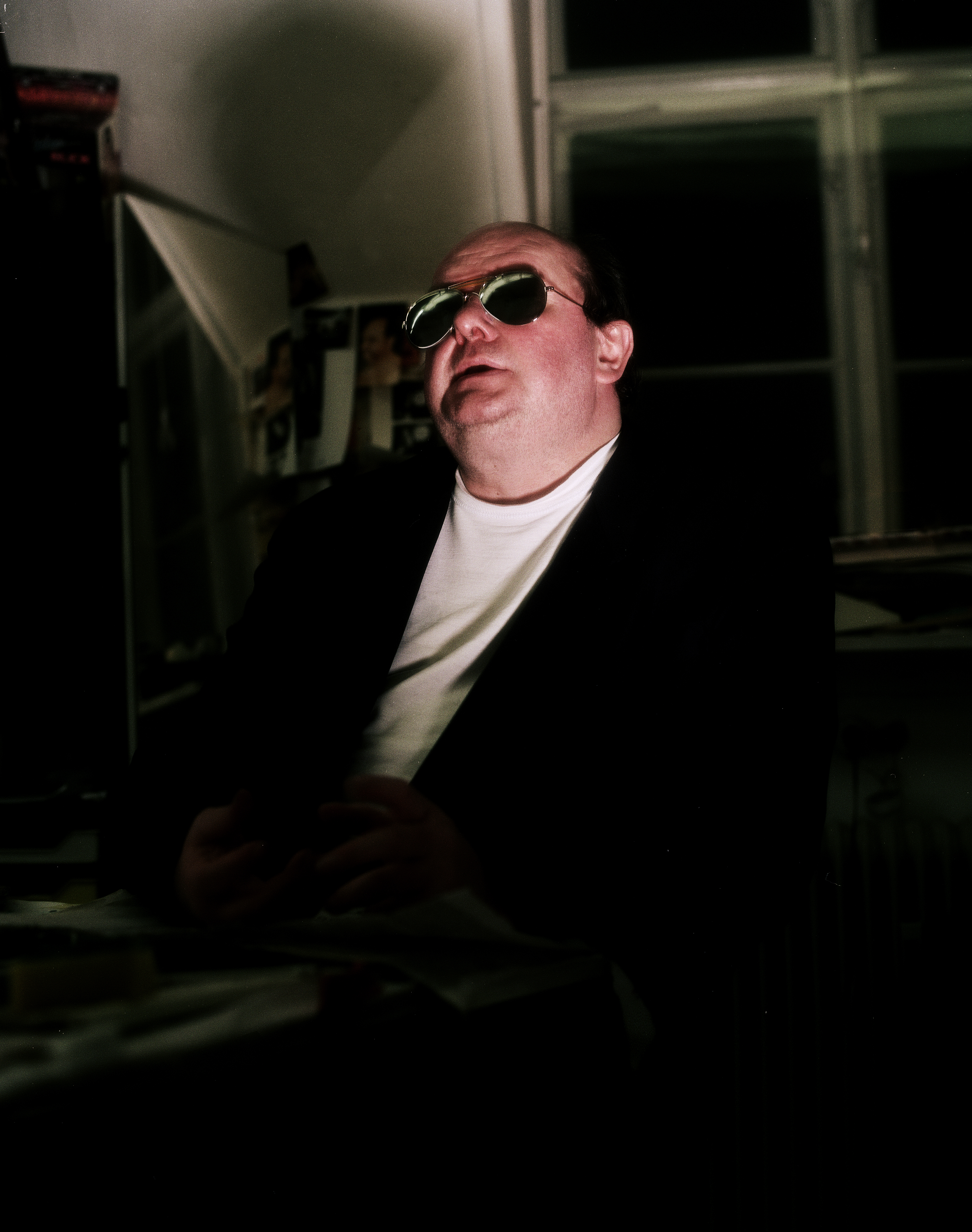
Frans Kannik, 2001

Frans Kannik (24 July 1949 – 28 July 2011) was educated in Serigraph (screen printing) in 1968. He also studied calligraphy in Oslo between 1971 and 1974. As an artist, he was generally self-educated. He was a multifaceted artist that expressed in a wide range of paintings, graphics, installation art, performance arts and sculptures.

The fact that Frans Kannik was also a sculptor may be difficult for future generations to recognize. He made numerous sculptures in plastic, gypsum, cement, foamrubber and the like, but all the sculptures and materials from the installations were destroyed after the end of the exhibition.

== The early artist years ==
Beginning in 1980, Frans Kannik quickly became an important figure in the Danish art scene. He was one of the founders of the artistic workshop cooperative Leifsgade 22 at Islands Brygge in Copenhagen, which had a central role in the 1980s neo-expressionistic development. The main part of his work was figurative painting with the naked human form at the dominant motif. The human body is painted in a classic, idealistic shape with movement as the principal theme. He often did not paint on traditional canvases but used an assemblage of materials such as blankets, linens, corrugated cardboard, plastic, vinyl etc.

In the later years, Frans Kannik worked alone with his artwork and models in his studio at Frederiksberg.

== Exhibits, art installations and books ==
1981 – Hvidovre Bibliotek (Hvidovre Library) – Abstract collage

1982 – Galleri 14 K

1982 – Kunstnernes Sommerudstilling (Summer exhibition for Artists) – Abstract vertical sculpture

1982 – Lyngby Kunstforening, Sophienholm (Lynby Art Club, Sophienholm) – Art installation with some members of Leifgade 22.

1982/83 – Nordic Textile Triennial

1982 – Domus Vista, Valby – Live performance art film

1983 – Aalborg Kunstpavillon (Aalborg Art Pavilion)

1983 – Lyngby Kunstbiblioteket (Lyngby Art Library) – Art installation

1983 – Tranegården, Gentofte Kommunes Kunstbibliotek (Gentofte Art Library) – Exhibition with Anita Jørgensen

1983 – Valseværket – Art installation painted directly on the wall

1983 – Musikhus (Concert venue), Århus – With Leifgade 22 and other artists

1984 – Leifgade 22 – Workshop exhibition

1984 – Filosofgangen Odense – With Leifgade 22

1984 – Kunstforeningen Gammelstrand (Art Club Gammelstrand) – With Leifgade 22

1985 – Various locations in Denmark – Sammenslutningen af Danske Kunstforeninger (The Association of Danish Art Clubs)

1985 – Skovhuset – Hvedekorn med Rødder gennem 65 år (Wheat Seed with Roots throughout 65 years) – Installation "The birth of Venus".

1985 – Brandts Pakhus (Brandts Warehouse) – With Leifgade 22 and other artists

1985 – Nordjylland Kunstmuseum (Art Museum in Northern Jutland) – With Liefsgarde 22

1985 – Langelinie, Copenhagen – With Liefsgarde 22

1985 – Den Frie Udstillingsbygning (Den Frie Centre of Contemporary Art), Copenhagen, Gyrr's Projekter (Gyrr's Project) – With various artists

1985 – Brandts Pakhus (Brandts Warehouse) – Own exhibit

1985 – Oostende Belgium, "Europe Prize of Ostend for Painting 1986" – won bronze medal

1986 – Hollufgård Fyn – Sculpture

1986 – Bikubegården – With Leifgade 22 – Sculpture

1986 – Randers Kunstmuseum (Randers Art Museum) – With Leifgade 22, Sculpture

1986 – Malaga Spain – With Leifgard 22, "Spain Stretch to the Sun" sculpture

1986 – Brandts Klædefabrik (Brandts Clothing Factory), Odense – "Figure in Water with Light" sculpture

1986 – Performance Kongo – Video art

1986 – DSB Udsmykning (Decorations for the Danish National Railway)

1986 – Glostrup Kunstforening (Glostrup Art Club)

1986 – Efterårsudstilling Charlottenborg (Fall Exhibition at Charlottenborg)

1986 – Yorkshire Great Britain, Yorkshire Contemporary Art Group, Danish Show

1986 – Picturas, Lund, Sweden – With Leifgard 22

1987 – Brandts Galleri (Brandts Gallery), FIAC 87, Paris – With various artists

1987 – Galleri Brandt (Gallery Brandt), Copenhagen – "Peinturages"

1987 – Juul & Asbek

1987 – Paris, France

1987 – Tuborgs Kunstforening (Tuborg Art Club)

1988 – Cartier, France (La Foundation Cartier pour l'art contemporain in Jouy-en-Josas)

1988 – Brandt, Fredensborg – With Anita Jørgensen and other artists

1988 – Chris Evers Forum, Hamburg

1988 – Nordisk Kunstcenter (Nordic Art Center) – With Leifsgade 22

1988 – Galleri Brandt (Gallery Brandt), Fredensborg – Glass art & pictures, With various artists

1989 – Det kongelige Bibliotek (Danish Royal Library), "Denmark and the French Revolution”

1989 – Journalisthøjskolen (School of Journalism) –"Red & Black"

1989 – Sønderjyllandshallen, Aabenraa – The Creek exhibition

1989 – Rampen, Bikubens Hus på Nørre Vold, Copenhagen

1989 – Grand Marnier Prix Art Moderne, Hans Just, Copenhagen – With Anita Jørgensen and other artists

1989 – La Rochelle, France

1989 – Galleri Brandt (Gallery Brandt), Fredensborg "Nye Arbejder", The Nine

1990 – Næsehornsudstilling (Rhino Exhibition), Copenhagen – With Anita Jørgensen and other artists

1990 – Gammel Holtegaard and Galerie Ek'ymose, Bordeaux, France

1990 – Galerie Jean Christophe Aguas, France – With Leifgade 22

1991 – Kanal København, "Art Experiment on Copenhagen", Art installation

1991 – Bizart

1991 – Gronningen, Charlottenborg

1991 – Esbjergs Kunstmuseum (Esbjergs Art Museum)

1991 – Frans Kannik (Biography) – book

1992 – SkovhusNyt, Vaerløse – With Pontus Kjerrman

1993 – Kunsthallen (Art Arena)

1993 – Den Frie Udstillingsbygning (Den Frie Centre of Contemporary Art), Copenhagen, – Pathos – With various artists

1993 – Gronningen, Charlottenborg, "Art and Space"

1993 – Artist Wine – Det Franske Vinlager A/S "Chateau Barateau"

1993 – McVerdi, Copenhagen

1993 – Kunsthallen, Købmagergade, – "Interim art as" (also Go Card "Vitruvian Woman")

1994 – National Danish Radio – Venus – Video art

1994 – Danish National Television program about the painter Frans Kannik in "Gallery 11" and Lithographic Workshop, Hostrup-Pedersen & Johansen, Valby

1994 – Grønningen, Crimphuset in Allerod

1994 – Arti, Amsterdam – With various artists

1995 – Grønningen, Charlottenborg

1995 – Galleri Birch (Gallery Birch), Copenhagen – Own exhibit, "Tropicana”

1995 – Hand-colored intaglio (prints) – Each intaglio hand-colored by FK (edition H.C. Hornung)

1995 – Press Christmas post card

1996 – Birger Christensen – Installation

1996 – Grønningen, Knullaby 69

1996 – Bizar Carviar – Caviar Movie – Installation

1997 – Poland, Torum (Regional Museum in Brodnica, Museum in Grudziadz), With various artists. "Looking after Notre Dame"

1997 – Fuglsanghus, Hørsholm, Mikkelborg Park Kunstforening (Mikkelborg Park Art Club), "Models Wanted" – Lithographs

1998 – Illustrated the "Marquis de Sade"

1998 – Toupe-Test – Film Card

1998 – Grønningen, Hammershøj – Photostat

1998 – Go Card – Advertisement for Faelledparken summer music schedule

1999 – 50th birthday book "As an artist you to be clever enough to have an idea and stupid enough to go ahead and make it"

1999 – Hvidovre Kunstbibliotek (Hvidovre Art Library)

1999 – Grønningen "2 Blowup"

1999 – Grønningen, Charlottenborg – "Eye”

2000 – Grønningen, Smartart pen "The Hygiene Art Pen" installation

2000 – StandArt 2000 – KannikKasting – Smoking Models Wanted

2001 – Institute de Smart Art – Watercolor postcards and manifest

2001 – Go Card

2001 – Galleri Vejle (Gallery Vejle), "Artist and Model" – Own exhibit

2001 – Grønningen catalog – "Join the pARTy!"

2002 – Grønningen, Charlottenborg – "Kontoret for Alt – Office for Everything – Bureau de TOUT" – SmArt's new Product: ArTiTs de Looks

2002 – Arken Champagne, Institut de Smart Art – Advertisement for three different champagnes, Titanic, Medusa, and Arken

2002 – Nordjyllands Kundstmuseum (Northern Jutland Art Museum), Aalborg – “Painter and Model” Own exhibit

2002 – Christmas exhibit in Galleri Vejle – With various artists

2002 – Danish postage stamp

2003 – Galleri Veggerby – 2 exhibits

2003 – Grønningen catalog – “Manifest”

2004 – Grønningen catalog – “Bridge over troubled water”

2004 – Wrote and published “Fed Til You’re Dead – Volume 1”

2004 – London, England

2004 – Book “Studio – the artist’s workshops” by Lisbeth Bonde

2004 – Gammel Holtegaard – “Backlighting”

2005 – Smith Anderson Editions, Palo Alto, CA – Group exhibit

2005 – Galleri Veggerby – Various artists – “Bibliotheca Benjaminata”

2005 – Galleri Veggerby – Own exhibit

2005 – Grønningens Catalog – Campbells soup can “The Missing Link” with DVD – Copenhagen Opera House

2006 – Gammel Holtegaard, “A step in the right direction”

2006 – Grønningen, Charlottenborg

2006 – Aalborg Kunstpavillon, With Tomas Ortved

2006 – Biennial for Contemporary Art, Sweden – Watercolors

2007 – Ronneby, Sweden – Nordic Watercolors

2007 – Galleri Clifford, Daugard

== Videos ==
Frans Kannik painting with watercolor on YouTube

Frans Kannik and model on YouTube

== Public Collections ==
Artwork of Frans Kannik in Danish Museums

== Biennial for Contemporary Art, Sweden 2006 ==
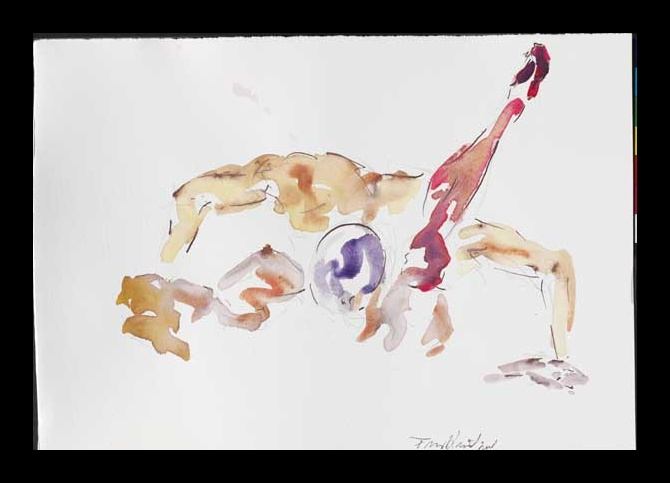
Nr.2

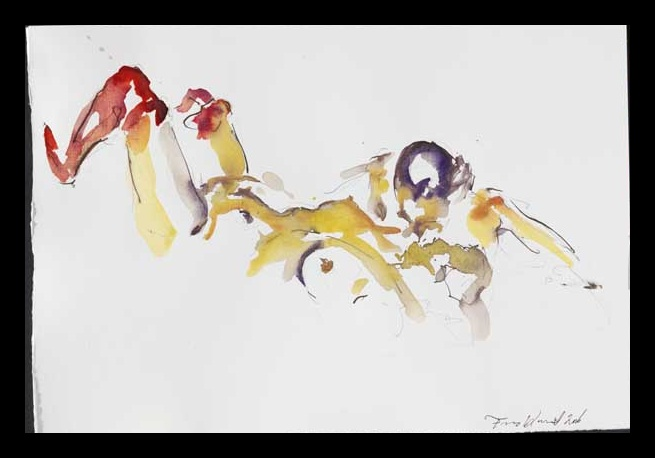
Nr.3

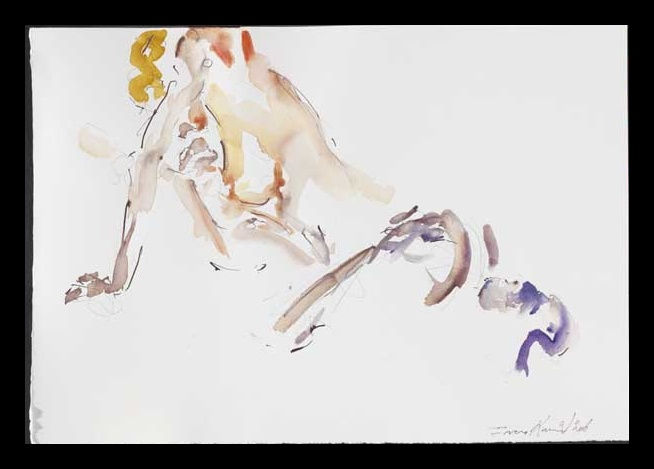
Nr.4

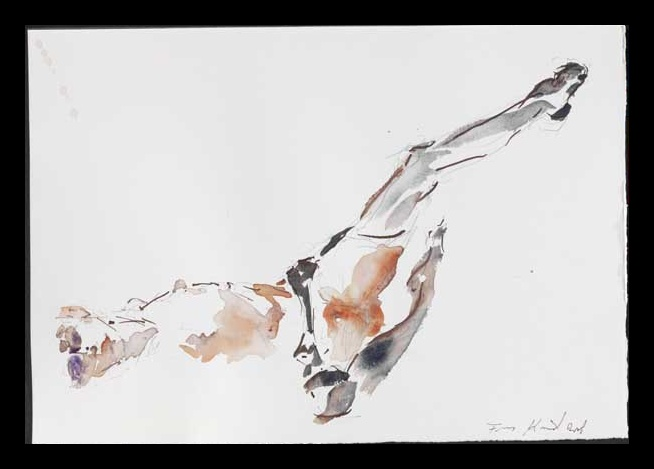
Nr.5

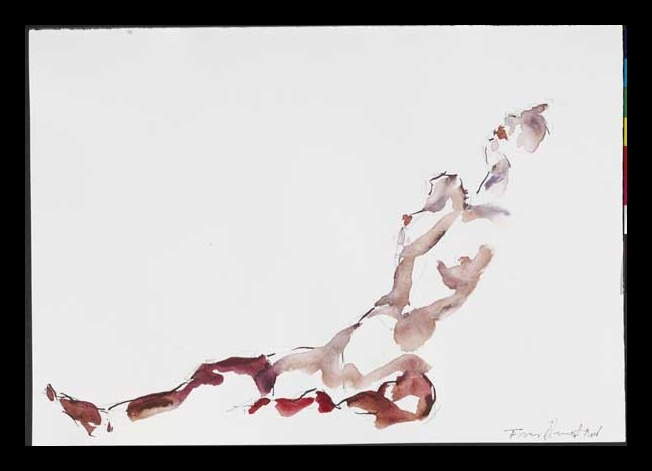
Nr.6

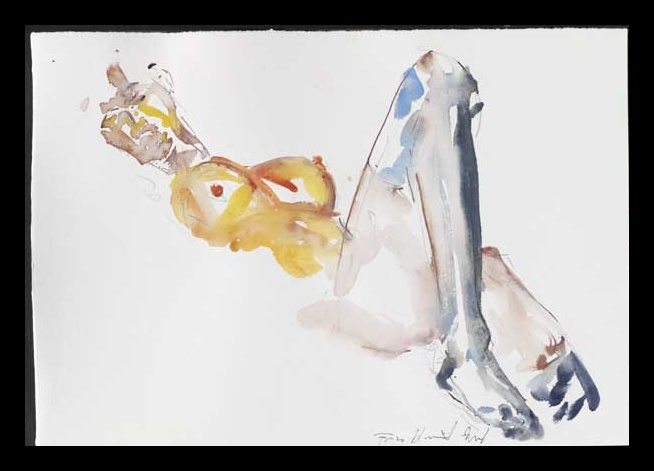
Nr.7

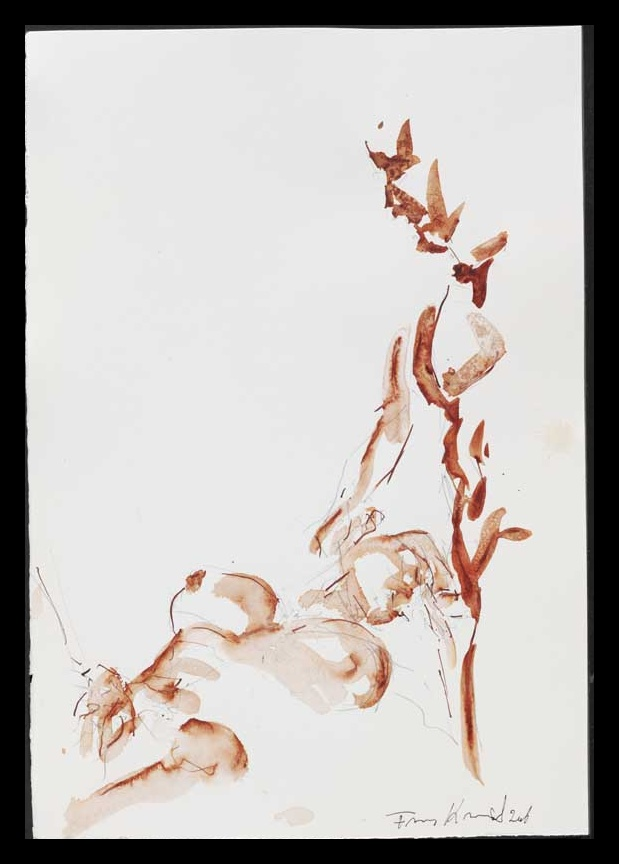
Nr.8

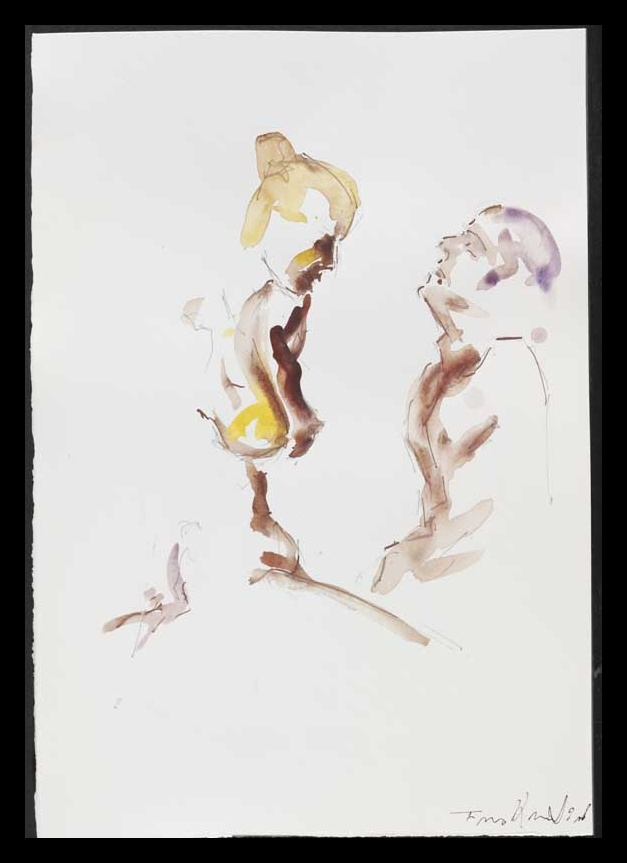
Nr.9

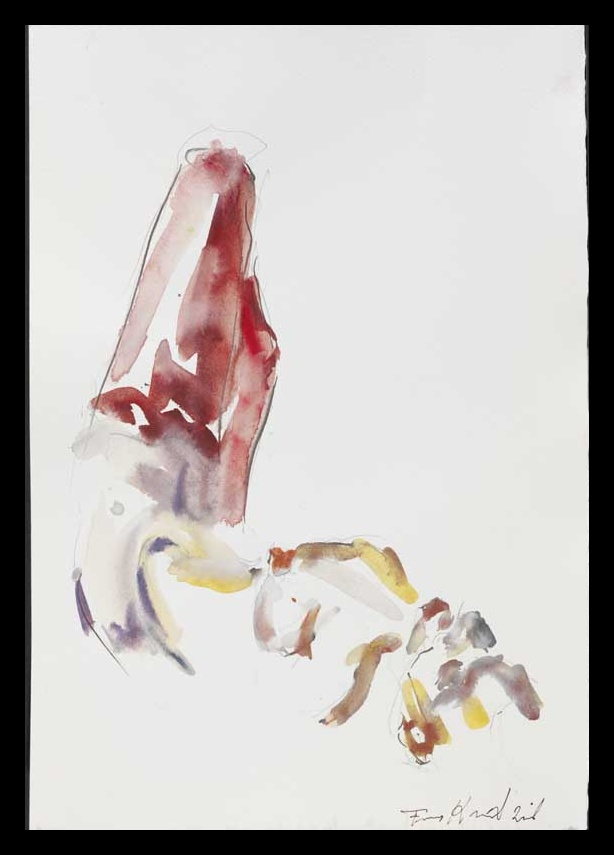
Nr.10

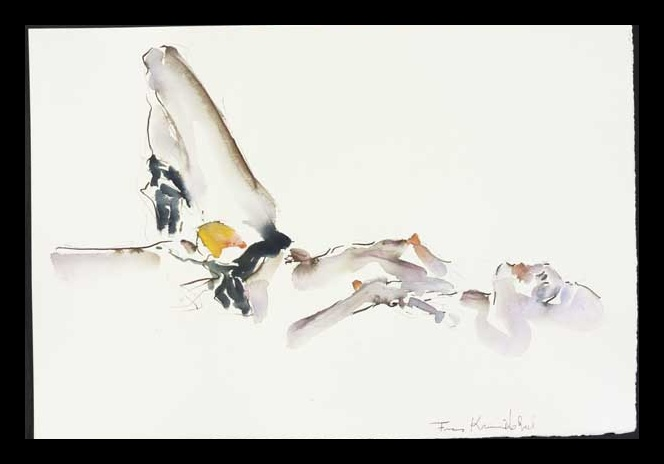
Nr.11

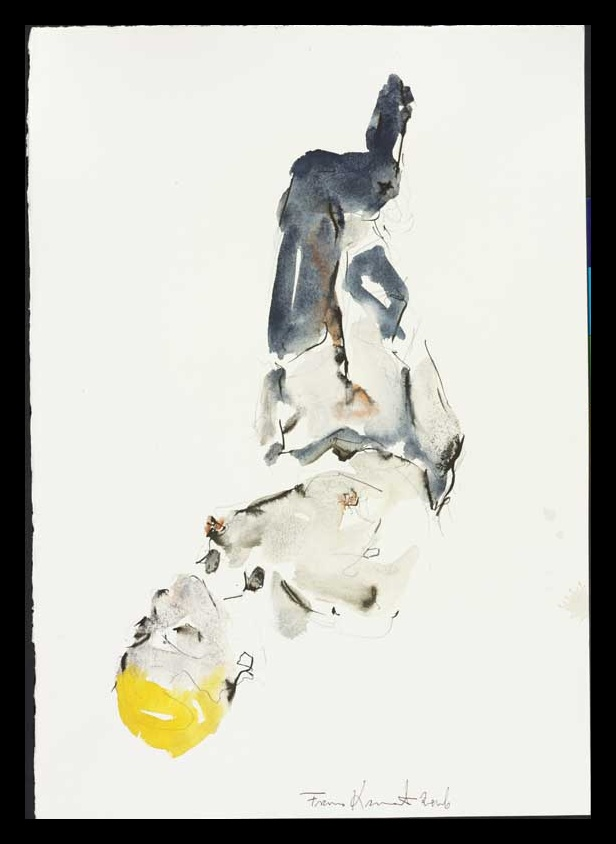
Nr.12

== Galleri Veggerby separate exhibition 2003 ==
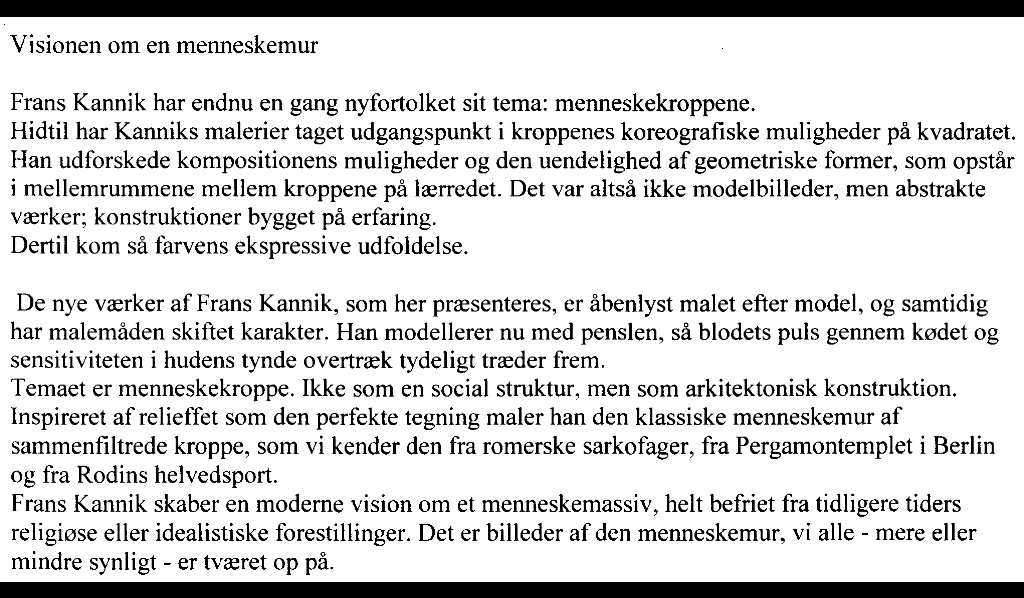
Nr.1

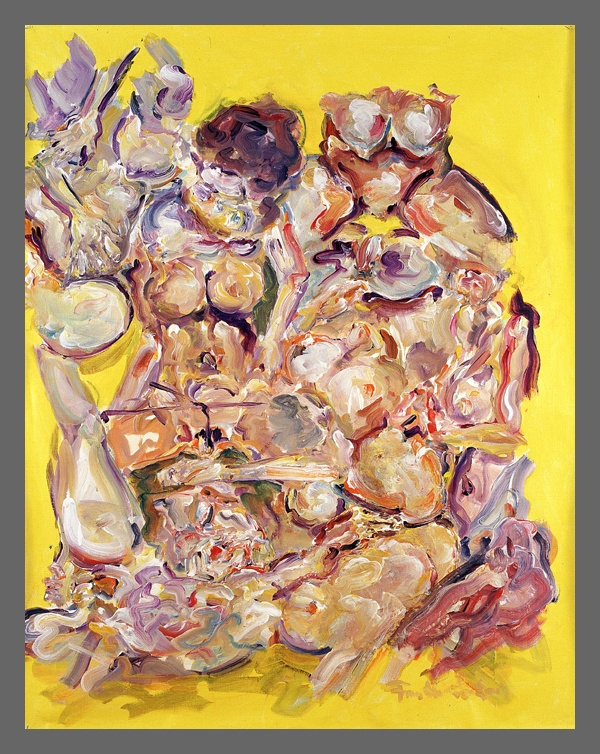
Nr.2 / 110x100cm.

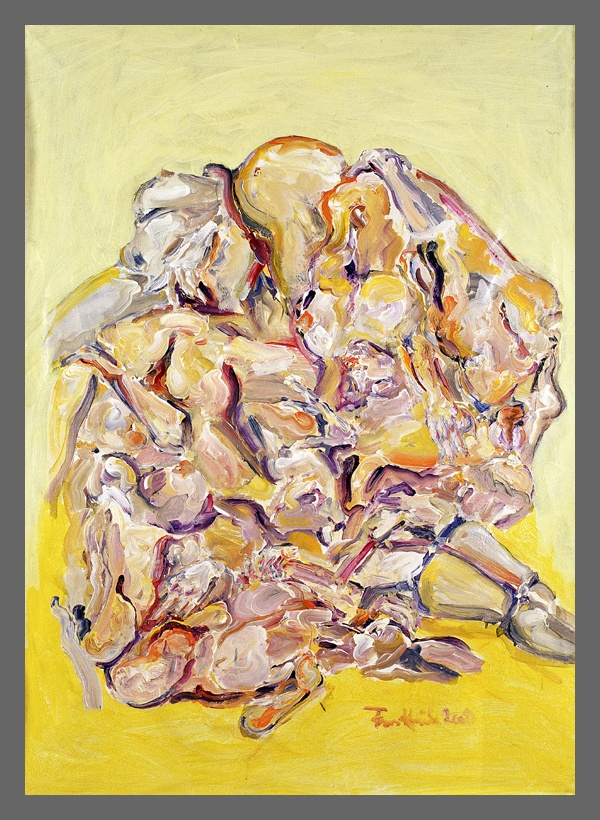
Nr.3 / 110x100cm.

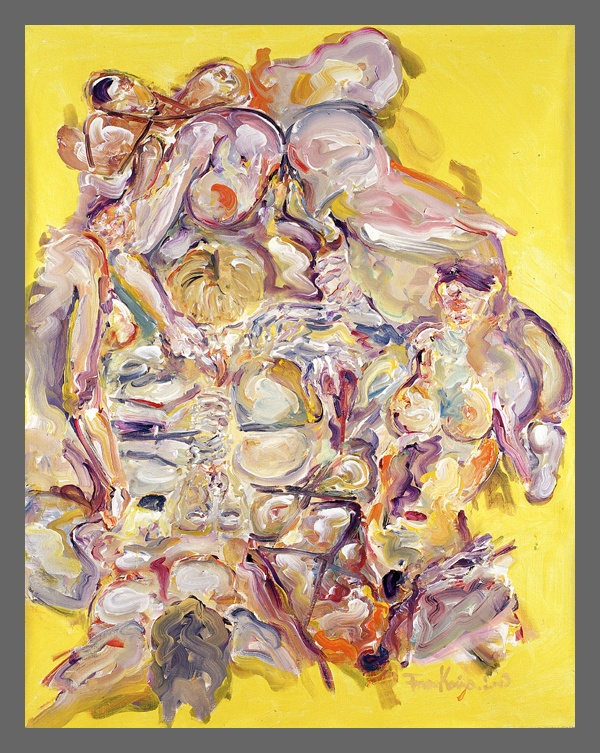
Nr.4 / 110x100cm.

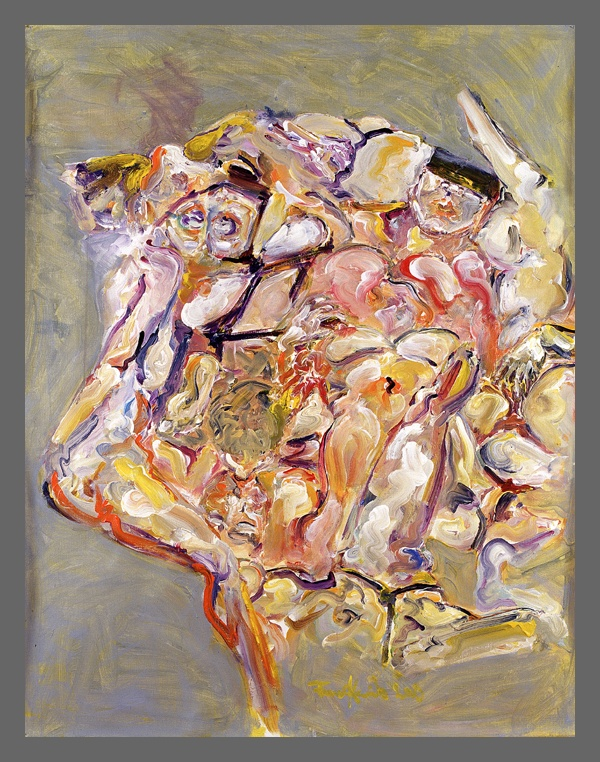
Nr.5 / 110x100cm.

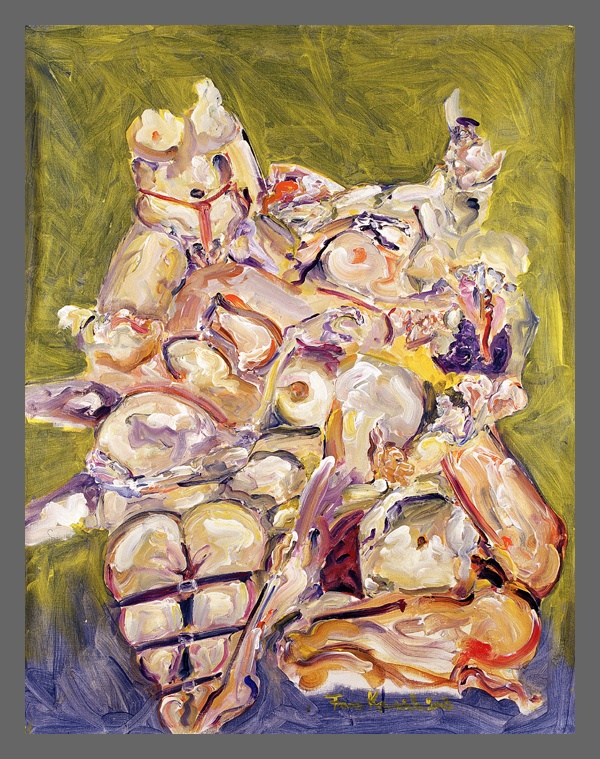
Nr.6 / 110x100cm.

== Gallery Birch separate Exhibition 1995 ==
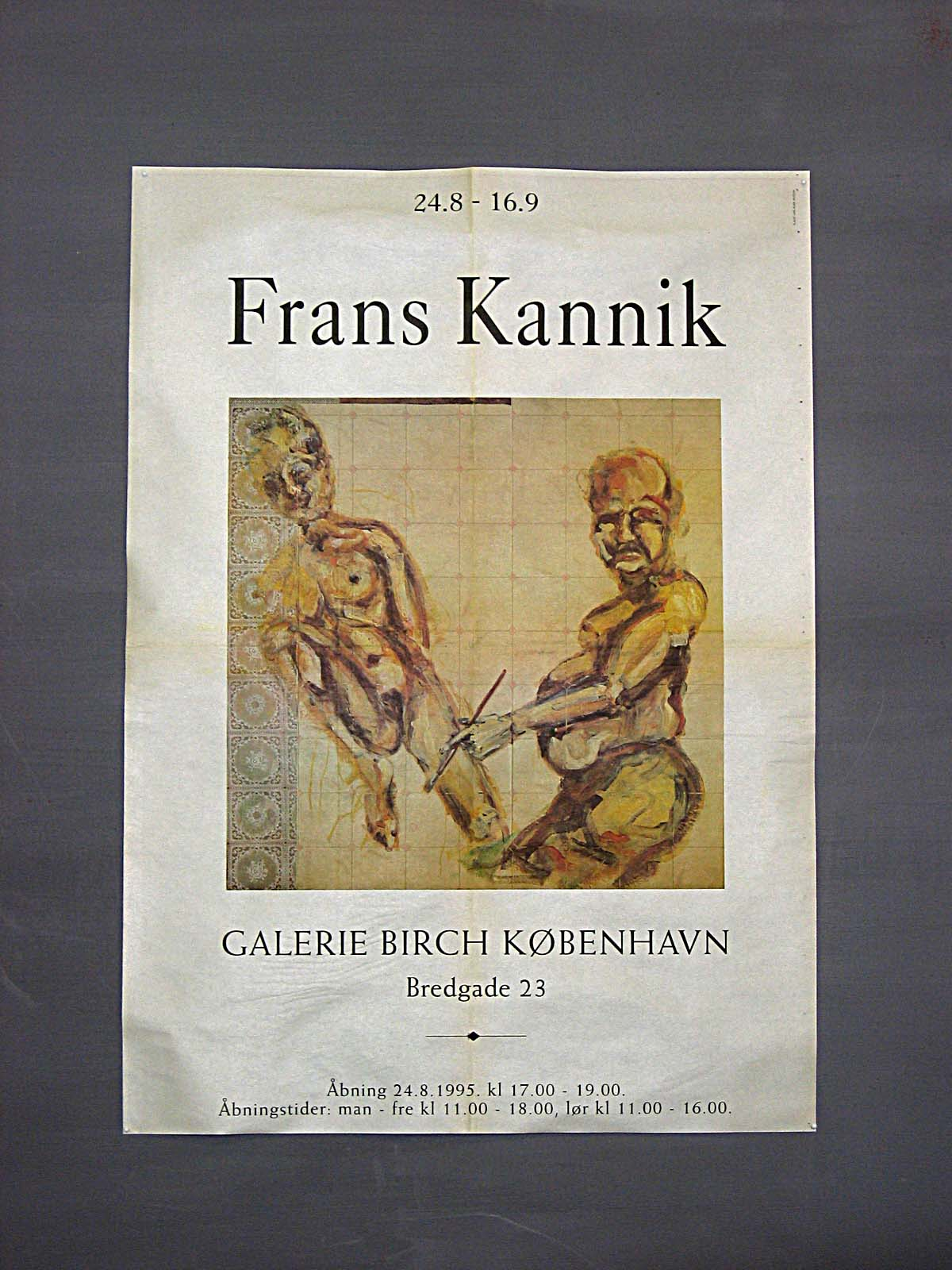
No.1

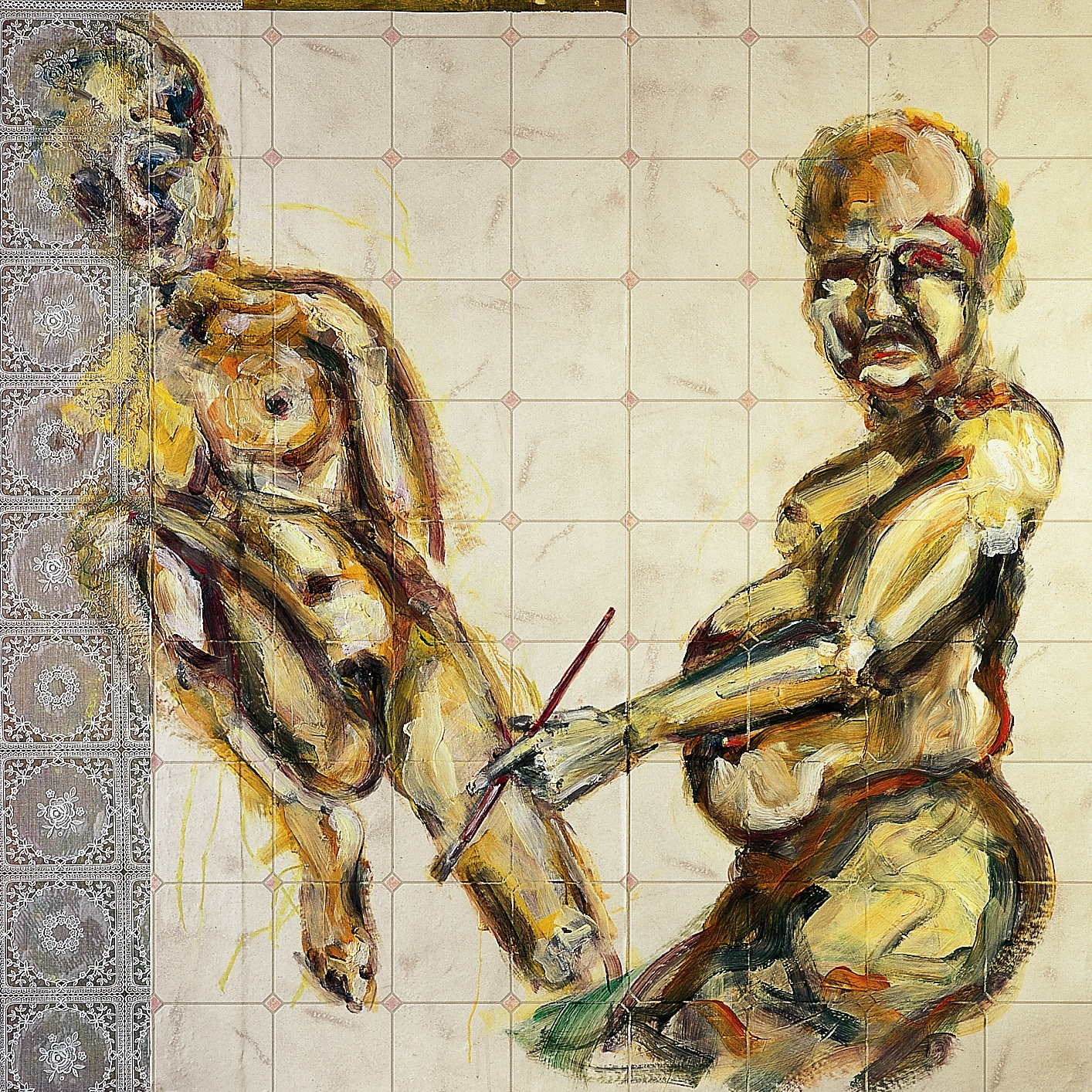
No.2 / 110x110cm.

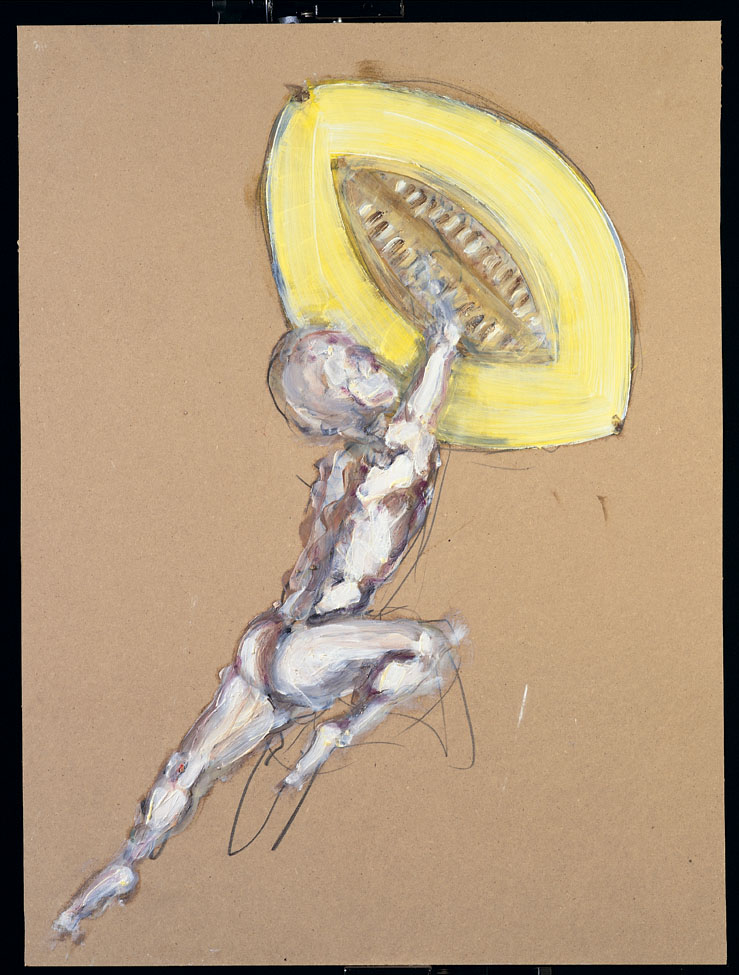
No.3 / 40x30cm.

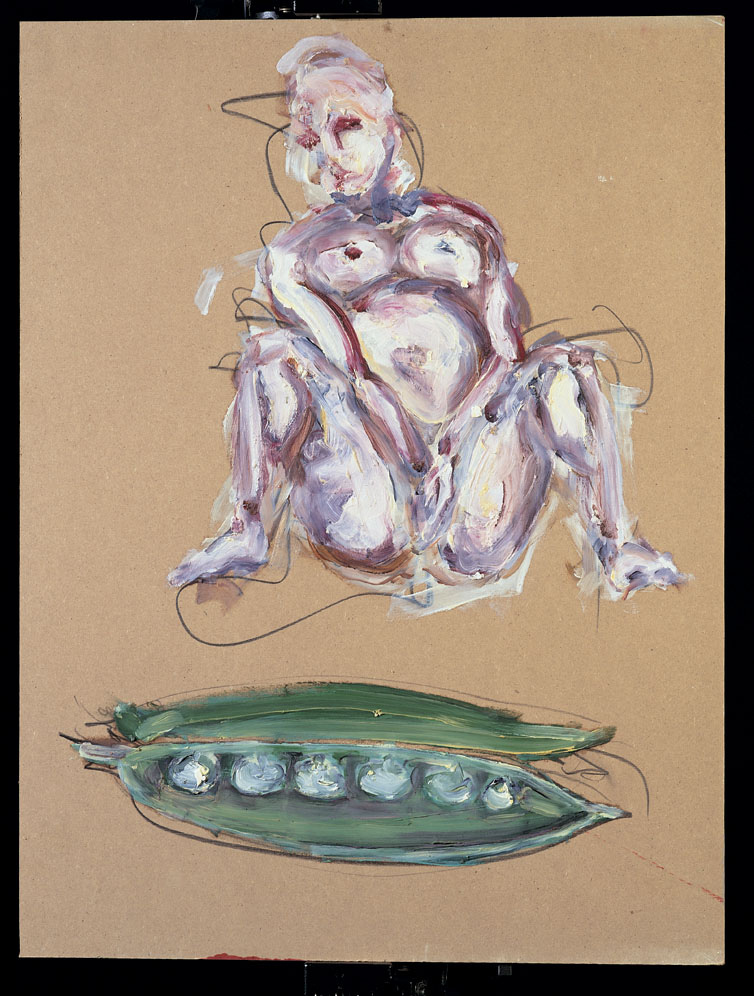
No.4 / 40x30cm.

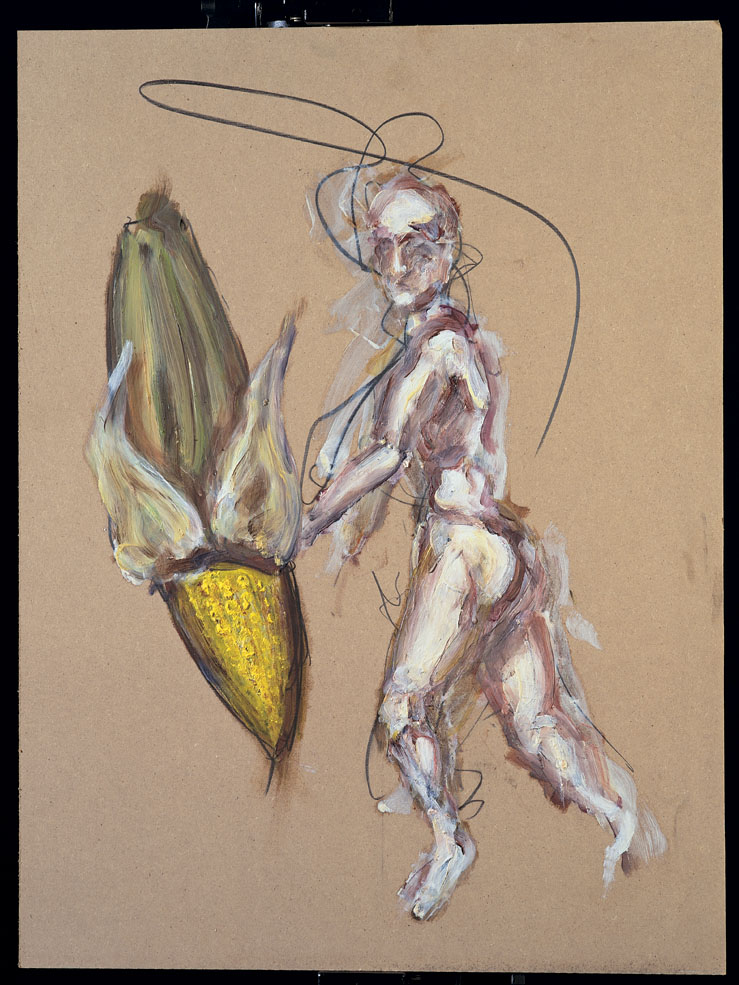
No.5 / 40x30cm.

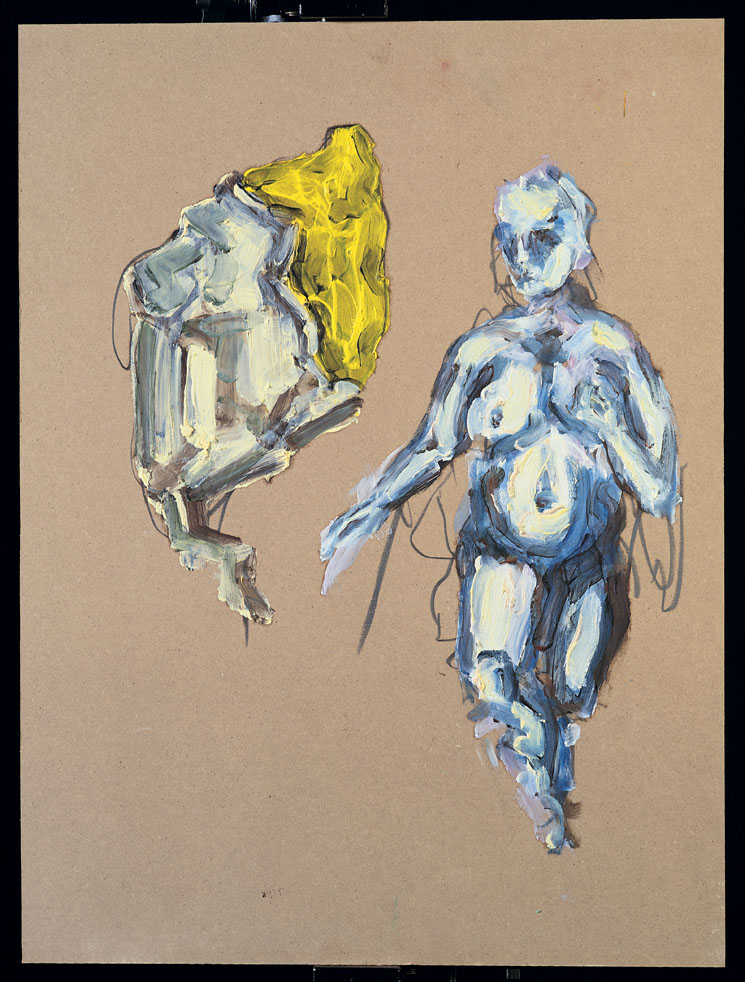
No.6 / 40x30cm.

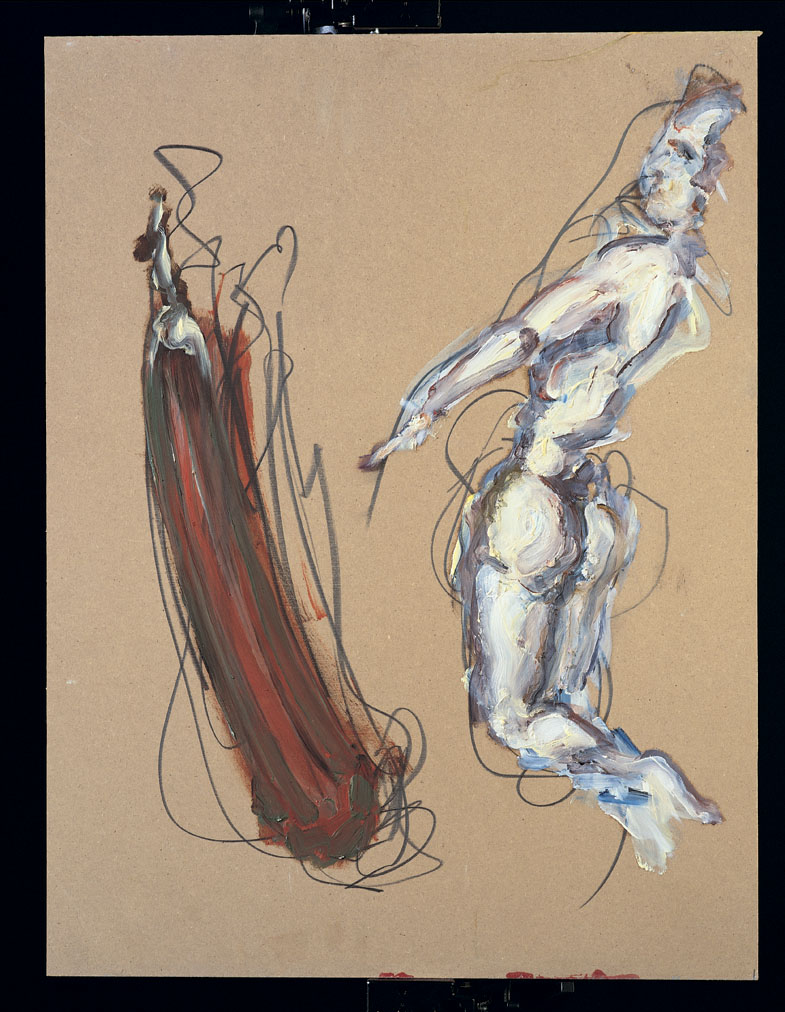
No.7 / 40x30cm.

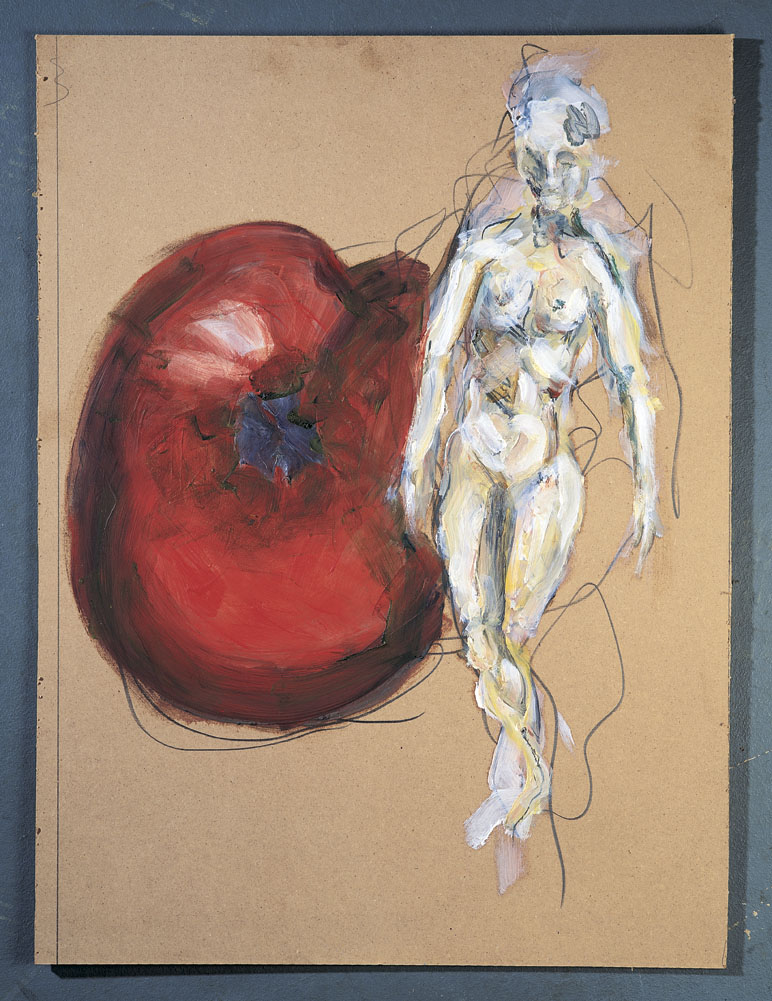
No.8 / 40x30cm.

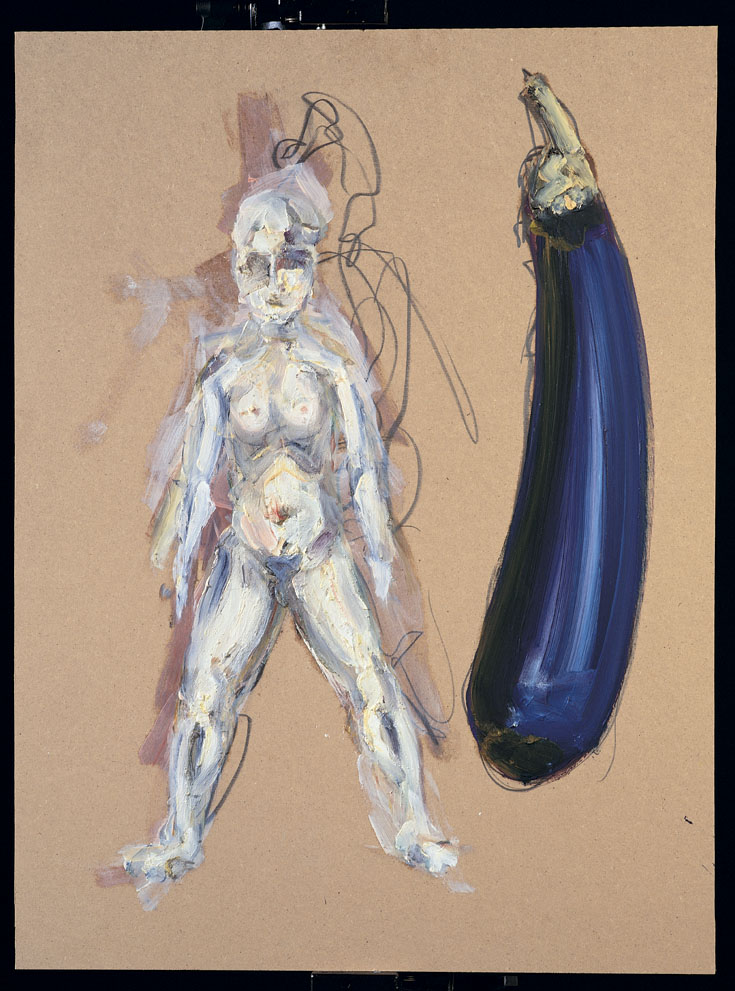
No.9 / 40x30cm.

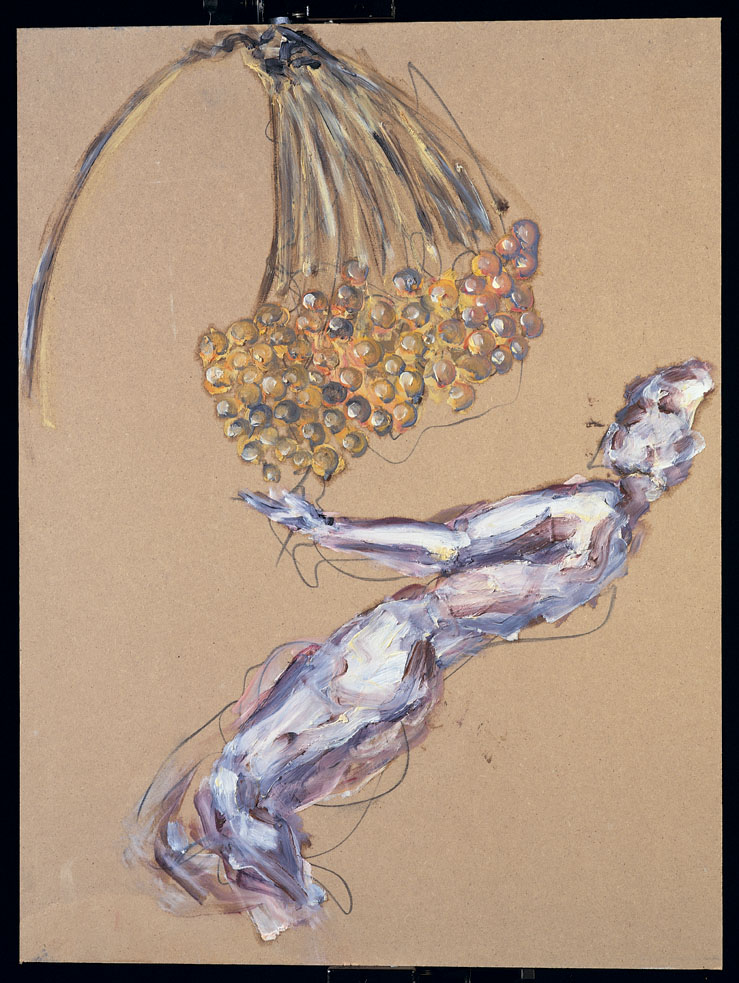
No.10 / 40x30cm.

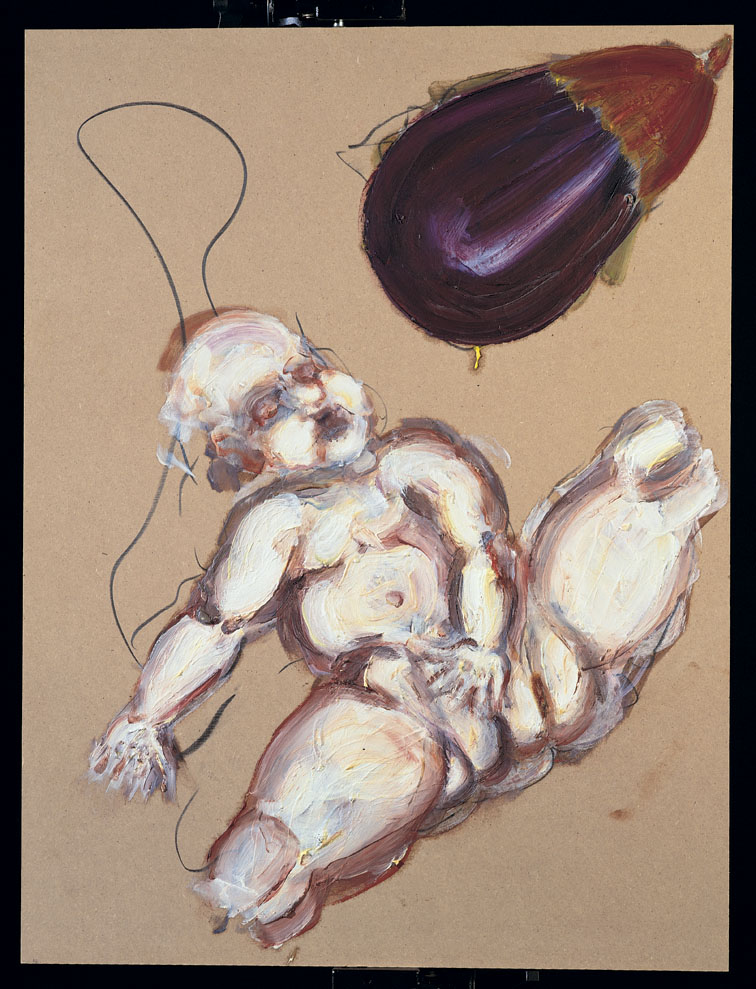
No.11 / 40x30cm.

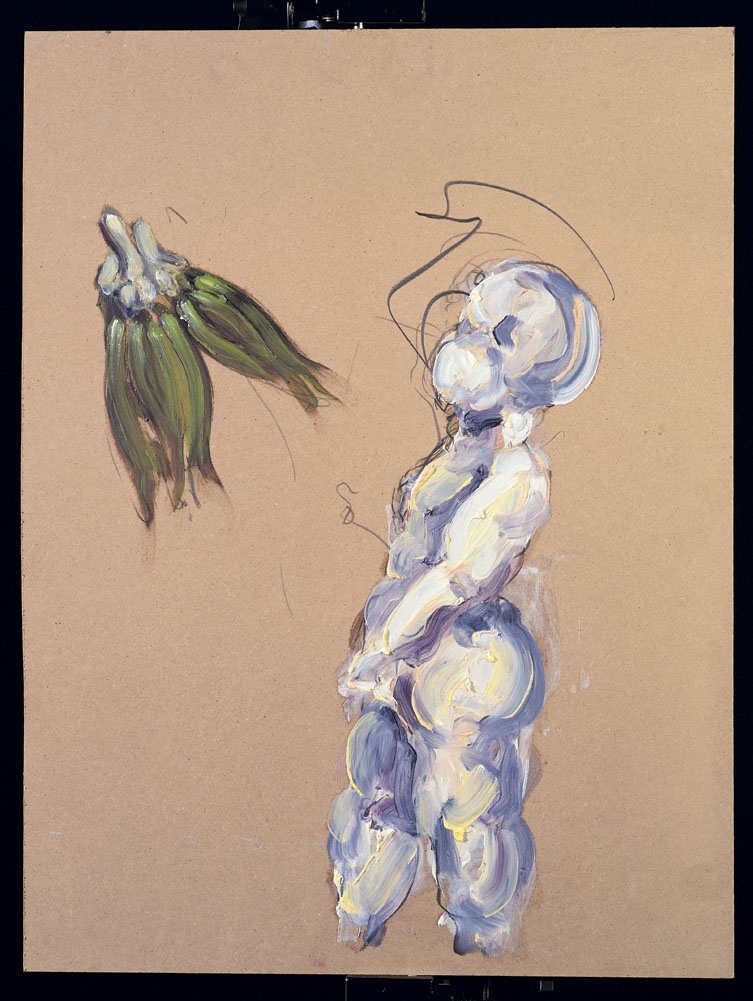
No.12 / 40x30cm.

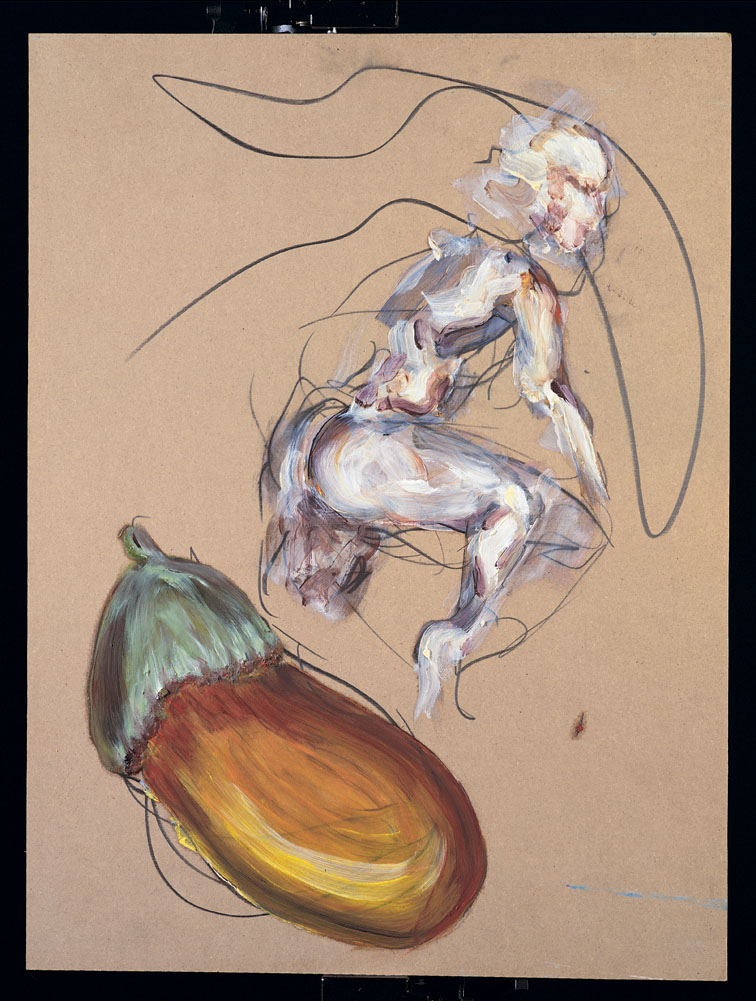
No.13 / 40x30cm.

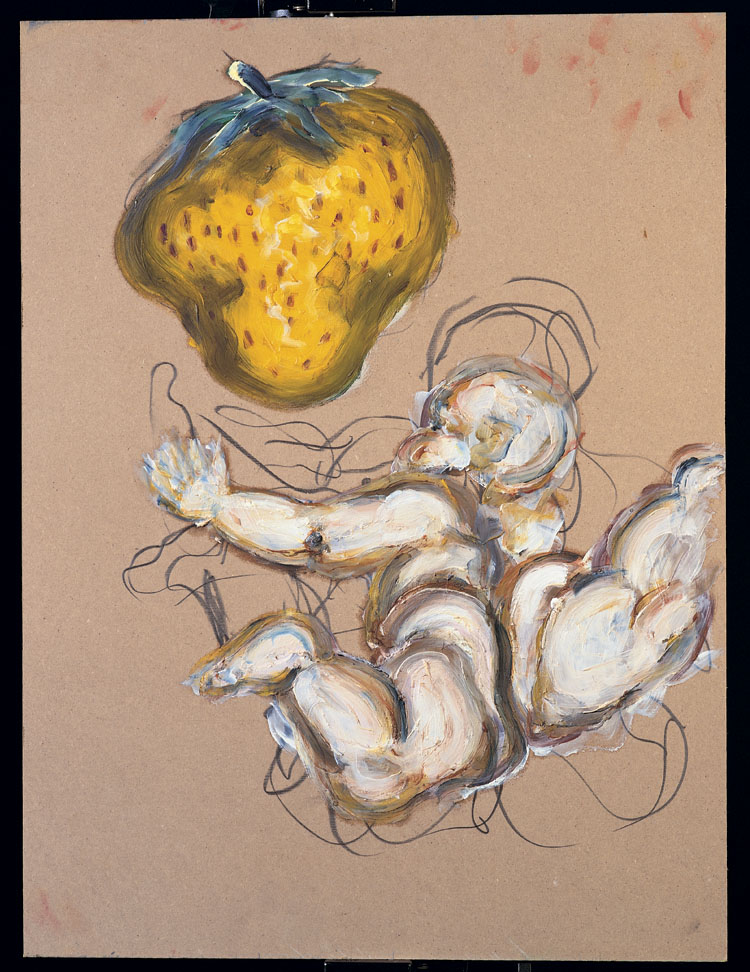
No.14 / 40x30cm.

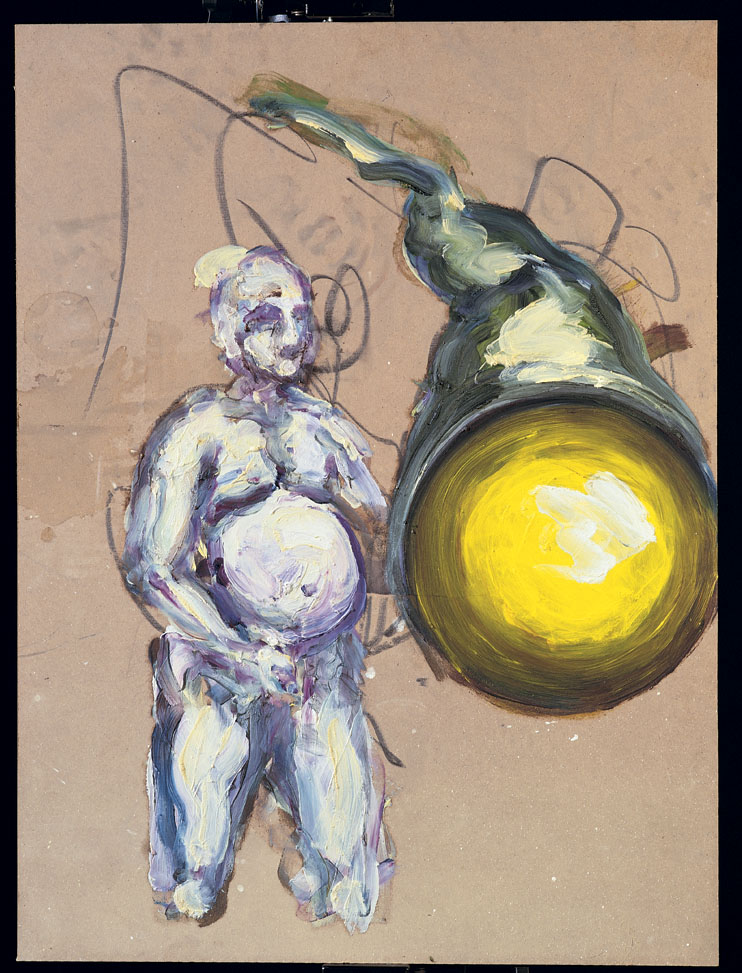
No.15 / 40x30cm.

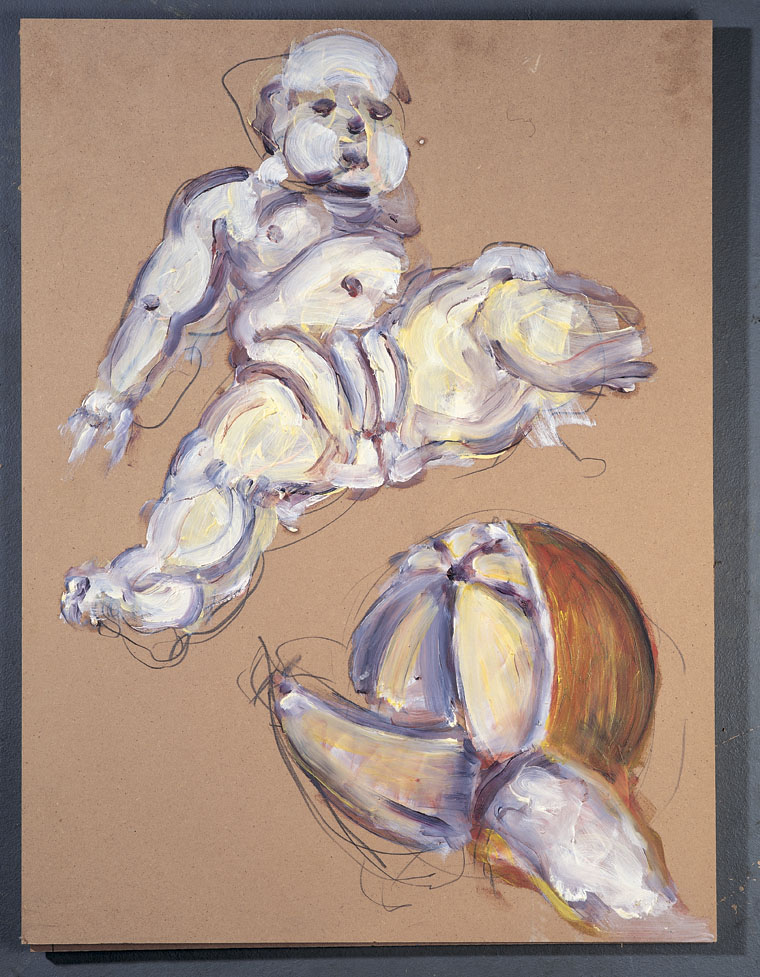
No.16 / 40x30cm.

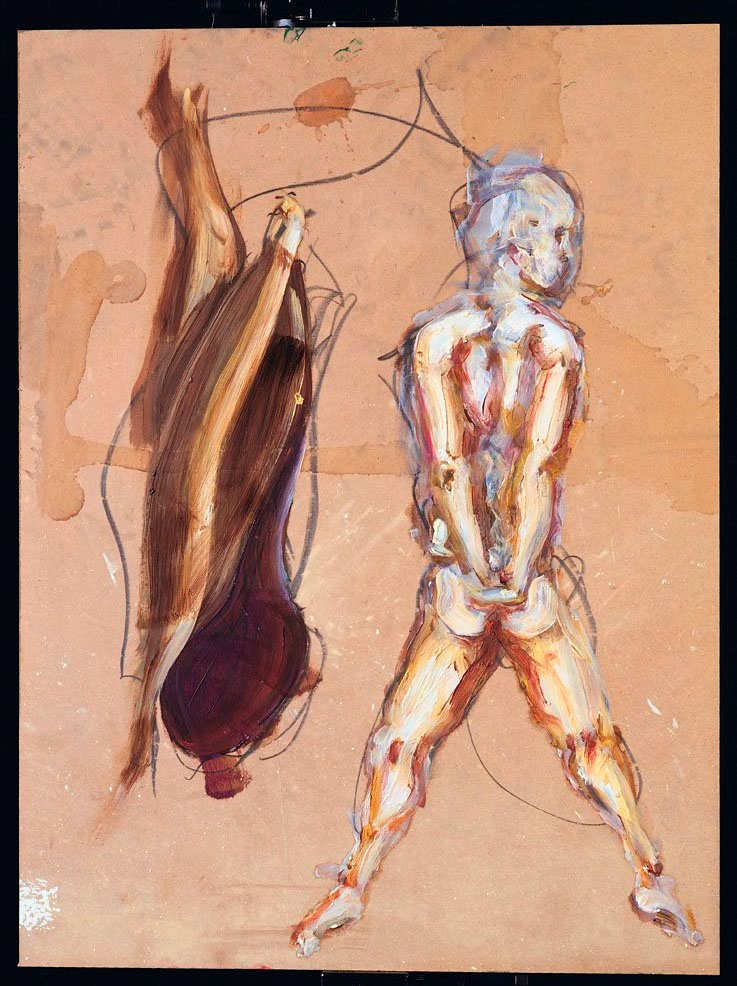
No.17 / 40x30cm.

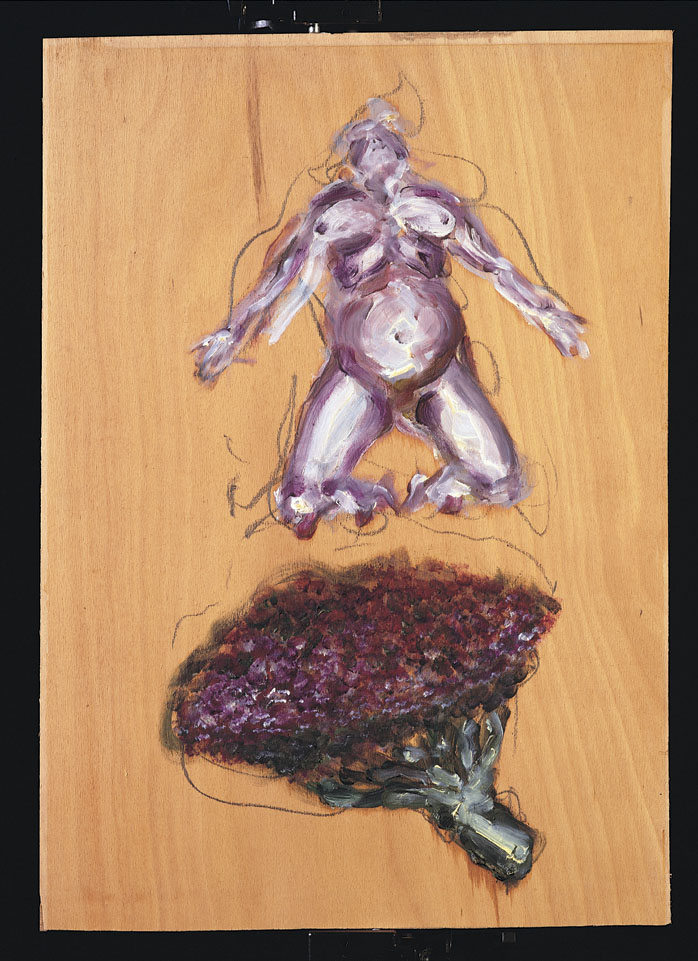
No.18 / 40x30cm.
