= List of town tramway systems in Denmark =

This is the list of town tramway systems in Denmark. Currently operating systems are shown with a blue background colored rows. The use of the diamond (♦) symbol indicates where there were (or are) two or more independent tram systems operating concurrently within a single metropolitan area. Those tram systems that operated on other than standard gauge track (where known) are indicated in the 'Notes' column.

Name of system	Location	Traction type	Date (from)	Date (to)	Notes
Aalborg Letbane Plusbus^{da}	Aalborg	Electric?			A light rail project that was planned to open in 2021, but was not built. A Plusbus system was built instead.
Trams in Århus- Aarhus Sporveje; Aarhus Sporveje. Aarhuus Sporvejsselskab 1884–1895. Aarhus Elektriske Sporvej 1904–1927. Århus Sporveje 1927 – (1971).	Aarhus	Horse	31 May 1884	23 May 1895	Bus service and tramway Aarhus Sporveje
Trams in Århus- Aarhus Sporveje; Aarhus Sporveje. Aarhuus Sporvejsselskab 1884–1895. Aarhus Elektriske Sporvej 1904–1927. Århus Sporveje 1927 – (1971).	Aarhus	Electric	7 July 1904	7 November 1971	Gauge: 1,000 mm (3 ft 3 3/8 in)
Aarhus Letbane	Aarhus	Electric. Light rail/Tram-train	21 December 2017	-	
Trams in Copenhagen. Copenhagen Railway Company 1863-1866. Kjøbenhavns Sporvei-Selskab 1866–1898. Kjøbenhavns Forstæders Sporveisselskab 1872–1898. Sølvgadens Sporvejsselskab 1888–1898. De kjøbenhavnske Sporveje 1898–1911. Københavns Sporveje 1911–1974.	Copenhagen	Horse	22 October 1863	14 June 1915	
Trams in Copenhagen. Copenhagen Railway Company 1863-1866. Kjøbenhavns Sporvei-Selskab 1866–1898. Kjøbenhavns Forstæders Sporveisselskab 1872–1898. Sølvgadens Sporvejsselskab 1888–1898. De kjøbenhavnske Sporveje 1898–1911. Københavns Sporveje 1911–1974.	Copenhagen	Accumulator (storage battery)	4 March 1897	15 March 1902	
Trams in Copenhagen. Copenhagen Railway Company 1863-1866. Kjøbenhavns Sporvei-Selskab 1866–1898. Kjøbenhavns Forstæders Sporveisselskab 1872–1898. Sølvgadens Sporvejsselskab 1888–1898. De kjøbenhavnske Sporveje 1898–1911. Københavns Sporveje 1911–1974.	Copenhagen	Electric	19 September 1899	22 April 1972	
Trams in Copenhagen. Copenhagen Railway Company 1863-1866. Kjøbenhavns Sporvei-Selskab 1866–1898. Kjøbenhavns Forstæders Sporveisselskab 1872–1898. Sølvgadens Sporvejsselskab 1888–1898. De kjøbenhavnske Sporveje 1898–1911. Københavns Sporveje 1911–1974.	♦ Hellerup – Charlottenlund – Klampenborg. Strandveiens Dampsporvei Selskab 1884–1893. Hellerup Sporvej 1897–1902. Tuborg-Klampenborg Elektriske Sporvej 1902–1911. Nordsjællands; Elektricitets og Sporvejs Aktieselskab 1911–(1974).	Steam	23 March 1884	1 October 1892	
Trams in Copenhagen. Copenhagen Railway Company 1863-1866. Kjøbenhavns Sporvei-Selskab 1866–1898. Kjøbenhavns Forstæders Sporveisselskab 1872–1898. Sølvgadens Sporvejsselskab 1888–1898. De kjøbenhavnske Sporveje 1898–1911. Københavns Sporveje 1911–1974.	♦ Hellerup – Charlottenlund – Klampenborg. Strandveiens Dampsporvei Selskab 1884–1893. Hellerup Sporvej 1897–1902. Tuborg-Klampenborg Elektriske Sporvej 1902–1911. Nordsjællands; Elektricitets og Sporvejs Aktieselskab 1911–(1974).	Horse	1 June 1897	30 November 1902	
Trams in Copenhagen. Copenhagen Railway Company 1863-1866. Kjøbenhavns Sporvei-Selskab 1866–1898. Kjøbenhavns Forstæders Sporveisselskab 1872–1898. Sølvgadens Sporvejsselskab 1888–1898. De kjøbenhavnske Sporveje 1898–1911. Københavns Sporveje 1911–1974.	♦ Hellerup – Charlottenlund – Klampenborg. Strandveiens Dampsporvei Selskab 1884–1893. Hellerup Sporvej 1897–1902. Tuborg-Klampenborg Elektriske Sporvej 1902–1911. Nordsjællands; Elektricitets og Sporvejs Aktieselskab 1911–(1974).	Electric	1903	1953	
Trams in Copenhagen. Copenhagen Railway Company 1863-1866. Kjøbenhavns Sporvei-Selskab 1866–1898. Kjøbenhavns Forstæders Sporveisselskab 1872–1898. Sølvgadens Sporvejsselskab 1888–1898. De kjøbenhavnske Sporveje 1898–1911. Københavns Sporveje 1911–1974.	Nørrebroes Sporvejsselskab; Nørrebroes Sporvejsselskab 1867–1896.	Steam	1867	1896	
Trams in Copenhagen. Copenhagen Railway Company 1863-1866. Kjøbenhavns Sporvei-Selskab 1866–1898. Kjøbenhavns Forstæders Sporveisselskab 1872–1898. Sølvgadens Sporvejsselskab 1888–1898. De kjøbenhavnske Sporveje 1898–1911. Københavns Sporveje 1911–1974.	Nørrebroes Sporvejsselskab; Nørrebroes Sporvejsselskab 1867–1896.	Electric	1897	1899	
Frederiksberg Sporvej; Frederiksberg Sporvejsselskab 1872–1897. Falkoneralléens Sporvejsselskab 1884–1897. Frederiksberg Sporvejs- og Elektricitets Aktieselskab 1897–1919.	Frederiksberg	Electric			
Nørrebroes Sporvejsselskab	Copenhagen	Steam	1867	1896	
Nørrebros Elektriske Sporvej	Copenhagen	Electric	1897	1899	
Greater Copenhagen Light Rail	Greater Copenhagen/Metropolitan Copenhagen/Copenhagen metropolitan area, Urban area of Copenhagen	Electric. Light rail/Tram-train	2025/2026 26 October 2025 only the south part	-	Fully opened on 22 August 2026
Skjoldenæsholm Tram Museum^{da} and preserved railways^{da} Sporvejshistorisk Selskab	Ringsted	Electric, Accumulator (storage battery), Diesel, oil, steam and horse	1978	-	Gauge: 1,000 mm (3 ft 3 3/8 in) and Gauge: 1,435 mm (4 ft 8 1/2 in) and 750 mm (2 ft 5 1/2 in) and 1.8 km (1.1 mi) and 2.0 km (1.2 mi) Horse-drawn tram/Horse-drawn streetcar/Horse-drawn railway. Heritage tram/Heritage streetcar/Tram/Light rail/Tram-train/Heritage tramway/Translohr/Interurban/Double-decker tram/W-class Melbourne tram, Horsecar, Horse trams, Buses and Trolleybus, Stadler Variobahn, Low-floor tram, Stadler Variobahn, Stadler Tango, Stadler Rail, Alstom Citadis, Flexity Classic, Siemens Avenio, ADtranz low floor tram, Siemens Combino, Types of trams
Rømøbanen	Kongsmark – Lakolk (Rømø island)	Horse	1899	1939	Gauge: 750 mm (2 ft 5 1/2 in)
Odense Sporvej	Odense	Electric	9 September 1911	1 July 1952	
Odense Letbane	Odense	Electric. Light rail/Tram-train	28 May 2022	-	
Bornholms Sporvognstrafik B/S	Østermarie	Electric, Accumulator (storage battery), Diesel, oil, steam and horse	2011	-	Horse-drawn tram/Horse-drawn streetcar/Horse-drawn railway. Heritage tram/Heritage streetcar/Tram/Light rail/Tram-train/Heritage tramway/Translohr/Interurban/Double-decker tram/W-class Melbourne tram, Horsecar, Horse trams, Buses and Trolleybus, Types of trams
