= Aksel Mikkelsen =

Danish educator (1849–1929)

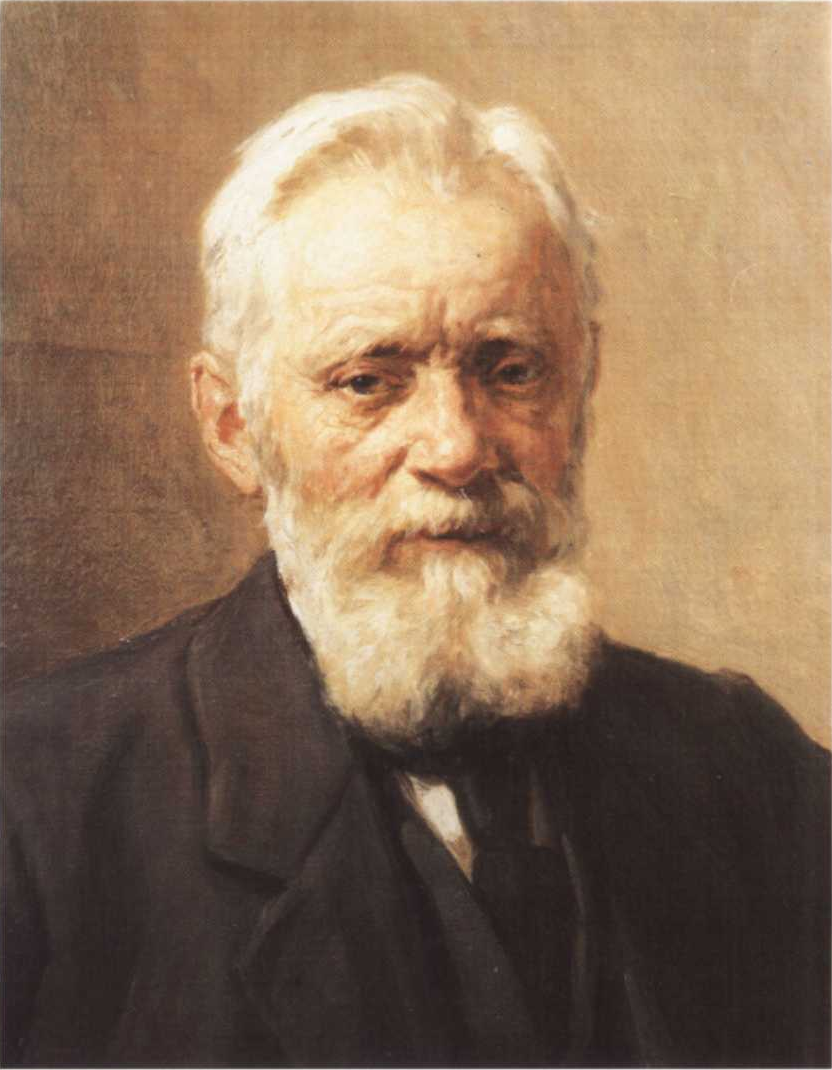

Aksel Mikkelsen (14 August 1849 – 19 October 1929 in Korsør) was a Danish educator who introduced the Swedish system of sloyd schools into Denmark. He organised schools and seminaries on the system, which teaches manual training as an aid in developing the pupils' physically and mentally as well as affording the basis of technical training. Beginning in 1907, he was inspector of the sloyd system in Denmark. He also wrote books.

== Early life and education ==
Aksel Mikkelsen was born on 14 August 1849 in Hjørring, the son of Ane Margr. Pedersdatter and Jørgen Mikkelsen, an iron foundry foreman. As a young man, he lived in Vester Brønderslev where he owned a foundry and a machine workshop. He added an apprentice school to the business, initially to train his own staff, but later expanded it to external pupils. He developed a number of courses as introductions in blacksmithing and carpentry. He then reduced this to woodwork only. Aksel Mikkelsen started to use the term ‘carpentry’ which he picked up in Sweden, where he spent some time at Nääs carpentry school near Gothenburg on a study trip in 1882.

== Career ==
Mikkelsen became interested in education and set up a crafts school at the company. In 1883, he and his young family moved to Næstved on Zealand, where he got a job as head of the technical school and as a carpentry teacher. It was during this time that he rented a building, and set up the first woodworking school in Denmark for children under the age of confirmation. This helped to publicise his theories of teaching and technical training for woodworking.

In 1885, Aksel Mikkelsen moved to Copenhagen. In 1886, he acquired Schneekloth's old school building on Værnedamsvej in Frederiksberg (which today houses the French-language school Lycée Français Prins Henrik) for a woodworking school, Dansk Sløjdlærerskole. The same year, the Danish Woodworking Association was founded with Mikkelsen and Herman Trier as its driving forces.

Mikkelsen was headmaster of the school from 1886-1909, training carpentry teachers. From 1907-1918 he was a carpentry inspector and state supervisor of carpentry teaching in Denmark's schools. From 1914-20 he also supervised soldiers' education in carpentry and technical skills.

Mikkelsen gave Denmark's first two professional female carpenters, Sophy A. Christensen and Cathrine Horsbøl their initial training opportunities, in the late 1880s and early 1890s.

== Publications ==
Hvad er Slojd (1886)

Hvordan arbejder Slojdskolen (1886)

Opdrageren (1891-92)

Slojlære (1894)

Arbejdsstilinger (1896)

== Personal life ==
On 2 March 1873 Mikkelsen married Maren Nielsen, (b. 22 December 1846 in Ryslinge), daughter of Karen Hansdatter and farmer Niels Rasmussen. Their children included polar explorer Ejnar Mikkelsen, and Thorvald Mikkelsen (1885-1962) and author and translator Auslaug Møller (nee Mikkelsen).
