= Cathrine Horsbøl =

Danish carpenter (1872–1947)

Cathrine Mathilde Horsbøl
- Born: 10 June 1872; Ribe
- Died: 4 May 1947; Copenhagen
- Burial place: Solbjerg Park Cemetery
- Known for: One of Denmark's earliest female master carpenters and furniture designers

Cathrine Mathilde Horsbøl (10 June 1872 – 4 May 1947) was one of Denmark's earliest female master carpenters and furniture designers. Always keen to learn carpentry, she joined a workshop in Ribe when she was 13 and trained further at Aksel Mikkelsen's school in Copenhagen. She successfully completed her apprenticeship in 1893. After gaining further experience in Berlin and Paris, in the mid-1890s she opened her own business in Copenhagen, shortly after Sophy A. Christensen opened hers. She worked energetically until 1919 when she sold her business.

== Early life and education ==
Born in Ribe on 10 June 1872, Cathrine Mathilde Horsbøl was the daughter of the teacher Jens Christian Horsbøl (1828–1904) and his wife Cathrine Mathilde née Müller (1834–1876). As a child, she had shown an interest in carpentry and when she was 15 she became an apprentice in Ribe. She then attended Aksel Mikkelsen's carpentry school in Copenhagen before finding a job with the master carpenter Jens Peter Mørck in the Vesterbro district of the city. Her training received financial support from the legacy left by the women's rights activist Marie Rovsing. In 1898, she completed a formal apprenticeship at C.B. Hansen's furniture workshop, receiving a bronze medal for her creations. She enhanced her competence by making study trips to Berlin and Paris where she gained recognition by presenting works at the Exposition des arts de la femme (Women artists exhibition).

== Career ==
In 1895, on her return to Denmark, Horsbøl established her own business on Copenhagen's Valdemarsgade in the house where she lived, shortly after the other Danish female carpentry pioneer, Sophy A. Christensen, had established hers. Horsbøl later moved her workshop to the more central Bredgade where she employed up to 30 people. The items she exhibited in her shop window attracted wide attention, many of them her own creations. Rather heavy in style, they were crafted with great skill with richly decorated elements. She tirelessly devoted her attention to all aspects of then business, taking orders, keeping accounts and rarely taking time off. In 1919, she sold the business and moved to the countryside where she continued her work on a non-commercial bais.

Cathrine Horsbøl died in Copenhagen on 4 May 1947 and is buried in Solbjerg Park Cemetery.

== Legacy ==
A taboret stool made by Cathrine HorsBøl & Co, Copenhagen, c. 1900 was sold by Bukowski's auction house in 2015.
