= Valdemar Riise =

Danish West Indies business owner (1853–1914)

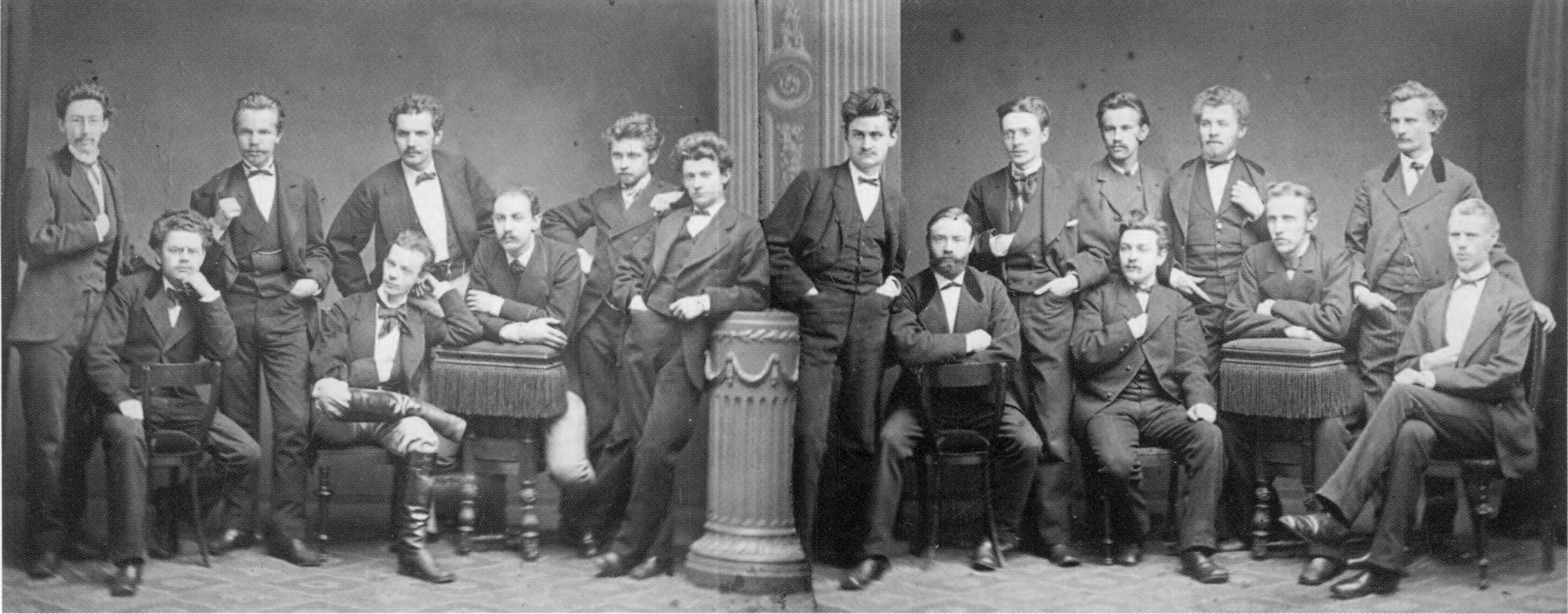
Valdemar Riise University Candidates 1875

Valdemar Riise (1 June 1853 – 10 December 1914), was the proprietor of A.H. Riise Rum and Pharmacy, which was founded by his father Albert Heinrich Riise in 1838 on the island of St. Thomas in the Danish West Indies (known today as the United States Virgin Islands). Valdemar sold the pharmacy in 1913 and returned to Copenhagen because he was suffering from string of disease attacks. After returning to Copenhagen in 1913 he died 1 year after in 1914.

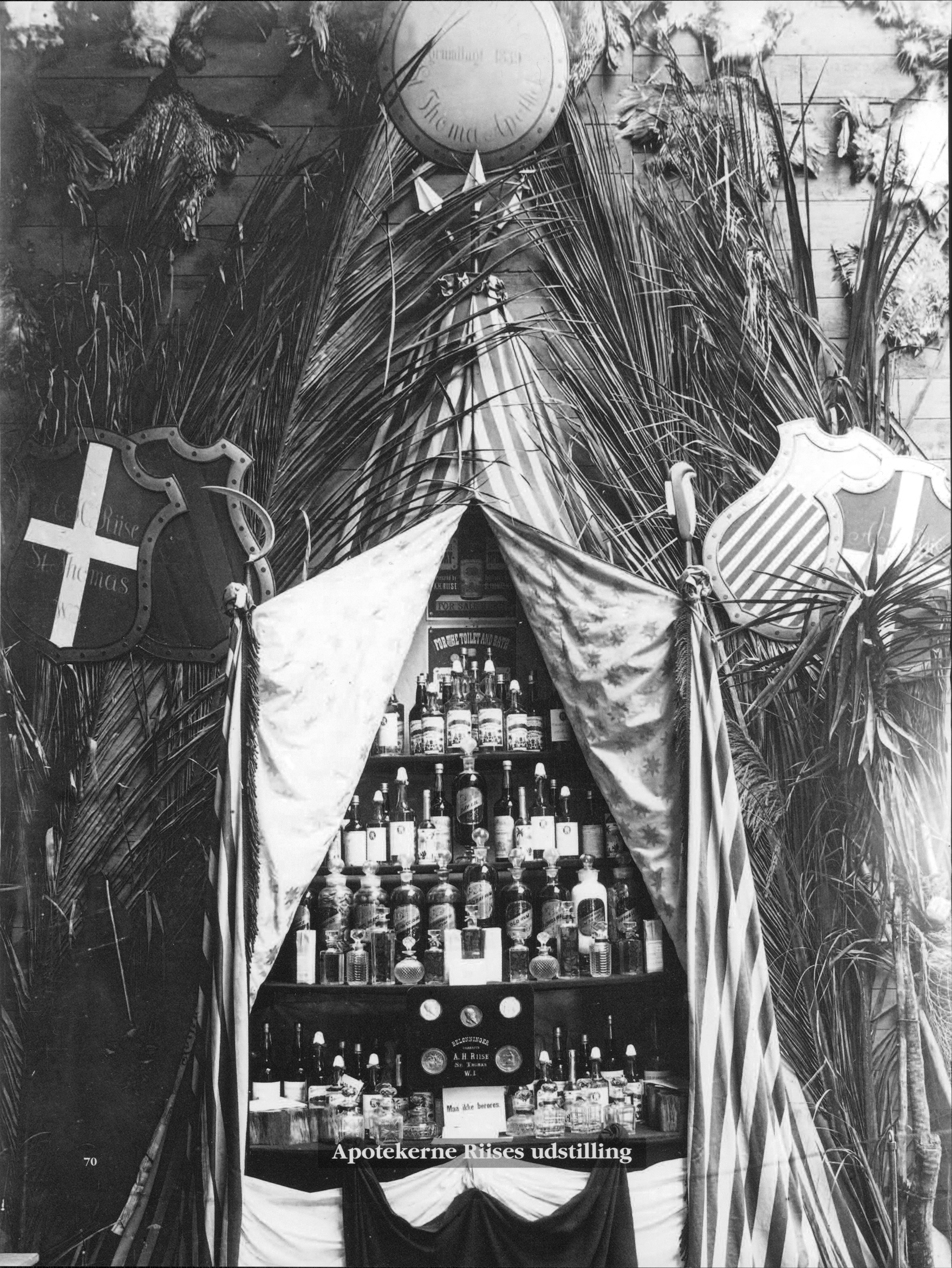
Copenhagen World Exhibition 1888 AH Riise (Company won Gold Medal)

== Biography ==
Valdemar was named Knight of Dannebrog. Knights were asked to write a vitae and Valdemar Riise's vitae dated September 24th 1907.

King Haakon of Norway appointed Valdemar Riise as Norwegian consul in the Danish West Indies, and in 1912 Valdemar Riise was honored with the Norwegian St. Olav's Order of 1st class, which is awarded as "reward for excellent merits of the fatherland and humanity".

King Haakon the 7th of Norway started his life as Prince Carl of Denmark. He built up his career in the Royal Danish Navy, which led to him serving on the vessel, Fregatten Jylland. The national treasure “Frigate Jylland” – which shares its name with another variation of A.H. Riise NAVY Rum– led the prince to the West Indian Isles. Here he met Valdemar Riise, son of A.H. Riise.

King Haakon and Riise established a close friendship over the years and enjoyed each other’s company on several occasions when King Haakon visited the A.H. Riise Pharmacy and Riise’s private home. The friendship began when the then Prince Karl served on the frigates Jutland and Fyen, acting as maritime protection vessels in the Danish West Indies and which frequently moored off Saint Thomas.
