= Albert Heinrich Riise =

Danish pharmacist (1810–1882)

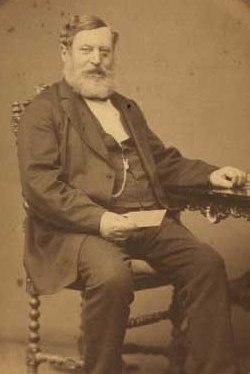
A. H. Riise, c. 1870

Albert Heinrich Riise (11 September 1810 – 18 October 1882), often referred to as A. H. Riise, was a Danish pharmacist, merchant and manufacturer of rum on Saint Thomas in the Danish West Indies. A brand of rum is still named A.H. Riise after him. Late in his life he returned to Denmark, where Sankt Thomas Plads (St. Thomas Square) in the Frederiksberg district of Copenhagen is named after his former country house. He was the father of photographer Frederik Riise.

== Early life and education ==
Riise was the son of skipper and merchant Jens Christian Riise (1773–1814) and wife Margrethe Elisabeth Krabbe (1779–1869). The father died at sea when his ship sank during a storm. After schooling, Albert was apprenticed at the pharmacist in Ærøskøbing and from 1825 to 1830 he continued at the pharmacist in Fåborg. He then traveled to Copenhagen, where he graduated in 1832. While still studying botany and chemistry, he worked at various pharmacies in the capital at the same time.

== Pharmacist on St. Thomas ==
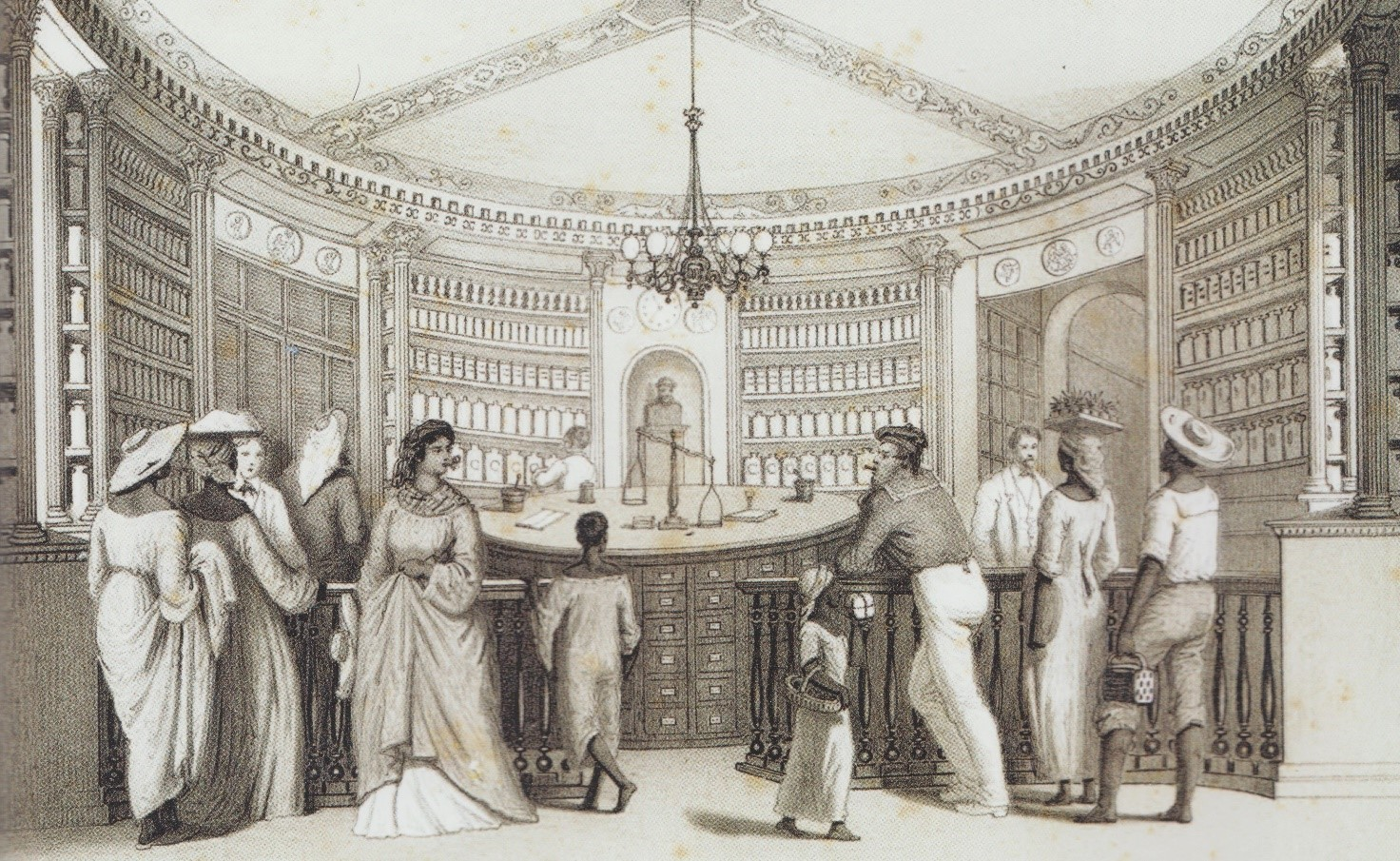
Riise's pharmacy on Dronningensgade in Charlotte Amalie.

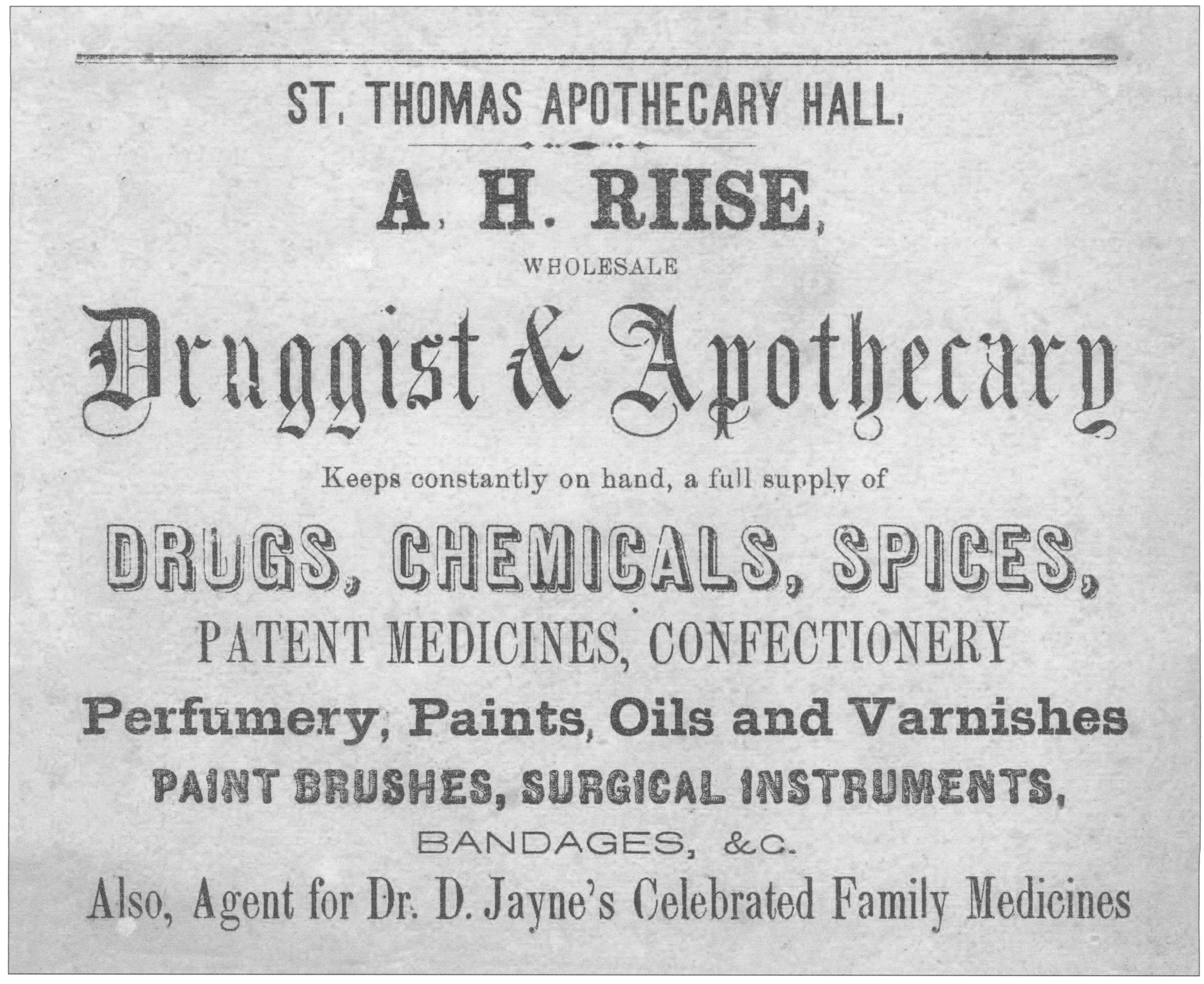
A. H. Riise druggist certificate

A long-cherished desire to get to the West Indies was fulfilled in 1838 when he managed to get the privilege as a pharmacist in the Danish West Indies. Upon arrival in Saint Thomas, he at first worked in a so-called doctor stall, driven by several doctors. The following year he established his own pharmacy in partnership with a doctor. In 1843, he was able to buy out the partner, so he became the sole owner of the pharmacy. It went well for Riise and his business grew; he travelled to the United States and Trinidad, among other countries.

Equipped with a large stock of all kinds of goods, especially pharmaceutical products, St. Thomas Pharmacy became known throughout the surrounding Caribbean islands as the place where anything one might need for any household was to be obtained.

Riise had a lively interest in botany and with utilized Caribbean exotic plants and animal life for the preparation of pharmaceutical, cosmetic and alcoholic products. He collected a great deal of herpetological and other zoological specimens, which were sent to Copenhagen and other European museums. The Danish zoologists Johannes Theodor Reinhardt and Christian Frederik Lütken were preparing a great monograph on the amphibians and reptiles of the Danish West Indies and the wider Caribbean, much of it based on the extensive collections of Riise. Unfortunately for them, however, the young American Edward Drinker Cope found a number of Riise's (he thought the man was called Rüse) specimens from the Danish West Indies of the species that they were in the process of describing which had been sent to America. He rushed to describe them for posterity himself, publishing his work in 1862 a week or two earlier than them, which necessitated a rash of last-minute changes to their manuscript before it could be brought to the printers.

== Manufacturer of rum ==
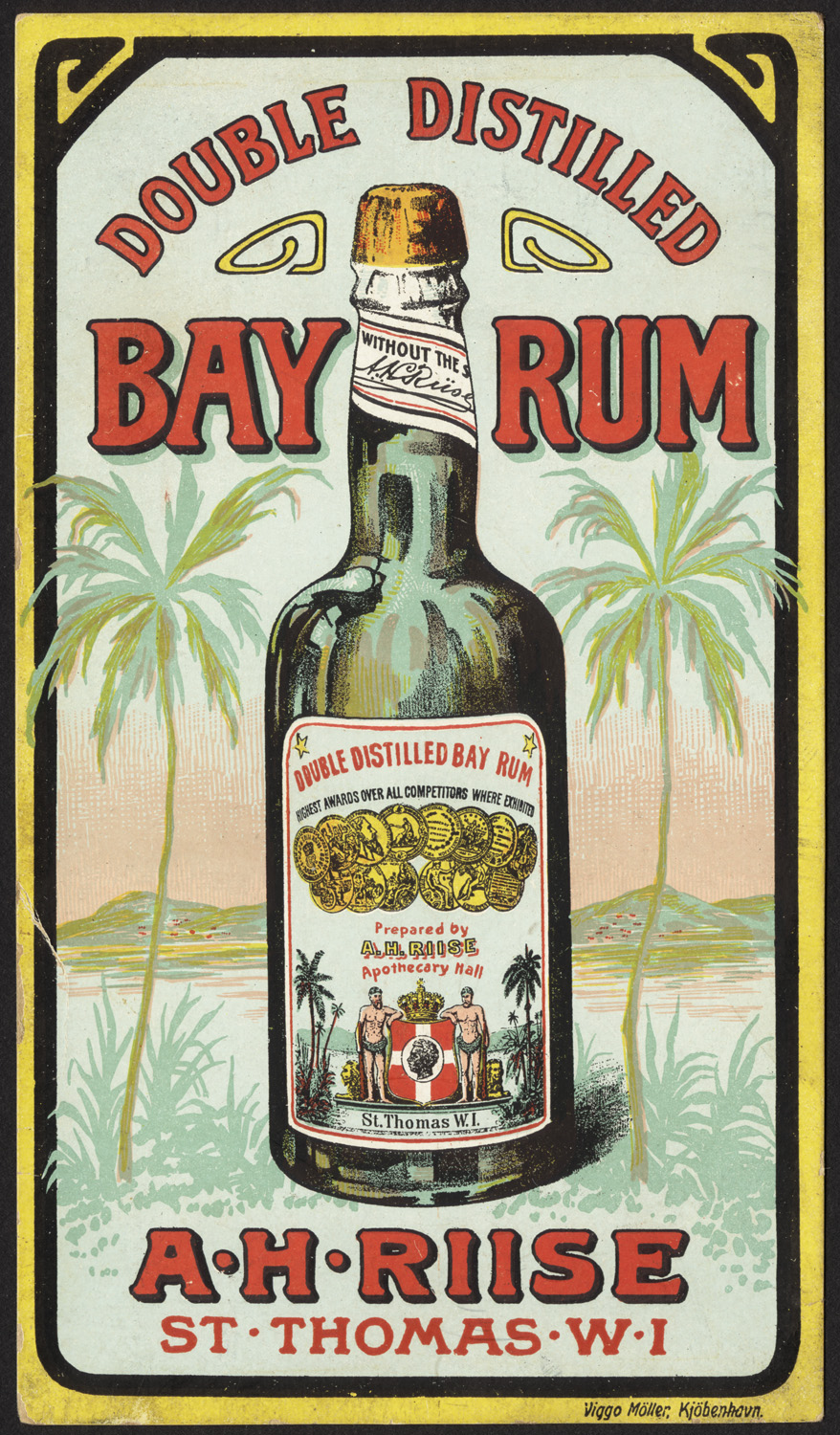
Advertisement for AH Riise double distilled bay rum

Among other things Riise's Bay Rum (a bay rum is rum scented with oil of Pimenta racemosa) was strongly instrumental in Riise's later prosperity. Riise was also successful in the distillation and sale of bitters from the West Indies, which at the time were used as a medicine for stomach ills and other hardships. Riise had great success with his West Indies rum, which was exported to several continents. Riise's rum was especially popular in the motherland of Denmark.

His rum has been marketed under various trademarks including Old St. Croix Brand, Riise's Guava rum and A.H. Riise rum. A series of rum from the Caribbean attributed to Riise is still marketed by Dansk-Vestindisk Rom Kompagni.

A company exploiting one of these trademarks was awarded a medal at the World's Columbian Exposition in Chicago in 1893, after his death.

== Return to Denmark ==
When there were epidemics of cholera, yellow fever, and smallpox in 1868, the family decided to travel to Denmark for a year. However, when the year was over, they decided to stay. The pharmacy on St. Thomas was handed over to an assistant who married one of Riise's daughters. A son of this connection later became a pharmacist in Ærøskøbing.

Albert Riise bought a villa at Frederiksberg Allé, which he named Sankt Thomas. When the villa was sold after Riise's death in 1882, it was transformed into an amusement park called St. Thomas.

In addition, Albert Riise was director of the Bank of St. Thomas, and was appointed knight of Dannebrog, knight of the Swedish Order of Vasa, in 1868 for Council of Justice and in 1878 for etatsråd.

He is buried at Solbjerg Park Cemetery. A commemorative plaque has been set for him at his birthplace in Ærøskøbing.

== Personal life ==
On 27 January 1842, in Frederiksted on St. Croix, he married Henriette Marie Worm (1821–1889). The couple had 13 children, including photographer Frederik Riise and pharmacist Valdemar Riise who was the proprietor of the pharmacy after him.
