= Odense Light Rail =

Tram system in Odense, Denmark

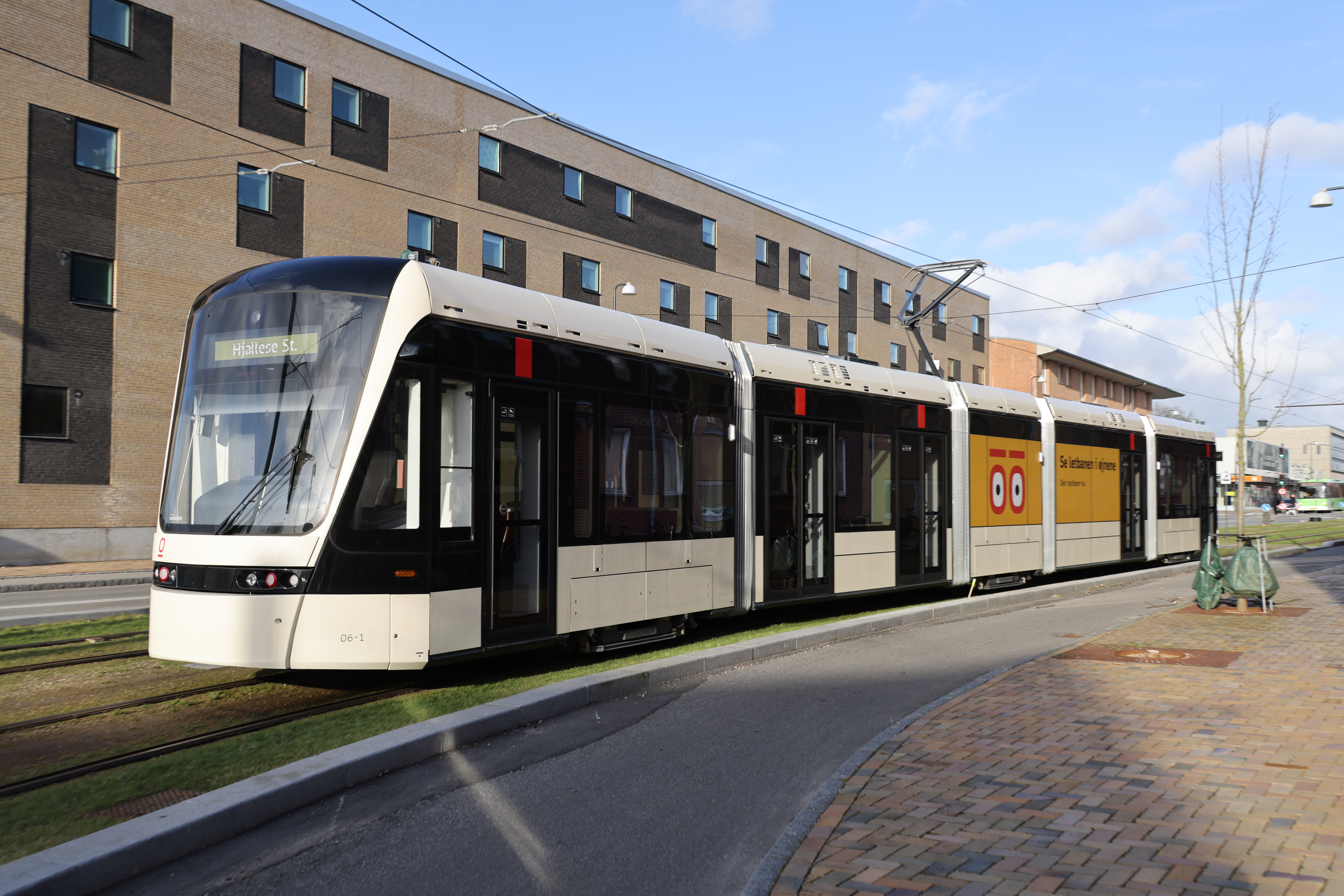
- A Stadler Variobahn tram at Vestre Stationsvej

Overview
- Native name: Odense Letbane
- Owner: Odense Municipality
- Area served: Odense, Denmark
- Transit type: Light rail
- Number of lines: 1
- Number of stations: 26
- Annual ridership: 7,389,000 (2025)
- Website: www.odenseletbane.dk/english

Operation
- Began operation: 28 May 2022
- Operator: Keolis
- Number of vehicles: 16

Technical
- System length: 14.5 km (9.0 mi)
- Track gauge: 1,435 mm (4 ft 8 1/2 in) standard gauge
- Electrification: 750 V DC overhead
- Top speed: 70 km/h (43 mph)
System map
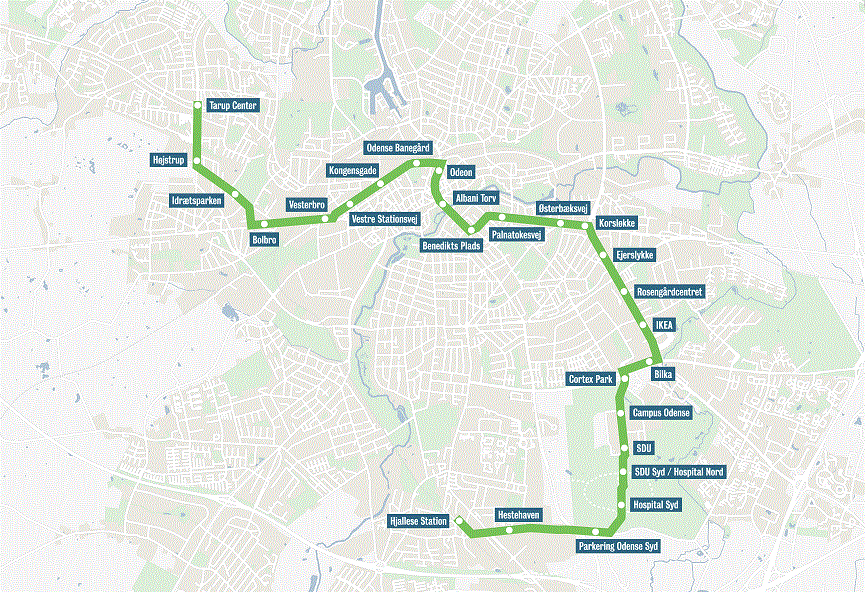

The Odense Light Rail (Danish: Odense Letbane) is a tram system in Odense, Denmark. The first phase opened on 28 May 2022. The tramway starts in Tarup, in the north-western part of Odense, and travels via the central train station, University of Southern Denmark, and the new hospital before reaching its final destination in Hjallese, in the southernmost part of the city. The first line consists of 14.5 kilometres (9.0 mi) of tracks and has 26 stations, and is expected to carry 34,000 passengers daily. The project's total budget is 3.6 billion Danish krone (2026 numbers). The tramway is financed by the Odense Municipality, the Danish State, and the Region of Southern Denmark.

The Odense city council has begun to plan a second line consisting of 7.5 kilometres (4.7 mi) of tracks with a budget of 1.9 billion Danish krone, however the plan has not received regulatory approval or co-financing from the Danish state as of August 2018.

== History ==
=== The political process ===
The tramway in Odense was first proposed in 2008 by then mayor, Jan Boye. Subsequently, the Odense Municipality and the Region of Southern Denmark began the initial planning stages of the project with unanimous support from the city council. A formal agreement between the State, the Region of Southern Denmark and Odense Municipality, signed 23 June 2014, represented a commitment to financial support for the tramway project.

On 5 February 2015, the project was approved by the Danish parliament, allowing for the formation of a construction company, Odense Letbane P/S, to begin work on the tramway.

=== Planning ===
In August 2012, the competition for the design of the Odense Tramway was won by a team consisting of Niras, PLH Architects, Atelier Villes & Paysages and MBD Design. The team was awarded a contract to create a plan of the tramway line's first stage of 14.5 kilometres (9.0 mi), as well as its integration in the existing urban environment.

In March 2015, Parsons Brinckerhoff was awarded the contract for project management and economic advice. COWI was selected as the project's technical advisor.

=== Construction ===
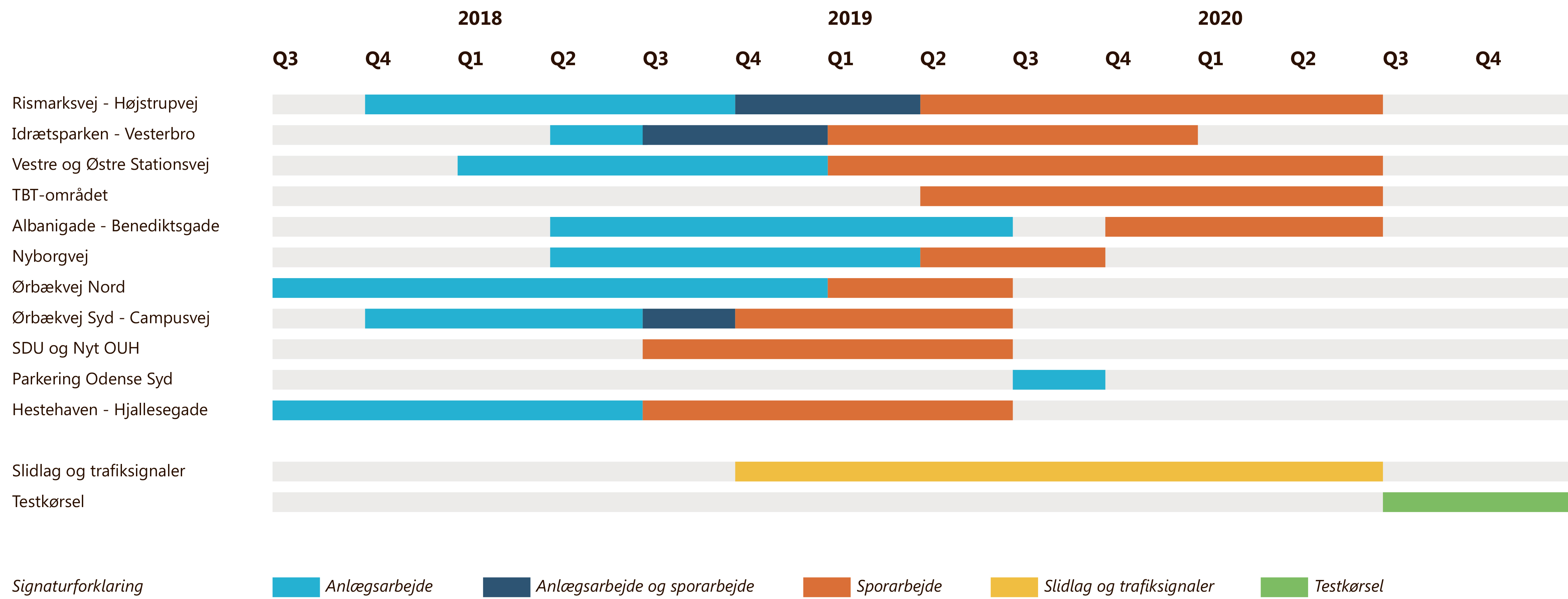
Construction timeline chart of the light rail

All utility piping and cables in the path of the tramway were excavated and moved before construction work on the line began. These works lasted from April 2015 to December 2017.

To accommodate the tramway, it was necessary to relocate existing roads and bike lanes in order to provide the eight meter (twenty-six foot) clearance required to construct the tramway tracks. This work, carried out by Danish contractors Arkil, M.J Eriksson, and Barslund, began in August 2017 and construction of replacement roads and bike lanes continued until spring of 2019. In next phase, Spanish contractor COMSA, in collaboration with subcontractors Munck (of Denmark), EFACEC (of Portugal), and IDOM (of Spain) constructed foundations, drainage, and cables before laying tracks. The final part of the project, the test and trial run of the tramway, was carried out during 2019 and 2020 by the assigned operator, who is also in charge of maintenance. The contract for operation and maintenance was expected to be closed by the end of 2018. The Swiss-German tram company Stadler Pankow delivered 16 trams of the model Variobahn for the project. The first tram was delivered in February 2020.

=== Future lines and expansions ===
New expansions:

Odense Centrum to Vollsmose.

Line 1: Korsløkke - Ejbygade - Granparken - Lærkeparken - Vollsmose Torv - Egeparken - Bøgeparken - Birkeparken - Hybenhaven - Seden. Seden - Munkebo - Kerteminde.

Line 2: Sukkerkogeriet - Odense Zoo. Sukkerkogeriet - Dalum - Tommerup - Glamsbjerg.

Line 3: Søndersø – Tarup.

== Operation ==
A tram running in grassed track on Højstrupvej

According to the current schedule, the tram runs daily from 05:00 until 24:00 on weekdays and until 01:00 on weekends. During working hours, the tram runs every 7.5 minutes, and during evenings, it runs every 15 minutes. Runtime between the two terminals is 42 minutes. The average speed is roughly 20.7 km/h (12.9 mph).

== Ridership ==
Annual passenger numbers
Year	Annual passenger number
2022	3,278,000
2023	5,809,000
2024	6,937,000
2025	7,389,000

== Rolling stock ==
One of the fleet's Stadler Variobahn LRVs (light rail vehicles)

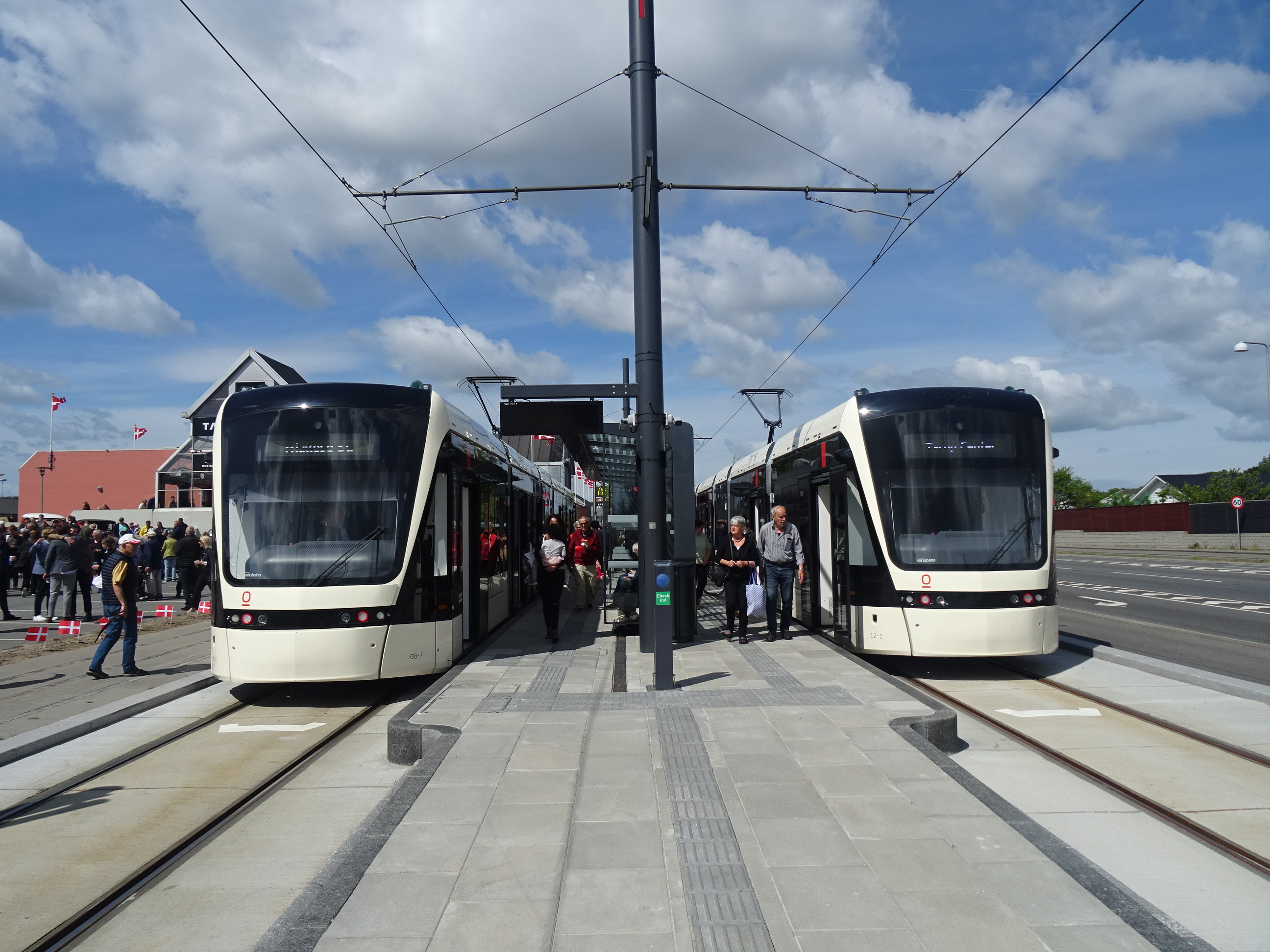
Two cars passing on opening day in 2022

An LRV leaving Albani Torv on opening day

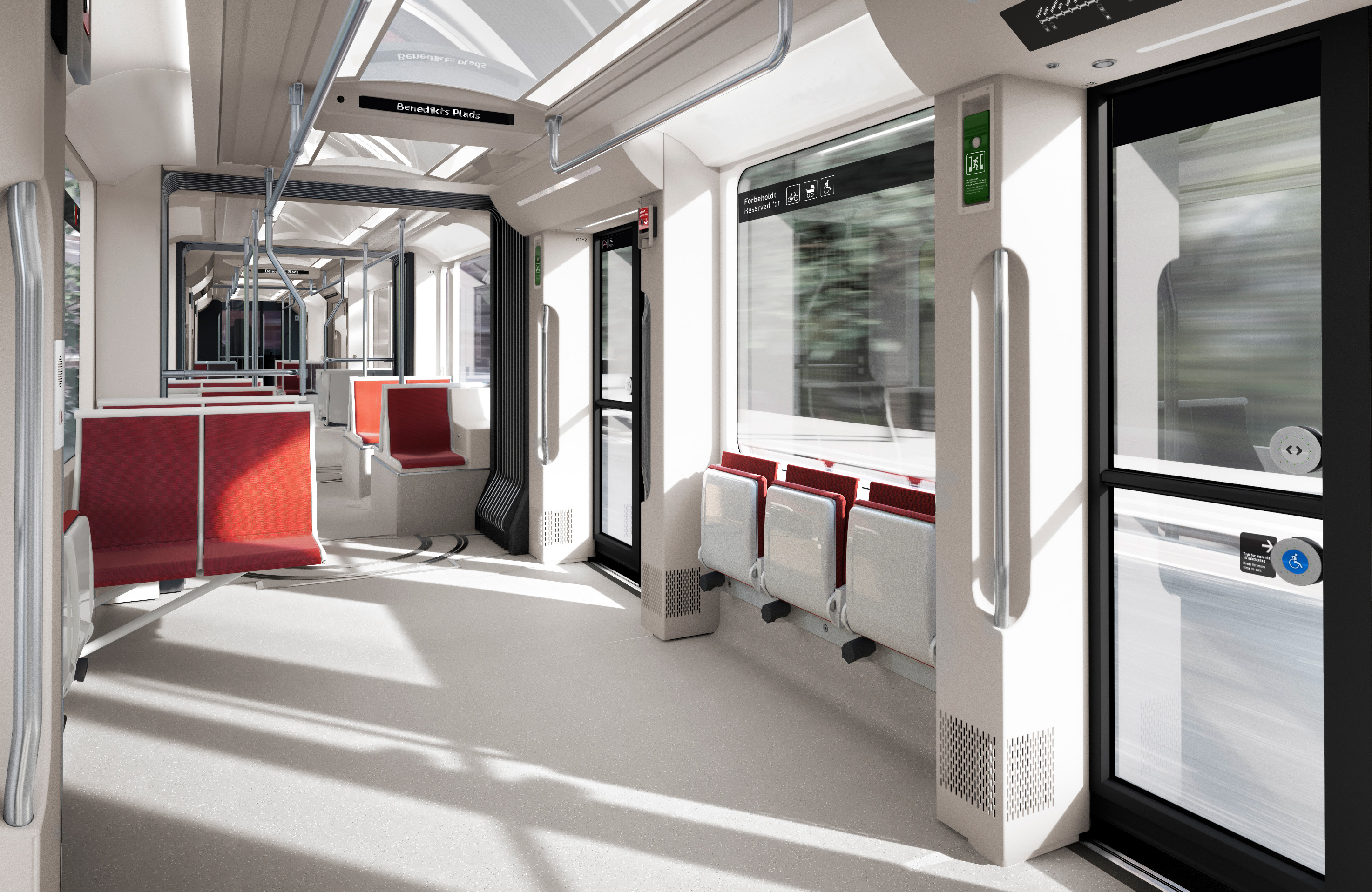
Interior of a Variobahn LRV

== See also ==
- Aarhus Letbane
- Greater Copenhagen Light Rail
- List of town tramway systems in Denmark
