= Schneekloths Skole =

School in Copenhagen, existing from 1854 until 1992

Coordinates: 55°40′27″N 12°32′54″E

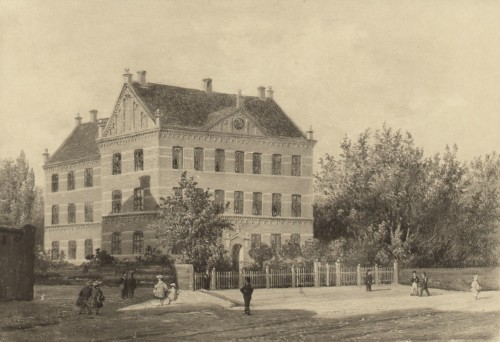
Schneekloths Skole in 1904

Schneekloths Skole was a school which under changing names existed between 1854 and 1992 in Copenhagen, Denmark. Its former premises on Værnedamsvej in Frederiksberg now houses the French-language school Lycée Français Prins Henrik.

== History ==
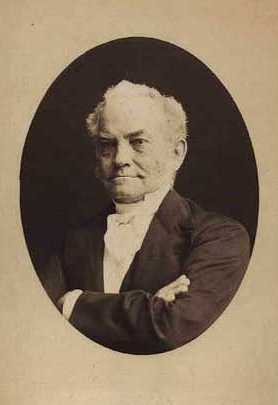
Hans Schneekloth

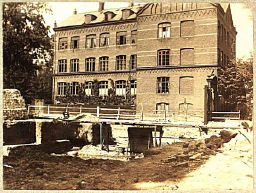
The school's first building which from 1886 housed Dansk Sløjdskole

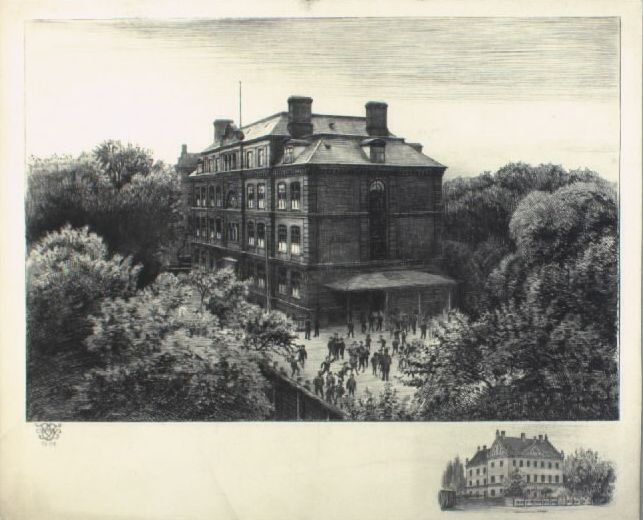
The second building from 1885, drawing from 1904

The school was founded by Hans Schneekloth on 2 May 1854 as "Realskolen for Frederiksberg og Vesterbro". It was initially based on Vesterbrogade, but a new, purpose-built school building on Værnedamsvej (No. 13B) was inaugurated in 1856. It was soon expanded with a grammar school whose first students graduated in 1863. The name of the school was changed to "Schneekloths Latin- og Realskole" in 1882. It moved to a new building away from the street on the same lot (No. 13A) in 1885. Its old building (No. 13B) was purchased by Aksel Mikkelsen and turned into a teacher training college under the name Dansk Sløjdlærerskole in 1886.

In 1904 Schneekloths Skole was merged with Hertz' Forberedelsesskole (formerly Phillippavej Skole) under the name "Schneekloths Latin- og Realskole og Hertz forberedelsesskole".

On 1 August 1919 the grammar school (latin- og realskolen) was taken over by the state under the name Svanholm Gymnasium-Schneekloths Skole, while the primary school remained a private school. In 1930 the name of the secondary school was changed to Statsgymnasiet Schneekloths Skole. It was a boys' school until 1969 when it moved to Brøndbyerne. Im 1986, it was taken over by Copenhagen County under the name Schneekloths Gymnasium. It closed in 1992.

== Alumni ==
- 1870s: Georg Achen, painter (preliminary exam)
- 1894: Johannes Schmidt, scientist
- 1899: Harald Giersing, painter
- 1920: Jens Peter Larsen, music researcher
- 1945: Frank Jæger, poet
- 1965: Keld Heick, musician
- 1976: Lars Barfoed, politician
- Michael Laudrup, footballer
- Brian Laudrup, footballer
