= Kjøbenhavns Sporvei-Selskab =

Former operator of tramways in Copenhagen, Denmark

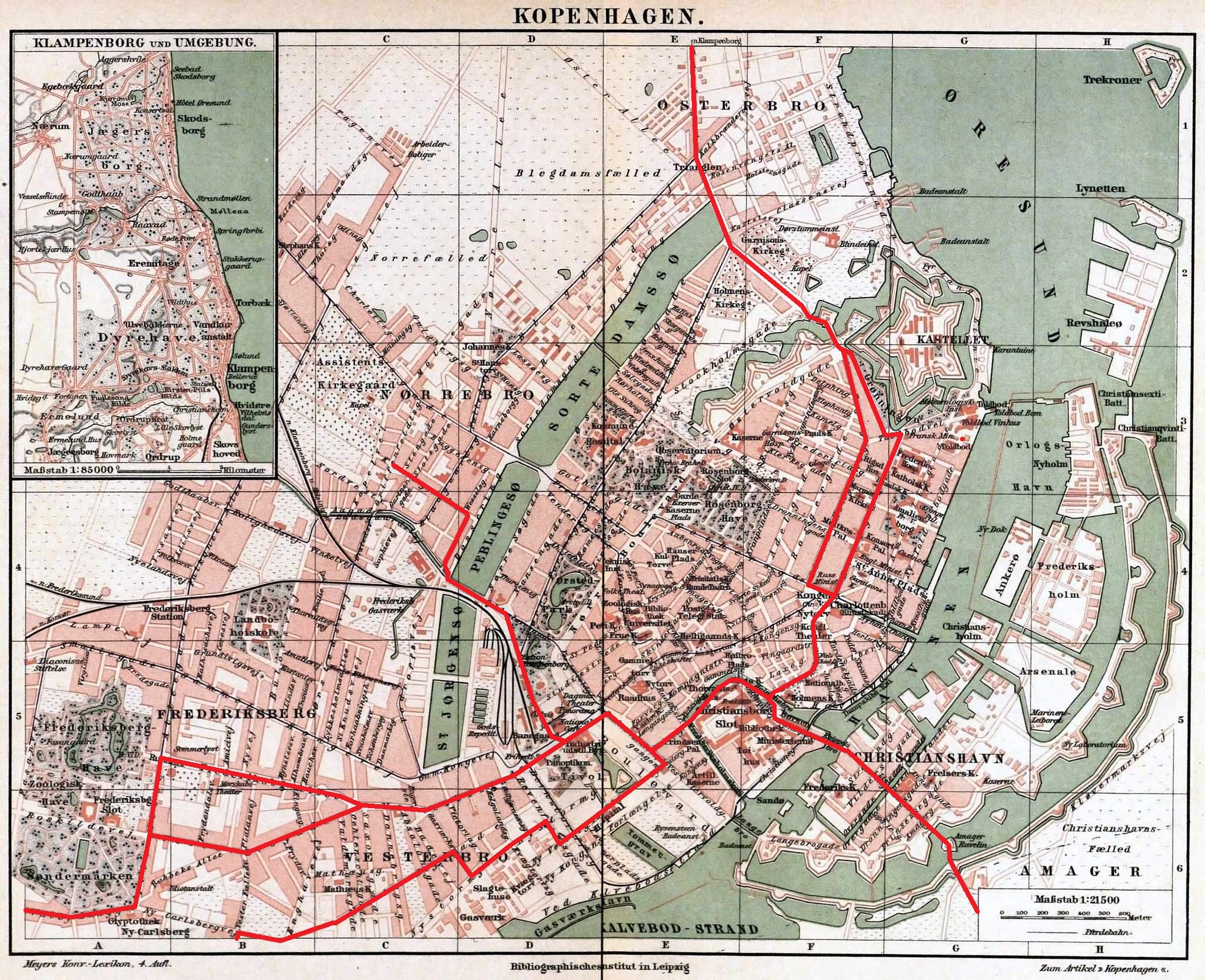
Route network

Kjøbenhavns Sporvei-Selskab (KSS) was an operator of tramways in Copenhagen, Denmark.

== History ==
Kjøbenhavns Sporvei-Selskab was founded by C. F. Tietgen in 1865 as a replacement of the UK-owned Copenhagen Railway Company, which had opened Copenhagen's first tram line in 1863 but had been liquidated. It developed into the largest operator of tram lines in the city before it was merged with four other companies under the name De kjøbenhavnske Sporveje on 1 August 1898.

== Depots ==
- Allégade
- Augustagade
- Frederiksberg Allé
- Gartnergade
- Nordre Frihavnsgade
- Slukefter
- Valby
- Vester Fælledvej

== Lines ==
Name	Established	Route	Ref
Main Line		Frederiksberg Runddel, Jernporten, Vesterbros Torv, Vesterbrogade, Rådhuspladsen, Vester Voldgade, Stormgade, Vindebrogade, Christiansborg, Holmens Kanal, Kongens Nytorv, Sankt Annæ Plads, Bredgade, Grønningen, Østerport, Østerbrogade, Trianglen	Ref
Sorte Hest Line; Sorte Hest linjen	18 November 1867	Frederiksberg Runddel, Pile Allé, Slotskroen, Vesterbrogade at Værnedamsvej, Vesterbrogade at Helgolandsgade, Holmens Kanal, Kongens Nytorv	Ref
Slukefter Kune; Slukefter linjen	June 1868	Trianglen, Østerbrogade, Svanemøllen	Ref
Korsgade Line; Korsgade linjen	19 May 1868	Korsgade, Ladegaardsvej, Vester Farimagsgade/Copenhagen Central Station, Axeltorv, Vesterbrogade, Rådhuspladsen, Vester Voldgade/Stormgade, Vindebrogade, Holmens Kanal, Kongens Nytorv	Ref
Sybdvt Kube	19 December 1872	Kongens Nytorv, Christiansborg Slotsplads, Slotsholmsgade, Knippelsbro, Christianshavns Torv, Ravelinen, Amagerbrogade, Englandsvej	Ref
Store Kongensgade Line; St. Kongensgade linjen	11 July 1877	Kongens Nytorv, Store Kongensgade, Østerbrogade, Trianglen	Ref
Istedgade Line; Istedgade linjen	8 October 1893	Vindebrogade, Tietgensgade, Halmtorvet, Vesterfælledvej. Vestre Cemetery	Ref
Valby Line; Valby linjen	1 June 1894	Vesterbrogade, Pile Allé, Valby Langgade	Ref

== See also ==
- Kjøbenhavns Forstæders Sporveisselskab
