= Trams in Copenhagen =

Danish tramway network

Copenhagen tramway network
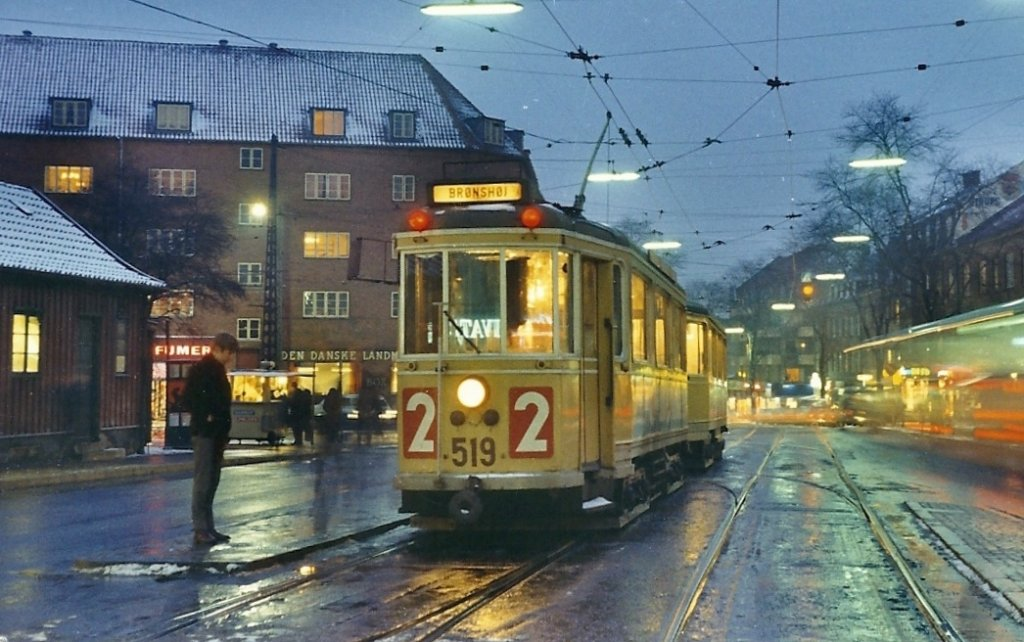
- Brønshøj Torv, 7 February 1969.

Operation
- Locale: Copenhagen, Denmark
- Open: 1863
- Close: 1972
- Status: Closed
- Routes: 18
- Operator: Københavns Sporveje (KS) from 1911 (merged into Hovedstadsområdets Trafikselskab (HT) in 1974)

Infrastructure
- Track gauge: 1,435 mm (4 ft 8 1/2 in) standard gauge

Statistics
- Route length: 99.8 km (62.0 mi) (at peak)
Overview
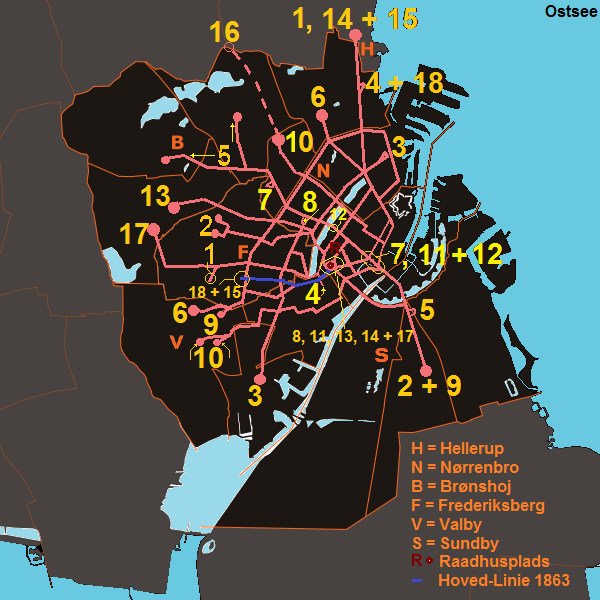
Copenhagen tramway network, 1920.

The Copenhagen tram system was a tramway network in service from 22 October 1863 - 22 April 1972 in and around Copenhagen, Denmark. The first lines were horse-drawn trams which were replaced in the 1880s by steam-powered tramways. In the 1890s electrical trams were introduced. The trams were operated by a number of private companies until 1911 when the city took over the operation of most of the system, followed by a full take-over some years later.

The system was closed on 22 April 1972, at a time when streetcar systems across Europe and North America were being closed because they were not seen as a modern transportation solution and they were largely replaced by buses and private cars. Copenhagen also had an expanding commuter rail service, the S-train, which had expanded greatly over the preceding decades.

Teddy Østerlin Koch has since argued that the removal of the trams was a mistake, as modernised trams were more economical than reported in the city's evaluations of the time, and that an updated tram system would have been cheaper, more timely, better for the environment, and more effective at transporting large volumes of passengers than the solutions eventually implemented: building a Copenhagen metro (opened 30 years after closure of tram system) and expanding the bus network.

A few historical tram units were preserved and can be viewed at various Danish museums.

== Reopening ==
After a 40-year absence, a new light rail line in Copenhagen between Lundtofte and Ishøj began partial operation in October 2025, and full operation in August 2026.

== See also ==
- Transport in Copenhagen
- History of trams
- Kjøbenhavns Sporvei-Selskab
