= Lycée Français Prins Henrik =

Location
- Rolighedsvej 39; Frederiksberg, Denmark, 1958; Denmark; 55.684487°N 12.545307°E

Information
- School type: Private
- Established: 1954
- President: Gösta Schwarck
- Rector: Timothée Léridon
- Grades: 1 - 12
- Gender: Mixed
- Enrolment: 800+ (2026)
- Website: Website

Lycée Français Prins Henrik (Danish: Prins Henriks Skole) is a French international school in central Copenhagen, Denmark. Located in the municipality of Frederiksberg, it serves levels primaire (primary school) through lycée (senior high school).

== History ==
A small school known as the "Little Embassy School" opened in association with the French Embassy on Dag Hammerskjölds allé in 1954. A committee of French and Danish parents was established in 1963 and the school moved to larger premises on Blegdamsvej and became a self-owning institution in 1967. In 1969, the school had 110 students and introduced a sixth grade for the first time.

In 1973 the school moved to a new building on Frederiksberg Allé (No. 16) after the number of students had grown to 230. The first "terminale" class to take their exams in Copenhagen graduated in 1977. Two years later, when the school celebrated its 25-year anniversary, it changed its name to Lycée Français. By 1984 the number of students had grown to more than 320 and in 1989 it adopted its current name in honour of Henrik, Prince Consort of Denmark.

In 1992, Lycée Français Prins Henrik moved to the former premises of Schneekloth's School at Frederiksberg Allé 22. By 2004 the number of students exceeded 500 representing 38 nationalities. In 2005 the school was expanded with a building on Værnedamsvej (No. 13) on the other side of the block.

In 2023, a move was made into new buildings at Rolighedsvej 39, 1868 Frederiksberg.

== Student body ==
In 2011 the school had over 700 students from 40 countries. In 2014, the school had 800 students. Students take part in the decision making at the school thanks to the Student Council. Students are elected to seat at the council for a two-year mandate. This shows that students at this Lycée are pushed to implicate themselves as much as possible in the betterment of society.

== List of Principals & Board Chairmen ==
Year	Principal	Board Chairman
1954	Mlle Charvet (unofficiel)	M. Jacques Révil initiates: shared chairmanship between Mrs Christiansen, Mr. Jean Pierre Desfarges, Mrs Isabelle Polet and Mr Jacques Qvistgaard Frantz Dahl (1st Chairman as of 1967)
1969	Lizette Bergonzat (første officielle rektor)	Jacques Qvistgaard (1969-1973)
1974	Jean Morel	Henrik Dige (1973-1975)
1977	Thèrèse Coutin	Henrik Dige (1973-1975) Henning Palludan (1976) Jean-Louis Biette (1977-1982)
1980	Thèrèse Coutin	Jean-Louis Biette (1977-1982) Flemming Borreskov (1983-1985)
1984	Francis Dol	Flemming Borreskov (1983-1985) Anders Torbøl (1986 - 1994)
1987	Laure Merchadou	Anders Torbøl (1986 - 1994)
1991	Jean-Louis Luciani	Anders Torbøl (1986 - 1994) Nils Bechsgaard (Aug 1994 - Aug 1998)
1995	Marie-Hélène Sarrat	Nils Bechsgaard (Aug 1994 - Aug 1998)
1996	Claude Jérôme	Nils Bechsgaard (Aug 1994 - Aug 1998)
1997	Monique Stephen	Nils Bechsgaard (Aug 1994 - Aug 1998) Jean-Paul Guilbert (Aug 1998 - Sep 2001)
2001	Alain Voldoire	Jean-Paul Guilbert (Aug 1998 - Sep 2001) Karen Larsen (Aug 2002 - 2008)
2006	Evelyne Kendzior-Pellereau	Karen Larsen (Aug 2002 - 2008)
2009	Bernard Luyckx	Karen Larsen (Aug 2002 - 2008) Selma Ravn (Nov 2008 - Oct 2011)
2011	Angèle Direnberger	Maria Fontanet (Oct 2011 - Oct 2013) Catherine Van Lingen (Oct 2013 - Oct 2014)
2014	Michel Chesne	Jean-Thomas Meyer (Oct 2014 - Oct 2017) Anne-Claire Mulot (Nov 2017 - Oct 2020)
2019	Karine Vittaz	Elhadi M'Barek (Nov 2020 - Oct 2021) Valerie Houle (Nov 2021 - Dec 2022) Edith Svebølle (Jan 2023 - Nov 2023)
2023	Michael Mocka	Gösta Schwarck (As of Dec 2023)
2026	Timothée Léridon	Gösta Schwarck (As of Dec 2023)
