= Sophy A. Christensen =

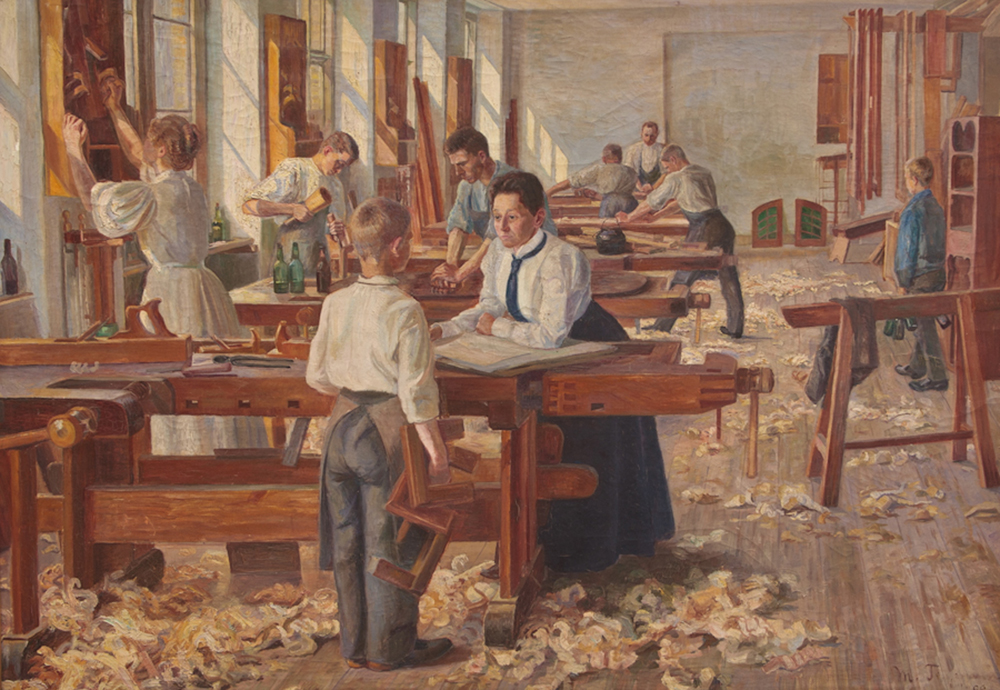
Painting by Maria Thymann of Sophy Christensen in her workshop

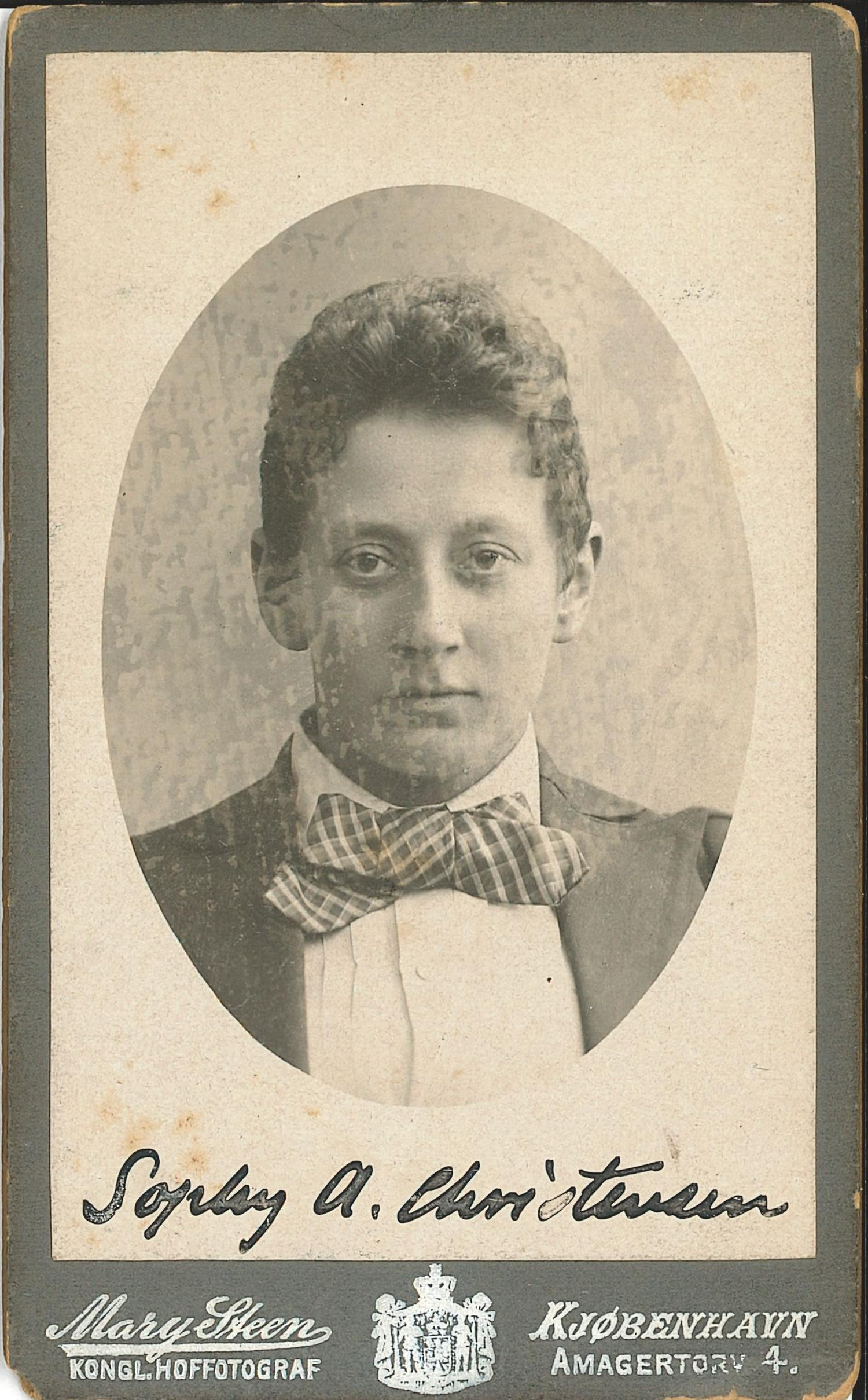
Sophy A. Christensen

Sophie (Sophy) Adolfine Christensen (10 January 1867 – 31 July 1955) was one of Denmark's earliest female master carpenters and furniture designers. Thanks in part to the support she received from the Danish Women's Society, she successfully completed her apprenticeship as a furniture maker in 1893 and attended the Chicago World Fair the same year. In 1895, she opened her own business in Copenhagen. After heading the Industrial Design School for Women from 1907 to 1916, she devoted the rest of her active life to running her own business.

== Early life ==
Born in Holbæk on 10 January 1867, Sophie Adolfine Christensen was the eldest daughter of the five children of Frederik Adolph Christensen (1833–1899), a sea captain, and his wife Christiane née Andersen (1841–1884). When she was 13, her father was seriously injured in a shipwreck and was no longer able to work. The family moved to Copenhagen where her mother valiantly supported the family by taking on a variety of jobs. Sophy was sent off to Jutland where she worked as a housemaid. When her mother died three years later, she returned to Copenhagen to look after her younger siblings.

== Career ==
In 1888, Christensen worked for a woman who ran an embroidery business but earned very little. After her younger brother suggested she should take a carpentry course to improve her earnings, she took a three-month course at Aksel Mikkelsen's school and advanced quickly. It was unusual for women to work as carpenters at the time but thanks to one Mikkelsen, she came into contact with the Women's Society where the activist Emmy Kramp provided her with financial support and encouragement. In 1890, she succeeded in embarking on a training apprenticeship as a cabinet maker which she completed successfully in 1883. As a result, she was able to visit that year's World Fair in Chicago. She also widened her experience by travelling to France and Italy.

In 1885, Christensen was able to open a furniture workshop in Copenhagen, the first woman to do so. From 1907 to 1916, she headed the Industrial Design School for Women but then returned to her business.

Sophy Christensen died in Copenhagen on 31 July 1955 and is buried in Bispebjerg Cemetery.

== Publications ==
- Christensen, Sophy A., Jeg vilde frem! Ungdoms Oplevelser af Danmarks første kvindelige Møbelsnedker (I wanted to succeed! Early experiences of Denmark's first female furniture designer), autobiography, 1928
