= Værnedamsvej =

Street in Copenhagen, Denmark

Coordinates: 55.6739°N 12.5499°E

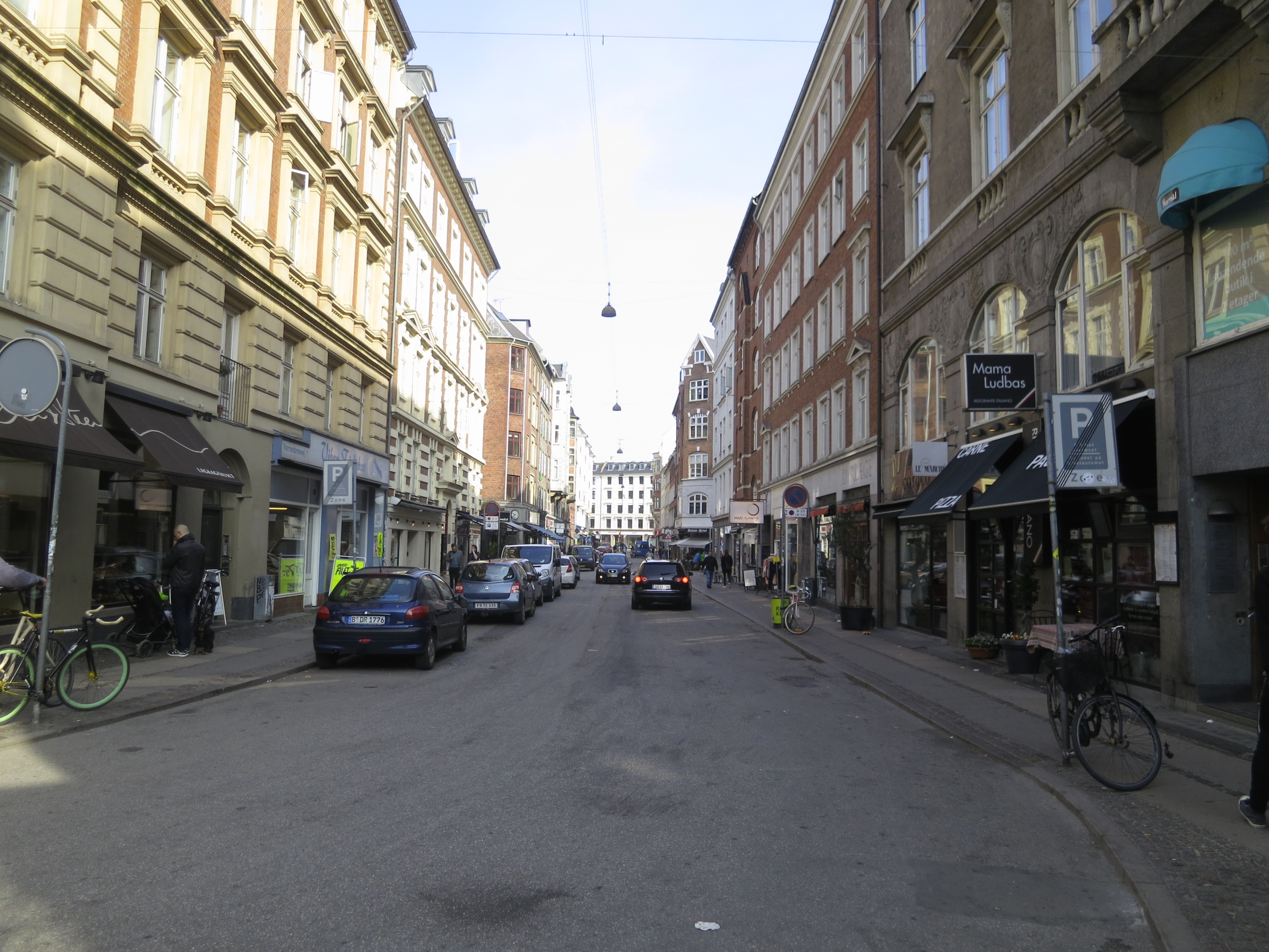
Værnedamsvej

Værnedamsvej is a lively shopping street, linking Vesterbrogade and the beginning of Frederiksberg Allé with Gammel Kongevej on the border between Frederiksberg and Vesterbro in central Copenhagen, Denmark. The street was formerly known for its many specialized food stores, but is now dominated by fashion boutiques and cafés. Tullinsgade is a side street to Værnedamsvej and makes a 90 degree turn before joining Gammel Kongevej.

== History ==
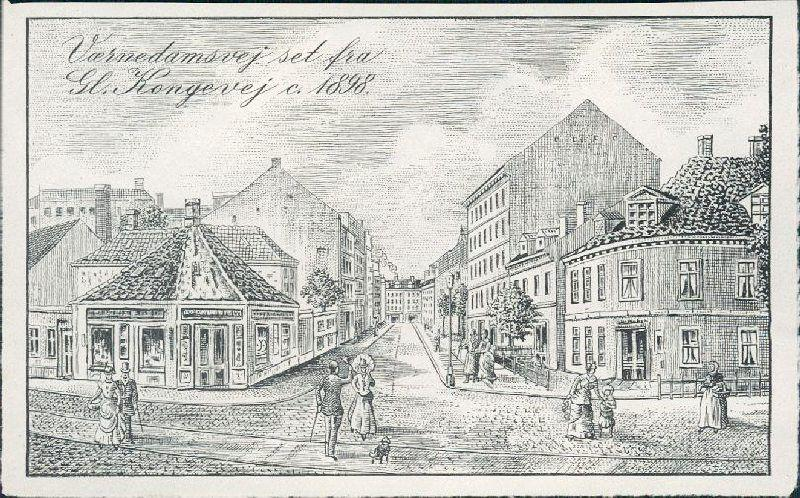
Værnedamsvej seen from Gammel Kongevej, 1898

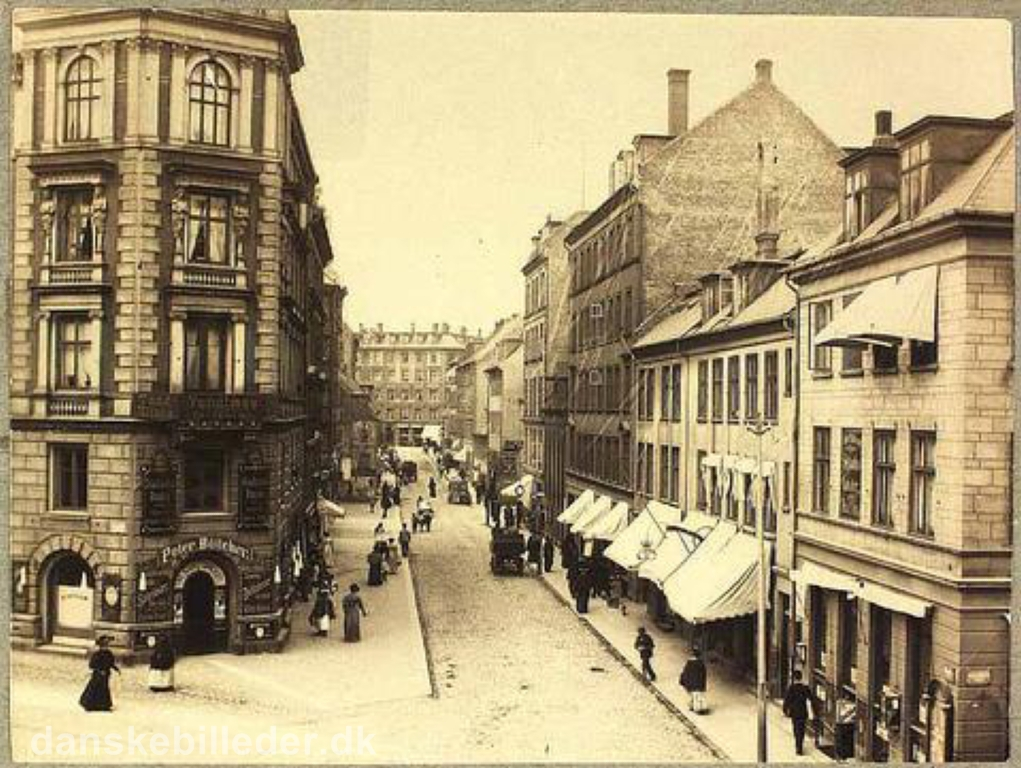
Værnedamsvej

Before 1733, Værnedamsvej existed as a nameless road section linking Vesterbrogade with Gammel Kongevej. Its name refers to the name of a beer tapper, Werner Dam, who acquired a piece of land and opened a popular beer garden at the site. After his death in 1762, his widow and her new husband ran the place until 1781. The street was also formerly known as Slagtergaden (Literally "The Butchers' Street"), due to its large volume of butchers.

Værnedamsvej later became known for its many specialized food and delicacy stores and its Parisian atmosphere. In 2013, the City proposed to pedestrianize the street but the idea was abandoned due to local opposition.

== Notable buildings and residents ==
The French-language school Lycée Français Prins Henrik has one of its two entrances at No. 13A. Its main entrance is located on Sankt Thomas Plads (Frederiksberg Allé No. 22A) on the other side of the block. It occupies the former premises of Schneekloths Skole.

Tullinsgade is home to Copenhagen's smallest hotel, the one-room Central Hotel & Café. The cafés, restaurants, and bars of Værnedamsvej include Café Granola (No. 5), Café Viggo (No. 15), Falernum (No. 16), Les Trois Cochons (No. 10), and Rist Kaffebar (No. 4B).

Among the fashion brands that have opened flagship stores in the Værnedamsvej-Tullinsgade neighbourhood are Mads Nørgaard, WoodWood, Soulland and Aesop.

The Playtype concept store has specialized in products, exhibitions, and events featuring typography since its opening in 2010. Dora (now No. 6), the interior and design boutique, has been a fixture of Værnedamsvej in two locations since its opening, and is regularly nominated for the prize of Byen Bedst Designbutik.

== Public art ==
The gable of Værnedamsvej 3 features a mural based on a classical of Storm P drawing. It was painted by Bill Savarese in 1995. Another one is located in nearby Ingemannsvej where he grew up.
