= AarBus =

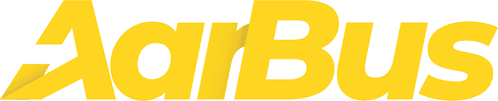
- Type: Public
- Industry: Public transport
- Founded: 1883 (as Aarhuus Sporvejsselskab)
- Headquarters: Aarhus, Denmark
- Area served: Aarhus Municipality, Jutland
- Products: Bus services
- Services: Public transportation
- Number of employees: ~650
- Parent: Midttrafik
- Website: aarbus.dk

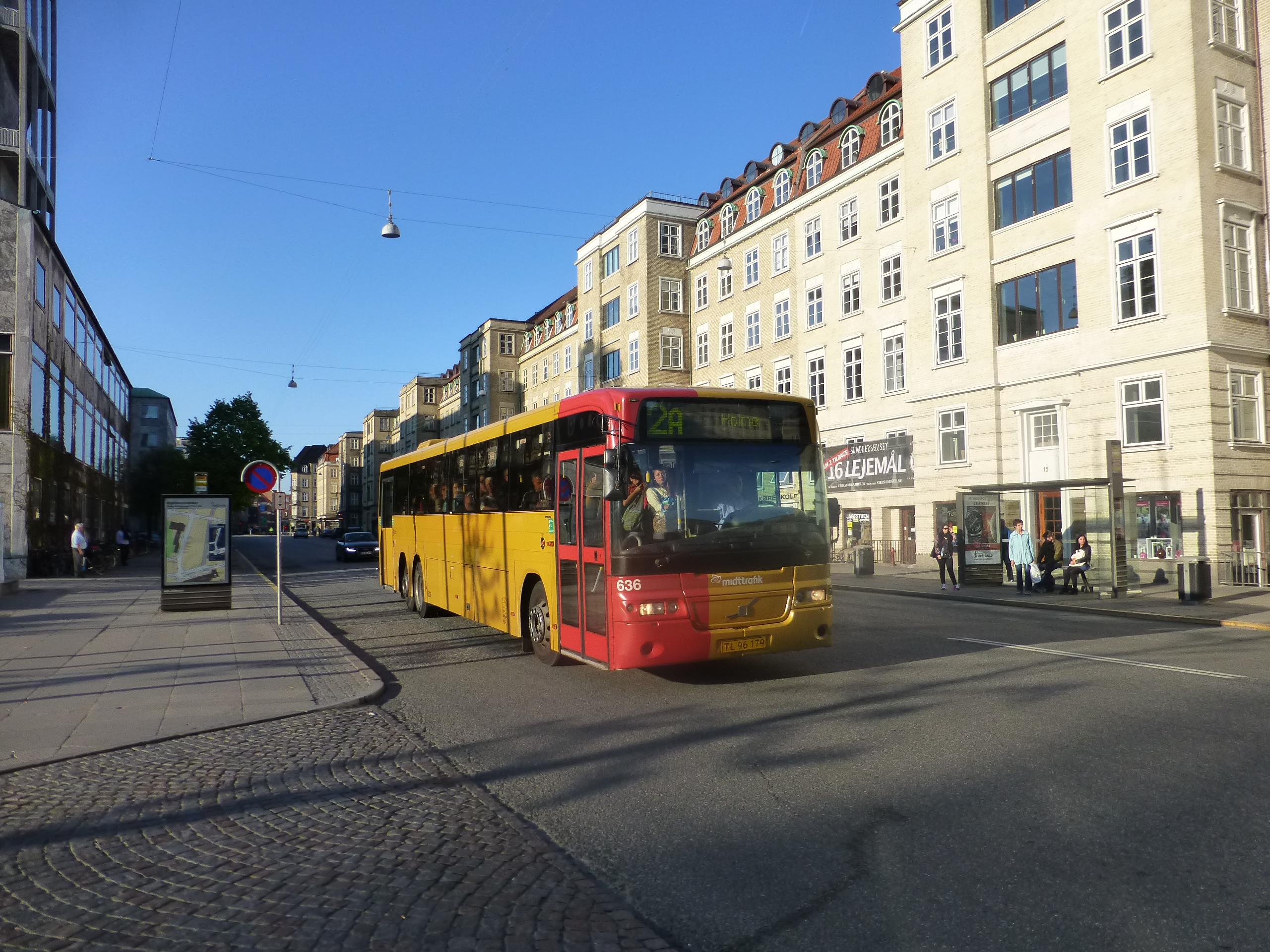
Aarhus Sporveje, Line 2A, 2013. Park Allé.

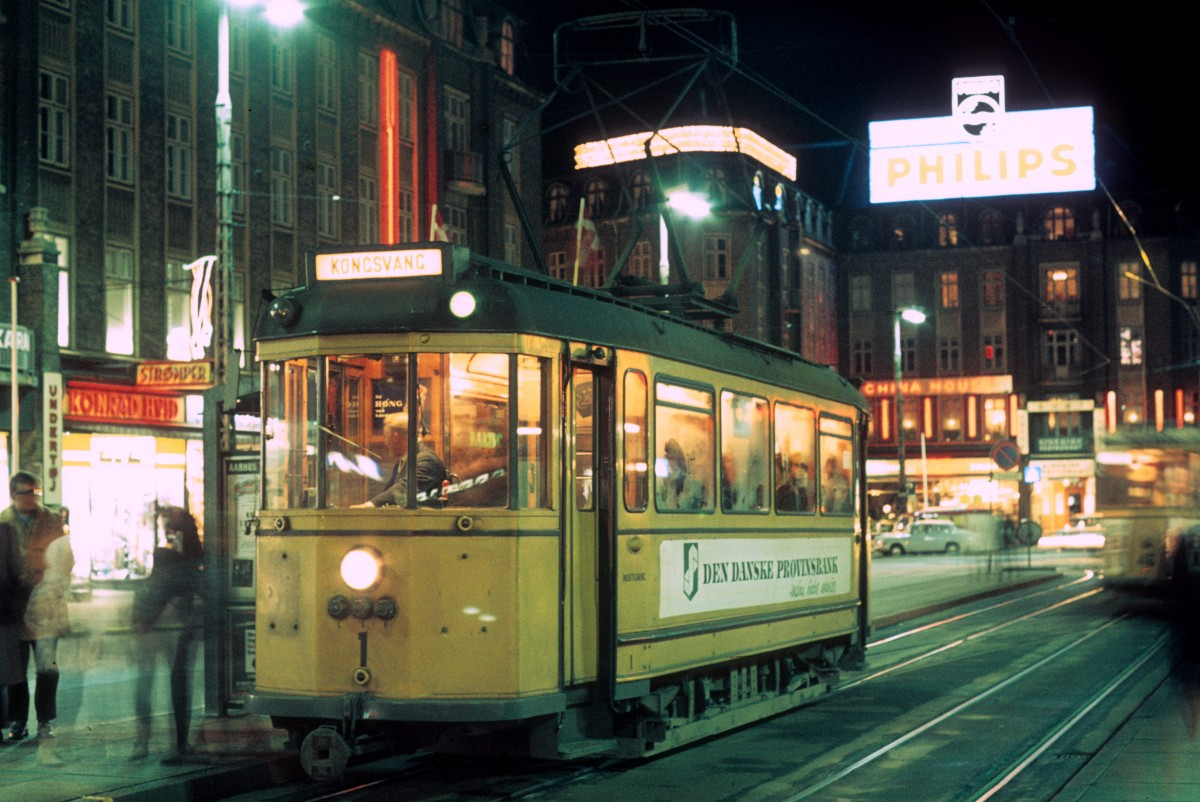
Aarhus Sporveje, Kongsvang Line, 1970s. Aarhus Central Station.

AarBus (until 2021 Busselskabet Aarhus Sporveje, colloquially known as Aarhus Sporveje) is a bus company operating in Jutland, Denmark. It is the primary bus operator in the city and municipality of Aarhus and the former municipal bus operator of Aarhus Municipality. The company maintains all bus operations in Aarhus Municipality through 3 contracts with the Central Denmark Region public transit organization Midttrafik. Two contracts were won in bids in 2008 and 2012 and the third, a holdover from when the company was a municipal entity, will be tendered in 2017.

Aarhus Sporveje employs about 650 people and daily services 24 routes with 1.268 stops.

== History ==
In 1883 Aarhuus Sporvejsselskab was founded, and it maintained a horse-drawn tram route from the central station to the cathedral until 1895 when it stopped operations. The year after in 1896 a horse-drawn omnibus route opened which operated until 1903 when electrification made electric trams practical. The company Aarhus Elektriske Sporvej was founded the same year and began running the first trams in 1904 under a 25-year concession. In 1928 Aarhus Municipality took over the company in order to expand services and the new municipal company was named Aarhus Sporveje.

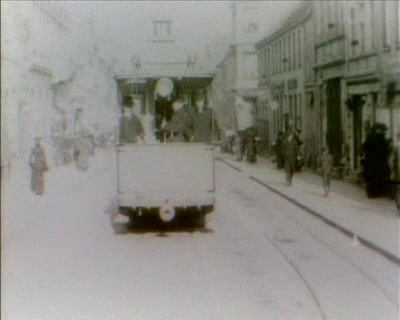
Aarhus Electric Tramway

In 1944, the Aarhus Sporveje tram depot was bombed in an act of schalburgtage during the occupation of Denmark and most of the trams were destroyed. The routes were subsequently serviced by buses, and the tram fleet were never fully restored. In 1971 the tram system was abolished and Aarhus has been serviced only by buses ever since. In 2007 Aarhus Sporveje was merged into the regional operator Midttrafik as part of the municipal reform of 2007 and was renamed Busselskabet Aarhus Sporveje.

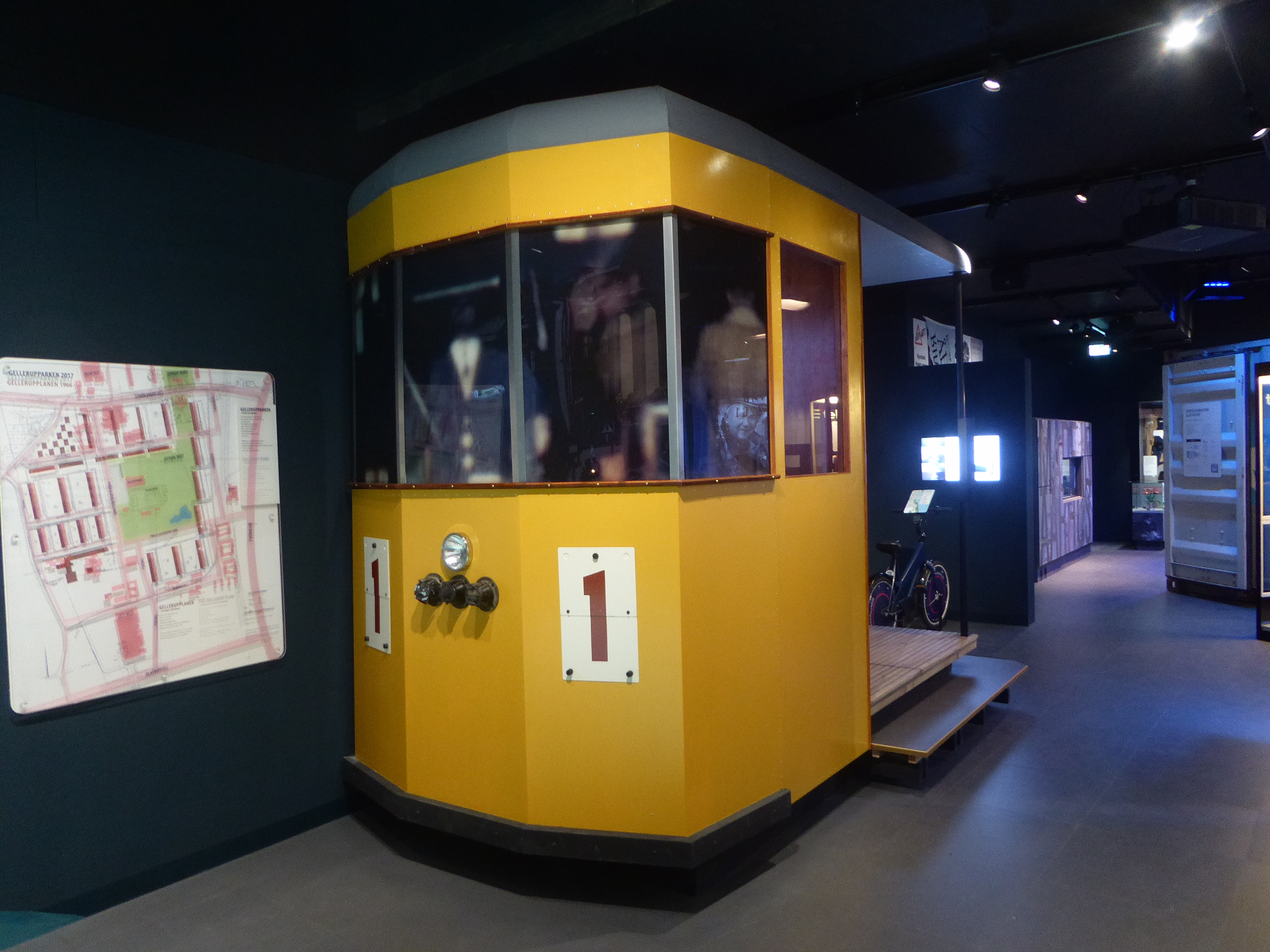

In 2021, the company changed the name from Busselskabet Aarhus Sporveje to AarBus, citing possible confusion between them and Aarhus Letbane.

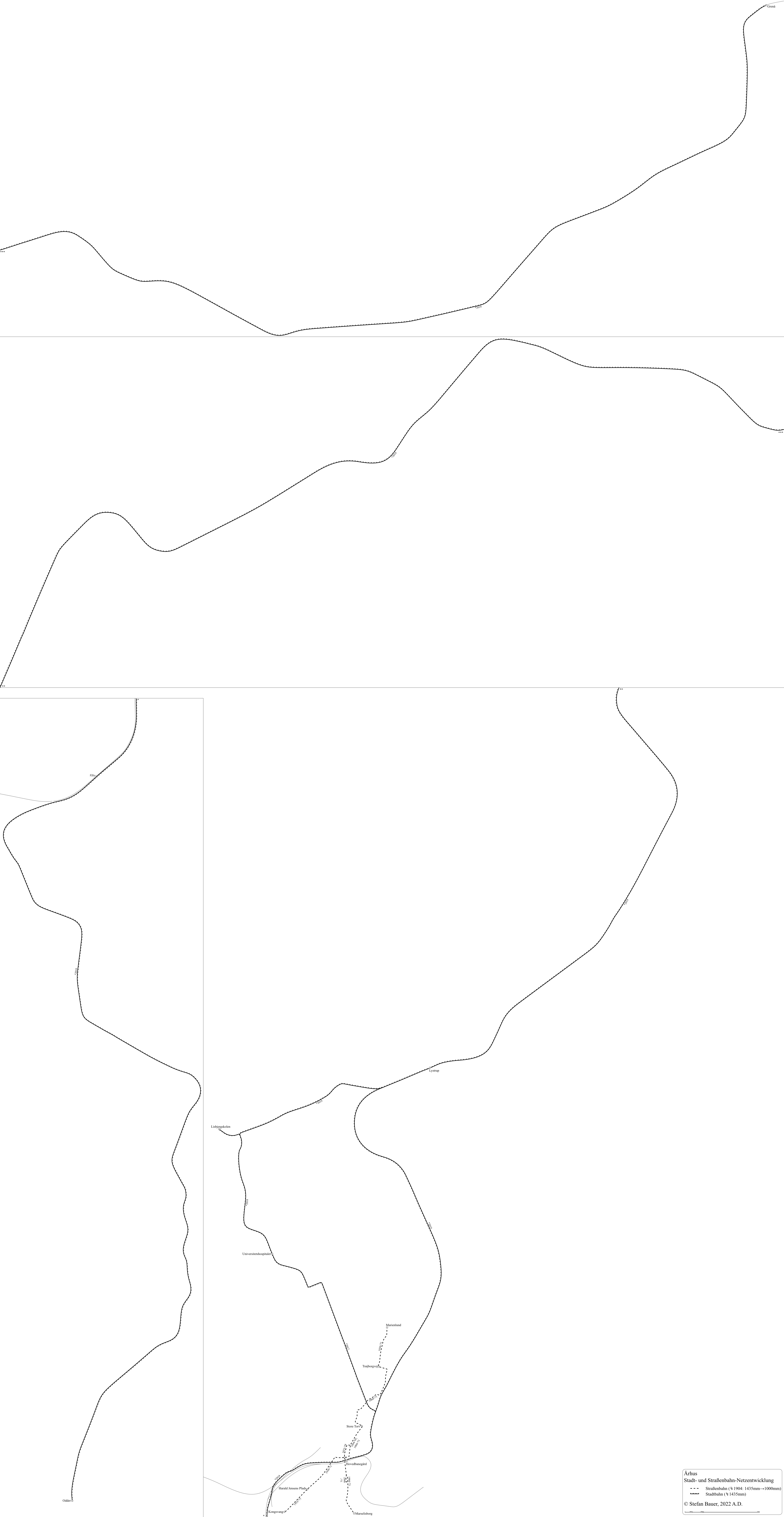
