= A.H. Riise Spirits =

Danish spirits company

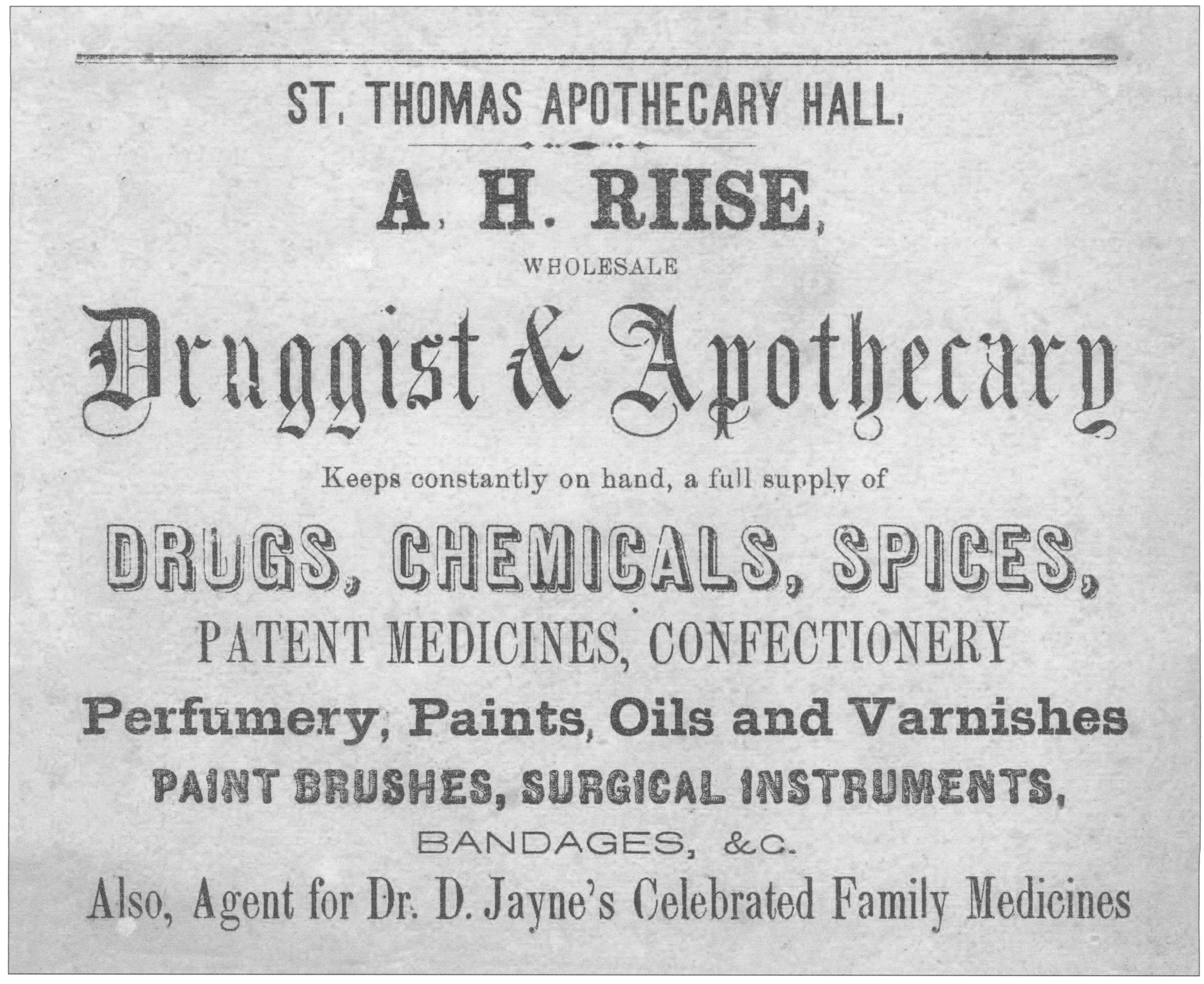
AH Riise Certificate, St. Thomas Apothecary Hall

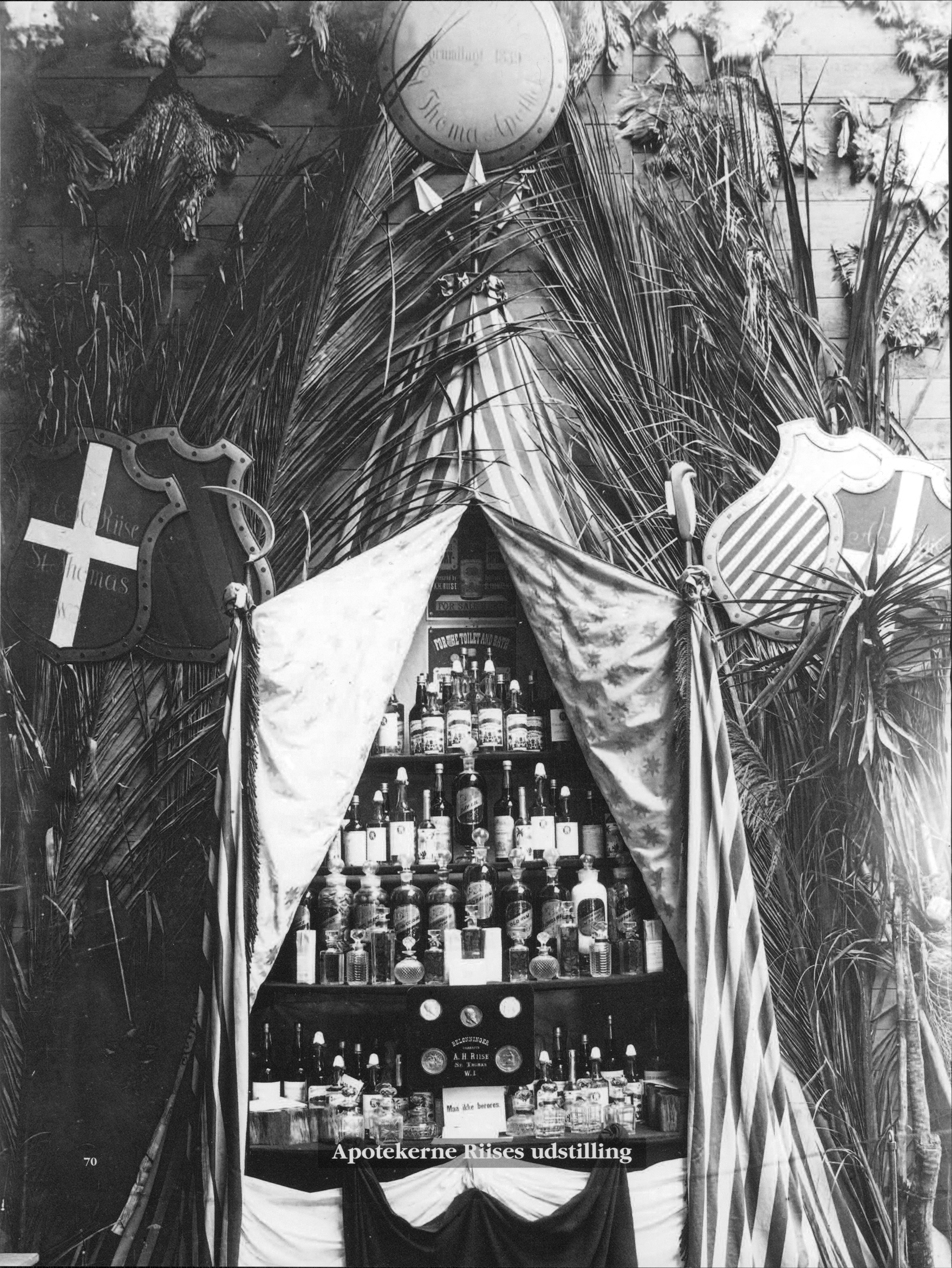
Copenhagen World Exhibition 1888, AH Riise (Company won Gold Medal)

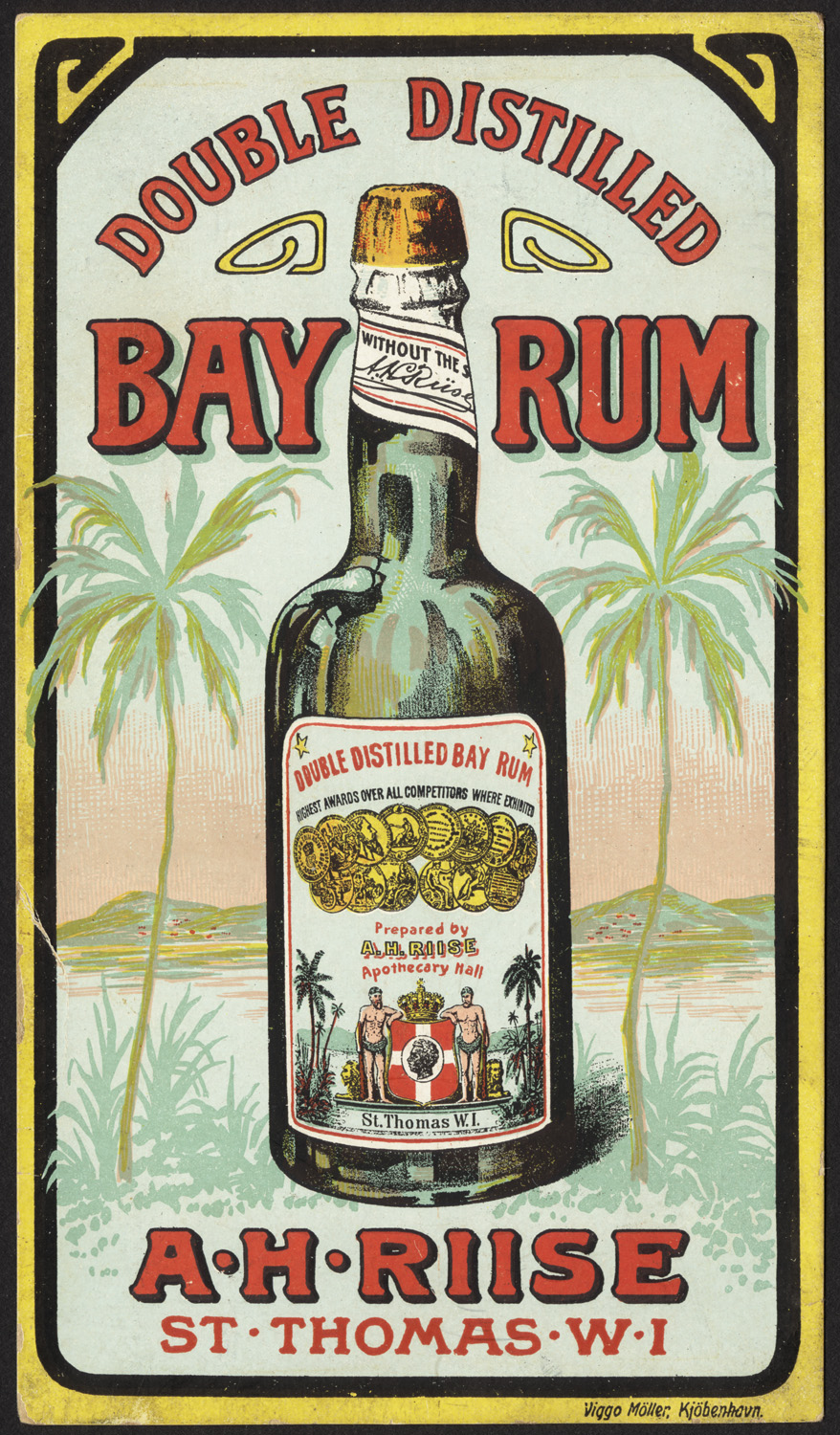
Advertisement for AH Riise double distilled bay rum

A.H. Riise Spirits is a spirits company based in Dragør, Denmark established in 1838.

== History ==
The company takes its name after Albert Heinrich Riise who established a production of rum on Saint Thomas in the Danish West Indies where he was appointed to pharmacist in 1839. The current company was established as United Spirits Brands when A.H. Riise Rum, Tranquebar Gin, were merged into one company in 2016. The company adopted the name A.H. Riise Spirits after its most well-known brand in 2018.

== Brands ==
AH Riise Spirits includes:

- A.H. Riise (Spirit drinks)
- Santos Dymont (Spirit drinks)
- Pharmacy 1838 (Bitters and licorice shots)
- Tranquebar (Gin)
