= Sankt Thomas Plads =

Plaza in Copenhagen, Denmark

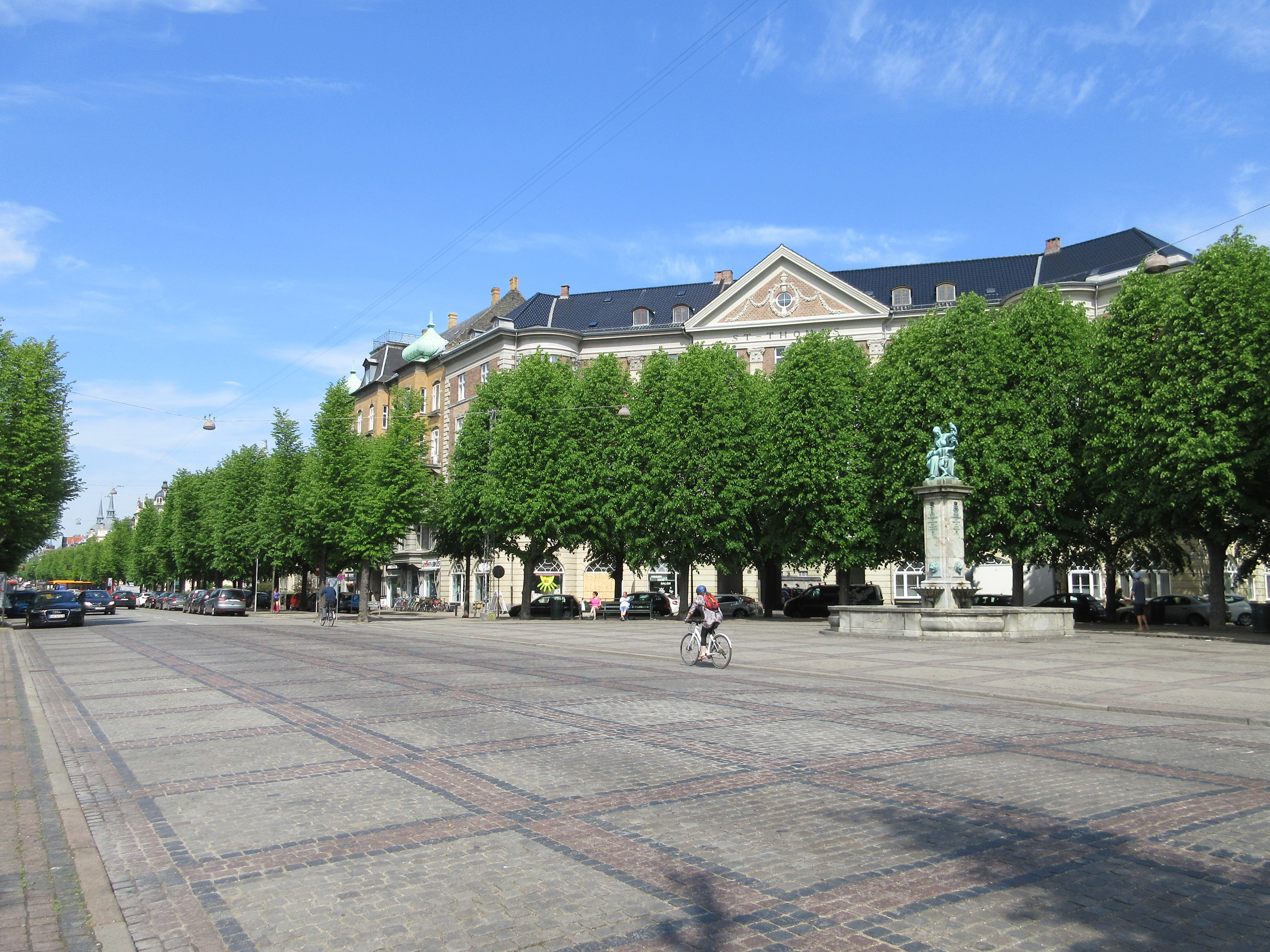
- Interactive map of Sankt Thomas Plads
- Length: 1,140 m (3,740 ft)
- Location: Copenhagen, Denmark
- Quarter: Frederiksberg
- Postal code: 1820
- Nearest metro station: Frederiksberg Allé
- Coordinates: 55°40′23.88″N 12°32′48.84″E

Sankt Thomas Plads is a round plaza located on Frederiksberg Allé, near its eastern end (where it meets Vesterbrogade) in the Frederiksberg district of Copenhagen, Denmark.

== History ==
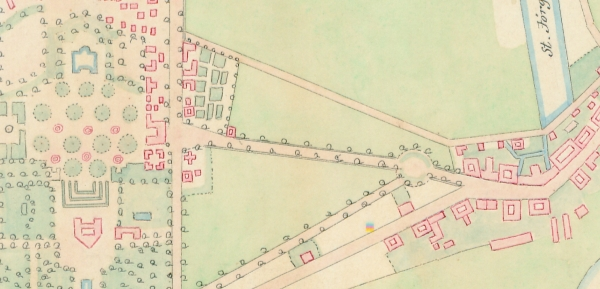
The plaza seen in the bottom right corner on a map detail from 1772

Sankt Thomas Plads traces its history back to the years between 1700 and 1704 when Frederiksberg Allé was established as the king’s private drive leading to the gardens at Frederiksberg Palace, the new royal summer retreat outside Copenhagen. For many years the small plaza had no official name, but became known colloquially as the Small Circle (Danish: Den Lille Runddel), as opposed to Frederiksberg Runddel, the Grand Circle, at the other end of the avenue.

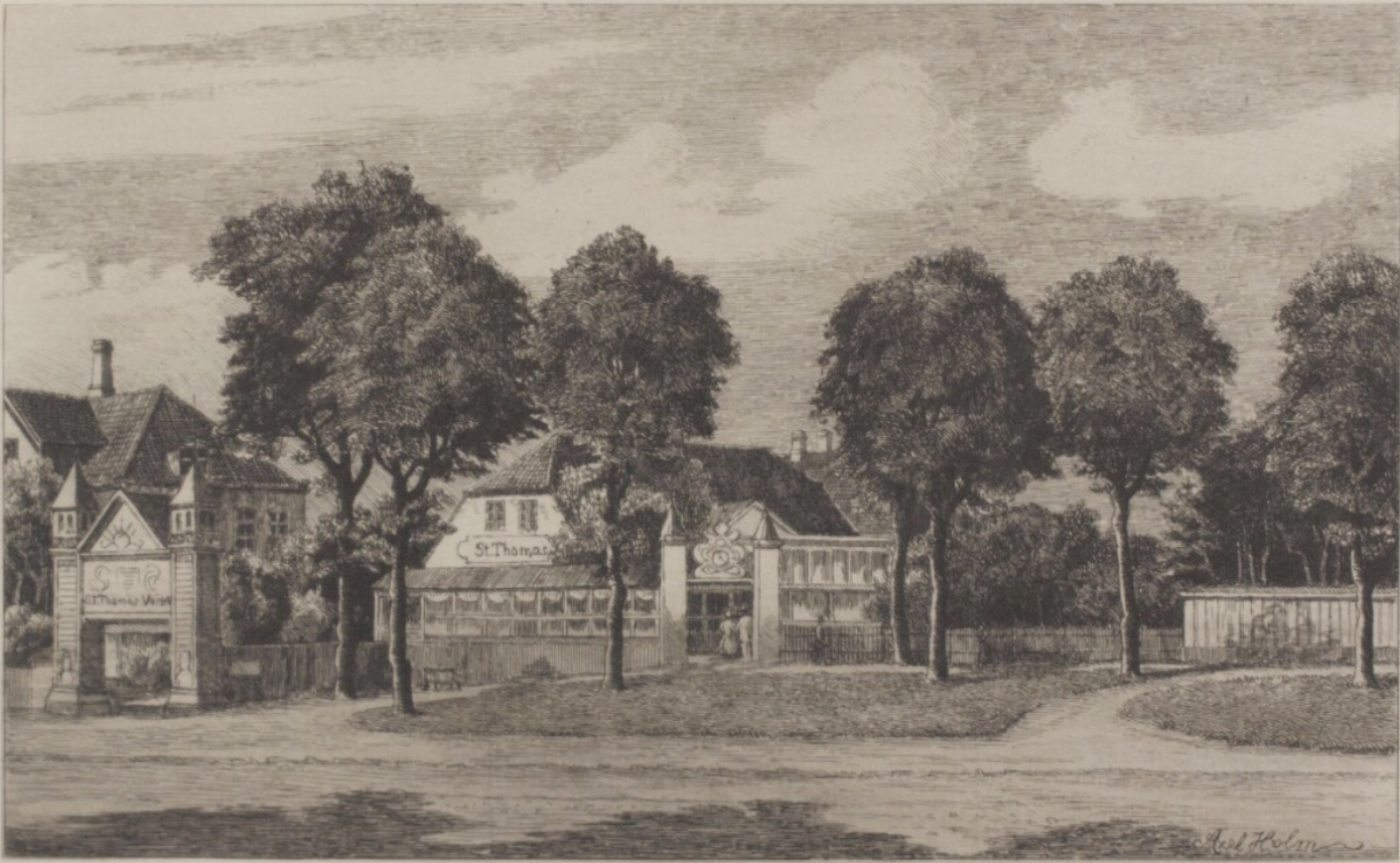
Etablissement Sankt Thomas.png

Albert Heinrich Riise, the first pharmacist on Saint Thomas in the Danish West Indies, bought a country house at the site in around 1868, renaming it Sankt Thomas after the island where he had lived for the past thirty years. When the villa was sold after Riise's death in 1882, it was transformed into an entertainment venue by the same name. This gave rise to the name Sankt Thomas Plads. The country house was demolished in 1903 but its name was transferred to the residential building built in its place in 1905. The name was officially adopted on 2 June 2003.

Sankt Thomas has had its round shape since its establishment in the beginning of the 18th century. Its current design dates mostly from a refurbishment which took place in 1932 in connection with the 75-year anniversary of Frederiksberg Municipality.

== Memorial fountains ==
Two memorial fountains were installed on the plaza in connection with the refurbishment in 1922. They were designed by the architect A.S.K. Lauritzen and bear various inscriptions which commemorate the history of Frederiksbeerg and are each topped by a bronze figure designed by the Hungarian-born sculptor Jenö Meister. One of them depicts a Dutch woman, representing the Dutch farmers who were relocated to the area from Amager by King Frederick II in the middle of the 17th century. The other depicts a falconer to commemorate Falkonergården, the royal falconry farm which was in use until 1810 and is also heralded in the three falcons seen in Frederiksberg's coat of arms.

== Transport ==
The nearest metro station is Frederiksberg Allé, on the corner with Platanvej.

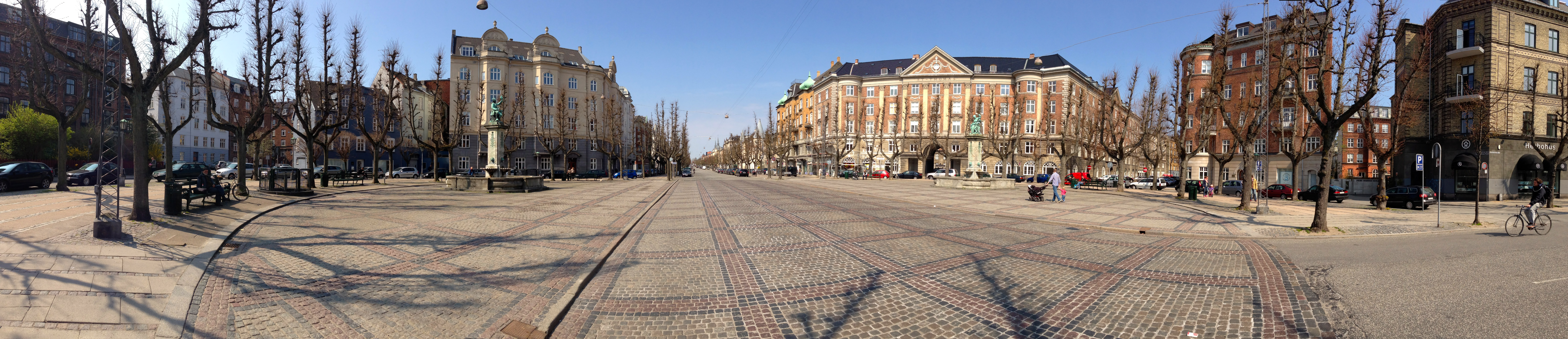
Sankt Thomas Plads

== See also ==
- Sankt Jakobs Plads
