= Kjøbenhavns Forstæders Sporveisselskab =

Kjøbenhavns Forstæders Sporveisselskab (literally "Copenhagen Suburban Tramway Company") was an operator of three tramways in Copenhagen, Denmark. The company was founded in 1872 and merged into De kjøbenhavnske Sporveje in 1898.

== History ==
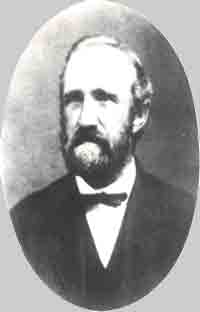
O.V. Bruun

Kjøbenhavns Forstæders Sporveiiselskab was founded by O.V. Bruun after he had been granted a concession on the establishment and operation of a tram line between Tringlen and Gammel Kongevej on 5 August 1872. He subsequently founded the Blegdamsvej Line which opened on 12 April 1873 and was initially served by nine tram cars that operated with nine minute intervals.

The company obtained the concession on the Farimagsgade Line. It was inaugurated on 22 July 1883 and was initially served by eight one-storey tram cars that were operated with eight minute intervals.

The company's Nørregade Line, its third and last tram line, was inaugurated on 20 July 1884. It was served by five one-storey tram cars with seven minute intervals.

O.V. Bruun died on 23 July 1884 and was succeeded by E. Lautrup. He had previously served as inspector at Frederiksberg Hospital. More tram cars were added on all three lines in the 1890s.

Kjøbenhavns Forstæders Sporveisselskab merged with four other tram companies under the name A/S De kjøbenhavnske Sporveje on 1 August 1898. E. Lautrup was CEO of the new company, a position he held until his death in 1902.

== Depots ==
- Blegdamsvej
- Øster Farimagsgade

== Lines ==
Name	Established	Route	Ref
Main Line			
Blegdamsvej Line; Blegdamslinjen	12 April 1872	Trianglen, Blegdamsvej, Læssøesgade, Ryesgade. Sankt Hansgade, Dosseringen, Baggesensgade, Blågårdsgade, Agade, H. C. Ørstedvej, Niels Ebbesensvej, Vodroffsvej, Gammel Kongevej, Trommesalen	Ref
Farimagsgade Line; Farimagsgadelinjen	22 July 1883	Trianglen, Østerbrogade, Lille Triangel. Øster Farimagsgade, Vester Farimagsgade. Axeltorv, Halmtorvet (now Rådhuspladsen)	Ref
Nørregade Line; Nørregadelinjen	20 July 1884	Sølvtorvet, Nørregade, Dyrkøb/Gammeltorv	Ref
