= Peter Andersen (industrialist) =

Danish industrialist

Peter AAndersen
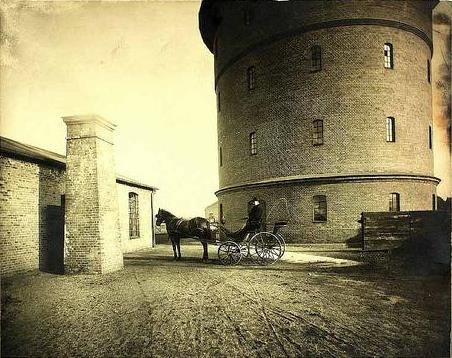
- Born: 24 December 1814; Denmark
- Died: 18 September 1887 (aged 72); Frederiksberg, Denmark
- Occupation: Industrialist

Peter Andersen (24 December 1814 – 18 September 1887) was a Danish industrialist. He was the owner of an iron foundry and machine factory in Frederiksberg and also established Frederiksberg Municipality's first waterworks. P. Andersen's Water Tower is listed on the Danish registry of protected buildings and places.

== Career ==
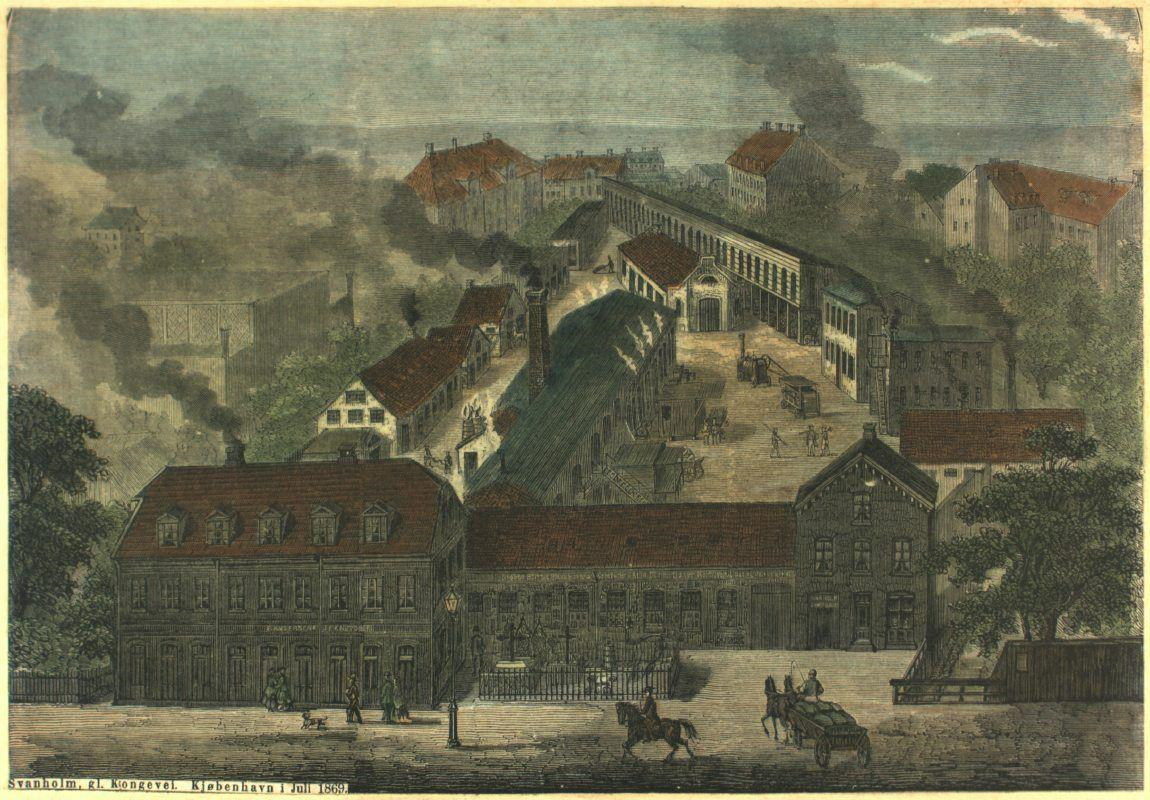
Svanholm Iron Foundry in 1869

In 1853, Andersen established an iron foundry on the Svanholm estate at Gammel Kongevej 62-64, between Vodroffsvej and Danmarksgade, in Frederiksberg. Svanholm Brewery was located on an adjacent site (No. 68(. In 1859, he was granted a five year monopoly on the casting of "hollow cylindrical objects" ("hule cylindriske legemer ved hjælp af vertikale jernformkasser og kernestiver").

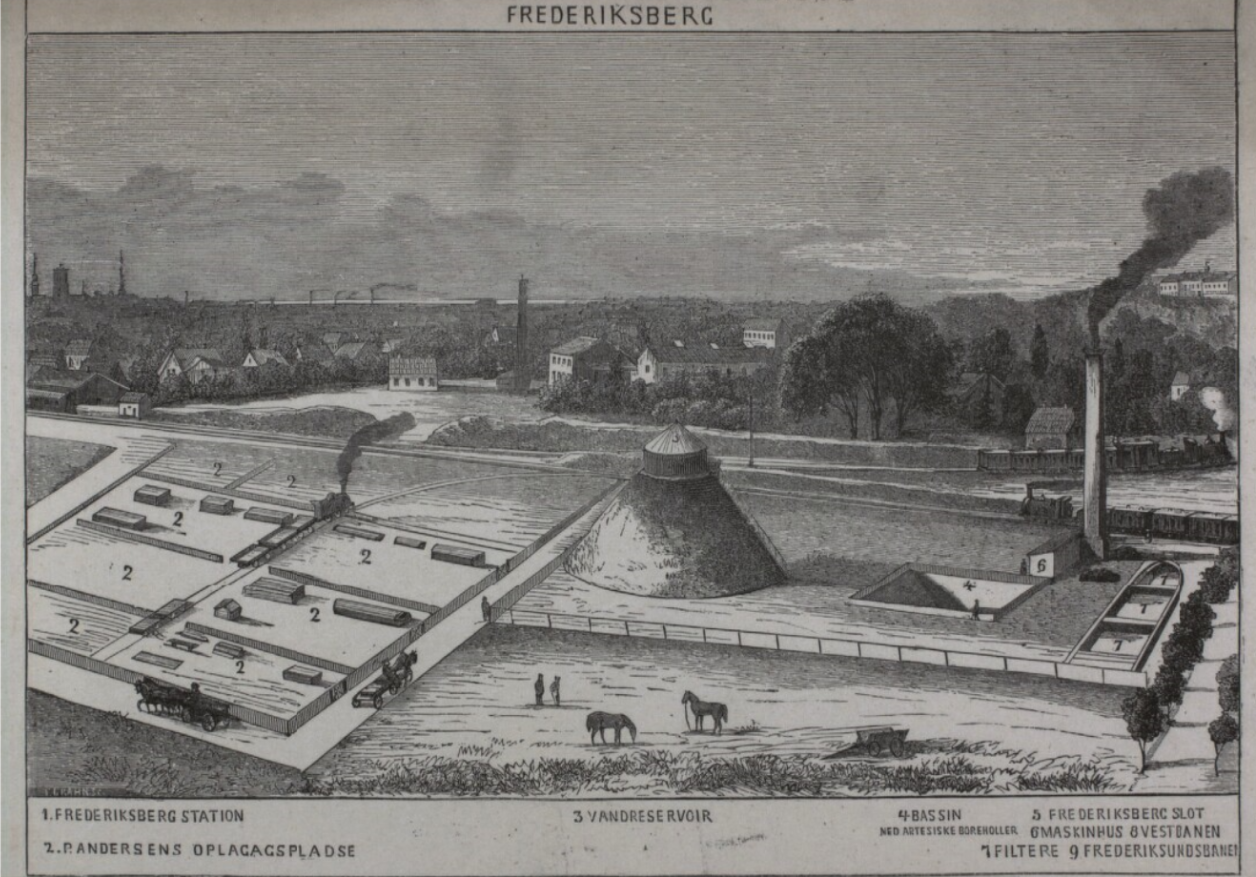
P. Andersen's waterworks and depot, 1878

Frederiksberg was incorporated as an independent municipality in 1857. In the early 1860s, a small working class neighbourhood known as the Schønberggade Quarter developed around his factory. The industrial activities and increasing density of the area resulted in a severe shortage of water. In 1868, after the magistrate in Copenhagen had rejected to supply the area with water, Andersen was given permission to establish his own waterworks on his property. It was completed in 1870 and he had by then als installed the necessary water pipes in the Schønbergs Quarter. On 16 Juni 1870, the Municipakl Council visited the complex. He later signed a contract with Frederiksberg Municipality for the installation of water pipes in Gammel Kongevej, Allégade, Nyvej and Frederiksberg Allé as well as for the supply of water for watering the roads and for fire emergencies. His waterworks had a limited capacity of 4,000 barrels of water a day. In 1877, Frederiksberg Municipality therefore had to establish its first public waterworks. Andersen that same year constructed a new watertower at Lygtevej.

== Personal life and legacy ==
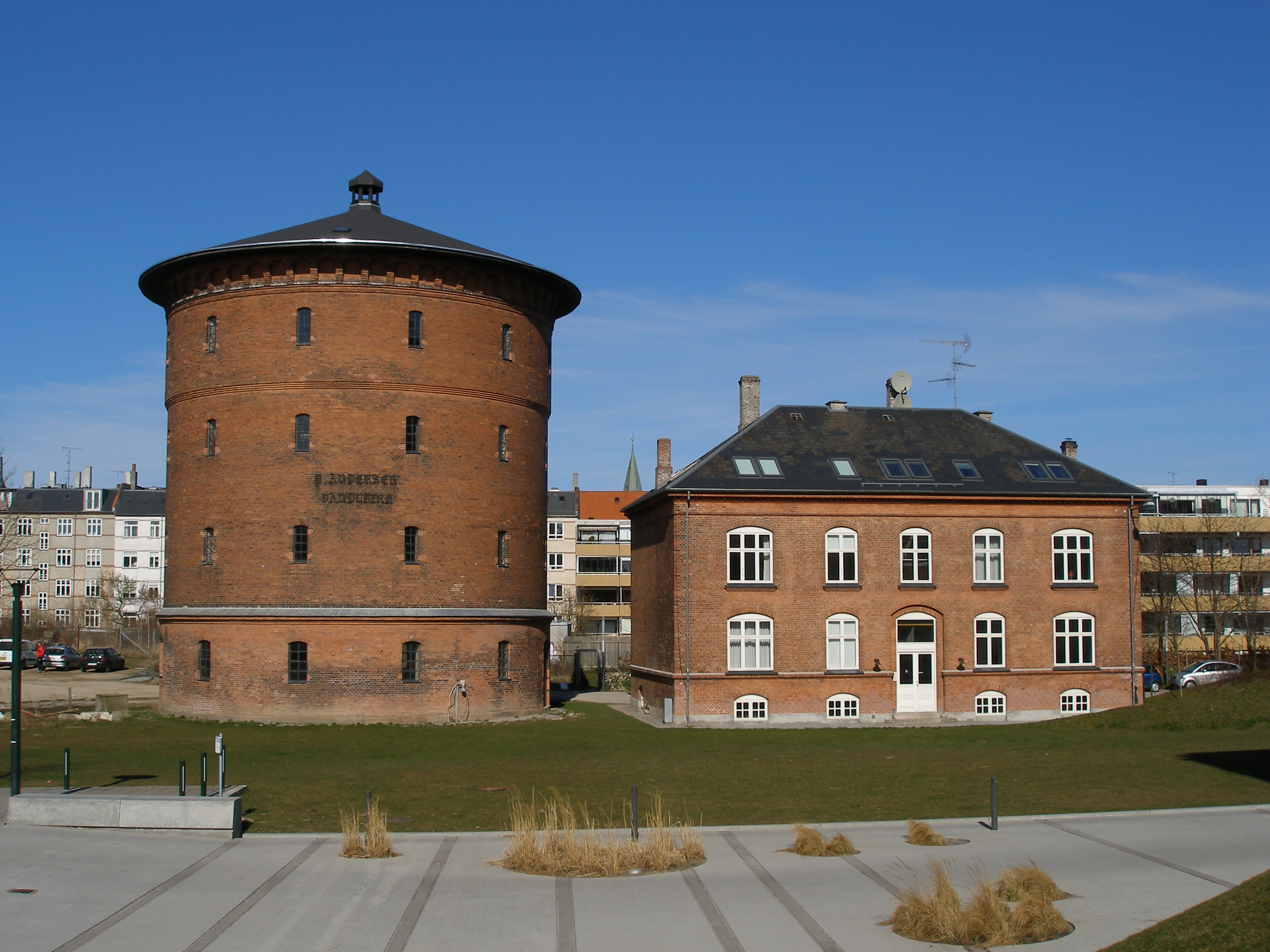
P. Andersen's Watertower

Andersen was married to Oline Louise Andersen (13 Februar 1810 – 19 March 1874). They had two children, Carl Theodor Andersen and Vilhelmine Andersen. Peter Andersen died on 18 September 1887 and is buried at Frederiksberg Old Cemetery.

Carl Theodor Andersen continued the company. The street Prinsesse Maries Allé was established on the western part of the property in 1905. In 919, Svanholm was the following year acquired by the wholesale company Bang & Pingel. The buildings were demolished in the 1950s to make way for the Codan Building.

P, Andersen's Water Tower was listed on the Danish registry of protected buildings and places in 1991. It was designed by Vilhelm Tvede.
