= Prinsesse Maries Allé =

Street in Copenhagen, Denmark

Prinsesse Maries Allé is a street in the Frederiksberg district of Copenhagen, Denmark, linking Gammel Kongevej in the south to Vodroffsvej in the north.

== History ==
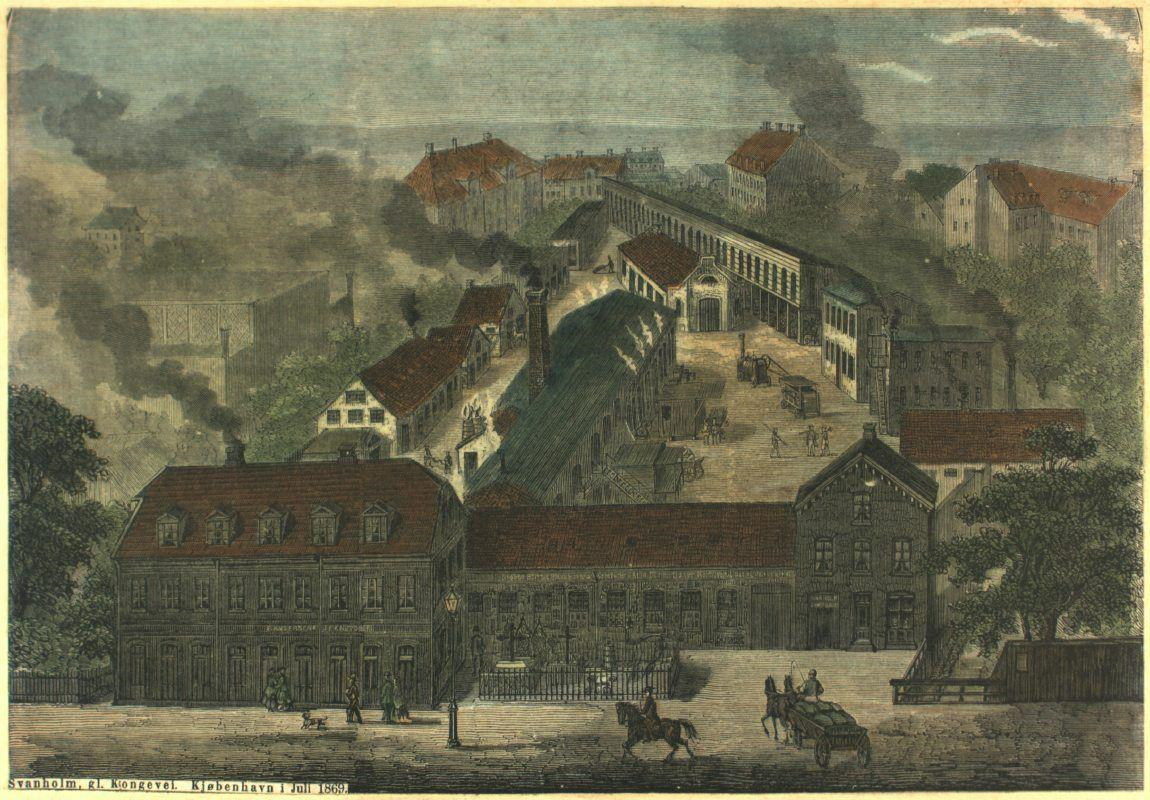
Svanholm Iron Foundry in 1869

A country house named Svanholm was from the 18th century located at the site. In 1853, Peter Andersen established an iron foundry on the property. Svanholm Brewery was at the same time established by Isaac Wulff Heyman to the rear of Andersen's iron foundry.

Peter Andersen's iron foundry was later expanded with a machine factory. In 1869, he also established Frederiksberg's first waterworks on his property. In 1891, Svanholm Brewery merged with several other breweries under the name De Forenede Bryggerier (United Breweries).

Prinsesse Maries Allé was established on the western part of the property in 1905. It was named after Princess Marie who had herself approved the name. The west side of the new street was lined with apartment buildings. The brewery building had been demolished to make way for apartment buildings at the northern and of the street but the industrial complex on the eastern corner with Gammel Kongevej was preserved. The buildings were acquired by the plumbing company Bang & Pingel in 1918 who occupied them until September 1958. They were demolished when the insurance company Codan constructed a new headquarters at the site.
