= Institut Jeanne d'Arc =

Roman Catholic school in Copenhagen, Denmark

Coordinates: 55.6747°N 12.5368°E

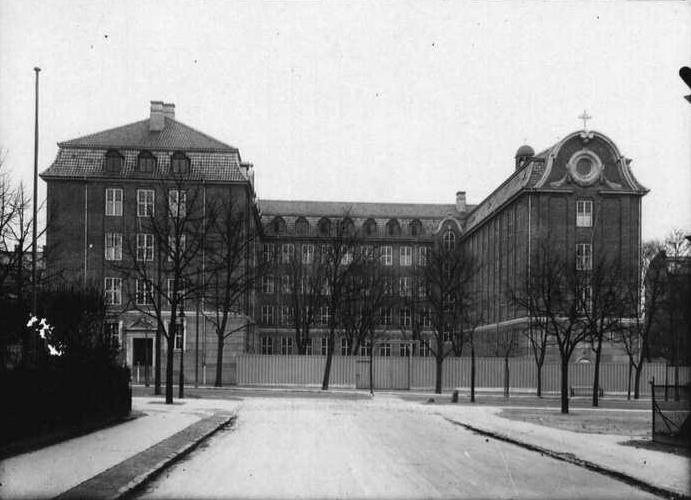
Institut Jeanne d'Arc, photographed in 1924

The Institut Jeanne d'Arc, also Den Franske Skole, was a French-language Roman Catholic school at 74 Frederiksberg Allé in the Frederiksberg district of central Copenhagen, Denmark. Established in 1924, it was bombed by the Royal Air Force on 21 March 1945, during Operation Carthage, when pilots mistook the school for their actual target, which was roughly 1.6 km (1 mi) to the east-northeast. The bombing killed 86 children and 19 adults.

== History ==
Designed by the Danish architect Christian Mandrup-Poulsen (1865–1952), the school was established on 1 August 1924 by the Danish Sisters of St. Joseph who arrived in Denmark in 1856. They had already established another school, the Institut Sankt Joseph in the Østerbro district of Copenhagen in 1858. The three-winged red-brick building, consisting of four stories and a mansard, housed 29 classrooms.

== Mistaken bombing ==
On 21 March 1945, in response to a request by the Danish resistance that the Copenhagen Gestapo headquarters should be destroyed, 20 RAF Mosquitos left for Copenhagen on a mission designated Operation Carthage. The target was Shellhuset (The Shell House) on Kampmannsgade in the city centre, which housed the Gestapo.

One of the Mosquitos in the first of three waves hit a tall lamppost, causing it to crash into a garage close to the school, roughly 1.6 km (1 mi) to the west-southwest of the Shellhuset. Two of the Mosquitos in the second wave mistook the burning structure as having been successfully bombed by the first wave, and dropped their bombs on the French School, killing 86 children and 19 adults and wounding 67 children and 35 adults.

== Aftermath ==
The school was destroyed by the bombing and the remaining buildings were demolished. Today, six apartment buildings stand on the site. The remaining pupils were transferred to the Institut Sankt Joseph which was subsequently expanded. In 1953, a monument created by Max Andersen was erected on the site.

== In popular culture ==
The Danish movie The Shadow in My Eye (Skyggen i mit øje in Danish), telling the story of the raid and the school's destruction, was released in October 2021 in Denmark. Netflix released the movie on its streaming service in March 2022, as The Bombardment.
