= Equinox (2020 TV series) =

Danish television series

- Equinox poster
- Genre: Supernatural; Mystery; Thriller
- Created by: Tea Lindeburg
- Written by: Tea Lindeburg; Mette Kruse; Tue Walin Storm; Andreas Garfield; Jacob Katz Hansen; Bo Mikkelsen; Mie Skjoldemose
- Directed by: Søren Balle; Mads Matthiesen
- Starring: Danica Curcic; Lars Brygmann; Fanny Bornedal
- Composers: Kristian Leth; Fridolin Nordsø
- Country of origin: Denmark
- Original language: Danish
- No. of seasons: 1
- No. of episodes: 6

Production
- Executive producer: Piv Bernth
- Producer: Dorte Riis Lauridsen
- Cinematography: Laust Trier-Mørk; Mattias Troelstrup
- Running time: ca. 45 minutes
- Production company: Apple Tree Productions

Original release
- Network: Netflix
- Release: 30 December 2020

Equinox is a Danish supernatural thriller Netflix series created by Tea Lindeburg, based on the Danish podcast Equinox 1985. The series premiered on 30 December 2020 and stars Danica Curcic in the lead role of Astrid, a young woman who investigates the disappearance of her sister twenty years before.

== Synopsis ==
In 1999, nine-year-old Astrid is traumatized by the mysterious disappearance of her sister Ida together with her school class, who are celebrating their graduation in a typically Danish fashion. Astrid suffers from nightmares and horrific visions following the tragedy. Twenty-one years later, when one of the survivors from the class calls her up unexpectedly, Astrid decides to investigate what happened in 1999. As she begins her exploration of the long-ago events, she discovers a dark and unsettling truth that involves her in ways she never imagined.

== Cast and characters ==
- Danica Curcic as Astrid
- Lars Brygmann as Dennis
- Karoline Hamm as Ida
- Hanne Hedelund as Lene
- Viola Martinsen as Astrid, 9 years old
- Fanny Bornedal as Amelia
- August Carter as Jakob
- Ask Truelsen as Falke
- Alexandre Willaume as Henrik
- Peder Holm Johansen as Torben
- Rasmus Hammerich as Mathias
- Zaki Nobel Mehabil as David
- Tina Gylling Mortensen as Doris
- Susanne Storm as Isobel

== Episodes ==
No.	Title	Directed by	Written by	Original release date
1	"It's Going to Happen Again"	Søren Balle	Tea Lindeburg	30 December 2020
2	"The Girl Is Gone"	Søren Balle	Tea Lindeburg & Bo Mikkelsen	30 December 2020
3	"What Is It You See When You're Asleep?"	Søren Balle	Tea Lindeburg & Mie Skjoldemose	30 December 2020
4	"Everything in Its Place"	Søren Balle	Tea Lindeburg & Andreas Garfield	30 December 2020
5	"I Hear Voices"	Mads Matthiesen	Tea Lindeburg & Jacob Katz Hansen	30 December 2020
6	"The Blood Runs in the Veins"	Mads Matthiesen	Tea Lindeburg & Andreas Garfield	30 December 2020

== See also ==
- Cernunnos
- Ostara
