= Alhambravej =

Street in Copenhagen, Denmark

Alhambravej is a street in the Frederiksberg district of Copenhagen, Denmark. It runs from Frederiksberg Allé in the south to Gammel Kongevej in the north, linking Kingogade with H. C. Ørstedsvej. The street takes its name after Alhambra, a now demolished 19th-century entertainment complex which was located on its east side.

== History ==
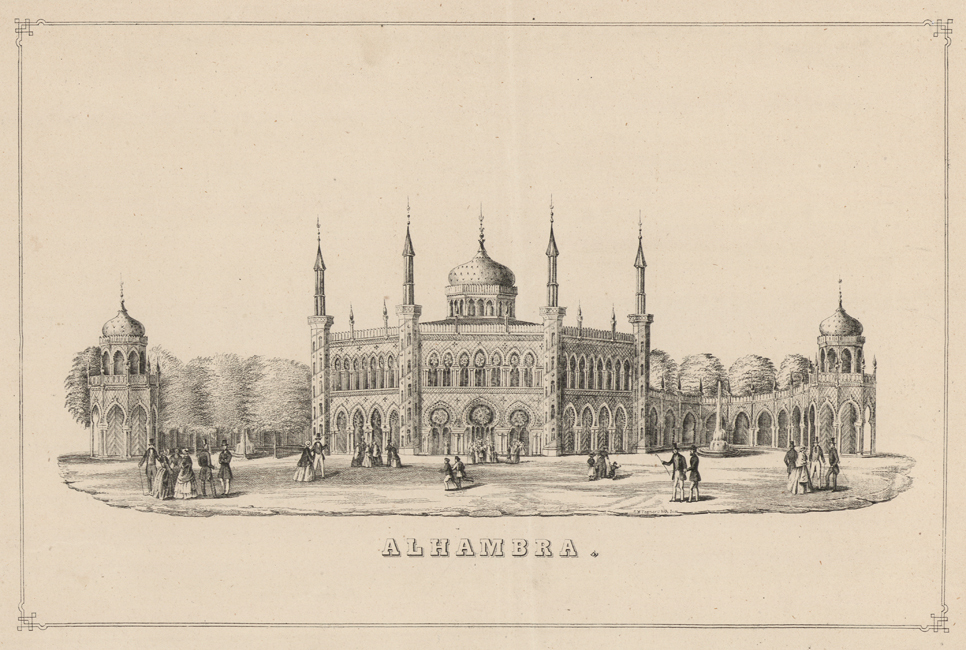
The Alhambra complex

Alhambra was opened by Georg Carstensen in 1857. The complex comprised the largest theatre in Copenhagen. The venture was never a commercial success, partly because of the distance from the city centre and the lack of street lighting in the evening. It therefore had to close in 1869.

The street was laid out when the entertainment venue closed and was officially named on 4 August 1870. It was with large villas for the upper middle class. Tram line-3 operated through the street.

== Notable buildings ==
The building at the western corner with Frederiksberg Allé (Frederiksberg Allé 42-44 og Alhambravej 1–3) is called Alhambra. Built in 1906–08 to designs by Henrik Hagemann and E. Stegmann, it is one of few examples of the Jugendstil in Frederiksberg. The facade is decorated with flower ornamentation. A conditorie, Tivoli-Konditoriet, was originally based in the ground floor of the building. The premises has now been taken over by a restaurant but much of the original décor has been preserved. The neighbouring building (No. 1-3) was designed by Henrik Hagemann (1845–1910).
