= Operation Carthage =

1945 British air raid on Copenhagen, Nazi-occupied Denmark, during WWII

- Part of the Second World War
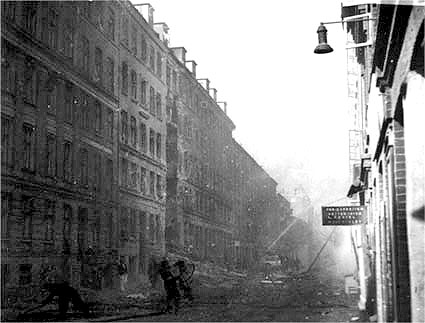
- The air raid on the Shellhus
Date	21 March 1945
Location	Copenhagen, Denmark 55.6778°N 12.5617°E
Result	British victory

Belligerents
- (Australia) RAAF (United Kingdom) Royal Air Force (New Zealand) RNZAF

Strength
20 bombers, 30 fighters	Various antiaircraft defences

Casualties and losses
6 aircraft destroyed 9 aircrew killed 1 aircrew captured	The Danish headquarters of the Gestapo destroyed 55 German soldiers and 47 Danish employees of the Gestapo killed
- 123 Danish civilians killed, including 87 schoolchildren 8 Danish prisoners of the Gestapo killed

Operation Carthage, on 21 March 1945, was a British air raid on Copenhagen, Denmark during the Second World War which caused significant collateral damage. The target of the raid was the Shellhus, used as Gestapo headquarters in the city centre. It was used for the storage of dossiers and the torture of Danish citizens during interrogations. The Danish Resistance had long asked the British to conduct a raid against the site. The building was destroyed, 18 prisoners were freed and Nazi anti-resistance activities were disrupted. Part of the raid was mistakenly directed against a nearby school; the raid caused 123 civilian deaths (including 87 schoolchildren and 18 adults at the school). The incident was dramatised in the 2021 Danish film The Shadow in My Eye. A similar raid against the Gestapo headquarters in Aarhus, on 31 October 1944, had succeeded.

== Background ==
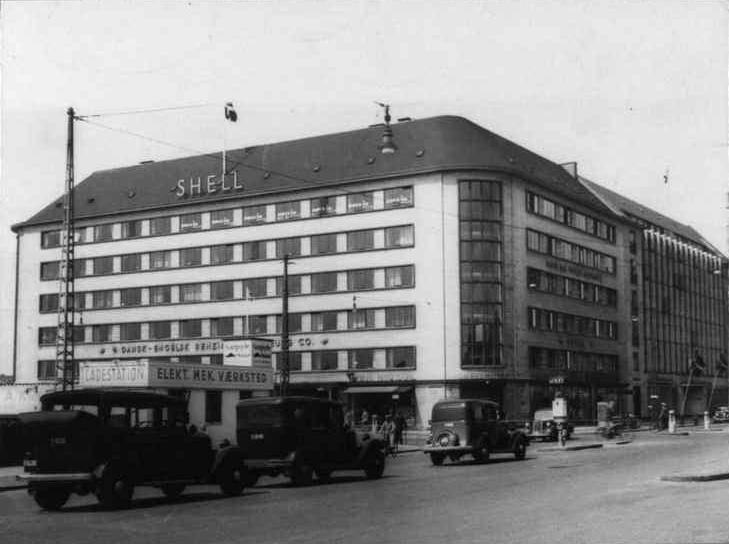
Shell House before the bombing. At the time of the bombing it was painted in camouflage colours.

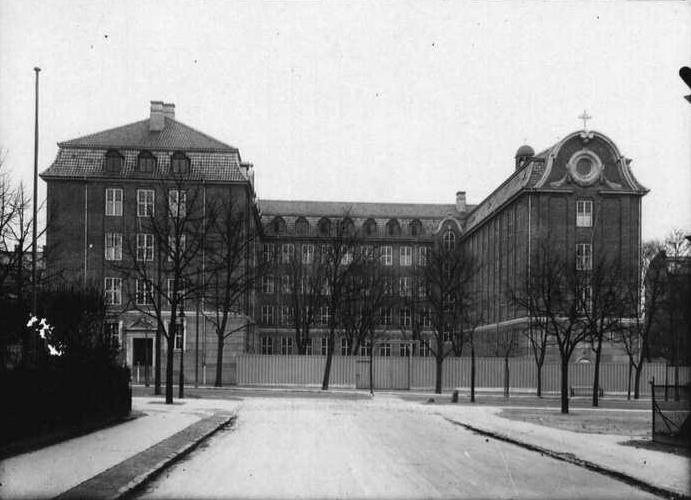
Institut Jeanne d'Arc, a Roman Catholic girl school in Frederiksberg Allé, Frederiksberg, Copenhagen. Established in 1924, bombed by accident by the RAF 21 March 1945 and demolished.

The raid was requested by members of the Danish resistance movement to free imprisoned members and to destroy the records of the Gestapo, to disrupt their operations. The RAF initially turned down the request as too risky, due to the location in a crowded city centre and the need for low-level bombing but they approved the raid in early 1945 after repeated requests. Once approval had been given, planning for the raid took several weeks; scale models of the target building and the surrounding city were built for use by pilots and navigators in preparation for a very low-level attack.

== Raid ==
The attacking force consisted of RAF de Havilland Mosquito F.B.VI fighter-bombers of No. 140 Wing RAF (comprising No. 21 Squadron RAF, No. 464 Squadron RAAF, and No. 487 Squadron RNZAF). The aircraft flew in three waves of six aircraft, with two reconnaissance Mosquito B.IVs from the Royal Air Force Film Production Unit to record the results of the attack. Thirty RAF Mustang fighters gave air cover from German aircraft and these also attacked anti-aircraft guns during the raid.

The force left RAF Fersfield in Norfolk in the morning and it reached Copenhagen after 11:00. The raid was carried out at rooftop level and during the first attack, a Mosquito hit a lamp post, damaging its wing and the aircraft crashed into garages near the Jeanne d'Arc School, about 1.5 km (0.93 mi) from the target, setting them on fire. Two bombers in the second and all but one in the third wave attacked the garages with conventional and napalm, believing it was the burning Shellhus target. The napalm set fire to the neighbourhood and the conventional bombs destroyed a portion of the school. A rescue effort to rescue the trapped children before the fire reached the school was partially successful.

== Results ==
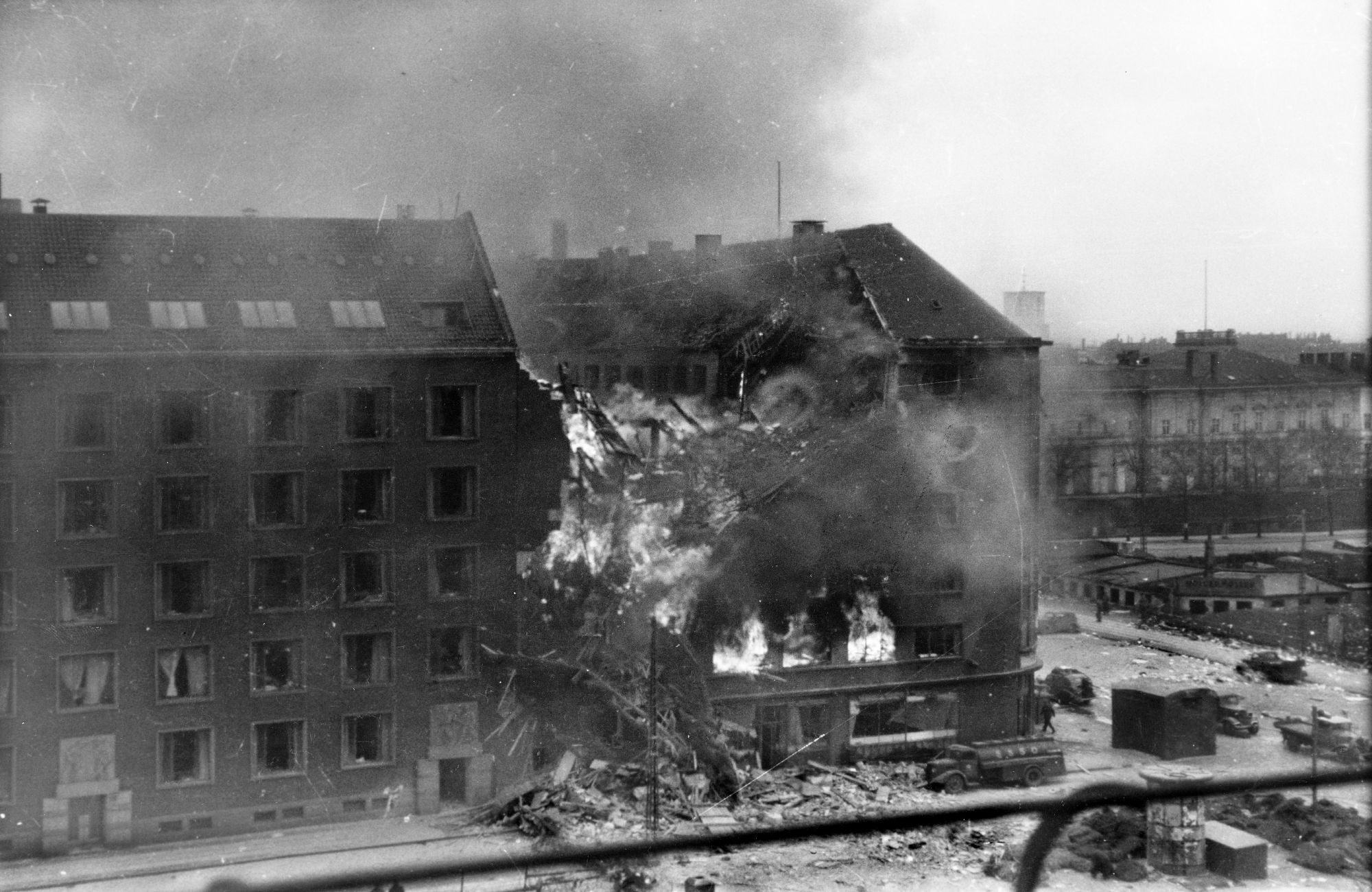
Shell House burning after the bombing raid

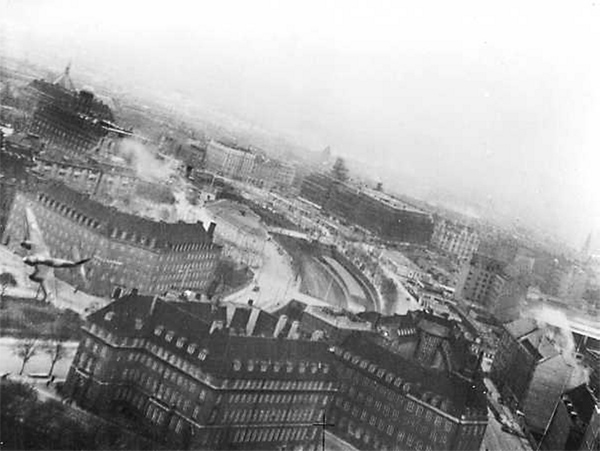
The Gestapo headquarters in the Shellhus, Copenhagen, in March 1945 during Operation Carthage. A de Havilland Mosquito pulling away after completing its bombing run is visible on the far left.

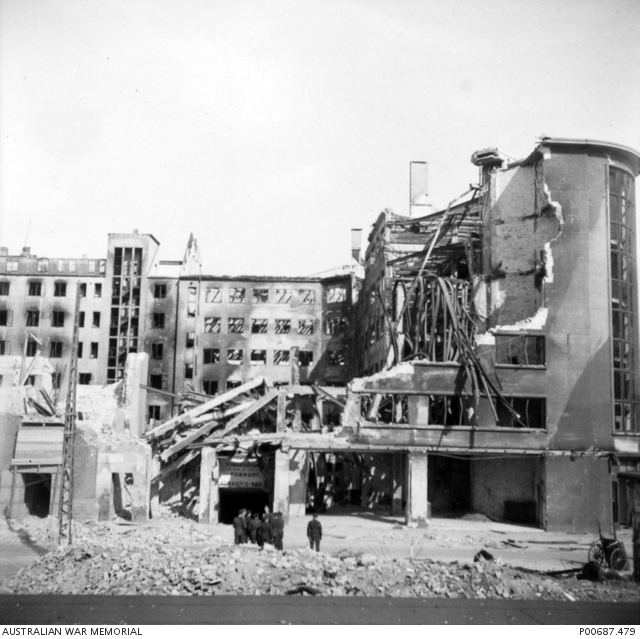
Aftermath: ruins of the Shell House

On the following day, a reconnaissance plane surveyed the target to assess the results. The damage was severe, with the west wing of the six-storey building reduced nearly to ground level. The Danish underground supplied a photograph showing the building burning from end to end.

The raid had destroyed the Gestapo headquarters and records, severely disrupting Gestapo operations in Denmark, as well as allowing the escape of 18 prisoners. Fifty-five German soldiers, 47 Danish employees of the Gestapo and eight prisoners died in the headquarters building. Four Mosquito bombers and two Mustang fighters were lost and nine airmen died on the Allied side.

On 14 July 1945, remains of an unidentified male casualty were recovered from the ruins of the Shellhus and transferred to the Department of Forensic Medicine of the University of Copenhagen. This happened again four days later and the two casualties were buried in Bispebjerg Cemetery on 4 and 21 September, respectively.

The attack on the school killed 87 children and 18 adults (10 nuns, two firemen, four civil teachers and two fathers who tried to save their children) as well as wounding 67 children and 35 adults. After the incident, the school never reopened. Most of the surviving children were transferred to another school, Institut Sankt Joseph. A monument in place of the school was inaugurated on 23 March 1953, to commemorate the children and adult civilians who died on the day.

The pilots involved in the operation were only told the true consequences of the raid after victory in Europe.

A movie The Shadow in My Eye, released in 2021, tells the stories of those children.

== See also ==
- Aarhus Air Raid, a similar attack on Gestapo headquarters in Aarhus, Denmark
- Operation Jericho, a similar attack on Amiens Prison in France
- Oslo Mosquito Raid (1942), a similar attack on Gestapo headquarters in Oslo, Norway
