= The Shadow in My Eye =

2021 Danish film by Ole Bornedal

- Film poster
- Directed by: Ole Bornedal
- Written by: Ole Bornedal
- Starring: Alex Høgh Andersen; Fanny Bornedal
- Cinematography: Lasse Frank Johannessen
- Edited by: Anders Villadsen
- Music by: Marco Beltrami; Buck Sanders; Ceiri Torjussen
- Release date: 18 October 2021
- Running time: 107 minutes
- Country: Denmark
- Languages: Danish; English; German

The Shadow in My Eye (Danish: Skyggen i mit øje), also known as The Bombardment, is a 2021 Danish war drama film written and directed by Ole Bornedal. The film deals with, among other things, Operation Carthage carried out by the Royal Air Force (RAF) in Copenhagen, Denmark during the Second World War, where one of the planes crashed near Institut Jeanne d'Arc, causing the school to be misidentified as the target and also bombed.

== Plot ==
In 1945, a Royal Air Force (RAF) de Havilland Mosquito strafes a car carrying several bridesmaids while flying over German-occupied Denmark, mistaking it for a German staff vehicle. The RAF pilots Pete and Andy learn about the accidental killing of civilians from the Danish Special Operation Executive agent Major Truelson.

A teenage boy named Henry is traumatized by the strafing incident and loses his ability to speak. His parents send him to Copenhagen with the hope of improving his mental health. While living in Copenhagen, Henry boards with his cousin Rigmor and her family. Henry also becomes acquainted with Rigmor's friend Eva. Rigmor and Eva attend the Institut Jeanne d'Arc, a French-language Catholic school run by nuns led by Sister Hanna. Rigmor and Eva help Henry to overcome his trauma including his fear of walking under open skies.

Meanwhile, a young novice named Sister Teresa struggles with her faith in God. In an attempt to prove God's existence, Teresa strikes an illicit romantic relationship with a HIPO officer named Frederik, who works for the German occupation authorities. Teresa also teaches Eva and Rigmor's class.

At the request of the Danish resistance, the RAF agrees to bomb the Shellhus, the Gestapo headquarters in Copenhagen with the goal of freeing imprisoned resistance members and destroying Gestapo documents. The planned Operation Carthage is complicated by the Germans imprisoning several Danish resistance hostages under the roof of the Shellhus. The air raid consists of several de Havilland Mosquito fighter-bombers from the RAF, the Royal Australian Air Force, and the Royal New Zealand Air Force, which are escorted by RAF P-51 Mustangs.

On the day of Operation Carthage, Eva argues with her parents over not finishing a bowl of porridge. Frederik, persuaded by Teresa, informs his parents that he is deserting the service. While Eva and Rigmor attend a class, Sister Hanna confronts Teresa over her relationship with Frederik and announces plans to expel her from their order. During the air raid, Peter and Andy's Mosquito fighter-bomber hits a searchlight tower, causing it to crash near the Institut Jeanne d'Arc. Other Mosquito fighter-bombers mistake the school for the target and bomb the building, killing and wounding numerous pupils and teachers. However, other RAF bombers succeed in targeting the Shellhus, damaging the building and destroying Gestapo documents. In the ensuing chaos, several Danish resistance prisoners take the opportunity to escape.

During the air raid, Henry gradually regains his ability to speak and assists firefighters with identifying some of the wounded children. Rigmor and Teresa are trapped under the rubble amidst rising water from fire hoses attempting to put out the flames above. Frederik attempts to rescue Teresa from the rubble, but she jumps into the water, possibly hoping to save Rigmor. This triggers the collapse of the basement. Eva's parents are distraught when they are unable to find their daughter, with her father regretting arguing with her. When Henry tells Eva's mother that Eva may have gone home, she finds her daughter at home eating the cold porridge.

== Cast ==
- Alex Høgh Andersen as Frederik, a HIPO officer
- Fanny Bornedal as Teresa, a novice
- Danica Curcic as Rigmor's mother
- Alban Lendorf as Peter
- Caspar Phillipson as Bateson
- Patricia Schumann as Director
- Morten Suurballe as Doctor
- James Tarpey as Andy
- Susse Wold as Prioress
- Rikke Louise Andersson as Frederik's mother
- Malene Beltoft Olsen as Eva's mother
- Ester Birch as Rigmor
- Bertram Bisgaard as Henry
- Mathias Flint as Executioner
- Joen Højerslev as Jailor
- Kristian Ibler as Eva's father
- Casper Kjær Jensen as Svend Nielsen
- Malena Lucia Lodahl as Greta
- Malthe Miehe-Renard as Ambulance doctor
- Ella Nilsson as Eva
- Ida Procter as Jenny
- Mads Riisom as Rigmor's father
- Maria Rossing as Henry's mother
- Jens Sætter-Lassen as Jailor
- Inge Sofie Skovbo as Sister Hanna
- Nicklas Søderberg Lundstrøm as Truelsen

== Distribution ==
The Shadow in My Eye was distributed in Denmark in October 2021. Netflix acquired the international distribution rights for the film, which was released under the name The Bombardment, in late March 2022.

== Criticism by family relatives ==
In the opening sequence, the film depicts a fictitious fatal air attack on a group of innocent women carried out by the RAF pilot Peter Kleboe, who later crashes by the school in the main bombing campaign. The family of the real life Peter Kleboe demanded an apology in one of the largest Danish newspapers, Berlingske, on 11 November 2021, and that the film be recut since it portrayed their family member as a killer of innocent victims and slandered his legacy. The following day, a producer for Miso Film stated that they had not intended to connect the fictional attack with real people, that editorial changes to the film would be made, and that they would contact the family members. According to film expert Peter Schepelern, it is unique for a film to be changed after its premiere because of complaints about the portrayal of historical figures.

== Historical research error ==
During the marketing of the film, the director Bornedal made claims that the film was based on the best possible research. Specifically, Bornedal claimed in several interviews and a television show that a key final scene of the film was based on a real life conversation between a nun and a dying child. However, when the Danish documentary filmmaker Martin Sundstrøm investigated the story, it turned out to be false. The conversation was between two nuns, and did not involve a dying child. Bornedal admitted the poor research and in a public response admitted that this might cast doubts on the historical accuracy of his film.
