= Betty Nansen Teatret =

Theatre in Frederiksberg, Copenhagen, Denmark

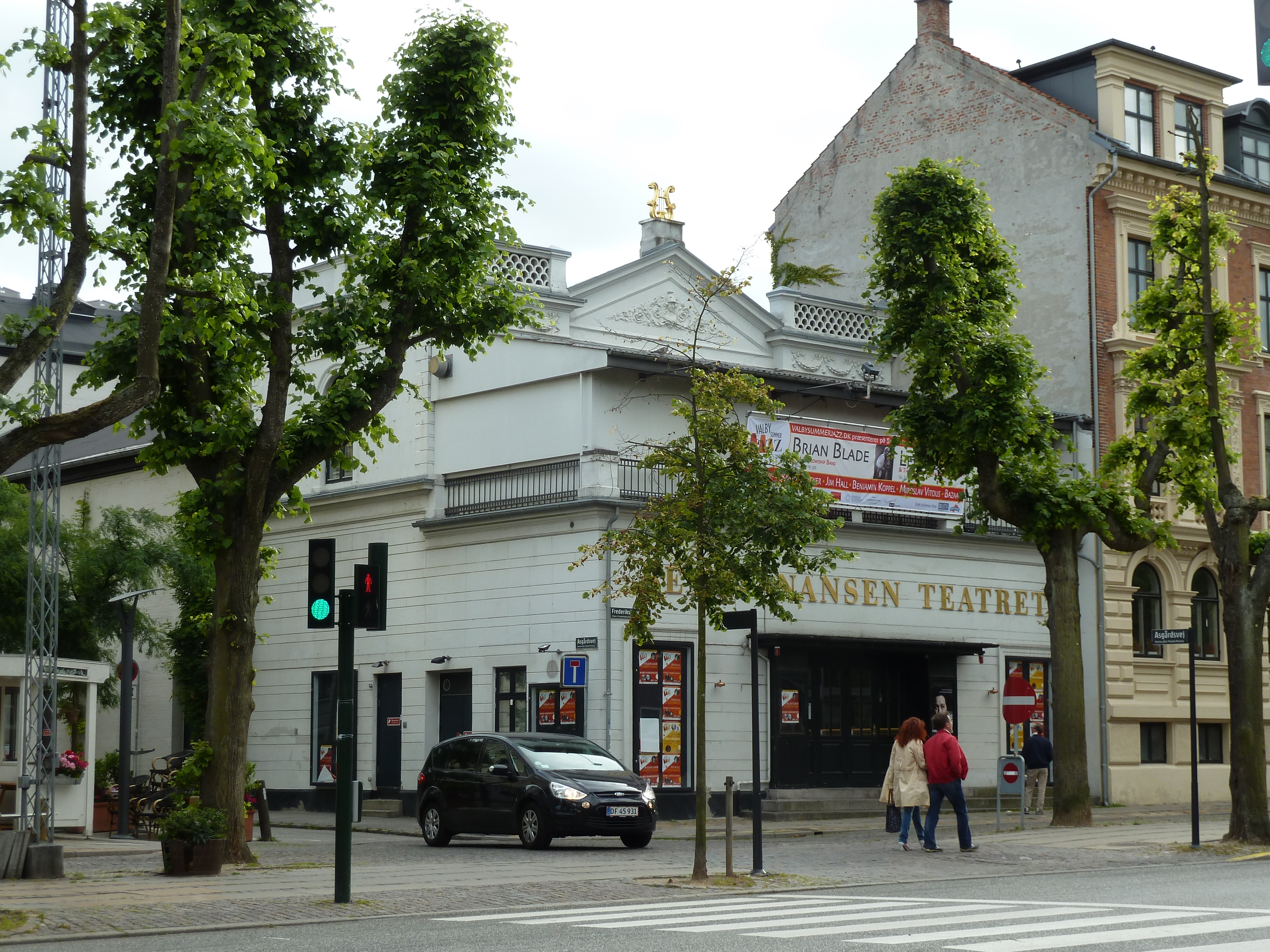
- The facade on Frederiksberg Allé
- Interactive map of Betty Nansen Teatret
- Address: Frederiksberg Allé, Frederiksberg; Copenhagen; Denmark
- Coordinates: 55.6741°N 12.5370°E
- Capacity: 775 numbered seats
- Type: Event venue (current)

Construction
- Opened: 1859

Website
- bettynansen.dk

Betty Nansen Teatret (Betty Nansen Theatre) is a theatre situated on Frederiksberg Allé in the Frederiksberg district of Copenhagen, Denmark. It takes its name from the actress Betty Nansen, who managed it from 1917 until her death in 1943.

== History ==
=== The first building ===
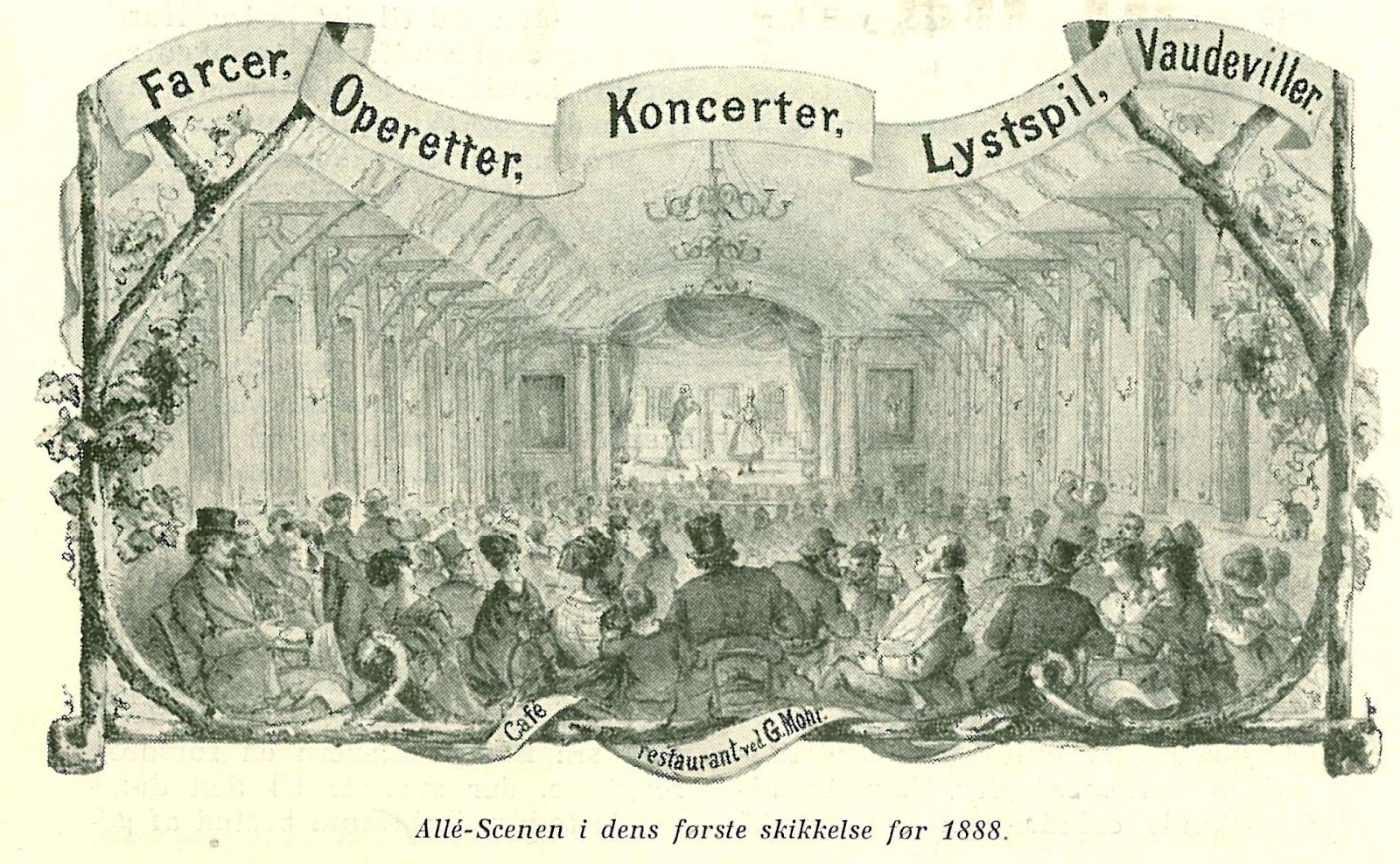
Frederiksberg Entertainment Theatre as it appeared before the rebuilding in 1888

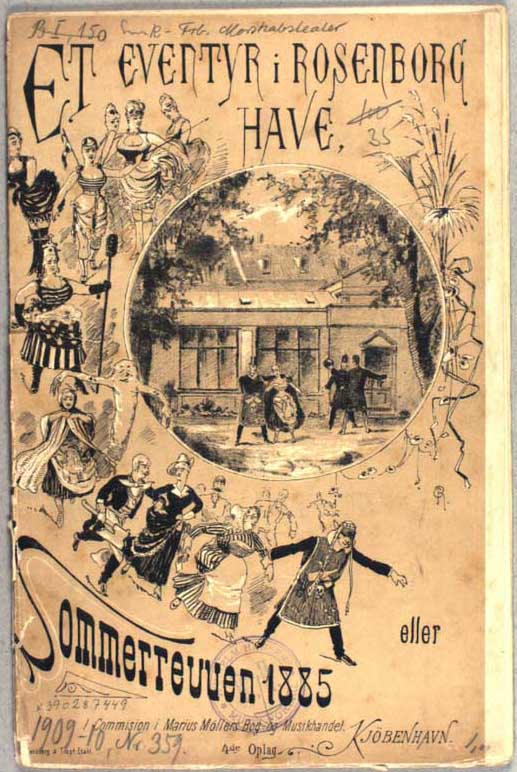
Poster for Frederiksberg Morskabsteater's 1885 summer revue Eventyr i Rosenborg Have

A beer garden called Odéon opened at the site of the current theatre in 1857 as part of the thriving entertainment district which formed along Frederiksberg Allé during the second part of the 19th century. It contained a wooden structure which was used for musical entertainment and had room for 1,200 guests who were seated at small tables.

In 1869 the actor Ferdinand Schmidt changed its name to Frederiksbergs Morskabsteater (English: Frederiksberg Entertainment Theatre) after obtaining a license to arrange theatrical performances, although only during the summer months and with a small cast. Vilhelm Petersen, who took over management of the theatre in 1875, introduced summer revues, a genre which had been seen sporadically in Denmark since 1849 but saw its first major success with Reisen til Maanen which premiered at the theatre on 2 August 1876. It played 170 times before going on tour to the provinces and was repeated the following year.

==== The new building ====
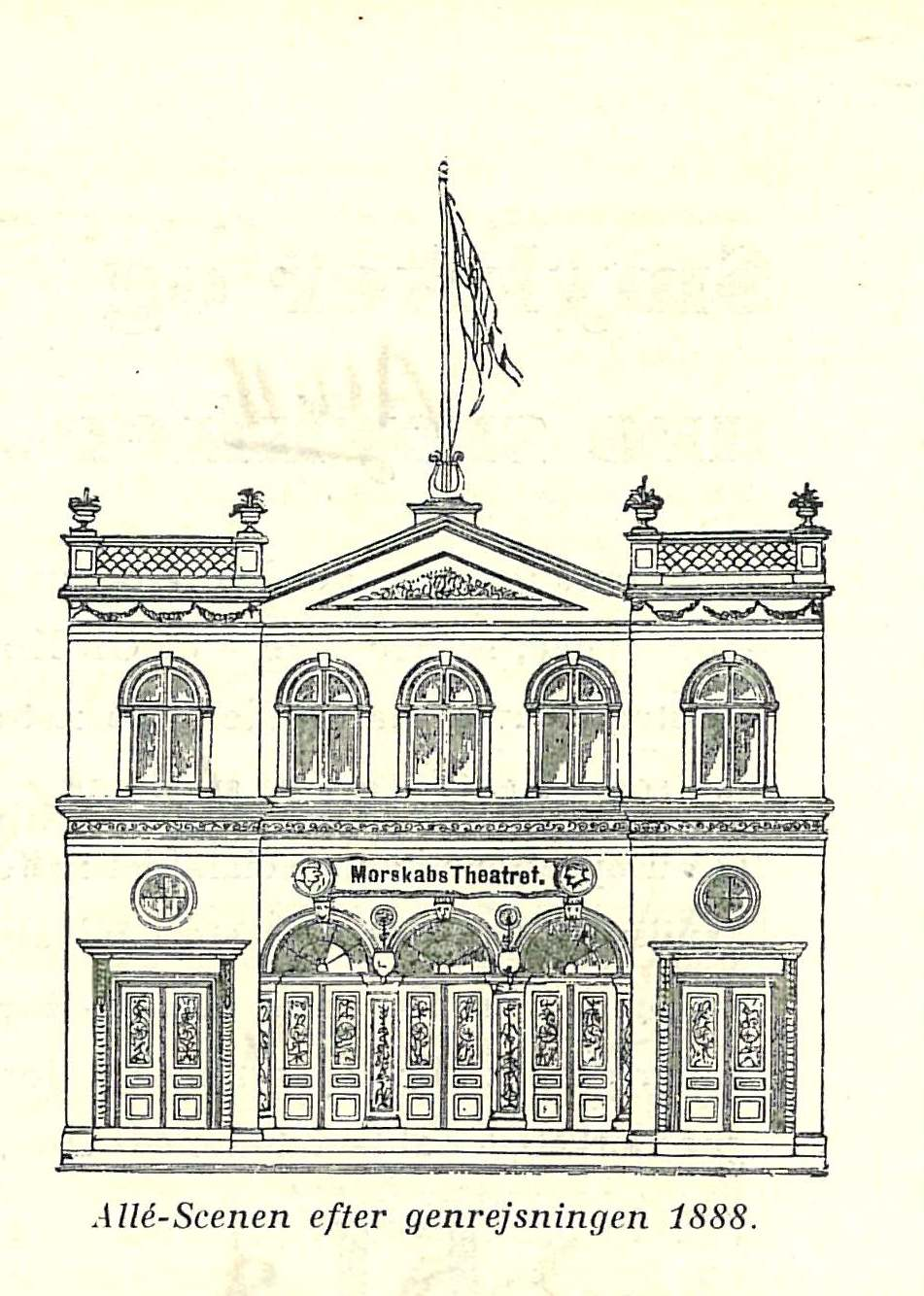
Frederiksberg Entertainment Theatre as it appeared before the rebuilding in 1888

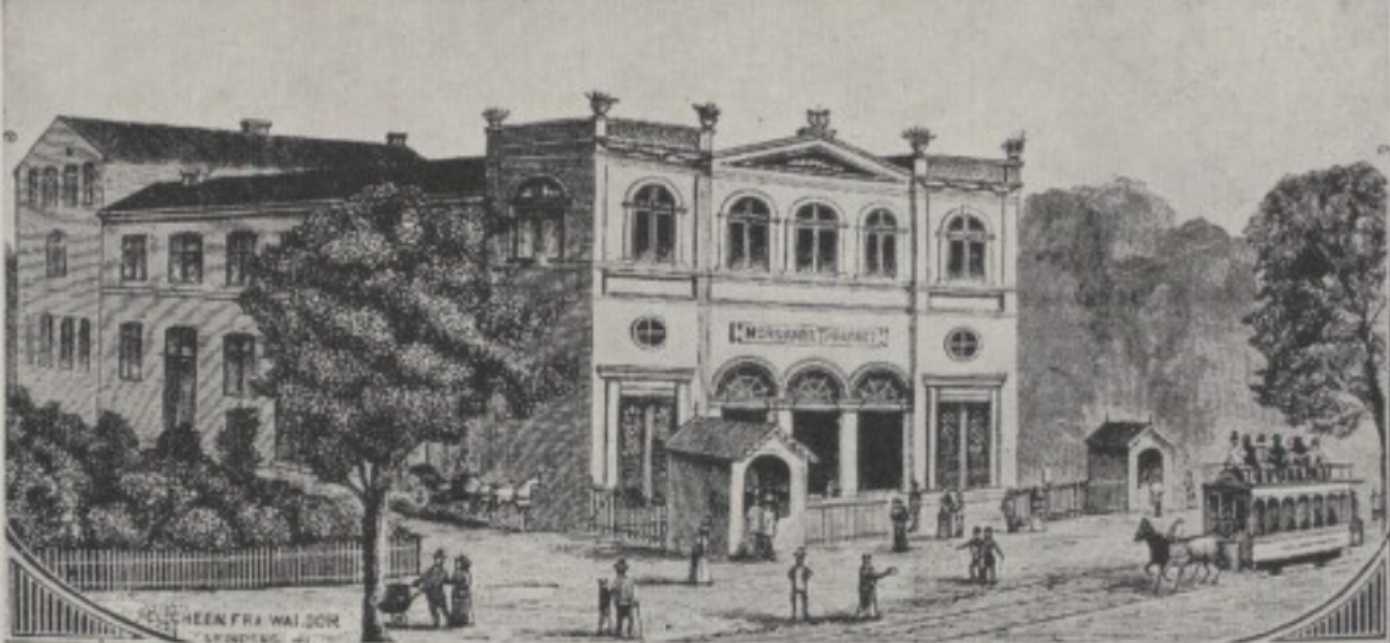
Morskabs Theatret, 1888

By 1888 the wooden pavilion was so worn down that it was demolished and a new building in brick, with a large stage and an auditorium with balconies, was built in its place. The new theatre was open all year round and featured a repertoire of farces, Comédies en vaudeville and revues.

The theatre changed its name to Frederiksberg Teater in 1904 and again in 1914 to Alexandrateatret after Christian IX's eldest daughter. Its profile gradually changed in a more serious and artistically ambitious direction with plays by George Bernard Shaw, Henrik Ibsen, Strindberg and Frank Wedekind.

=== Betty Nansen's era ===
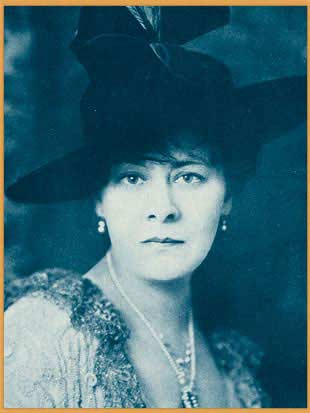
Betty Nansen

The actress Betty Nansen, who had just returned to Denmark after a failed attempt to make it as a film star in America, took over the theatre in 1917, naming it after herself. Alongside Henrik Bentzon, Nansen also directed many of the plays. In the 1930s, the theatre staged many of Kai Munk's plays, which had been neglected by the Royal Theatre, including Ordet in 1932, his controversial version of Hamlet (1935) and I brændingen in 1937.

Betty Nansen's era at the theatre ended with her death in 1943. It then changed its name to Alléscenen and began a period with changing directors and economic challenges which culminated in its bankruptcy in 1952.

=== Revival ===
In 1964, Bent Mejding revived the theatre under the name Ungdommens Teater, featuring mainly young British and American drama but also staging the musical Cabaret and theatre for children. In 1976, the name was changed back to Allé-scenen and the theatre became recognized as one of eight theatres in Copenhagen which received national funding under the landsdelsscene-programme ("regional theatres"). Morten Grunwald succeeded Meiding as theatre director in 1979, giving the theatre its current name.

In 1992, Grunwald was succeeded by Peter Langdal and Henrik Hartmann, who jointly led the theatre until 2015 when Langdal decided to leave the company.

== Stages ==
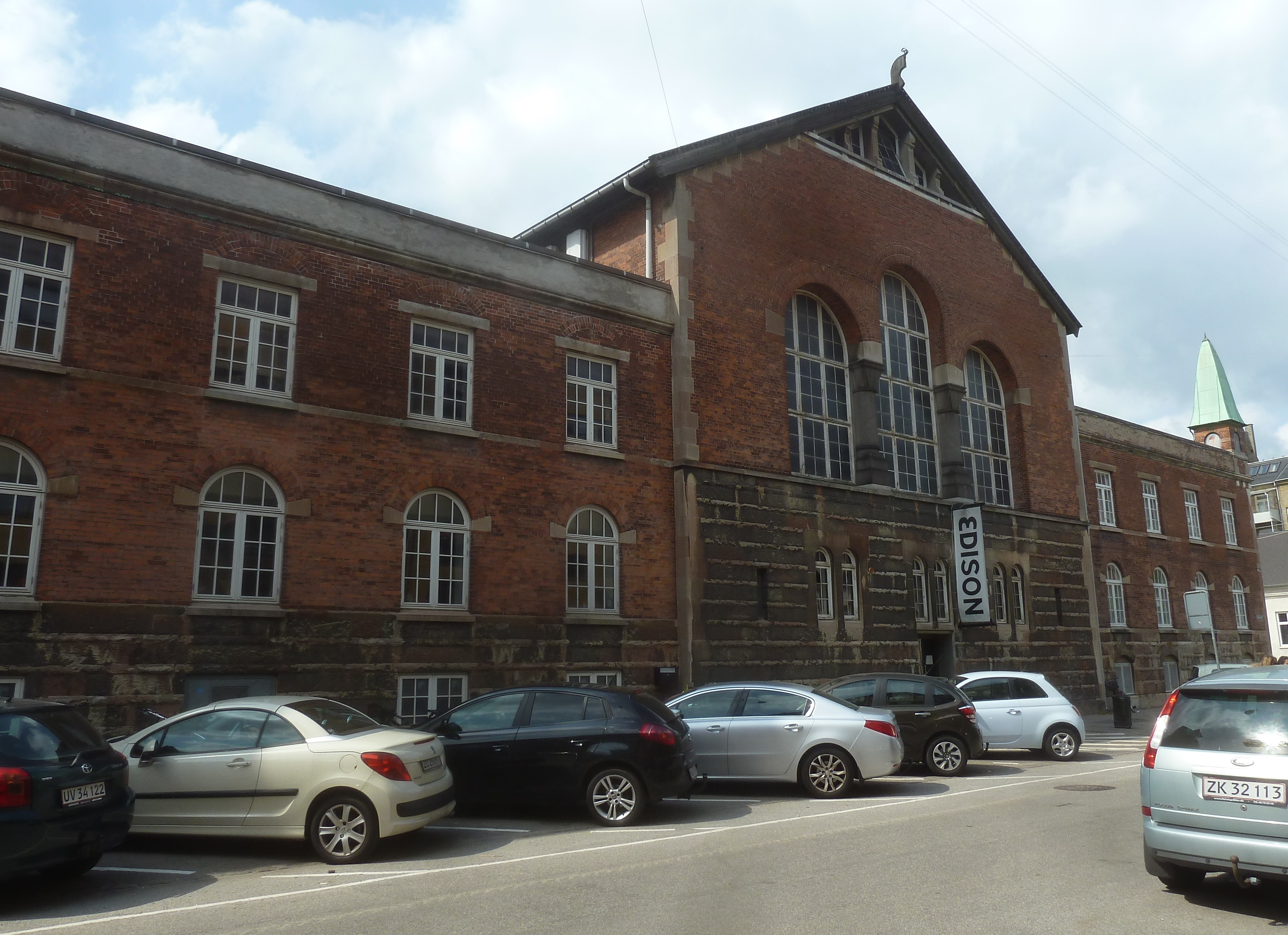
The Edison annex stage

The theatre has three stages. The main auditorium has 775 numbered seats. Lille Betty (Little Betty), originally Balkonscenen (The Balcony Stage), is the small stage. The Edison annex stage was introduced in 1992 and is located in a defunct power station on nearby Edisonsvej 10.
