= Fanny Bornedal =

Danish actress (born 2000)

Fanny Leander Bornedal
- Born: Fanny Leander Bornedal; 24 July 2000 (age 26); Denmark
- Occupation: Actress
- Years active: 2007–present

Fanny Bornedal (born 24 July 2000) is a Danish actress. Fanny is the daughter of film director Ole Bornedal.

== Filmography ==
Year	Title	Role	Notes
2007	Just Another Love Story	Clara	Film
2009	Fri Os Fra Det Onde	Viola	Film
2014	1864	Inge (12 year old)	TV series
2016	The Other World	Anna	Christmas calendar
2018	The Bridge	Julia	TV series
2018	The Purity of Vengeance	Young Nete	Film
2020	Equinox	Amelia	TV series
2021	Face to Face	Saphire	TV series
2022	The Shadow in My Eye	Teresa	Film
2022	Carmen Curlers	Kathrine	TV Series
2023	Nightwatch: Demons Are Forever	Emma Bork	Film
