= Frederiksberg Allé =

Street in Copenhagen, Denmark

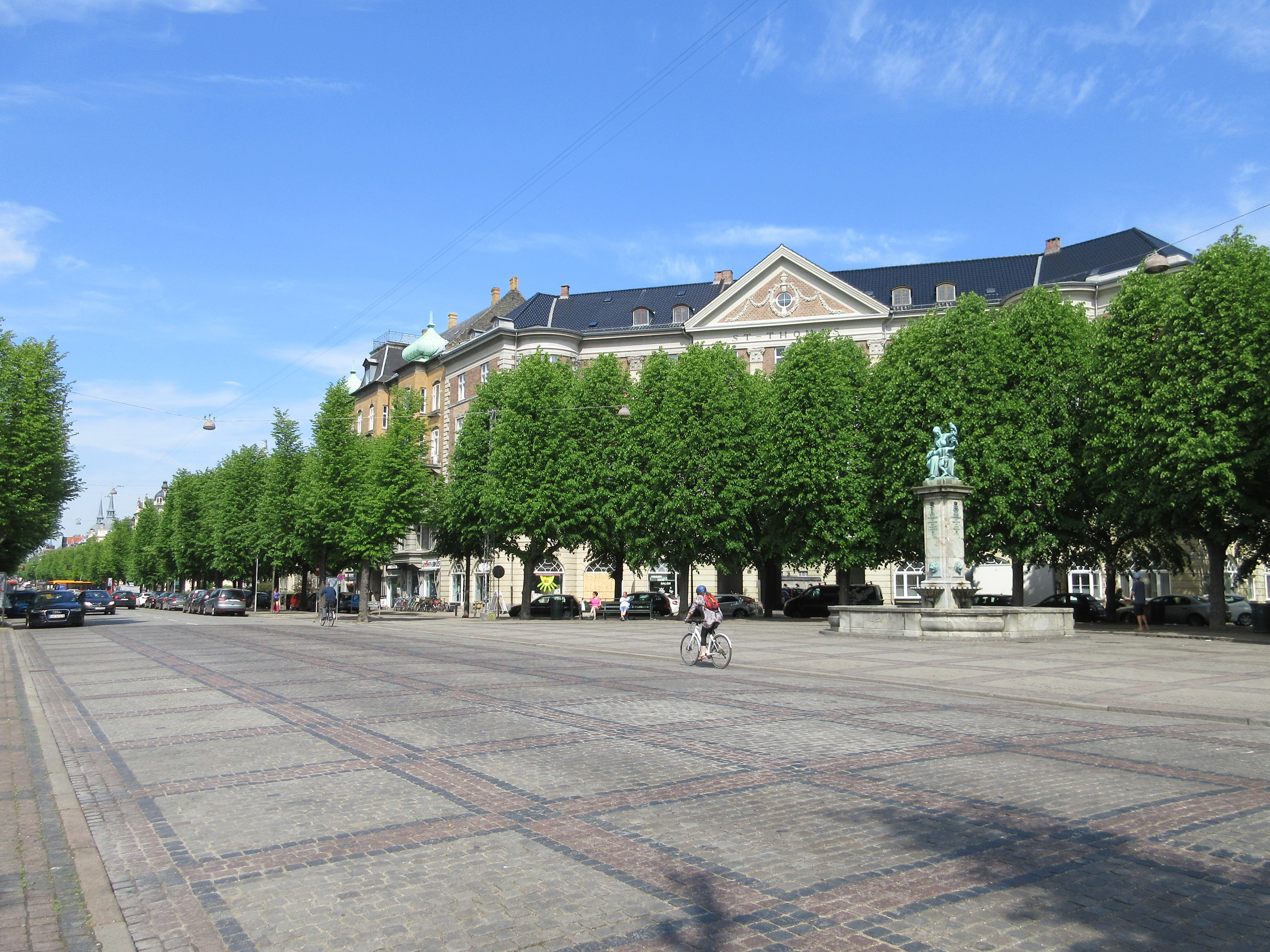
- Length: 1,140 m (3,740 ft)
- Location: Copenhagen, Denmark
- Quarter: Frederiksberg
- Postal code: 1820
- Nearest metro station: Frederiksberg Allé
- Coordinates: 55°40′26″N 12°32′30″E
- Southeast end: Vesterbrogade
- Major junctions: Alhambravej
- Northwest end: Frederiksberg Runddel

Frederiksberg Allé is a tree-lined avenue which runs through the southernmost part of the Frederiksberg district of Copenhagen, Denmark. It connects Vesterbrogade at Værnedamsvej to Frederiksberg Runddel in front of the main entrance to Frederiksberg Gardens. It was originally constructed in 1704 as the king's private road leading to his new summer residence, Frederiksberg Palace. It developed into the backbone of an entertainment district in the mid 18th century, and has continued to be associated with theatres until the present day. The avenue is lined with two double rows of linden trees and bisects Sankt Thomas Plads, a small round plaza, shortly after its departure from Vesterbrogade.

== History ==
=== The king's private road ===
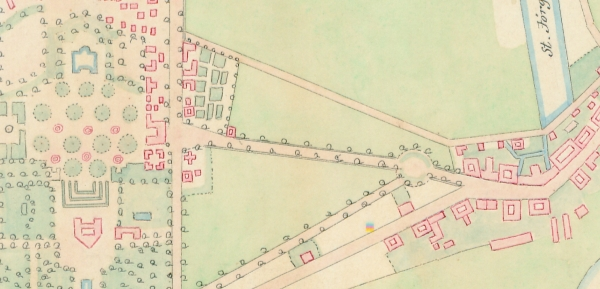
Frederiksberg Allé on a map detail from 1772

The crown took over the area at the far end of Frederiksberg Allé after Ny Hollænderby, a settlement of Dutch farmers which had been located at the site, had burned down in 1697, and a new summer residence for Frederick IV was built on a local hilltop between 1699 and 1703. Completed the following year, with inspiration from France, Frederiksberg Allé was established to provide the king a private road, a Route de Roi, between the main road out of Copenhagen's Western City Gate and his new palace with its extensive adjoining gardens. The new avenue was known as the king's new road as opposed to the king's old road Gammel Kongevej.

=== Country houses and villas ===
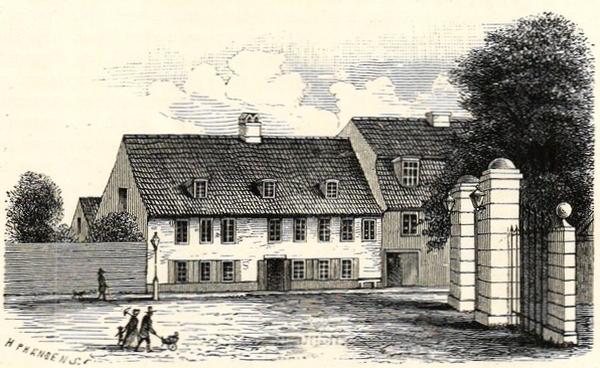
The Iron Gate at Frederiksberg Allé

A number of country houses for wealthy Copenhageners were built along the north side of the avenue in the years after 1780, such as Sommerro, Vennersly, Sans Souci and Alléenberg. In 1785 King Christian VII installed a large iron gate at the site where the avenue diverged from Vesterbrogade. Apart from the king only the new land owners were given a key.

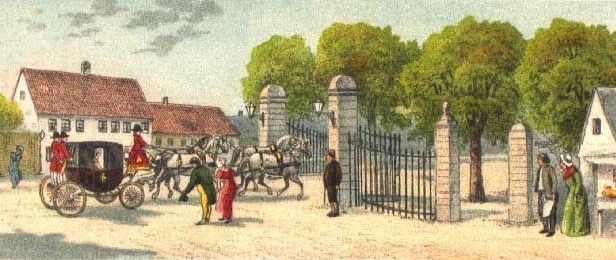
A royal at the Iron Gate, c. 1800

Frederiksberg Allé was finally opened to private traffic in 1833. The iron gate was dismantled in 1862 and later installed at Søndermarken's entrance on the corner of Pile Allé and Roskildevej. The south side of the street had long remained more open but in the years after 1850 it was built over with private villas.

=== An entertainment area ===
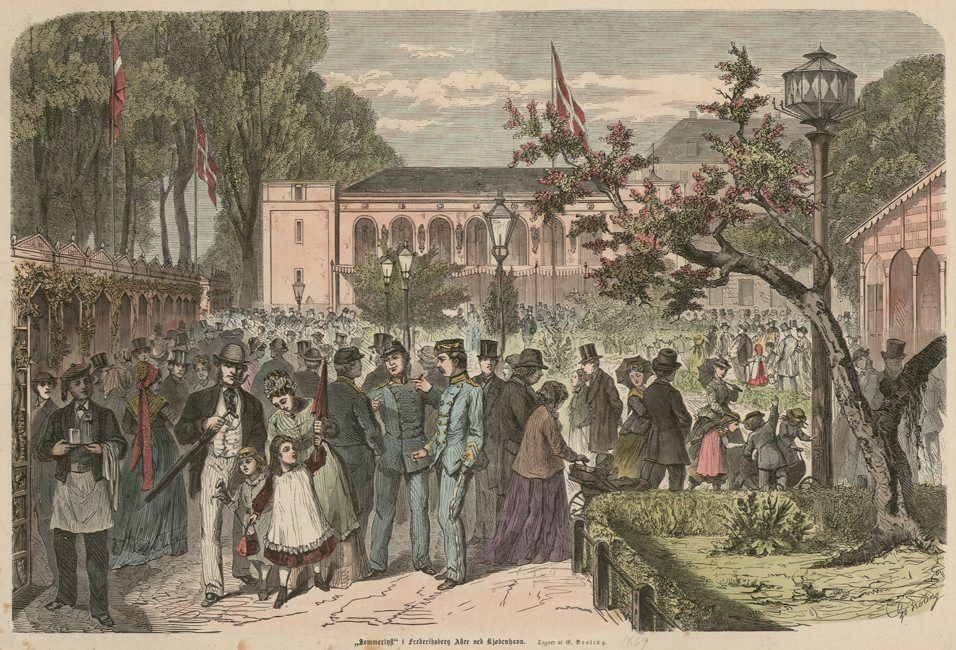
The Sommerlyst establishment in 1869

The area outside Frederiksberg Palace gardens had thrived as a fashionable destination for excursions ever since the construction of the palace in the first decade of the 18th century. When Frederiksberg Allé, as well as the palace gardens were opened to the public, and Copenhagen's fortifications were decommissioned, allowing for more robust constructions outside the city, numerous pleasure gardens and entertainment establishments sprung up along the street. One of the most popular places was Sommerlyst, a large pleasure garden which opened in 1834 at the end of Frederiksberg Allé. It had pavilions, flower beds, a merry-go-round, ferris wheels and a bandstand.

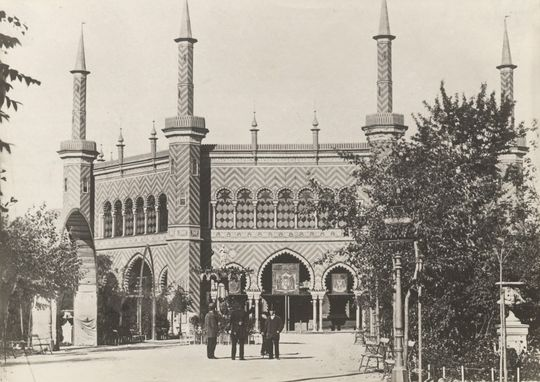
The Alhambra complex

Further down the street. Georg Carstensen, after leaving Tivoli Gardens which he had founded in 1843, opened a large entertainment complex in Moorish style named Alhambra in 1857. It contained the largest concert hall in Copenhagen which seated 2,000. It was never a success and the buildings were torn down in 1870. Another concert hall, Odeon, which opened the same year as Alhambra, was converted into the Frederiksberg Entertainment Theatre in 1869. Sommerlyst's old main building was torn down in 1855 and replaced with a larger one which contained a theatre and concert space. It was designed by H. C. Stilling who had also worked for Tivoli and Alhambra.

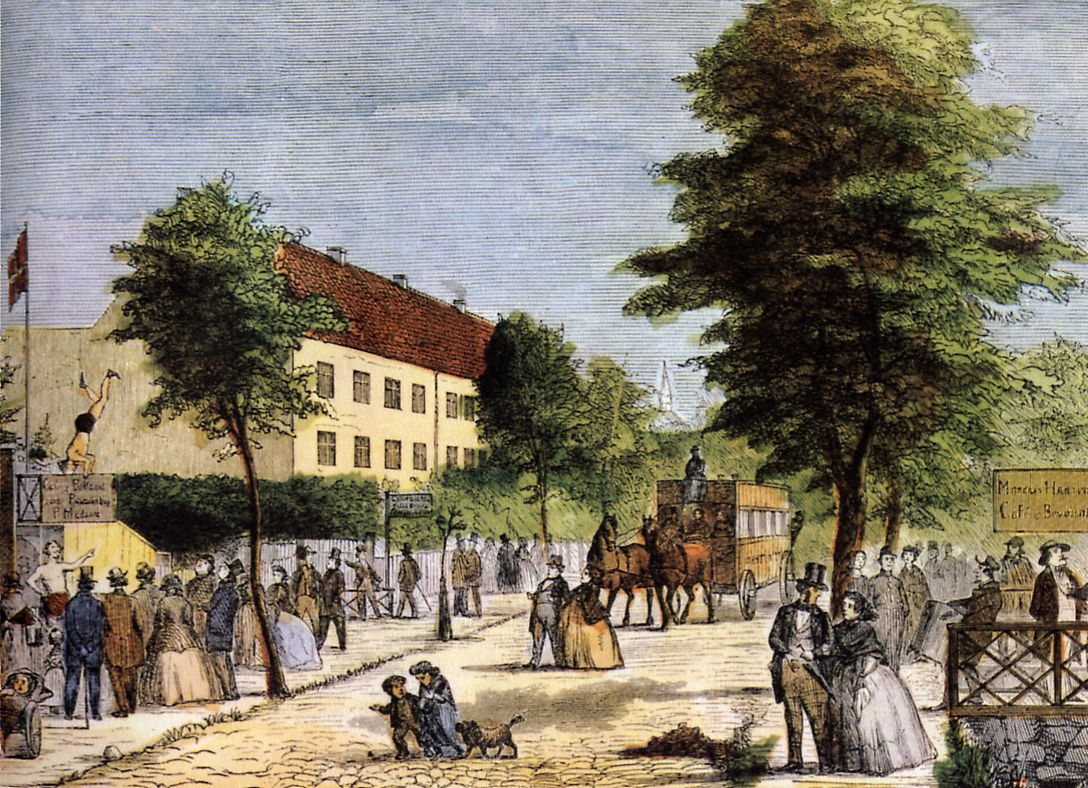
Frederiksberg Allé on an undated drawing

Other popular venues were Valhalla, Schweizer Pavillon, Sankt Thomas and Rosenfryd. They all combined dining with female singers and various other forms of entertainment. Located in one of the former country houses, Sankt Thomas had an anatomic museum and waxworks in a lateral wing, and in 1897 added sports to the palette of entertainment when Magnus Bech-Olsen became a world champion in wrestling by defeating the Turkish Sultan's court wrestler.

=== 20th century ===
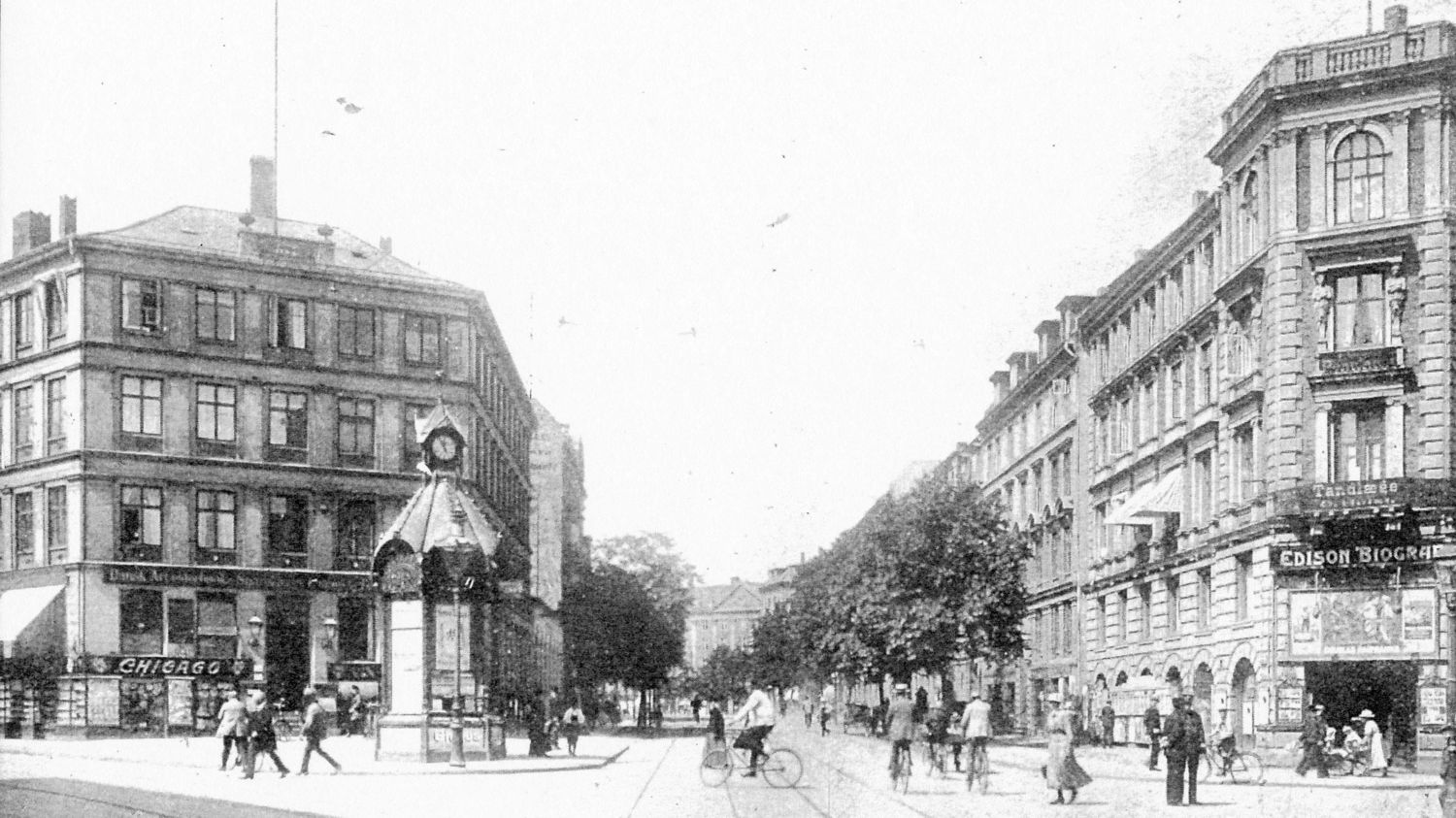
The beginning of Frederiksberg Allé from Vesterbrogade

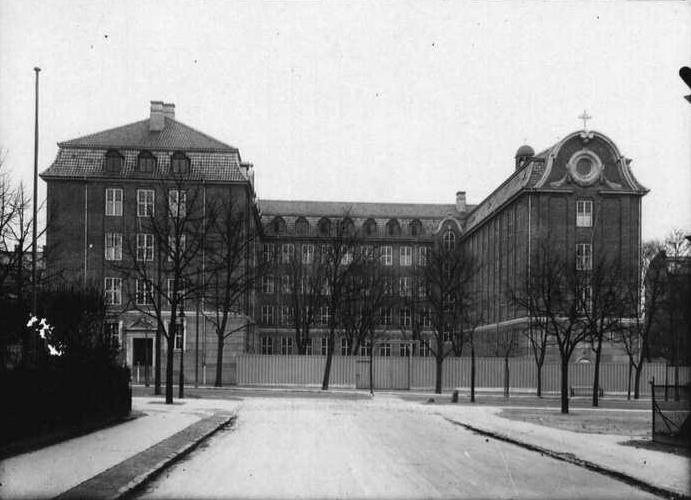
Institut Jeanne d'Arc photographed shortly after its completion in 1924

At the turn of the century, time ran out for the pleasure gardens and Frederiksberg Allé started to change character. The country houses and villas were pulled down and replaced with denser developments, mostly apartment buildings, although theatres continued to characterize the area. The Fønix Theatre opened in 1919. Frederiksberg Entertainment Theatre was, after for a while serving as a cinema, from 1917 to 1943 owned by the actress Betty Nansen and is now named the Betty Nansen Theatre after her. The ABC Theatre opened at No. 80 in 1949 and developed into one of the most important venues for revues in the 1950s and 1960s under the leadership of Stig Lommer.

In 1924 a Roman Catholic girls school, the Institut Jeanne d'Arc, was built at No. 74. During Second World War when Denmark was occupied by Nazi Germany, the school was accidentally bombed on 21 March 1945 in Operation Carthage, a British air raid which targeted the Gestapo headquarters in the Shell House in the city centre, killing 86 school children.

== Buildings ==
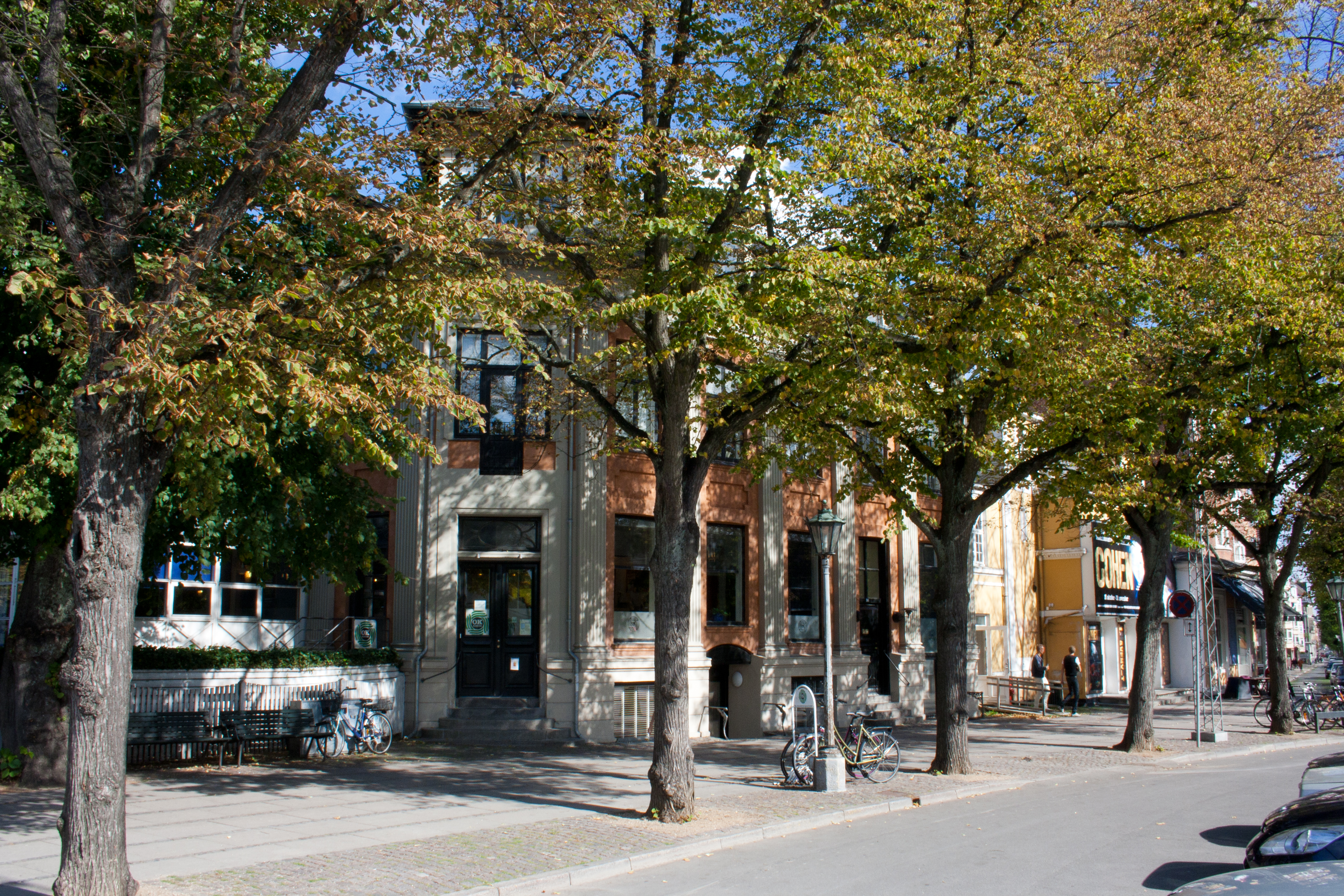
No. 104

No. 23, on the corner with Kingosgade, is known as Little Rosenborg due to its Neo-Renaissance style with two small towers and rich decorations, although its resemblance to Christian IV's Rosenborg Castle can hardly be described as striking. It was designed by Johan Daniel Herholdt´in collaboration with Christian V. Nielsen and completed in 1857.

No. 104, on the corner of Allégade, was completed in 1871 to designs by Johan Schrøder and was listed in 1978.

== Frederiksberg Allé today ==
One of the most exclusive addresses in Frederiksberg, and in Copenhagen, Frederiksberg Allé is today known for its upmarket boutiques and cafés. In particular, Frederiksberg locals like to walk the broad boulevard and frequent the traditional french-style brasserie Promenaden and the classic bar Frederik VI. Both feature photos of local vedettes and writers, who have enjoyed their time there.

Remaining theatres on the avenues are Betty Nansen Theatre at No. 57, the former Frederiksberg Theatre which is now named after its former director and Aveny-T, at No. 102, based in Sommerlyst's old main building from 1855.

== See also ==
- Lorry, Frederiksberg
