= Alex Høgh Andersen =

Danish actor (born 1994)

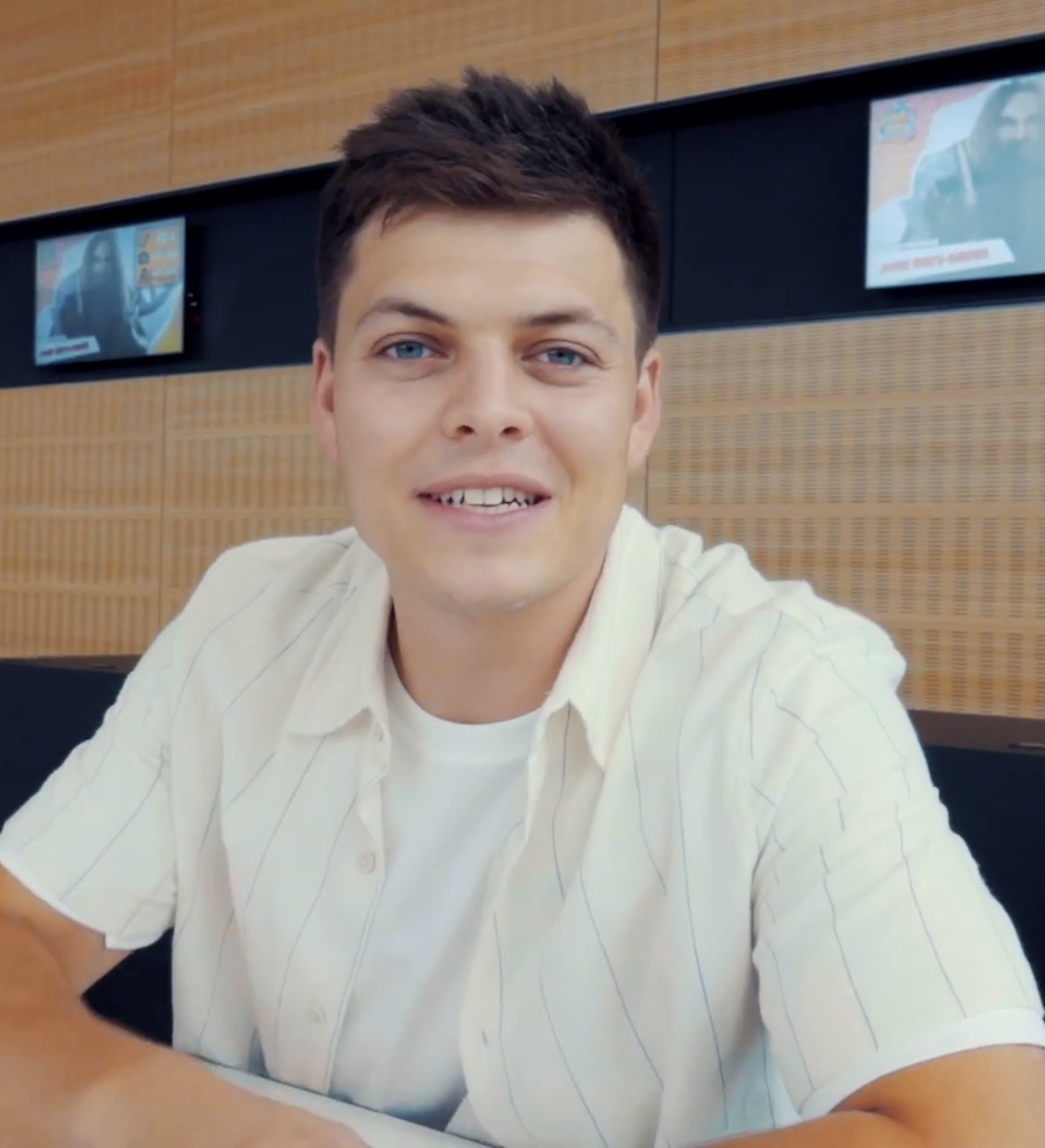
- Andersen at the German Comic Con 2021
- Born: Alex Høgh Andersen; 20 May 1994 (age 31); Slagelse, Denmark
- Occupations: Actor, model and photographer
- Years active: 2012–present

Alex Høgh Andersen (born 20 May 1994) is a Danish actor. He is mostly known for the role of Ivar the Boneless in the historical drama television series Vikings (2016–2020).

== Early life ==
Andersen was born in the small town of Skælskør, in the western part of Sjælland (Zealand) in Denmark, the son of Thomas Andersen and Charlotte Høgh. He became very fond of acting during drama studies at school, rather than in other subjects. He participated in many musical plays and took some leading roles.

At the age of 17, Andersen decided he wanted to learn to act in front of a camera, and he went on to do Film and Media Studies at the University of Copenhagen (2014–2015). He started university in 2014, but dropped out in 2015 for the filming of Vikings on location in Ireland.

== Career ==
In 2015, he was in the film A War. In 2016, he played the role of Ivar the Boneless, future king, and son of Ragnar Lothbrok (played by Travis Fimmel), in the historical drama television series Vikings for three seasons between 2016 and 2020.

In 2021, he starred as Frederik in the Netflix film The Bombardment/The Shadow in My Eye. In 2022, he played Claus Malmqvist in the miniseries The Viking - Downfall of a Drug Lord. In 2023, he starred as Bjørn Jepsen in Those Who Kill. In 2024, he played Emil Veggem in season 2 of the British television series Granite Harbour, and in the same year, played Emil Anderson in six episodes of the Viaplay Danish comedy-drama series Call me Dad.

=== Interests and hobbies ===
In his free time, Andersen is a keen photographer; he is visually-minded, and is constantly learning about cameras during his experience in the film industry. In addition, he learned dancing, singing, sports, fencing and stunts.

== Filmography ==
=== Film ===
Year	Title	Role	Notes
2014	Big Hero 6	Hiro Hamada (voice)	Danish version
2015	A War	Anders Holm	Also known as Krigen
2019	How to Train Your Dragon: The Hidden World	Eret (voice)	Danish version
2021	The Bombardment/The Shadow in My Eye (Danish: Skyggen i mit øje)	Frederik	Netflix film
2023	Nightwatch: Demons Are Forever	Frederik	Shudder film
2024	The Room Next Door	Fred	
TBA	Red, White & Royal Wedding	TBA	Post-production

=== Television ===
Year	Title	Role	Notes
2012	Outsider	Victor	Main role; miniseries
2013	Tvillingerne & Julemanden	William Iversen	Main role
2015	Hedensted High	Flotte Tjelle	Episode: "Kantinedamen"
2016–2020	Vikings	Ivar the Boneless	Main role (seasons 4–6)
2022	The Viking - Downfall of a Drug Lord	Claus Malmqvist	Main role; miniseries
2023	Those Who Kill (Danish: Den Som Dræber)	Bjørn Jepsen	4 episodes (season 3)
2024	Call me Dad (Danish: Kald mig far)	Emil	Viaplay; 6 episodes
2024	Granite Harbour (Danish: Granit Havn)	Emil Veggem	3 episodes (season 2)
2026	Dansk Melodi Grand Prix 2026	Himself	Host

== Theater ==
Year	Title	Role	Notes
2007	Østen for solen og vesten for månen	PS (Prins Sebastian)	
2009	1001 nats eventyr	Ali	
2010	Sværdet i Stenen	Arthur Pendragon	Main role
2011	Herkules	Dionysos	
