= Gammel Kongevej =

Street in Copenhagen

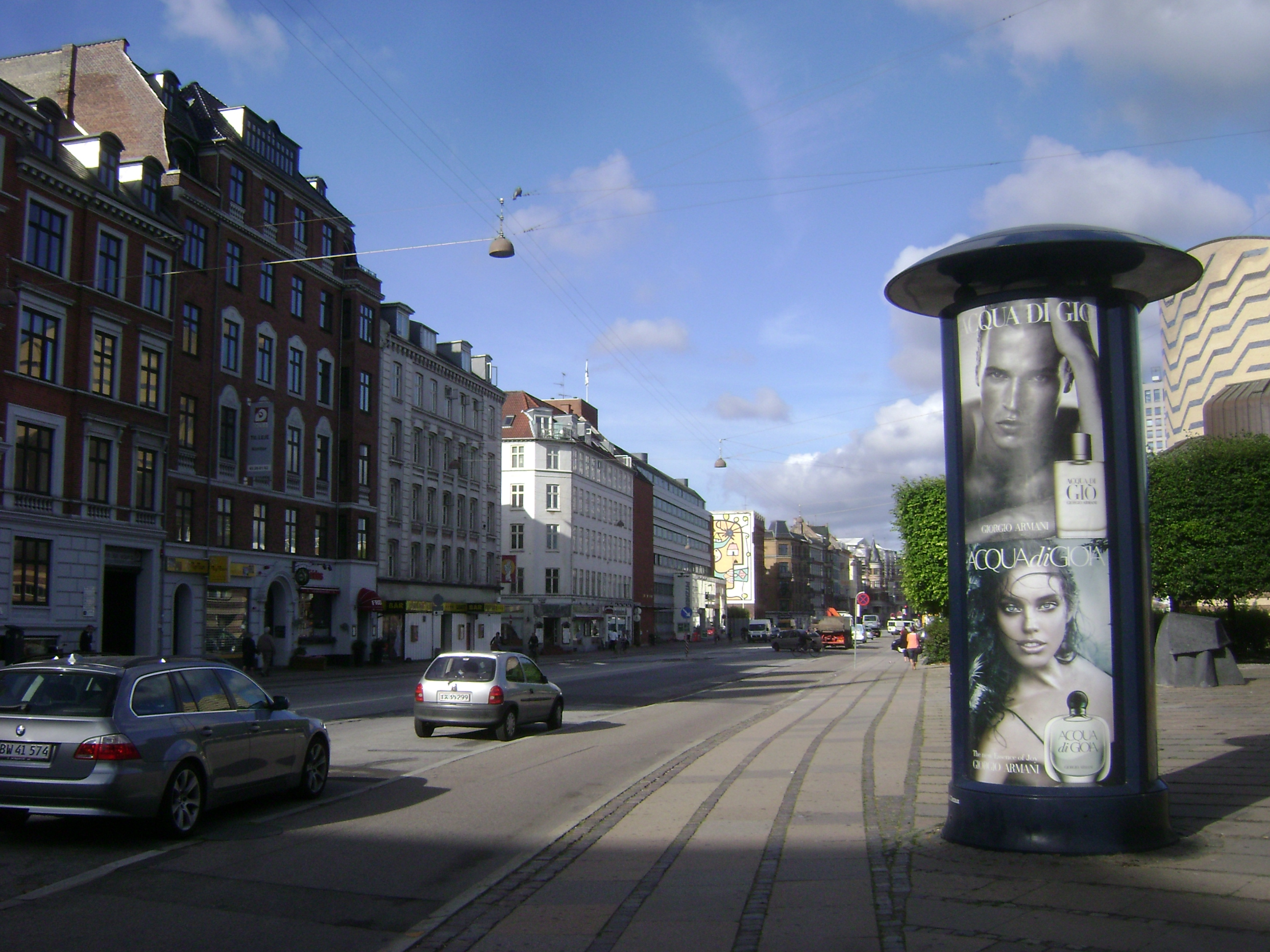
- Interactive map of Gammel Kongevej
- Length: 1,800 m (5,900 ft)
- Location: Copenhagen, Denmark
- Quarter: Frederiksberg
- Postal code: 1619, 1859
- Nearest metro station: Frederiksberg Allé
- Coordinates: 55°40′32.85″N 12°32′39.11″E
- Southeast end: Jernbanevej
- Major junctions: Alhambravej
- Northwest end: Smallegade

Gammel Kongevej (lit. 'Old King's Road') is the principal shopping street of Frederiksberg in Copenhagen, Denmark. Running roughly parallel to Frederiksberg Allé and Vesterbrogade, it extends from Vesterport station at the southern end of The Lakes and continues for some 1.8 km west to Frederiksberg City Hall Square where it continues as Smallegade. In the opposite end, Jernbanegade connects it to Copenhagen City Hall Square.

== History ==
=== 17th and 18th century ===
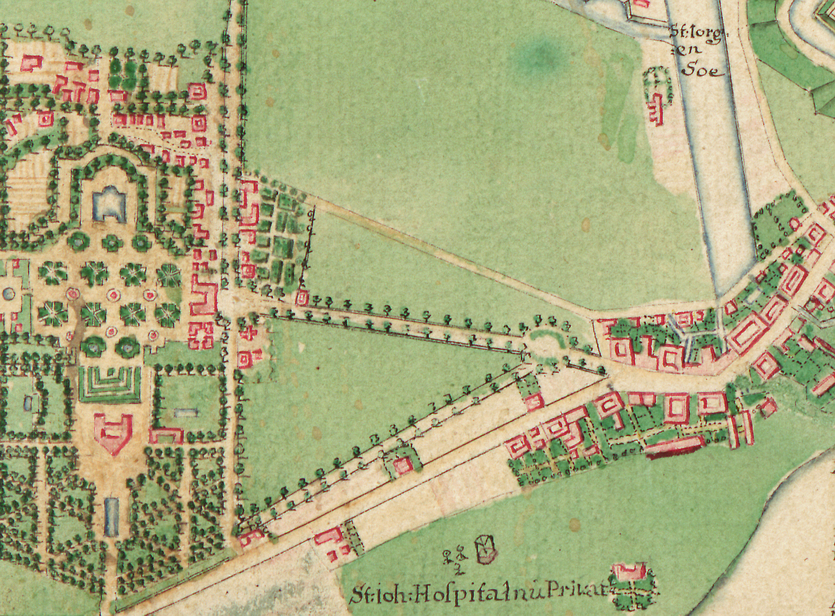
Gammel Kongevej seen on a map detail from the 18th century

Gammel Kongevej is one of the oldest road sections in Frederiksberg, originally providing a direct connection between Copenhagen's Western City Gate and the historic village of Solbjerg (no longer in existence). From there the road continued past the Damhus Lake towards Roskilde, giving rise to the name Roskildegaden ("The Roskilde Street"), which is seen in some documents from the beginning of the 17th century.

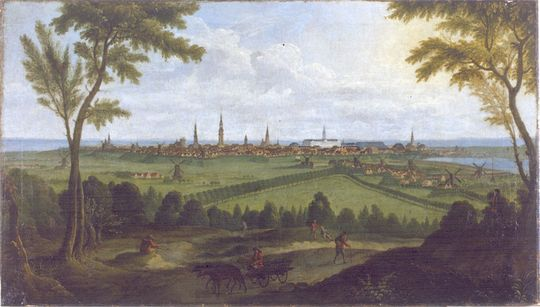
Gammel Kongevej and Vesterbrogade seen diverging from Valby Hill in 1758

The road was improved by Christian IV in the 1620s. The name Kongevejen (English: King's Road) emerged about a generation later when it became the principal road to Ny Amager (New Amager), as Frederiksberg was then called, where the king had several properties. The name of the road changed to Gammel Kongevej after a new Route de Roie, Frederiksberg Allé, opened in 1705.

=== 19th century ===
The road passed through open countryside with only a few scattered country houses until the mid-19th century when Copenhagen's fortifications were decommissioned and the city was allowed to develop freely. A number of new country houses were built along the road but most of them were replaced by multi-story apartment buildings with shops in the ground floors in the 1880s and 1890s.

=== 20th century ===
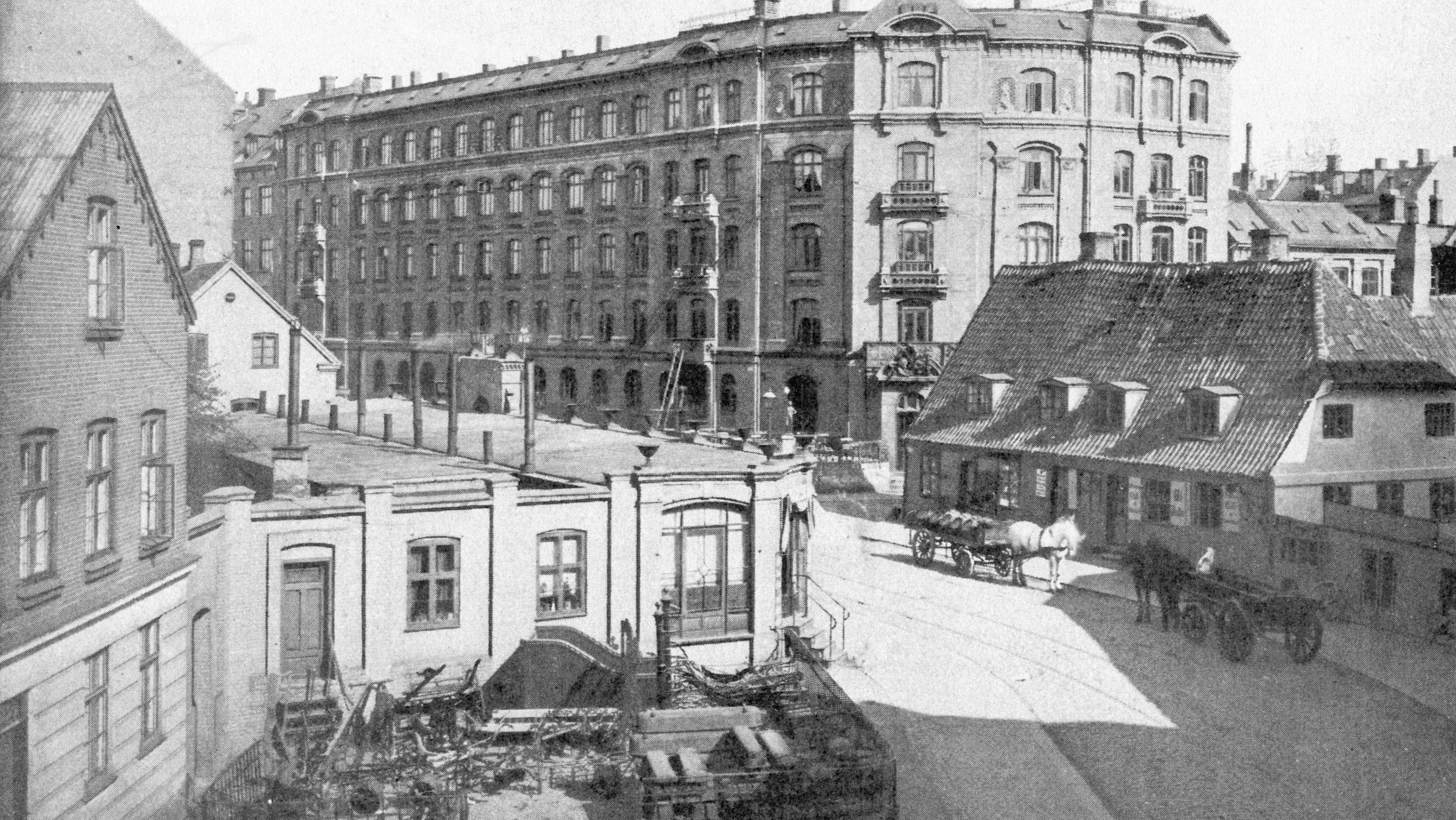
Gammel Kongevej in 1909: One of the old country houses to the right and the former iron foundry on the left, both now demolished

P. Andersen opened the Svanholm Brewery at No. 64 in 1853. It was merged with several other breweries to form The United Breweries in 1891 and most of its buildings were replaced by a machine factory and iron factory.

Part of the site was cleared in 1904–05 to make way for the new street Prinsesse Maries Allé. The rest of the industrial plant was replaced by the cinema complex Kinopalæet in 1918.

Gammel Kongevej mainly catered to the middle and upper middle classes. The area next to the iron foundry was home to a small working-class neighbourhood with an infamous reputation. In the 1950s, Jørn Utzon, architect of the Sydney Opera House, drafted a project for the area which was never built. It consisted of tower blocks in a green space inspired by Japanese gardens.

== Notable buildings and residents ==
The apartment building at Gammel Kongevej 25 hides the former buildings of Emil Messerschmidt's Tannery. The current buildings, a three-winged complex, were built after a fire in 1867. It is one of relative few examples of the many minor industrial enterprises that once dominated the courtyard of Copenhagen's Vesterbro and Nørrebro districts.

Dating from the 1850s, No. 78 is one of the oldest apartment buildings along the street. It has a small front garden with a fence towards the street. The Catholic school Ansgarstiftelsen at No. 15 is decorated with a mural by Niels Macholm.

Just off Gammel Kongevej, between the streets H.C. Ørsteds Vej and Bülowsvej, is a small enclave which has been described as Denmark's first urban neighbourhood of single-family detached homes. It consists of the side streets Uraniavej and Lindevej.

The area around Sankt Jørgens Sø is home to a cluster of modern buildings which include the Tycho Brahe Planetarium and two highrises, Copenhagen Scandic Hotel and the 18-storey Codan Building.

== Gallery ==
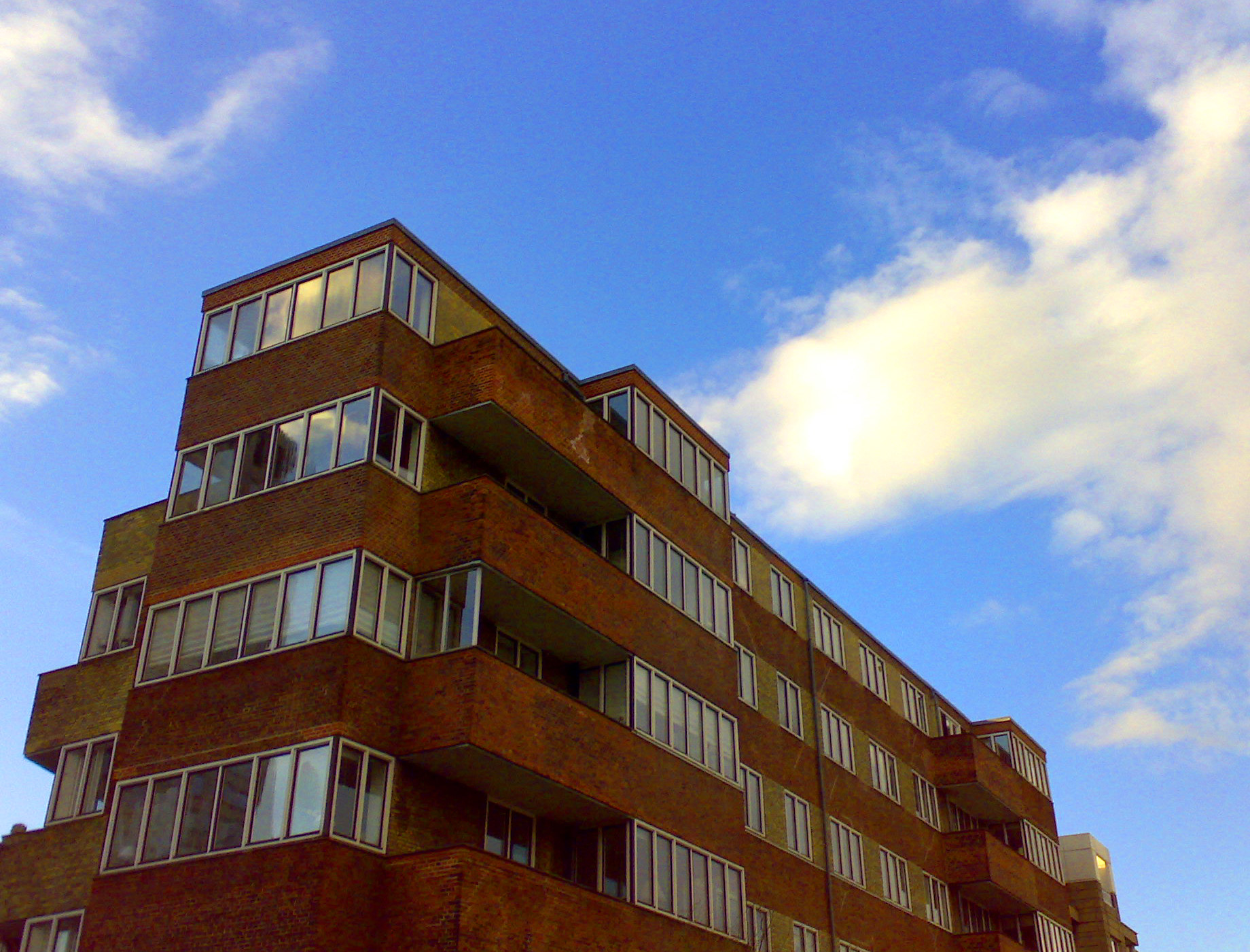
"The Hot Iron"" at

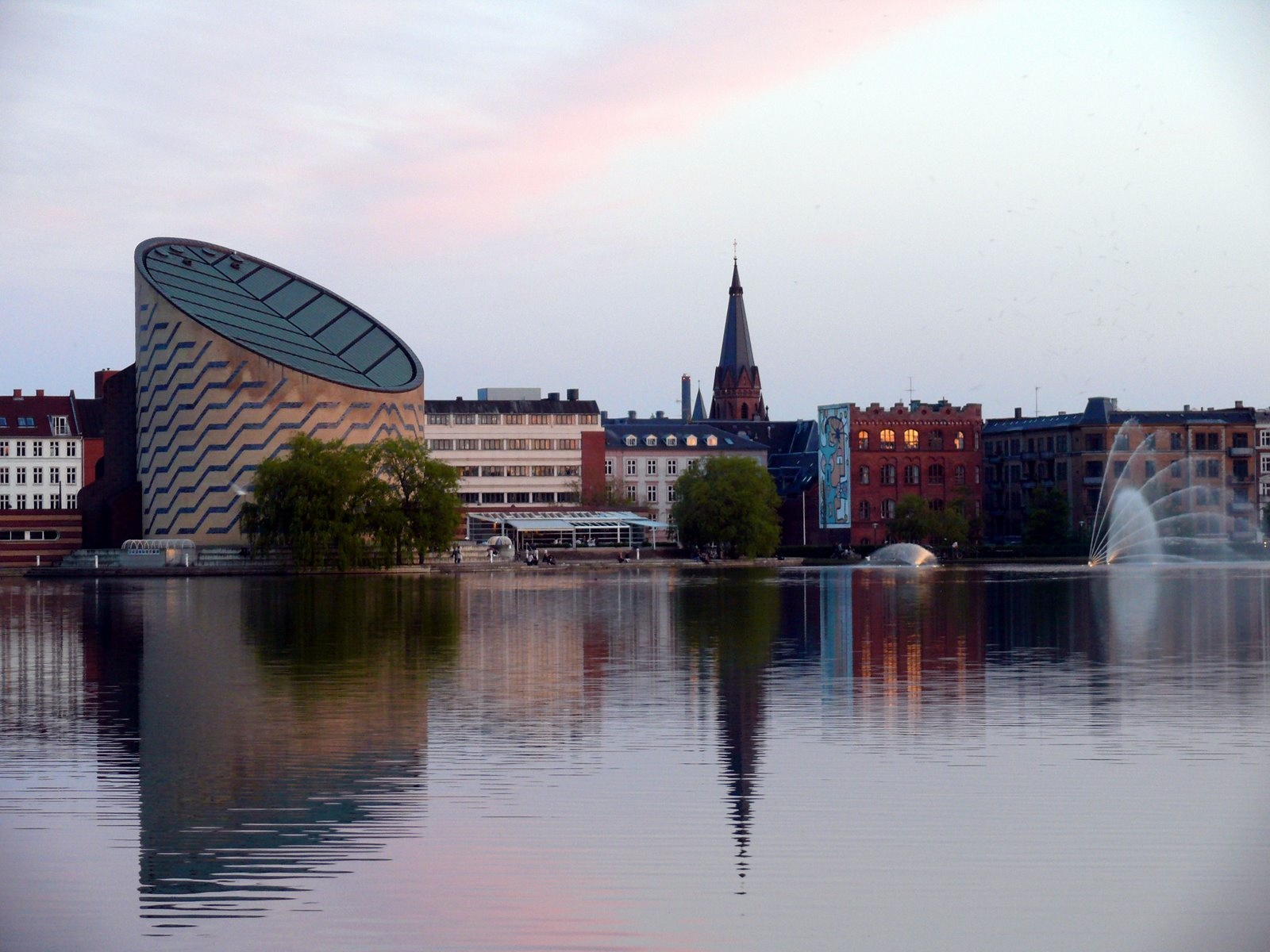
The beginning of the street at The Lakes

== See also ==
- Roskildevej
- H. C. Ørstedsvej
- Albert Nicolai Schioldann
