= Institut Sankt Joseph Copenhagen =

Private Catholic school in Copenhagen, Denmark

Coordinates: 55.6942°N 12.5819°E

- Motto: "It is humanity's task to become human." - Cicero
- Established: 1858
- Type: Private
- Headmaster: Peter Franklin Jensen
- Founder: The Sankt Joseph Sisters of Denmark
- Students: 525 (approx.)
- Grades: Kindergarten - 9th Grade
- Location: Copenhagen, Denmark
- Campus: All school buildings are located in the Østerbro district of Copenhagen.
- Website: sanktjoseph.dk/en

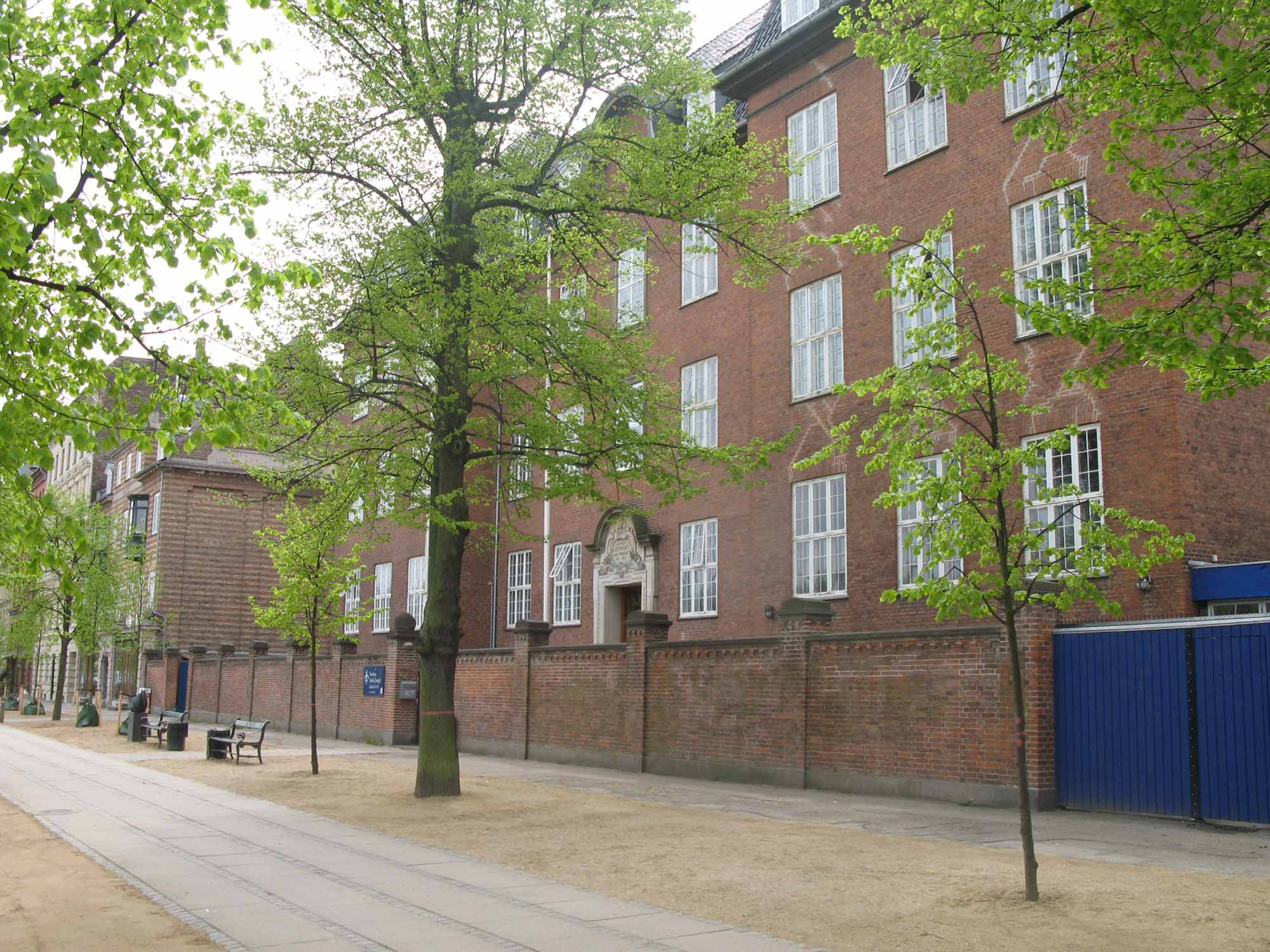
Main building seen from Dag Hammarskjölds Allé

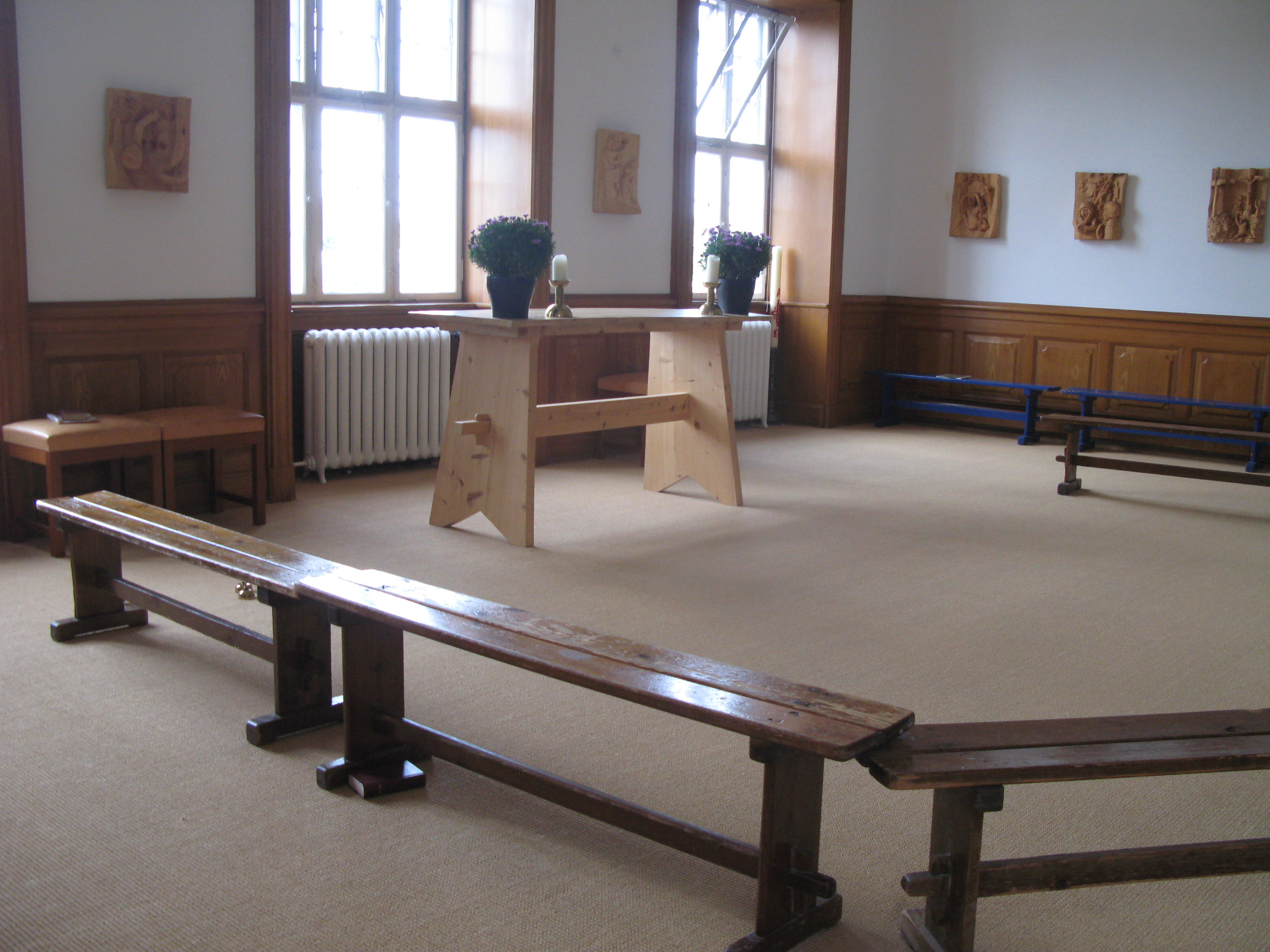
Annex

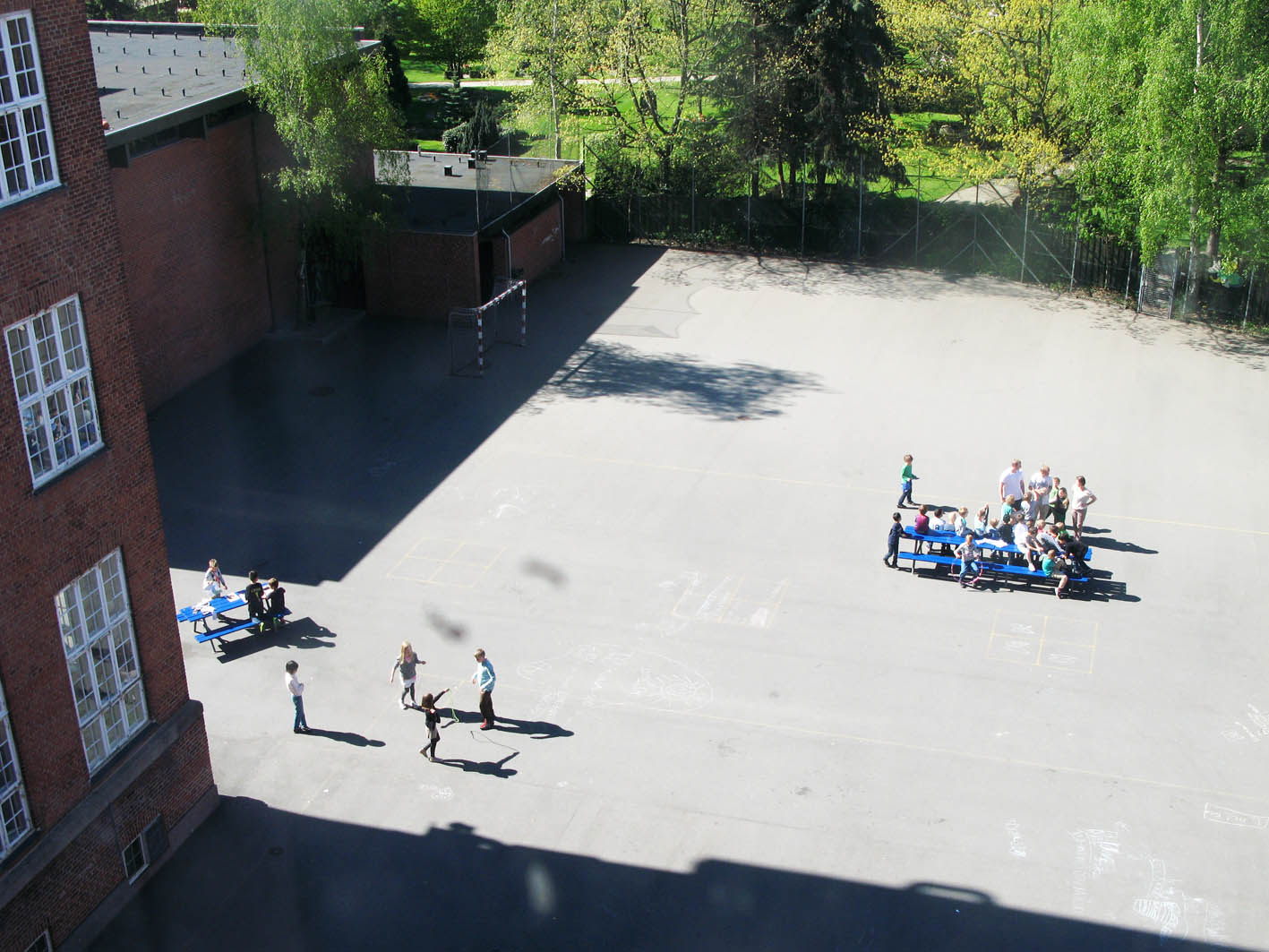
School yard

Institut Sankt Joseph Copenhagen is a private, Catholic school located in Copenhagen, Denmark. The self-governing institution's formation ideals and daily activities are rooted in the Catholic-humanistic views on life and man. The school's primary aim is to develop thoughtful and caring students who take their lives, opportunities and choices seriously.

The school's campus has a large main building with four floors, an annex building for kindergarten and after-school clubs, a theatre and a large gymnasium. The school is situated in the Østerbro section of Copenhagen, directly across from the United States Embassy and only minutes from the heart of the city and the coast.

== General Information ==
The school operates under a dual-track system, with a total of 22 classes, ranging from kindergarten through ninth grade. In 2012, there were approximately 525 students in total, with an average class size of 23.7 students. The primary subjects of instruction are as follows: Danish, English (from 1st grade), Mathematics, Musical Theory, Religious Studies, French, German, Physical Education, Biology, Chemistry, Physics, History, Computer Science, Natural History, Geography and Social Studies.

In addition, the school focuses on community service and giving back, with a mandatory service program for all eighth-grade students, a peer mentoring program and a summer service initiative.

Institut Sankt Joseph, as part of its international profile, takes part in EU funded projects, such as Comenius, and is actively seeking international partnerships with UNESCO and the U.N. as a means to furthering international cooperation and understanding. The school hosts a bi-annual event entitled: "Responsibility for fellow man and the world" in order to promote social justice, and raise funds for those less fortunate

Every ninth-grade class, immediately prior to the completion of their studies, has the opportunity to go on a teacher led retreat and discuss with their peers what they have learned, and where they are going now in life.

As of July 2013, The Institute of Saint Joseph will launch its inaugural summer program, focusing on language development, sports training, drama, theatre and community service projects in the local community.

== Philosophy ==
Institut Sankt Joseph, as a Catholic School, believes that a Catholic educational and formational project must be essentially understood as a humanities project, rooted in the long tradition of Catholic education. As the overall objective, whether it is at the end of the first day of kindergarten, or at the end of 9th grade, every child should be equipped to take on the task of what it is to be human; in short, to be themselves. To this effect, the school has formulated statements in regard to its views on humanity and formation ideals.

== Diversity ==
The student body is diverse both religiously and ethnically. Only 20% of the students are Catholic, whereas 80% are Protestant, Jewish, Muslim or have no religious affiliation. The school has a strong ecumenical profile, with activities such as the daily "morning song", where students of all beliefs come together in solidarity to start the day. In addition, there are many opportunities for the Catholic students at the school to stay engaged with their faith, such as the Wednesday "lunch mass" and feast day celebration masses celebrated with two Catholic priests affiliated with the school. In addition, students originate from 59 different countries and have 33 different mother tongues in total.

== Governance ==
As set out in the school's Bylaws, the Board of Directors oversee financial and administrative management of the school. The board consists of 5 members, appointed for a two-year term by the St. Joseph Sisters Order Society (Chairman), parents (two members), the Catholic bishop of Copenhagen (one member) and the Catholic Pastoral Council Executive in Denmark (one member), respectively. The day-to-day operations of the school are run by the principal.

The school has close ties to the P.T.A. and works hard to make sure that all parents, alumni, staff and leadership are working together to fulfill the mission of the school.
