= 2025 Guldborgsund municipal election =

Municipal election in Denmark

- 18 November 2025

All 29 seats to the Guldborgsund municipal council 15 seats needed for a majority
- Turnout: 33,733 (69.0%) ▲1.3%
	First party	Second party	Third party
	A	L	O
Party	Social Democrats	Guldborgsundlisten	Danish People's Party
Last election	9 seats, 28.9%	7 seats, 22.2%	6 seats, 19.0%
Seats won	8	7	3
Seat change	▼1	0	▼3
Popular vote	7,878	7,554	2,907
Percentage	23.9%	22.9%	8.8%
Swing	▼5.0%	▲0.7%	▼10.2%
	Fourth party	Fifth party	Sixth party
	F	Æ	V
Party	Green Left	Denmark Democrats	Venstre
Last election	1 seat, 4.7%	Did not stand	2 seats, 8.4%
Seats won	2	2	2
Seat change	▲1	▲2	0
Popular vote	2,666	2,342	2,289
Percentage	8.1%	7.1%	6.9%
Swing	▲3.4%	New	▼1.4%
	Seventh party	Eighth party	Ninth party
	C	M	I
Party	Conservatives	Moderates	Liberal Alliance
Last election	2 seats, 6.3%	Did not stand	Did not stand
Seats won	2	1	1
Seat change	0	▲1	▲1
Popular vote	1,820	1,343	1,312
Percentage	5.5%	4.1%	4.0%
Swing	▼0.7%	New	New
Mayor before election
Simon Hansen
Social Democrats
Mayor after election
Simon Hansen
Social Democrats

The 2025 Guldborgsund Municipal election was held on November 18, 2025, to elect the 29 members to sit in the regional council for the Guldborgsund Municipal council, in the period of 2026 to 2029. Simon Hansen from the Social Democrats, would secure re-election.

== Background ==
Following the 2021 election, Simon Hansen from Social Democrats became mayor for his first term, and overtook the position, which had been held by Guldborgsundlisten ever since the 2009 election. John Brædder would attempt to regain the position as mayor in this election, having won the candidacy for Guldborgsundlisten, the party that he himself started in 2001.

== Electoral system ==
For elections to Danish municipalities, a number varying from 9 to 31 are chosen to be elected to the municipal council. The seats are then allocated using the D'Hondt method and a closed list proportional representation. Guldborgsund Municipality had 29 seats in 2025.

== Electoral alliances ==
=== Electoral Alliance 1 ===
Party		Political alignment
A	Social Democrats	Centre-left
F	Green Left	Centre-left to Left-wing
Ø	Red-Green Alliance	Left-wing to Far-Left

=== Electoral Alliance 2 ===
Party		Political alignment
B	Social Liberals	Centre to Centre-left
L	Guldborgsundlisten	Local politics
M	Moderates	Centre to Centre-right

=== Electoral Alliance 3 ===
Party		Political alignment
C	Conservatives	Centre-right
I	Liberal Alliance	Centre-right to Right-wing
V	Venstre	Centre-right
Æ	Denmark Democrats	Right-wing to Far-right

=== Electoral Alliance 4 ===
Party		Political alignment
O	Danish People's Party	Right-wing to Far-right
T	Sydhavslisten	Local politics

== Results by polling station ==
Division	A	B	C	E	F	G	I	L	M	O	T	V	Z	Æ	Ø
Division	%	%	%	%	%	%	%	%	%	%	%	%	%	%	%
Nykøbing F. Hallen	24.1	1.7	6.1	0.0	11.4	0.8	5.5	24.7	3.6	8.0	2.2	4.4	0.0	3.4	3.8
Østerbro	27.6	1.7	5.0	0.1	11.0	1.1	5.2	21.4	4.4	8.3	2.0	4.6	0.0	3.1	4.3
Lindeskov	31.3	1.4	4.9	0.0	8.4	0.8	4.4	21.8	4.9	6.4	2.1	4.9	0.0	4.1	4.6
Ejegod	28.1	1.7	5.1	0.1	8.5	0.8	3.5	22.6	5.7	8.0	2.2	4.4	0.0	4.6	4.6
Kraghave	25.7	2.0	4.9	0.1	8.1	0.9	5.8	20.6	5.6	7.4	2.9	8.2	0.0	5.6	2.1
Toreby	18.1	1.6	4.3	0.3	8.2	2.8	5.6	25.1	2.2	8.9	2.6	6.7	0.0	10.1	3.6
Sundby	24.1	1.9	5.9	0.1	10.1	0.9	2.7	25.3	3.8	6.9	1.6	9.4	0.0	4.4	2.9
Nysted	19.1	2.9	2.8	0.1	8.1	1.2	3.3	29.5	3.5	6.7	2.3	10.8	0.0	6.8	2.9
Øster Ulslev	18.0	1.9	3.6	0.0	5.7	1.5	3.3	19.6	2.6	11.3	2.0	17.2	0.0	8.9	3.9
Nørre Alslev	20.7	1.0	5.7	0.3	6.4	2.3	3.1	18.6	3.1	11.3	1.8	14.1	0.0	7.2	3.6
Nørre Vedby	19.3	1.9	4.8	0.0	7.5	2.9	3.7	15.2	3.5	11.4	2.0	10.5	0.0	12.2	4.2
Eskilstrup	28.5	1.4	4.3	0.0	6.1	1.1	5.6	15.4	3.3	11.3	3.9	5.6	0.0	10.0	2.9
Sakskøbing	23.2	0.8	11.4	0.0	6.0	1.7	2.6	26.8	2.5	6.1	0.7	4.4	0.0	10.8	2.6
Majbølle	17.2	1.4	8.9	0.0	7.5	1.4	2.6	20.9	3.6	12.2	2.8	7.5	0.0	10.3	3.4
Våbensted	15.9	0.5	8.4	0.0	6.2	2.3	1.1	19.2	1.8	9.2	2.1	5.9	0.0	23.6	3.4
Stubbekøbing	26.5	1.2	3.2	0.5	7.3	1.3	1.6	27.8	2.3	10.8	1.4	4.1	0.0	6.9	4.3
Horreby	22.5	1.1	3.3	0.5	7.9	0.9	4.8	17.9	7.1	12.0	2.7	6.0	0.0	9.5	3.7
Idestrup	23.9	1.1	5.7	0.1	6.6	2.3	6.0	19.0	6.2	9.1	1.5	7.9	0.0	8.3	2.3
Væggerløse	21.8	0.9	5.0	0.0	6.8	0.5	4.4	28.2	5.9	8.4	2.7	6.7	0.0	6.4	2.1
Gedser	21.5	1.7	2.5	0.0	9.7	1.1	4.2	21.5	2.7	15.1	2.8	7.0	0.0	3.9	6.1

== Results ==
Party		Votes	%	+/-	Seats	+/-
Guldborgsund Municipality
A	Social Democrats	7,878	23.87	-5.00	8	-1
L	Guldborgsundlisten	7,554	22.89	+0.65	7	0
O	Danish People's Party	2,907	8.81	-10.21	3	-3
F	Green Left	2,666	8.08	+3.35	2	+1
Æ	Denmark Democrats	2,342	7.10	New	2	New
V	Venstre	2,289	6.93	-1.44	2	0
C	Conservatives	1,820	5.51	-0.75	2	0
M	Moderates	1,343	4.07	New	1	New
I	Liberal Alliance	1,312	3.97	New	1	New
Ø	Red-Green Alliance	1,157	3.51	-0.39	1	0
T	Sydhavslisten	699	2.12	New	0	New
B	Social Liberals	488	1.48	-0.30	0	0
G	Dit Guldborgsund	426	1.29	New	0	New
Z	Folkebevægelsen Danmark	85	0.26	New	0	New
E	Lars Erdmanns Liste	41	0.12	New	0	New
Total		33,007	100	N/A	29	N/A
Invalid votes		147	0.30	-0.10		
Blank votes		579	1.18	+0.08		
Turnout		33,733	68.96	+1.26		
Source: valg.dk

== Opinion polls ==
Polling firm	Fieldwork date	Sample size	A	L	O	V	C	F	Ø	B	E	G	I	M	T	Z	Æ	Others	Lead
Epinion	4 Sep - 13 Oct 2025	422	30.9	–	11.7	7.5	4.3	9.6	2.4	0.4	–	–	3.9	1.2	–	–	9.6	18.5	19.2
2024 european parliament election	9 Jun 2024		21.9	–	10.8	12.4	10.4	14.5	4.3	3.3	–	–	5.1	6.4	–	–	9.5	–	7.4
2022 general election	1 Nov 2022		36.2	–	8.8	10.1	3.9	8.1	3.0	1.3	–	–	4.5	9.2	–	–	8.8	–	26.1
2021 regional election	16 Nov 2021		44.8	–	10.2	13.0	7.4	4.8	4.1	2.1	–	–	0.7	–	–	–	–	–	31.8
2021 municipal election	16 Nov 2021		28.9 (9)	22.2 (7)	19.0 (6)	8.4 (2)	6.3 (2)	4.7 (1)	3.9 (1)	1.8 (0)	–	–	–	–	–	–	–	–	6.7
