= Frederiksberg Fire Station =

Fire station in Copenhagen, Denmark

Coordinates: 55°40′48″N 12°31′47″E

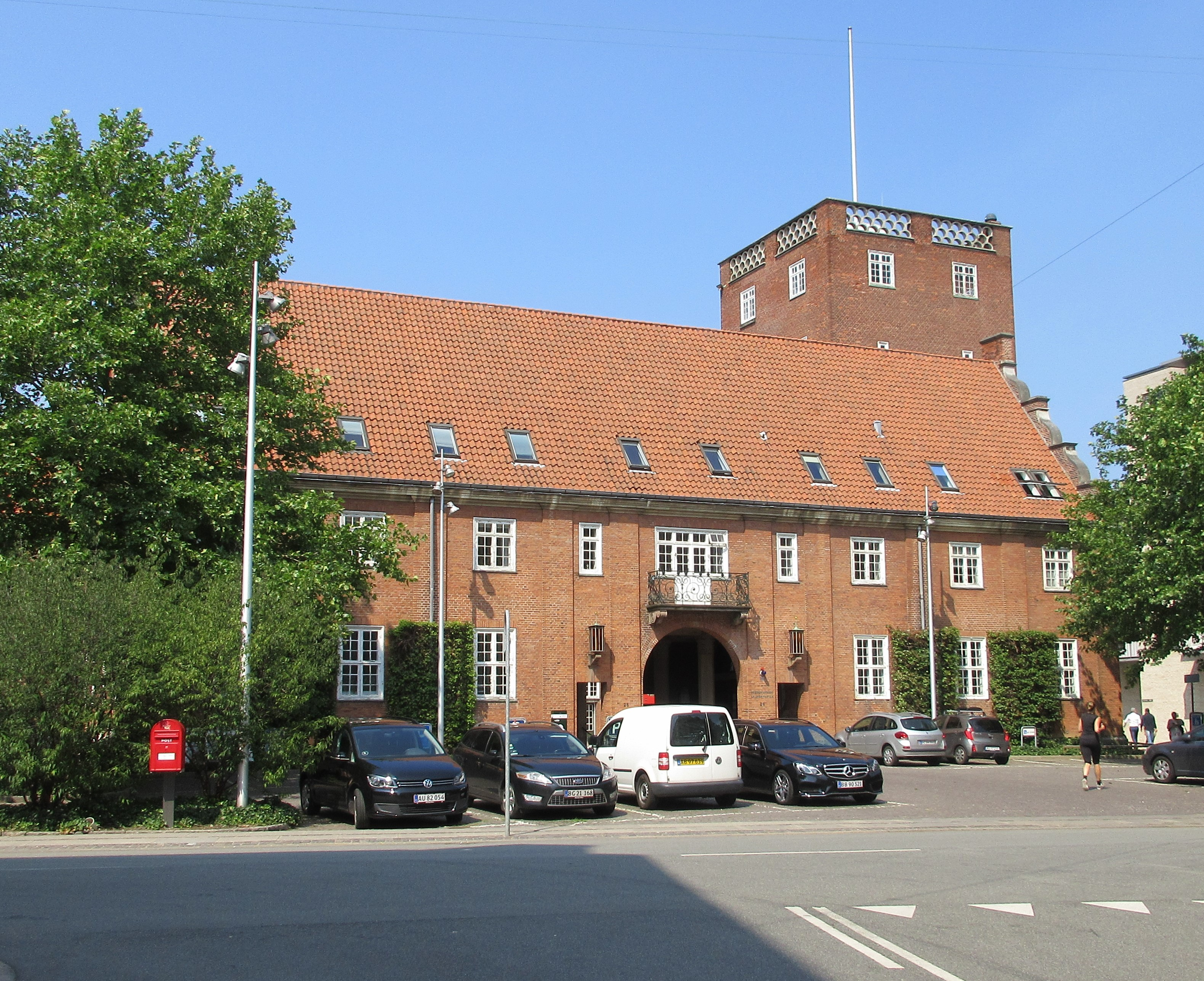
Frederiksberg Fire Station

Frederiksberg Fire Station (Danish: Frederiksberg Brandstation) is one of several local fire stations operated by Copenhagen Fire Department (Hovedstadens Beredskab) in the Greater Copenhagen area. It is located on Howitzvej in Frederiksberg. The building is part of a larger complex which also comprises Frederiksberg Courthouse, Solbjerg Church and the former Frederiksberg Police Station.

== History ==
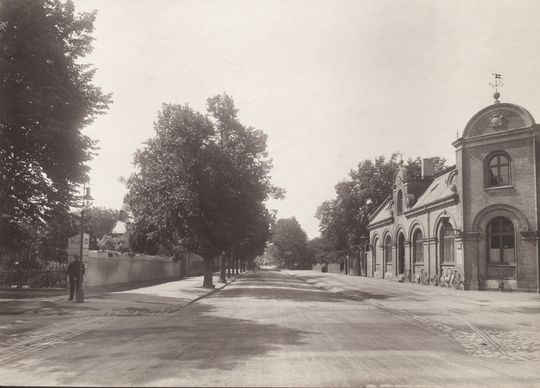
The first fire station at the corner of Pile Allé (No. 2) with Frederiksberg Runddel

The first horse-drawn fire pump in Frederiksberg was acquired in 1855. It was operated manually by volunteers from the area around Pile Allé. The rapid growth of Frederiksberg's population after Frederiksberg Municipality became independent in 1857 resulted in the need for a proper and better organized fire brigade emerged when Frederiksberg's population began to grow rapidly following Frederiksberg Municipality's independence in 1857. Frederiksberg Fire Brigade was founded in 1867 and a purpose-built fire station was inaugurated on the corner of Frederiksberg Runddel and Pile Allé (Pile Allé 2) the same year. The building now houses the Storm P. Museum. The staff consisted of 21 fire officers, 224 fire fighters, four messengers, 11 coaches and 22 horses.

In 1886 the fire station moved to a new building on Lampevej (now Howitzvej) No. 6. The new fire station was located to the rear of Frederiksberg's new town hall on the corner with Falkoner Allé. Many new technologies were also introduced in the 1880s and 1890s, reducing the typical response time to approximately 10 minutes. The first steam-powered fire engine was acquired in 1898. From 1905, Frederiksberg Fire Brigade also operated a horse-drawn ambulance. It was owned by the organisation "lægevagtsstationer" but the staff came from the fire brigade's ladder team. The horse-drawn vehicles were replaced by automobiles in 1911–1925. A 26-metre-tall (85 ft) electric tower ladder was acquired in 1911 to avoid having to park petrol-powered vehicles too close to fire scenes. The first smoke protection devices were introduced in 1914 when the fire brigade purchased six German oxygene masks intended for use in the mining industry.

In 1928, an employee from the fire department named Schrøder and an engineer named van Deurs invented a method and apparatus for production of mechanical foam. Their invention was first used by Frederiksberg Fire Brigade but they obtained a worldwide patent and it was later used internationally. The fire station became too small and an architectural competition for the design of a combined fire and police station at the abandoned site of Frederiksberg Hospital a little further down Howitzvej was launched inn 1914. It was won by Gack Kampmann. Due to the outbreak of World War I and the following economic crisis, the project was not completed until 1923. Frederiksberg Fire Brigade was merged with Copenhagen Fire Brigade under the name Hovedstadens Beredskab on 1 January 2016.

== Gallery ==
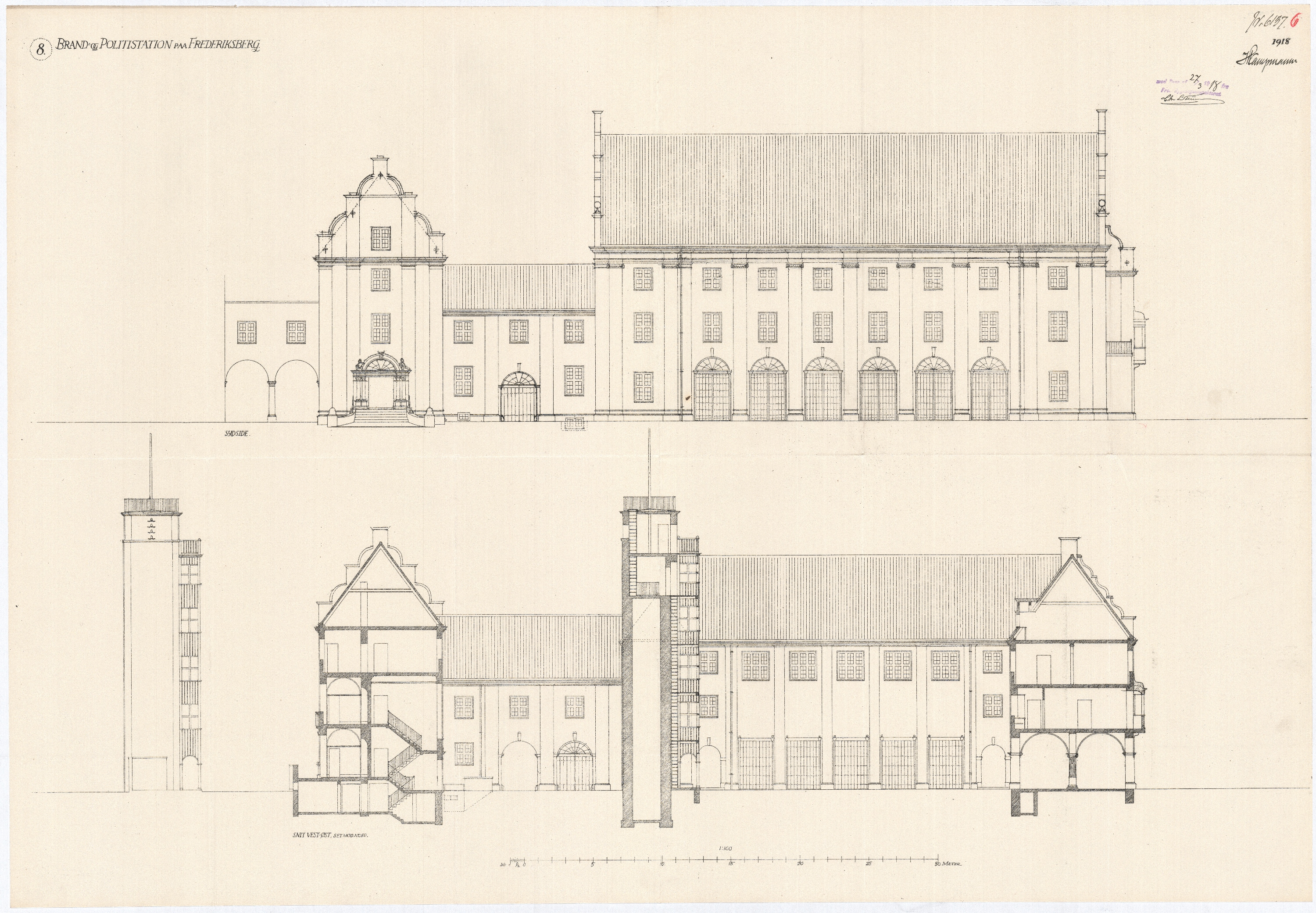
Rendering with front view. The police station is the narrow building to the left and the fire station is the larger building to the right

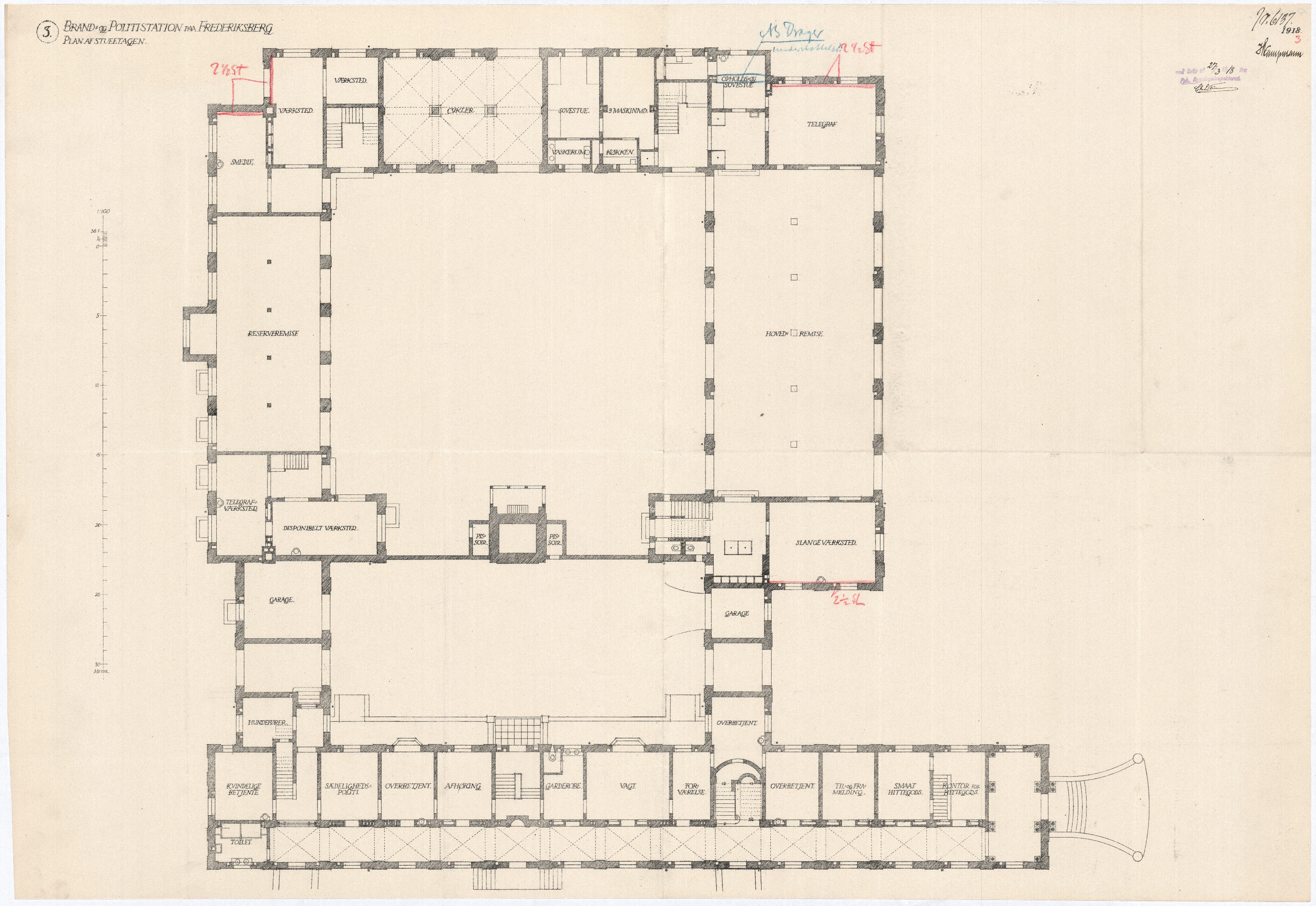
Floor plan of the complex
