= 2021 Guldborgsund municipal election =

← 2017	16 November 2021	2025 →

All 29 seats to the Guldborgsund Municipal Council 15 seats needed for a majority
- Turnout: 33,763 (69.7%) ▼4.2pp
	First party	Second party	Third party
	A	L	O
Party	Social Democrats	Guldborgsundlisten	Danish People's Party
Last election	6 seats, 20.6%	11 seats, 33.2%	7 seats, 23.8%
Seats won	9	7	6
Seat change	▲3	▼4	▼1
Popular vote	9,537	7,344	6,282
Percentage	28.9%	22.2%	19.0%
Swing	▲8.3%	▼11%	▼4.8%
	Fourth party	Fifth party	Sixth party
	V	C	F
Party	Venstre	Conservatives	Green Left
Last election	3 seats, 8.3%	0 seats, 2.4%	1 seat, 4.1%
Seats won	2	2	1
Seat change	▼1	▲2	0
Popular vote	2,765	2,069	1,560
Percentage	8.4%	6.3%	4.7%
Swing	▲0.1%	▲3.9%	▲0.6%
	Seventh party	Eighth party
	D	Ø
Party	New Right	Red–Green Alliance
Last election	0 seats, 0.9%	1 seat, 3,3%
Seats won	1	1
Seat change	▲1	0
Popular vote	1,391	1,288
Percentage	4.2%	3.9%
Swing	▲3.3%	▲0.6%
Mayor before election
John Brædder
Guldborgsundlisten
Mayor after election
Simon Hansen
Social Democrats

Ever since the 2007 municipal reform, and prior to this election, John Brædder from local party Guldborgsundlisten had been mayor of Guldborgsund Municipality. However it was only in the last election , that his party won the most seats.

For this election, Mandag Morgen, who had made an article predicting the 98 mayors that would follow the elections, gave John Brædder and his party good chances to continue.

However, the 'winners' of the election would be the Social Democrats, who managed to win 9 seats, 3 more than in 2017. On the other hand, Guldborgsundlisten lost 4 seats, and ended with 7 seats. The third biggest party would become Danish People's Party, who won 6 seats, and 19.0% of the vote, the highest in any of the 98 municipal elections in 2017. Both the blocs had won 11 seats, so the 7 seats of Guldborgsundlisten still had a chance to come into play. However, Danish People's Party ended up going together with the red bloc, and Simon Hansen could become the first mayor from a non-local party in the history (Note: counting from the 2007 municipal reform) of the municipality.

== Electoral system ==
For elections to Danish municipalities, a number varying from 9 to 31 are chosen to be elected to the municipal council. The seats are then allocated using the D'Hondt method and a closed list proportional representation. Guldborgsund Municipality had 29 seats in 2021

Unlike in Danish General Elections, in elections to municipal councils, electoral alliances are allowed.

== Electoral alliances ==
=== Electoral Alliance 1 ===
Party		Political alignment
B	Social Liberals	Centre to Centre-left
K	Christian Democrats	Centre to Centre-right

=== Electoral Alliance 2 ===
Party		Political alignment
F	Green Left	Centre-left to Left-wing
Ø	Red–Green Alliance	Left-wing to Far-Left

=== Electoral Alliance 3 ===
Party		Political alignment
L	Guldborgsundlisten	Local politics
V	Venstre	Centre-right
Å	The Alternative	Centre-left to Left-wing

== Results by polling station ==
Division	A	B	C	D	F	K	L	O	V	Ø	Å
Division	%	%	%	%	%	%	%	%	%	%	%
Byen	26.6	2.8	6.3	4.0	6.7	0.2	27.0	13.8	6.5	5.8	0.2
Østerbro	27.2	2.8	5.8	3.6	6.1	0.4	23.7	18.5	6.7	4.9	0.3
Lindeskov	32.9	1.9	5.9	2.9	5.3	0.8	22.8	16.9	5.6	4.6	0.4
Ejegod	29.6	1.7	6.4	3.4	4.0	0.2	23.8	18.6	7.1	4.9	0.2
Nysted	28.3	1.8	4.6	3.9	4.3	0.1	24.8	16.3	11.0	4.3	0.7
Sundby	28.8	2.1	7.3	3.0	5.3	0.3	24.4	17.8	7.6	3.2	0.0
Toreby	25.0	1.6	7.5	4.4	4.4	0.1	22.8	20.1	10.9	3.1	0.1
Kraghave	26.8	1.7	5.6	6.0	5.4	0.3	23.5	19.2	8.3	3.1	0.3
Eskilstrup	35.8	2.4	4.2	5.9	3.4	0.0	15.1	22.2	8.7	2.1	0.3
Nørre Vedby	29.9	2.0	5.0	4.9	4.2	0.3	16.9	19.3	13.1	3.7	0.7
Nørre Alslev	28.1	1.4	5.4	4.2	3.6	0.4	18.8	20.6	12.9	4.1	0.5
Øster Ulslev	25.3	0.8	4.6	6.3	3.9	0.1	17.4	19.0	17.4	4.2	1.0
Sakskøbing	33.3	1.4	9.2	3.1	4.3	0.1	21.3	16.7	7.2	3.1	0.3
Majbølle	25.9	1.2	9.1	6.1	3.4	0.1	16.4	21.7	11.1	4.6	0.2
Våbensted	25.1	0.5	10.0	5.4	5.1	0.0	21.2	18.7	11.0	2.8	0.2
Stubbekøbing	31.2	1.1	4.3	4.8	5.2	0.7	23.2	16.8	7.9	4.3	0.6
Gedser	25.2	0.7	4.1	4.9	4.9	0.1	24.6	25.2	2.6	6.6	1.1
Væggerløse	27.3	1.7	8.6	3.7	4.2	0.1	22.9	23.1	5.9	2.0	0.5
Idestrup	25.9	1.3	5.1	5.1	3.8	0.3	22.5	24.0	9.3	2.5	0.2
Horreby	27.0	1.8	4.2	4.8	4.6	0.1	21.0	24.0	8.2	3.9	0.2

== Results ==
Party		Votes	%	+/-	Seats	+/-
Guldborgsund Municipality
A	Social Democrats	9,537	28.87	+8.22	9	+3
L	Guldborgsundlisten	7,344	22.23	-10.91	7	-4
O	Danish People's Party	6,282	19.02	-4.83	6	-1
V	Venstre	2,765	8.37	+0.06	2	-1
C	Conservatives	2,069	6.26	+3.82	2	+2
F	Green Left	1,560	4.72	+0.61	1	0
D	New Right	1,391	4.21	+3.29	1	+1
Ø	Red-Green Alliance	1,288	3.90	+0.60	1	0
B	Social Liberals	588	1.78	+0.49	0	0
Å	The Alternative	118	0.36	-0.77	0	0
K	Christian Democrats	91	0.28	-0.04	0	0
Total		33,033	100	N/A	29	N/A
Invalid votes		200	0.40	+0.05		
Blank votes		530	1.06	+0.27		
Turnout		33,763	67.69	-4.42		
Source: valg.dk
