= Copenhagen Fire Department =

Fire department in Copenhagen, Denmark

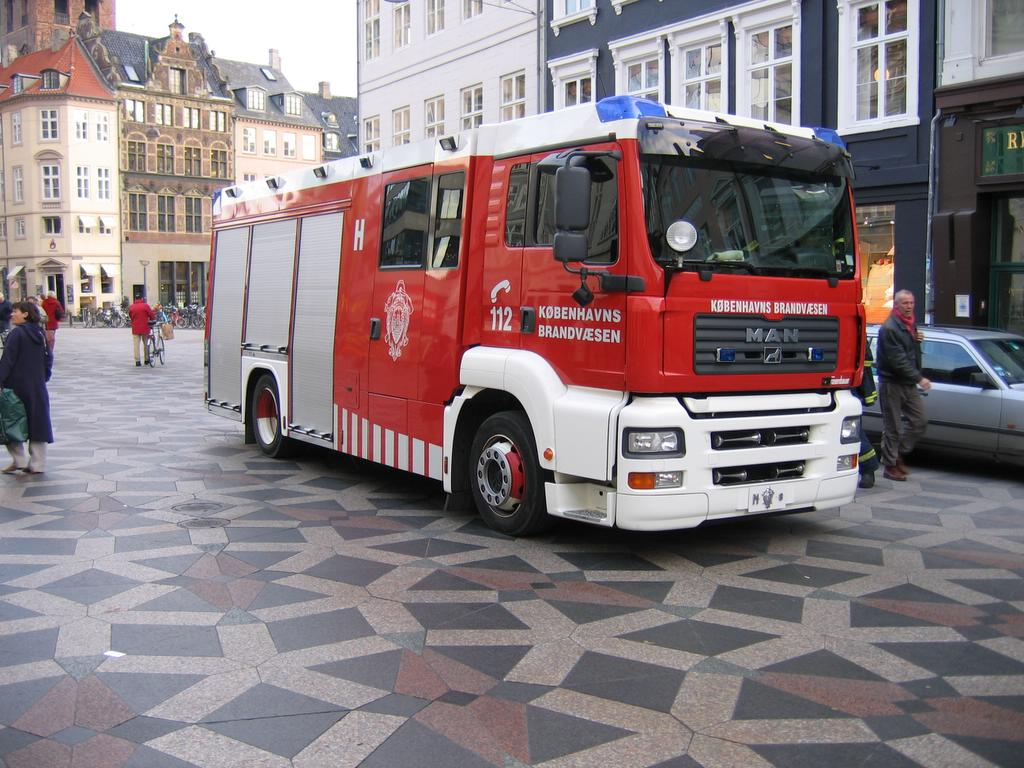
A Copenhagen fire engine

The Greater Copenhagen Fire Department (Danish: Hovedstadens Beredskab, formerly Københavns Brandvæsen) forms the largest municipal fire brigade in Denmark with more than 1,000 employees. This includes firefighters, ambulance personnel, administration and service workers and workers in fire prevention.

The Central Fire Station is home to several other organisations, such as Danske Beredskaber (the National Fire Chiefs Association) and Unge i Beredskabet a national youth fire organisation. Beredskabsforbundet was also planned to move in, but this is yet to be put in effect.

== History ==
The brigade began as the Copenhagen Royal Fire Brigade (Københavns kongelige Brandvæsen) on 9 July 1687 under King Christian V. After the passing of the Copenhagen Fire Act on 18 May 1868, on 1 August 1870 the Copenhagen Fire Brigade became a municipal institution in its own right. In 1898, its responsibilities were extended to include the Ambulance Service. The Helmeted Firemen Service was inaugurated in 1930 and the Civil Contingency Planning Department in 1998. The fire department has its headquarters in the Copenhagen Central Fire Station located behind the City Hall. Designed by Ludvig Fenger in the Historicist style, it was inaugurated in 1892.

On April 28, 2013 suspected arsonist fire ripped through the Museum of Danish Resistance in Copenhagen. Firefighters arrived within minutes of the alarm and quickly determined, that the old, largely wooden structure couldn't be saved, so the fire fighters were split into groups either stalling the blaze or emptying the museum for its historical artefacts from World War II. The department managed to clear close to all the artifacts, thereby rescuing the heritage of the Danish resistance movement during the Nazi occupation of Denmark almost in its entirety. For this action, the Danish National Museum in 2014 awarded the Copenhagen Fire Department its jubilee medal for invaluable service.

== Fire stations ==
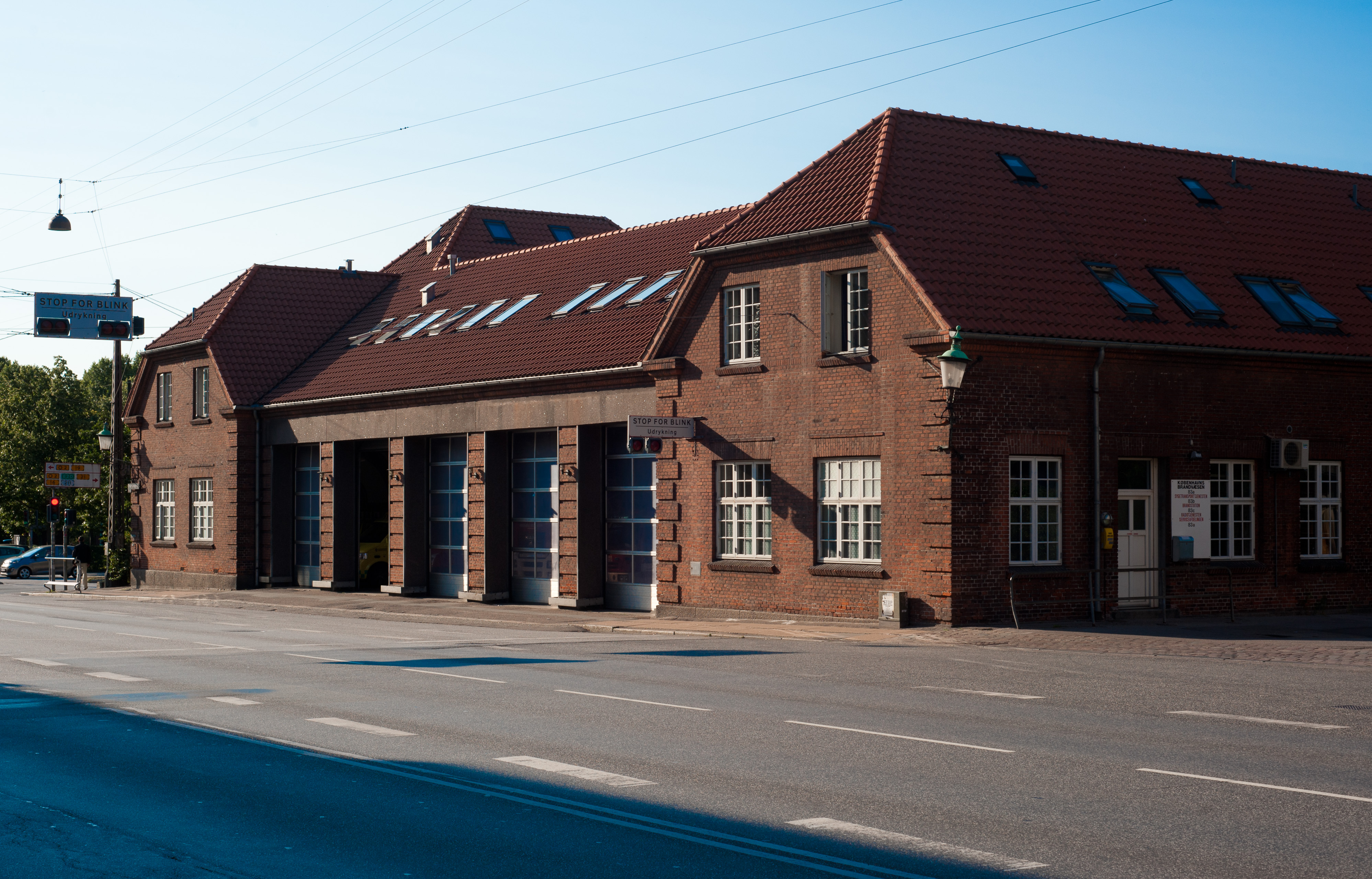
Tomsgården Fire Station

=== Copenhagen Central Fire Station ===
Copenhagen Central Fire Station (Københavns Hovedbrandstation) is located to the back of Copenhagen City Hall.

=== Christianshavn Fire Station ===
Christianshavn Fire Station (Christianshavn Brandstation) is located at Markmandsgade 15 in Christianshavn.

=== Frederiksberg Fire Station ===
Frederiksberg Fire Station (Frederiksberg Brandstation) is located on Howitzvej (No. 26( in Frederiksberg. The building is part of a complex which also comprises Solbjerg Church and Frederiksberg Courthouse.

=== Fælledvej Fire Station ===
Fælledvej Fire Station (Fælledvej Brandstation) is located on Fælledvej (No. 20 A( in Nørrebro.

=== Østerbro Fire Station ===
Østerbro Fire Station (Østerbro Brandstation) is located on Østbanegade (No. 89) in Østerbro.

=== Vesterbro Fire Station ===
Vesterbro Fire Station (Vesterbro Brandstation) is located on Enghavevej (Bo. 168-170) in Kongens Enghave.

=== Tomsgården Fire Station ===
Tomsgården Fire Station (Tomsgården Brandstation) is located at Frederikssundsvej 83 B in Bispebjerg.

=== Glostrup Fire Station ===
Glostrup Fire station (Glostrup Brandstation) is located at Bryggergårdsvej 3 in Glostrup.

=== Hvidovre Fire Station ===
Hvidovre Fire Station (Hvidovre Brandstation) is located at Avedøre Havnevej 37 in Hvidovre.

=== Gearhallen Dispatch ===
Gearhallen Dispatch (Gearhallen Alarm- og vagtcentral) is located at Gearhalsvej 1 in Valby.

=== Dragør Fire Station ===
Dragør Fire Station (Dragør Brandstation) is located at Nyby 4 in Dragør.

=== Store Magleby Fire Station ===
Store Magleby Fire Station (Store Magleby Brandstation) is located at Kirkevej 9 in Dragør.
