= Edith Brenneche Petersen =

Danish Lutheran priest (1896–1973)

Edith Marie Brenneche Petersen (1896–1973) was a Danish Lutheran priest, one of the first three women to be ordained into the Church of Denmark. As a result of legislation introduced by the Church Minister Carl Hermansen in 1947, the following year, together with Johanne Andersen and Ruth Vermehren, she was ordained by Bishop Hans Øllgaard in Odense Cathedral. Denmark thus became the first country in the world to have women priests. In 1948, she was appointed assistant priest in Nørre Åby-Indslev parish on the island of Funen where she quickly gained popularity. In 1951 she moved to Fredens Kirke in Odense.

== Biography ==
Born on 2 February 1896 in Copenhagen, Edith Marie Brenneche Petersen was the daughter of the manufacturer Heinrich Theodor Petersen (born 1864) and Ida Olivia Victoria Brenneche (born 1874). After matriculating from Vedels Kursus in 1917, she studied theology the University of Copenhagen, graduating in 1927. She had hoped to become a priest but as it was not yet possible, she took on work in offices and libraries and as a teacher. She was also an active member of the Solbjerg parish council in the Frederiksberg district of Copenhagen.

It was only in 1947 that legislation was adopted in the Folketing allowing women to be ordained as priests. In April 1948, together with Johanne Andersen and Ruth Vermehren she was ordained by the bishop of Odense. She had already been contacted by the parish council of Nørre Aaby where she was now appointed assistant priest. Despite a background in the Danish Inner Mission, she quickly adapted to the Grundtvigian conditions in Nørre Aaby.

As the post of assistant priest was a temporary assignment, she began to look for other employment. In 1951, she succeeded in being invited to take up the post of chaplain at Fredens Church in Odense. Despite achieving considerable success in her new position, in the late 1950s she had an accident which caused her health to deteriorate. This led to her retirement in 1961.

Edith Brenneche Petersen died in Odense on 8 September 1973. She is buried in Odense's Rising Cemetery.
