= Copenhagen Central Fire Station =

Building in Copenhagen, Denmark

Coordinates: 55.6744°N 12.5719°E

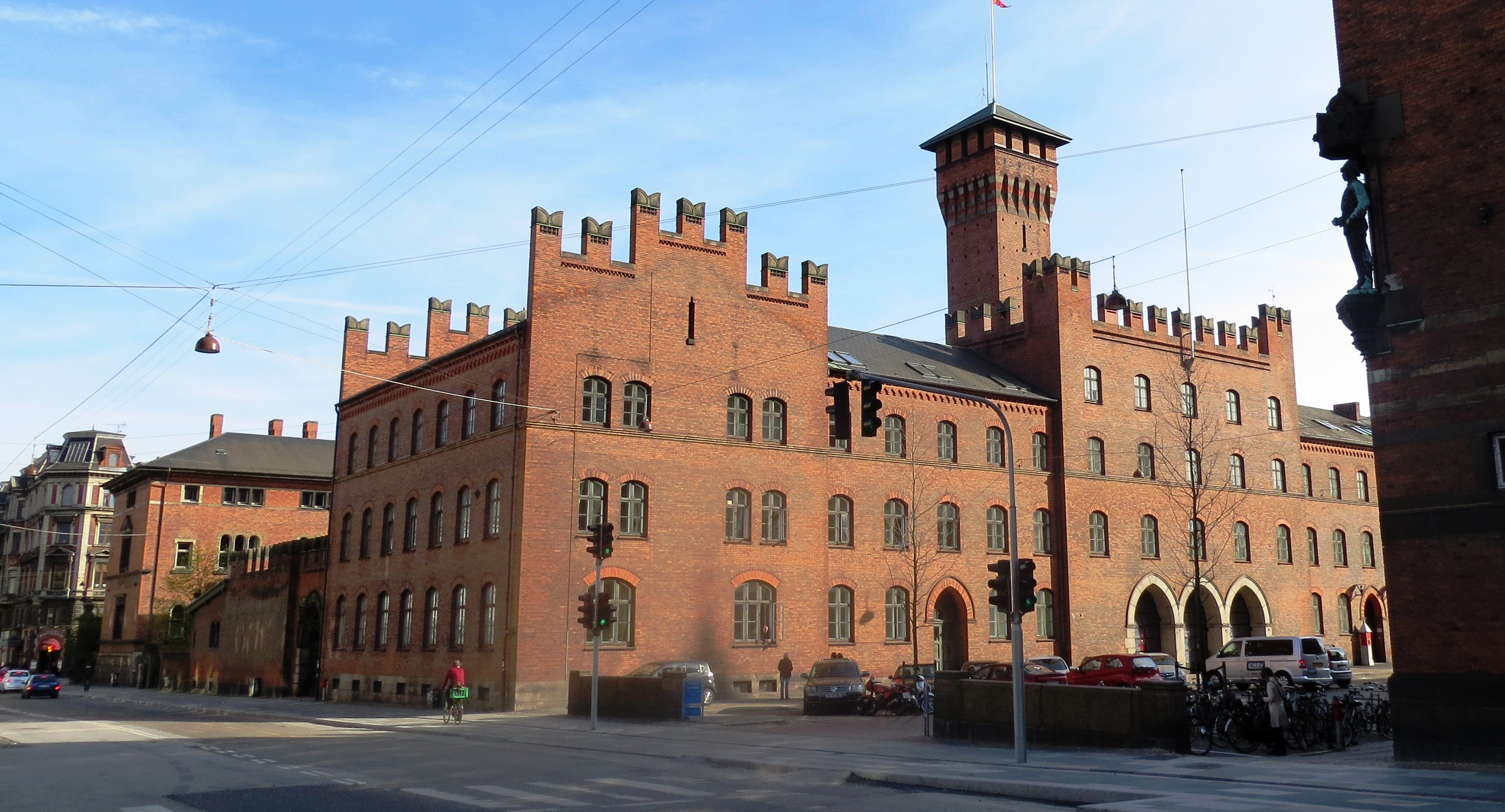
- Interactive map of the Copenhagen Central Fire Station area

General information
- Architectural style: Historicism
- Location: Copenhagen, Denmark
- Construction started: 1889
- Completed: 30 April 1892
- Client: Copenhagen Fire Department

Design and construction
- Architect: Ludvig Fenger

Copenhagen Central Fire Station (Danish: Københavns Hovedbrandstation) is the headquarters of Copenhagen Fire Department and located on H.C. Andersens Boulevard just behind Copenhagen City Hall and opposite Tivoli Gardens. It was designed by Ludvig Fenger and inaugurated in 1892.

== History ==
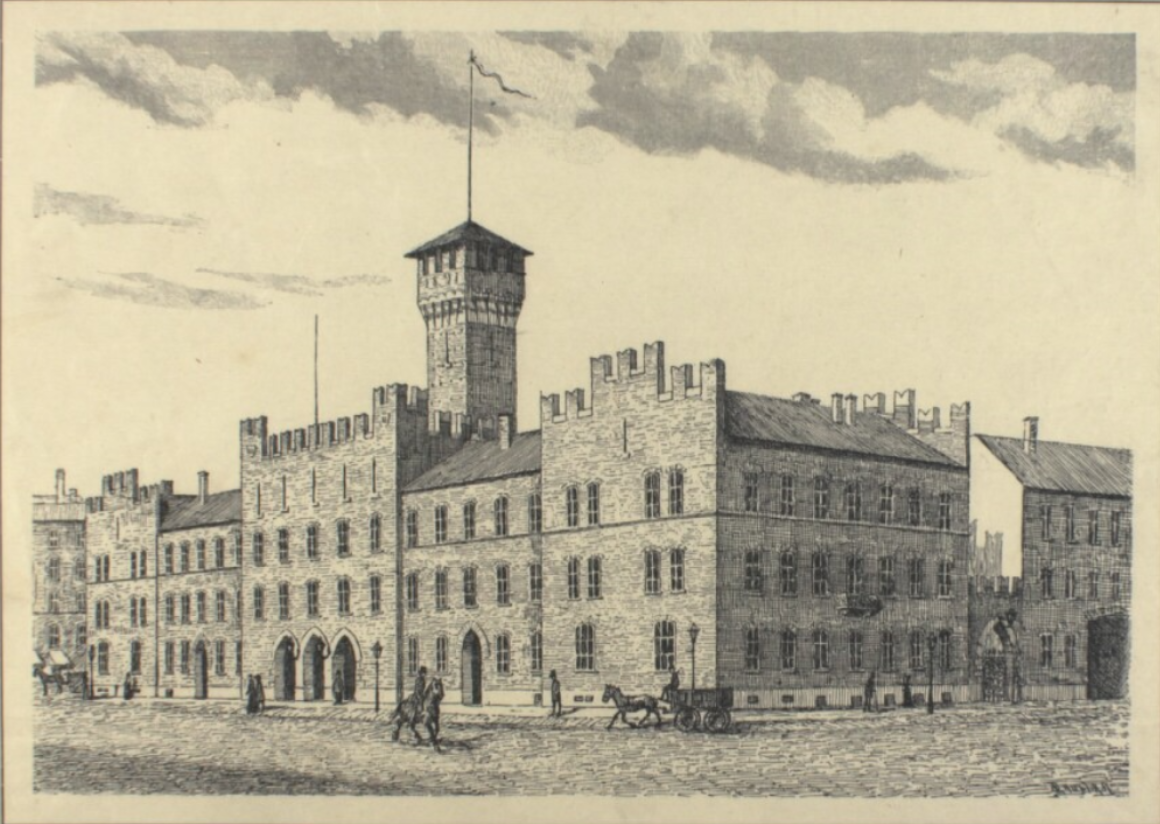
The building in 1891

Copenhagen had its first fire department on 9 July 1687 when King Christian V founded the Royal Copenhagen Fire Department. With the adoption of the Copenhagen Fire Act on 18 May 1868, the Copenhagen Fire Department was established as a municipal institution as of 1 August 1870.

In the middle of the 19th century, the fire station in the former St. Nicolai's Church had become outdated. It was therefore decided to construct a new purpose-built central fire station on the former grounds of the city's Western Rampart. The Bastioned Fortifications until now enclosing Copenhagen had recently been disbanded and the vacant land was now used for a number of large public building projects.

The recently instituted post of City Architect held by Ludvig Fenger was put in charge of the project.

Construction began in 1889 and the new Central Fire Station was inaugurated on 30 April 1892. At that time, the City Hall had still not been built and the new premises therefore had an unhindered view of the haymarket which was located where the City Hall Square is today. The tower of the building was also used in training with life nets and use of tall fire ladders.

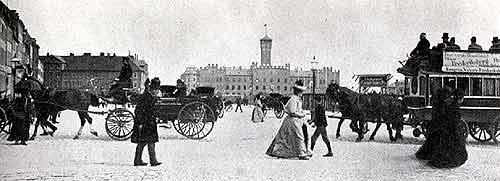
The Central Fire Station in 1893

== Architecture ==
The Central Fire Station is built to a Historicist design. With its crenellated gables, ogival gates and tower, the main source of inspiration is Medieval North Italian castle architecture.

== Copenhagen Central Fire Station today ==
The fire station houses the alarm central for the entire Greater Copenhagen area. It also contains most of the administrative functions of the Copenhagen Fire Department. The station's reaction district covers central Copenhagen as defined by the Inner Harbour, Dannebrogsgade, Vester Søgade, Gothersgade, Store Kongensgade and Esplanaden. The Copenhagen Fire Department operates six additional other fire stations within the municipality.

== See also ==
- Architecture of Denmark
