= Johanne Andersen =

Danish Lutheran priest

Johanne Hermansen Andersen (1913–1999) was a Danish Lutheran priest, one of the first three women to be ordained into the Church of Denmark. As a result of legislation introduced by the Church Minister Carl Hermansen in 1947, the following year, together with Edith Brenneche Petersen and Ruth Vermehren, she was ordained by Bishop Hans Øllgaard in Odense Cathedral. Denmark thus became the first country in the world to have women priests. Andersen was the first woman in Denmark to serve as a parish priest. In 1948, she was appointed parish priest in Nørre Ørslev on the island of Falster and later moving to Vigerslev Church in Copenhagen. In 1965, she became the parish priest of the newly established Margarethe Church, also in Copenhagen.

== Biography ==
Born on 11 September, 1913, in Virket on the island of Falster, Johanne Hermansen Andersen was the daughter of the estate owner Lars Peter Andersen (1871–1945) and Anna Hermansen (1875–1963). While still young, she spent a winter at Askov Højskole, a Grundtvigian folk high school. Keen to study, she matriculated from the Copenhagen school Akademisk Studenterkursus, enabling her to read theology at the University of Copenhagen. Even as a student, she began to call for changes in the law which would authorize the ordination of women as priests.

A member of the Danish Women's Society, she wrote an article in the organization's magazine Kvinden og Samfundet urging women to become members of parish councils in order to press for the admission of women priests. On graduating in theology in 1945, she continued her studies the following year at Uppsala University in Sweden where she embarked on church history. While teaching at Askovs Højskole in the summer of 1946, she was invited to become the priest at Nørre Ørslev Church where she had recently preached. Realizing that the existing parish priest Mads Peter Schmidt was nearing retirement age, in October 1946 the parochial council decreed that Andersen should become their parish priest. She was appointed to serve as Schmidt's assistant in 1947.

As a result of continuing political pressure from the Nørre Ørslev parochial council, the Rigsdag adopted legislation allowing women to become priests. In 1948, the bishop of Funen, Hans Øllgaard, ordained Andersen together with Edith Brenneche Petersen and Ruth Vermehren, making them the first three women to become Church of Denmark priests. The same year, Johanne Andersen was therefore officially appointed to the post of parish priest in Nørre Ørslev.

Despite strong initial opposition to her ordination, Andersen became a committed member of the local branch of the Kirkeligt Samfund (church association), chairing it from 1952. In 1957, she was engaged by the much larger Vigerslev Church in Copenhagen. Her energetic efforts towards the establishment of a new church to serve the district culminated in 1965 with the opening of Margrathe Church where she was appointed parish priest.

On retiring in 1975, she moved back to her native Falster. Johanne Andersen died in Nykøbing Falster on 30 September 1999.
