= Howitzvej =

Street in Frederiksberg Municipality, Denmark

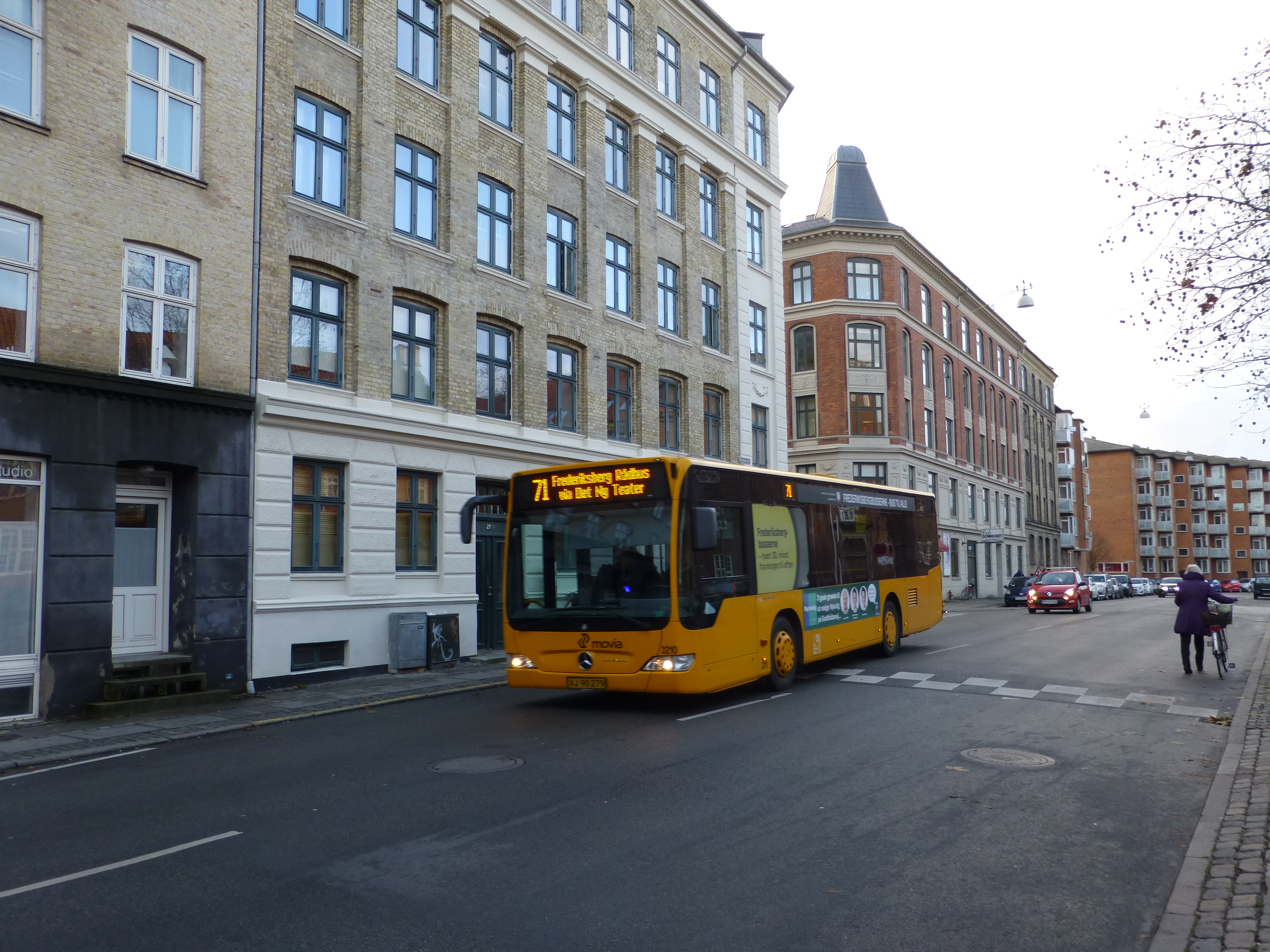
- Howitzvej factory
- Length: 745 m (2,444 ft)
- Location: Frederiksberg
- Postal code: 2000
- Coordinates: 55°40′48″N 12°31′38.28″E

Howitzvej is a street in Frederiksberg, a municipality surrounded by Copenhagen, Denmark. It runs from Falkoner Allé in the east to Nordre Fasanvej where it turns into Finsensvej before the name changes again to Jernbane Allé on the border with Vanløse.

== History ==
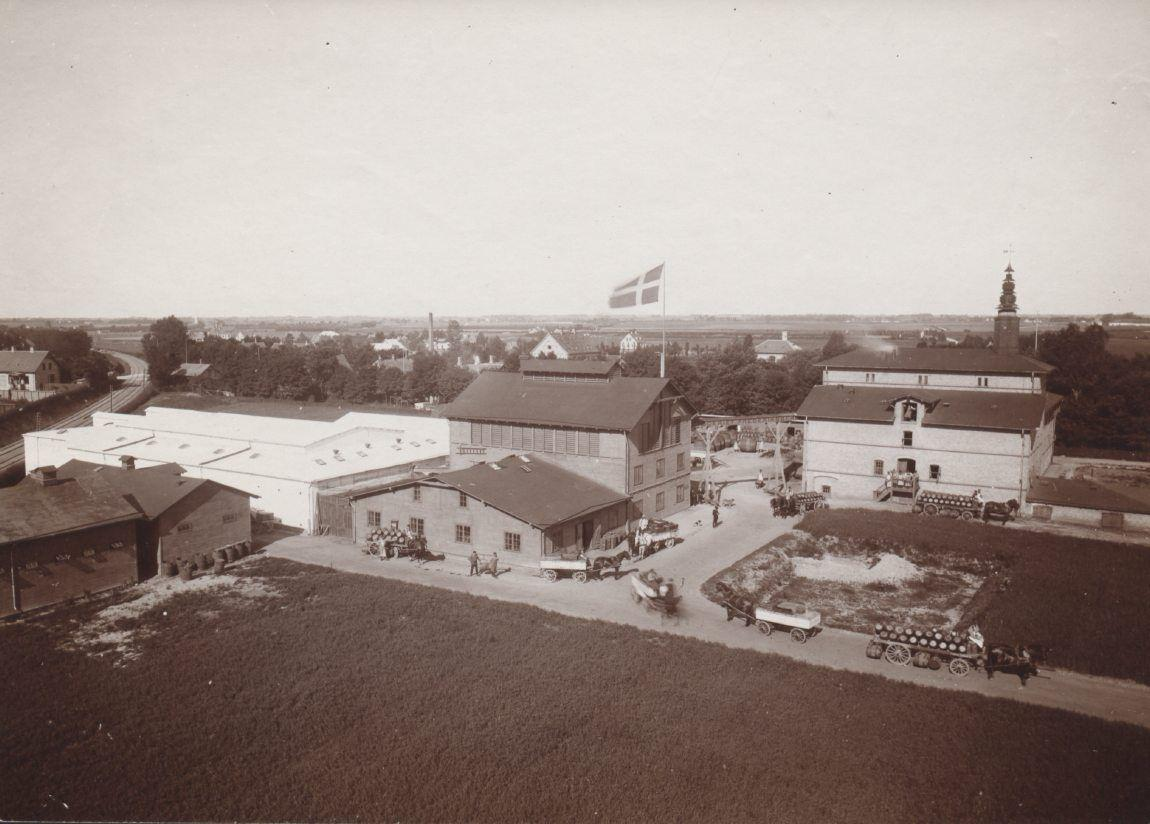
Frederiksberg Brewery on Lampevej

Howitzvej and its continuation Finsensvej was established in about 1755 and was first referred to as"The Road to the Numbers" (Vejen til numrene) with a reference to a series of numbered lots. The road became known as Lampevej (Lamp Road) from about 1860. The new name referred to one of the first outdoor street lamps in Copenhagen which was situated outside a midwife's practice to make it easier for customers to find their way ind the dark. The railway to Roskilde crossed Lampevej at Nordre Fasanvej from 1864 when Copenhagen Central Station was moved to a new location. The road received its current name on 1 January 1906 to avoid identification with the Lampevej Murder, an infamous murder which had taken place at the site in 1889.

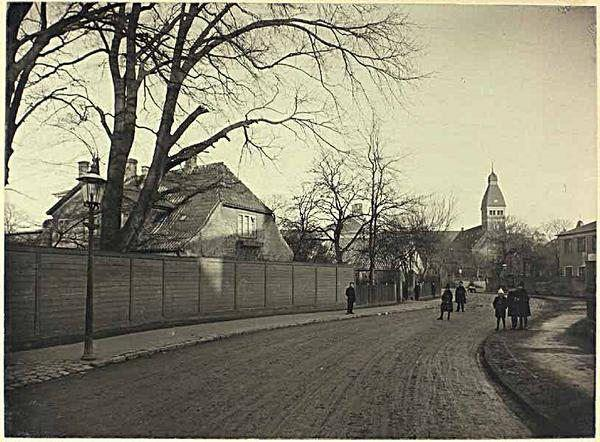
Howitzvej in c. 1910, looking easts

The first Frederiksberg Hospital (then Frederiksberg Sogns Sygehus) opened on the south side of the road in 1863. August Neubert moved his cotton mill from Schlesvig to Lampevej in 1864. The railway crossing disappeared when the central station moved to its current location. Frederiksberg Hospital moved to its new site at Nordre Fasanvej in 1903. A small portion of its old site was given to Frederiksbjerg Fødehjem m a birth clinic for indigent women from Frederiksberg and Valby created at the initiative of Frantz Howitz. Vibe-Hastrups chemical factory was completed at Howitzvej 53 in 1910 to design by Ejnar Thuren. The radio factory To-R Radio was located at No. 11-13 from 1933 until 1947 when it moved to Vanløse.

== Notable buildings and residents ==
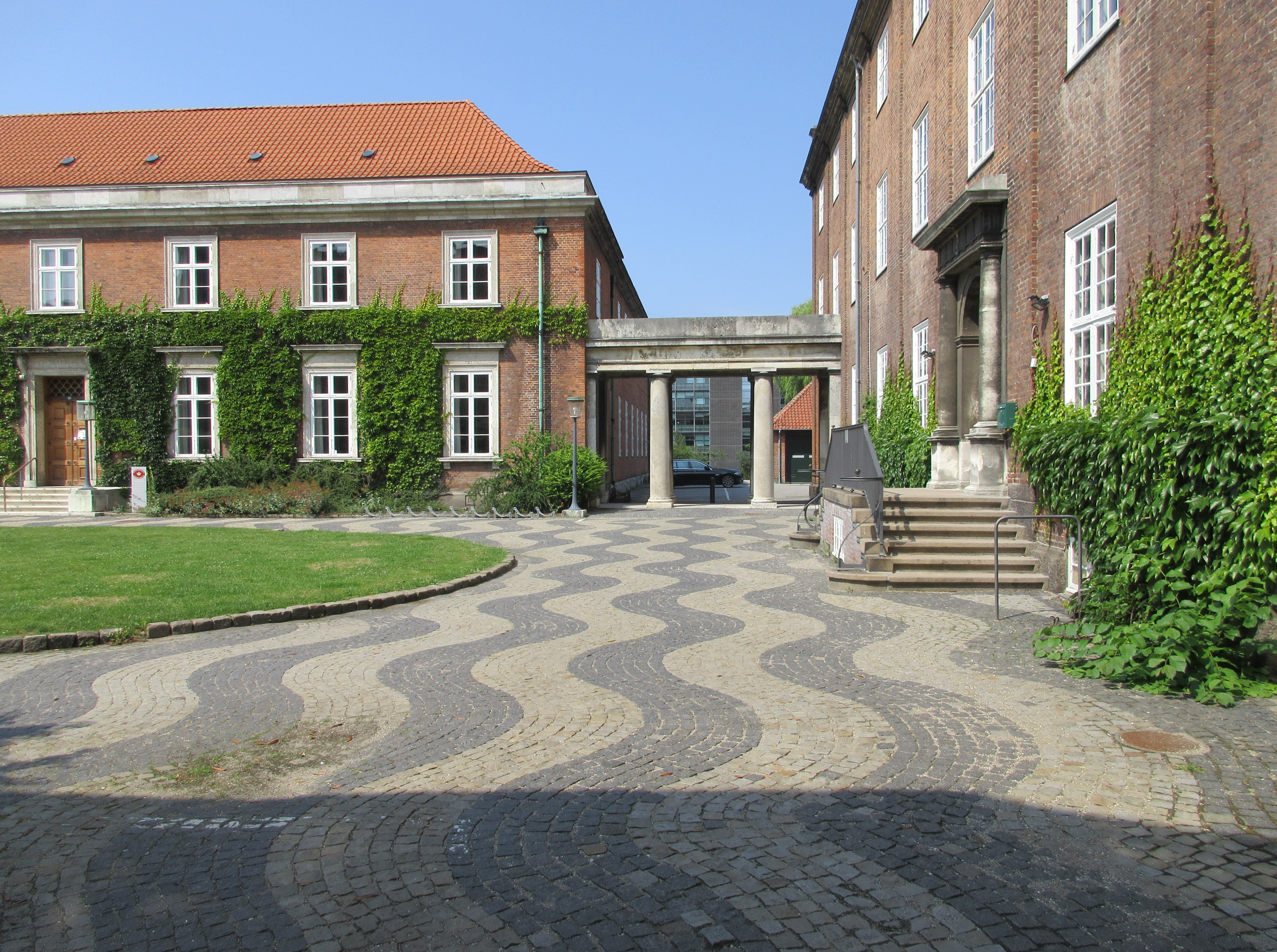
Frederiksberg Courthouse (left) and the former Frederiksberg Police station (right) connected by one of the two colonnades

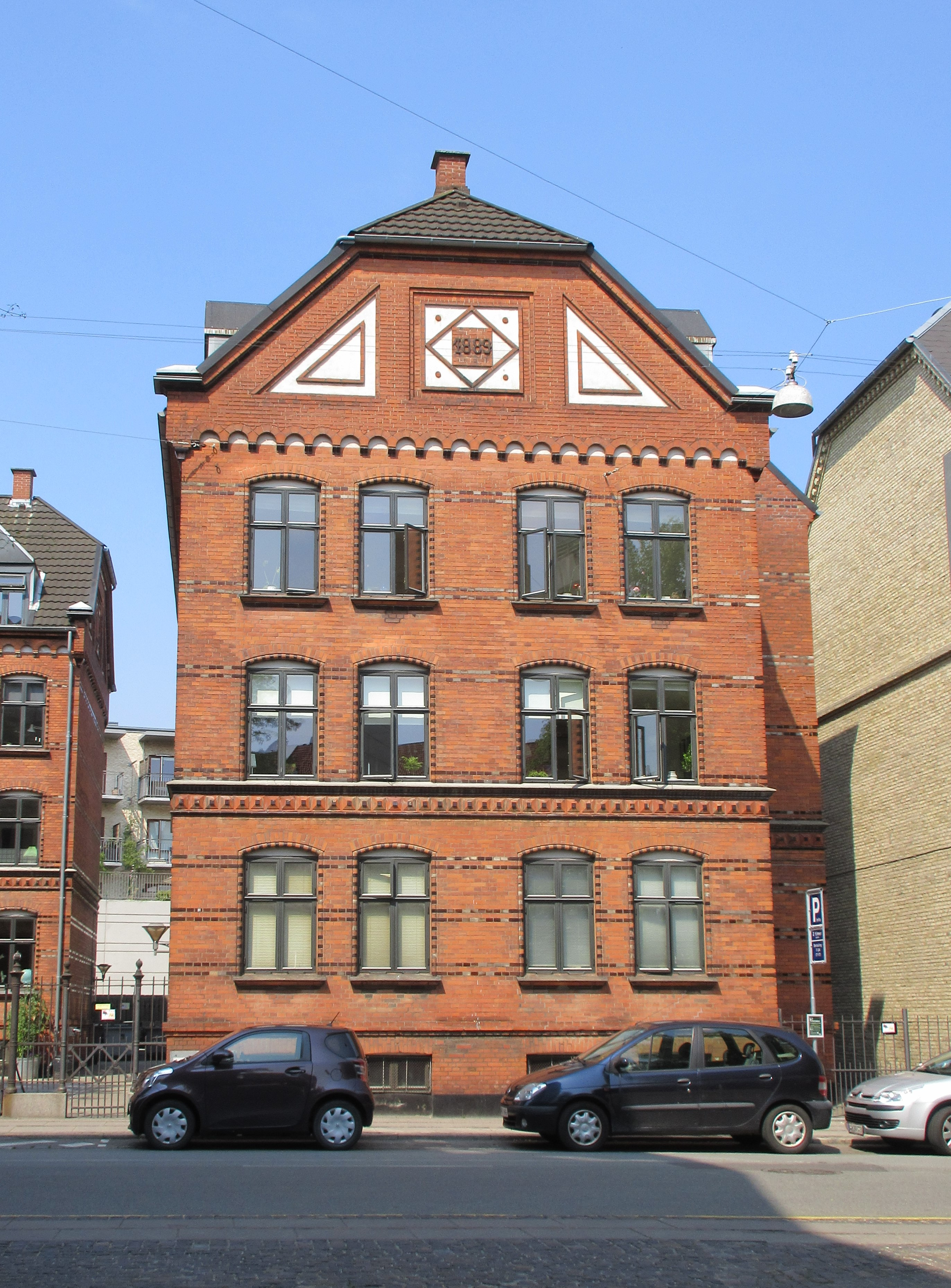
Howitzvej 20B

On the north side of the street is a complex of buildings which includes Frederiksberg Courthouse, Frederiksberg Fire Station, Solbjerg Church and the former Frederiksberg Police Station. The latter is now under conversion into the Student and Innovation House, a student run innovation house. The church, courthouse and police station surround a courtyard with a statue in a water basin. The three buildings are connected by two short colonnades. The police station building is to the east attached to the fire station (No. 26). Frederiksberg Courthouse was in 2010 expanded with an extension designed by 3XN. The new and old buildings are connected by a skyway.

== Transportation ==
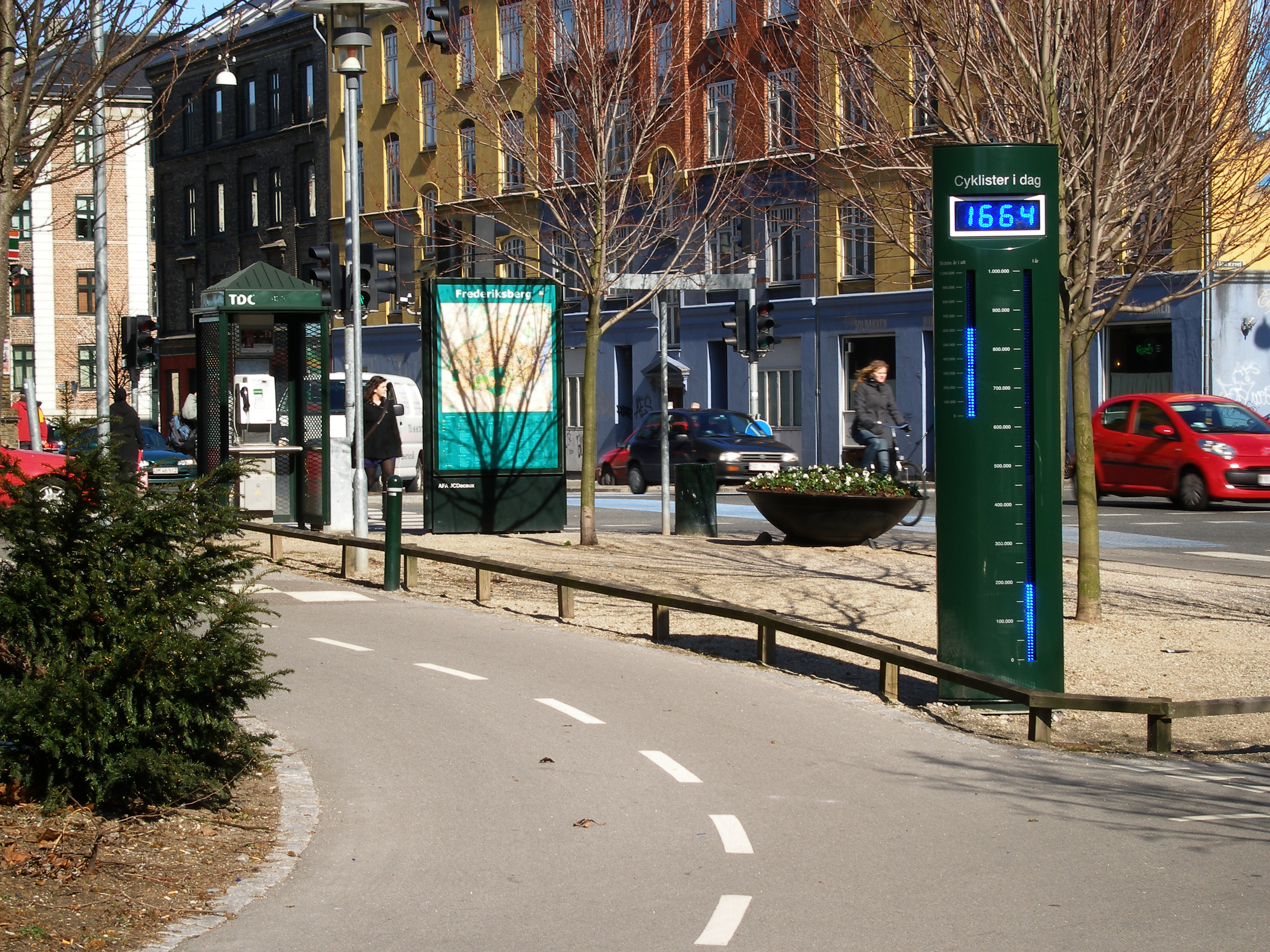
Greenway signpost on Howitzvej

Fasanvej metro station is located just south of the beginning of the street. The Nørrebro Route of Copenhagen's super bikeway network crosses the street just east of Nordre Fasanvej.

== Public art ==
On a gable at the corner of Nordre Fasanvej is a large mural depicting a tree. It was created by Thor Lindeneg.
