= Virket =

- Village
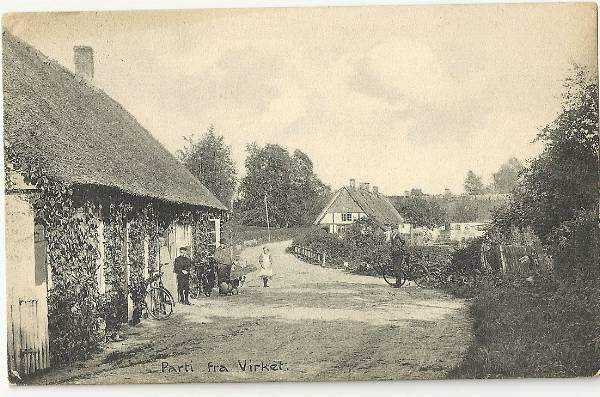
- Virket, Falster (1916 photo)

- Location on Falster
- Coordinates: 54°50′7″N 11°58′34″E
- Country: Denmark
- Region: Zealand (Sjælland)
- Municipality: Guldborgsund
- Time zone: UTC+1 (CET)
  - Summer (DST): UTC+2 (CEST)

Virket is a village in central Falster, Denmark. It belongs to Falkerslev Parish in Guldborgsund Municipality, in Region Zealand. It is located approximately 14 kilometres (8.7 mi) northeast of Nykøbing Falster. To the northwest is Falster Golf Club. The village lies along a road named Virketvej, which connects it to Kraghave, about 10 kilometres (6.2 mi) to the southwest.

== History ==
Saxo Grammaticus tells us that in the middle of the 12th century the inhabitants of Falster often fled to a large fortification to escape attacks by the Wendish fleets. He was probably referring to the huge earthworks, Falsters Virke, located beside Virket. In Old Norse, wirki meant fortification, as in the "Dannevirke" fortifications now in Schleswig-Holstein. First mentioned around 1250, the settlement was then documented as Wirky.

At one time there was a manor in Virket. There are references in 1430 and 1452 to a judge named Mogens Falster and in 1472 and 1494 to Jørgen Falster whose son, Laurids Falster, was still alive in 1536. A daughter of Jørgen Falster married Anders Josephsen Bielke in Bellinge, and their descendants called themselves Falster. Mogens Falster Bielke owned Virket in 1546.

A stone ring with one large stone and 16 smaller stones in a semicircle was created in 1947 to commemorate the independence gained by the local farmers in 1766.

== Archeological finds ==
In addition to Falsters Virket, recent archeological investigations have provided evidence of an early Iron Age settlement between Virket and Falkerslev. Graves from the Viking Age have also been uncovered in the area.

== Notable people ==
- Johanne Andersen (1913 in Virket – 1999) a Danish Lutheran priest, one of the first three women to be ordained into the Church of Denmark
