= Falster Golf Club =

Golf club in central Falster island, Denmark

- Location within Falster
- 54°50′15″N 11°57′40″E

Club information
- Location: Near Virket, Falster, Denmark
- Tota holes: 18

Falster Golf Club (Danish: Falster Golfklub) is a golf club in central Falster island, Denmark, to the northwest of the village of Virket. It is accessed via a road named Virketvej. The course is surrounded by extensive forest and has numerous streams and lakes in the vicinity; the largest lake is in the southeastern part of the course. The opening 9 holes are set on high land, and the back 9 are located on lower lying moorland and are generally narrower, lined with trees. The 8th hole is a long par five hole which involves a blind second short over a hill which crosses a fence. The website Top 100 Golf Courses ranks the course as the 26th best in Denmark. To the south of the club along the main road is Voldstedgaard, a house currently run as a B&B to cater to golfers playing at the club.
