= Ruth Vermehren =

Danish Lutheran priest

Ruth Vermehren (1894–1983) was a Danish Lutheran priest, one of the first three women to become priests of the Church of Denmark. An active member of the Danish Women's Society, she was frequently invited to preach at the organization's events. As a result of legislation introduced by the Church Minister Carl Hermansen in 1947, the following year, together with Johanne Andersen and Edith Brenneche Petersen, she was ordained by Bishop Hans Øllgaard in Odense Cathedral. Denmark thus became the first country in the world to have women priests. Vermehren then served as a priest in Copenhagen's Women's Prison until she retired in 1964.

== Biography ==
Born on 27 October 1894 in Copenhagen, Ruth Vermehren was the daughter of the painter Gustav Vermehren (1863–1931) and Louise Borchsenius (1862–1954). She was brought up in a cultural environment. Her father was an artist and her grandfather was the celebrated portrait painter Frederik Vermehren. From an early age, she was interested in religion, deciding to become a priest when she was preparing to be confirmed. After matriculating form N. Zahle's School in 1914, she began to study theology but soon had to abandon her studies for lack of funds. After working for a time as a secretary in Denmark's Christian Association (Danmarks Kristelige Studenterforbund), she returned to her studies in 1923, qualifying in 1927.

She devoted her future to the prisoners in Copenhagen's women's jails, initially without pay but from 1929 acting as a paid substitute for the priest when he was on holiday. She held services in the prison church but was unable to conduct communion. From 1921, backed by women's organizations, she campaigned for women's ordination but to no avail. She frequently preached at the events arranged by the Danish Women's Society. In 1944, 16 female theologians called on the Danish bishops to allow Vermehren to be ordained. After an initial refusal, in 1947 the Church Minister Carl Hermansen put forward legislation authorizing women to become priests. In 1948, Vermehren was ordained by the bishop of Funen, Hans Øllgaard, together with Johanne Andersen and Edith Brenneche Petersen. Thereafter she worked as the resident priest in Copenhagen's Women's Prison from 1949 to 1964. On her retirement, she was honoured with the Order of the Dannebrog.

Ruth Vermehren died in Copenhagen on 6 May 1983. She is buried in Hellerup Cemetery.

== See also ==
- Maren Sørensen
