= 2021 Zealand regional election =

← 2017	16 November 2021	2025 →

All 41 seats to the Zealand regional Council 21 seats needed for a majority
- Turnout: 453,149 (67.0%) ▼5.2pp
	First party	Second party	Third party
	A	V	C
Party	Social Democrats	Venstre	Conservatives
Last election	14 seats, 32.2%	10 seats, 23.9%	3 seats, 5.9%
Seats won	15	10	5
Seat change	▲1	0	▲2
Popular vote	152,243	91,027	50,917
Percentage	35.3%	21.1%	11.8%
Swing	▲3.1%	▼2.8%	▲5.9%
	Fourth party	Fifth party	Sixth party
	F	O	Ø
Party	Green Left	Danish People's Party	Red–Green Alliance
Last election	2 seats, 5.8%	6 seats, 14.3%	3 seats, 5.7%
Seats won	3	2	2
Seat change	▲1	▼4	▼1
Popular vote	29,882	25,831	24,067
Percentage	6.9%	6.0%	5.6%
Swing	▲1.1%	▼8.3%	▲0.1%
	Seventh party	Eighth party	Ninth party
	D	B	I
Party	New Right	Danish Social Liberal Party	Liberal Alliance
Last election	0 seats, 1.6%	2 seats, 4.2%	1 seat, 2.7%
Seats won	2	2	0
Seat change	▲2	0	▼1
Popular vote	22,862	15,810	7,503
Percentage	5.3%	3.7%	1.7%
Swing	▲3.7%	▲0.5%	▼1.0%
Chairperson before election
Heino Knudsen
Social Democrats
Chairperson after election
Heino Knudsen
Social Democrats

The 2021 Zealand regional election was held on November 16, 2021, to elect the 41 members to sit in the regional council for the Central Denmark Region, in the period of 2022 to 2025.

Following the 2017 election, Heino Knudsen became chairperson of the region, gaining the position from Venstre.

For this election, Knudsen stood once again and attempted to become the first chairperson of the region to be re-elected. In the result, the parties commonly associated with the red bloc had won 22 seats, one more than in 2017. This was the only region where those parties increased their number of seats. The next day, it was announced that the parties had reached an agreement to support Heino Knudsen for a second term. A constitutional agreement was later announced, which included all parties who won seats, except for the New Right.

== Electoral Alliances ==
Electoral Alliance 1

Party		Political Position
A	Social Democrats	Centre-left
H	Din Stemme	Local Politics
N	Guldborgsundlisten	Local Politics

Electoral Alliance 2

Party		Political Position
F	Green Left	Centre-left to Left-wing
G	Vegan Party	Centre-left to Left-wing
Ø	Red–Green Alliance	Left-wing to Far-left
Å	The Alternative	Centre-left to Left-wing

Electoral Alliance 3

Party		Political Position
B	Danish Social Liberal Party	Centre to Centre-left
I	Liberal Alliance	Centre-right to Right-wing
K	Christian Democrats	Centre to Centre-right

Electoral Alliance 4

Party		Political Position
C	Conservatives	Centre-right
D	New Right	Right-wing
O	Danish People's Party	Right-wing
V	Venstre	Centre-right

== Results by constituencies and municipalities ==
This is a list of results of the following parties
A = Social Democrats
B = Social Liberals
C = Conservatives
D = New Right
F = Green Left
G = Vegan Party
H = Din Stemme
I = Liberal Alliance
K = Christian Democrats
L = Lokallisten Lolland
N = Guldborgsundlisten
O = Danish People's Party
V = Venstre
Æ = Freedom List
Ø = Red–Green Alliance
Å = The Alternative

=== Constituencies ===
Division	A	B	C	D	F	G	H	I	K	L	N	O	V	Æ	Ø	Å
Division	%	%	%	%	%	%	%	%	%	%	%	%	%	%	%	%
Zealand	35.3	3.7	11.8	5.3	6.9	0.5	0.2	1.7	0.5	0.2	0.5	6.0	21.1	0.3	5.6	0.3

=== Municipalities ===
Division	A	B	C	D	F	G	H	I	K	L	N	O	V	Æ	Ø	Å
Division	%	%	%	%	%	%	%	%	%	%	%	%	%	%	%	%
Lolland	60.5	1.1	4.5	4.0	3.3	0.3	2.8	0.4	0.2	3.0	0.1	4.6	11.6	0.1	3.2	0.2
Guldborgsund	44.8	2.1	7.4	4.6	4.8	0.4	0.2	0.7	0.4	0.3	6.3	10.2	13.0	0.3	4.1	0.3
Vordingborg	39.5	2.9	10.7	4.5	6.8	0.5	0.1	0.7	0.3	0.1	0.1	4.9	20.4	0.6	7.2	0.6
Næstved	37.6	3.4	14.3	7.2	5.6	0.4	0.1	1.7	0.3	0.1	0.1	5.0	19.0	0.3	4.9	0.3
Faxe	34.2	2.3	9.6	6.0	6.7	0.3	0.0	1.9	0.3	0.4	0.0	7.9	25.0	0.3	4.9	0.2
Stevns	29.4	3.7	14.5	5.5	7.1	0.3	0.1	1.2	0.4	0.1	0.1	7.2	23.5	0.3	6.3	0.3
Køge	30.2	4.1	18.9	4.4	9.3	0.4	0.0	1.5	0.5	0.1	0.0	4.7	20.4	0.2	4.7	0.4
Lejre	23.7	4.9	13.2	4.0	12.4	0.5	0.1	2.0	0.5	0.1	0.0	4.6	25.4	0.3	8.0	0.4
Greve	29.2	3.1	13.4	4.9	5.0	0.4	0.0	1.7	0.7	0.1	0.0	5.8	30.9	0.2	4.5	0.2
Solrød	27.4	2.9	17.4	5.7	5.2	0.4	0.9	7.3	0.3	0.1	0.0	6.0	22.0	0.2	3.8	0.3
Roskilde	26.8	6.1	15.2	3.4	12.5	0.6	0.0	3.6	0.4	0.1	0.0	5.7	16.7	0.2	8.2	0.4
Holbæk	41.9	5.0	7.2	4.0	5.1	0.4	0.0	1.5	0.3	0.0	0.0	4.9	23.2	0.2	5.9	0.2
Kalundborg	32.3	3.0	7.2	8.0	6.6	0.3	0.1	0.8	0.2	0.1	0.1	8.1	26.9	0.6	5.5	0.2
Odsherred	37.0	5.0	6.4	6.6	5.9	0.8	0.1	0.9	0.3	0.1	0.1	8.1	21.6	0.6	6.3	0.4
Ringsted	28.8	2.7	20.2	5.0	6.6	0.4	0.0	1.3	2.9	0.0	0.0	4.3	20.2	0.6	6.6	0.3
Sorø	35.6	4.0	16.8	5.7	7.5	0.5	0.1	1.4	0.6	0.0	0.1	5.3	16.2	0.6	5.4	0.4
Slagelse	34.6	3.3	8.4	7.3	5.4	0.6	0.0	1.7	0.4	0.1	0.1	5.7	27.2	0.3	4.7	0.3

== Results ==
Party		Votes	%	+/-	Seats	+/-
Zealand Region
A	Social Democrats	152,243	35.31	+3.11	15	+1
V	Venstre	91,027	21.11	-2.80	10	0
C	Conservatives	50,917	11.81	+5.86	5	+2
F	Green Left	29,882	6.93	+1.19	3	+1
O	Danish People's Party	25,831	5.99	-8.32	2	-4
Ø	Red-Green Alliance	24,067	5.58	-0.17	2	-1
D	New Right	22,862	5.30	+3.68	2	+2
B	Social Liberals	15,810	3.67	-0.52	2	0
I	Liberal Alliance	7,503	1.74	-0.98	0	-1
N	Guldborgsundlisten	2,269	0.53	-0.28	0	0
K	Christian Democrats	2,099	0.49	+0.21	0	0
G	Vegan Party	1,950	0.45	New	0	New
Å	The Alternative	1,439	0.33	-1.38	0	0
Æ	Freedom List	1,354	0.31	New	0	New
L	Lokallisten Lolland	1,018	0.24	-0.04	0	0
H	Din Stemme	895	0.21	-0.04	0	0
Total		431,166	100	N/A	41	N/A
Invalid votes		2,137	0.32	+0.07		
Blank votes		19,846	2.93	-0.07		
Turnout		453,149	66.96	-4.90		
Source: valg.dk
