= Frederiksberg Courthouse =

Building in Frederiksburg, Denmark

- Frederiksberg Domhus
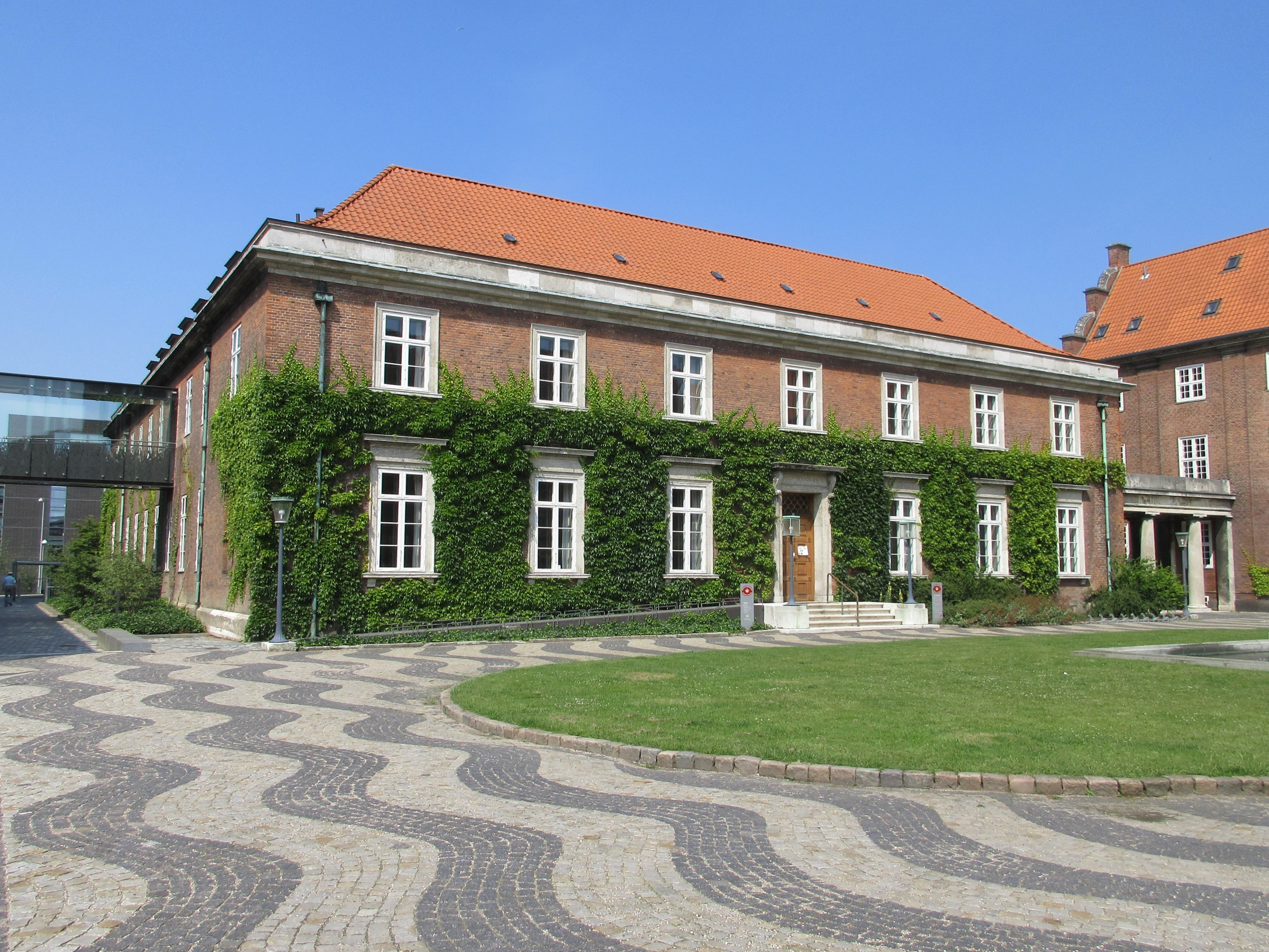
- Frederiksberg Courthouse viewed from the plaza
- Interactive map of the Frederiksberg Courthouse area

General information
- Architectural style: Neoclassical
- Location: Frederiksberg, Copenhagen, Denmark
- Coordinates: 55.6803°N 12.5288°E
- Construction started: 1919
- Completed: 1921

Design and construction
- Architect: Hack Kampmann

Frederiksberg Courthouse (Danish: Frederiksberg Domhus) is a courthouse in Frederiksberg, an independent municipality in Copenhagen, Denmark. The building was completed in 1921 to designs by Hack Kampmann as part of a larger complex at Howitzvej which also included a new fire station and a police station. The latter is connected both to the courthouse and Solbjerg Church by short colonnades.

Both the courthouse and the police station as well as a courtyard space situated to the rear of the complex were listed in 1997. An extension of the courtyard is currently (ultimo 2012) under construction to designs by 3XN.

== History ==
The project originally comprised only a fire station and a police station. It was decided to build them next to Solbjerg Church which had been completed in 1908 in the grounds where Frederiksberg Hospital had previously been located. A design competition was won by professor Hack Kampmann in 1914 and the police station was completed in 1919. When a reform of the jurisdictional system prompted the need for a courthouse in Frederiksberg, it was decided to build it next to the two other buildings and Kampmann was charged with its design. Construction began in 1919 and the building was completed by Kaj Gottlob after Kampmann's death. It was inaugurated on 22 October 1921.

== Architecture ==
Kampmann's courthouse is designed in the Neoclassical under influence from Carl Petersen, who had generated renewed interest in Christian Frederiksen's architecture.

It is a two-storey, rectangular building surrounding a courtyard with a sculpture of Justitia designed by Einar Utzon-Frank. The building is constructed in red brick while the plinth, a dominant cornice just below the roof and the framing around the windows is of Faxe limestone. The drain pipes and detailing on the cornice and at the windows are in copper. The windows are painted white towards the street and black facing the courtyard. The roof is hipped towards the street with a low Mansard towards the courtyard.

The plan is symmetrical and identical on both two floors, which are connected by a round staircase. The connecting hallways follow the courtyard side of the building whereas the offices face the street. The court rooms are located in the south wing. There are four court rooms, located opposite each other, two on each floor. The two court rooms on the ground floor which were originally used for criminal cases are connected to the police station by an underground passageway. All four courtrooms have semi-circular reliefs by Utzon-Frank. Smaller ones designed by two students at the Royal Academy of Arts are found above the doors in the hallway on both floors.

== Police Station ==
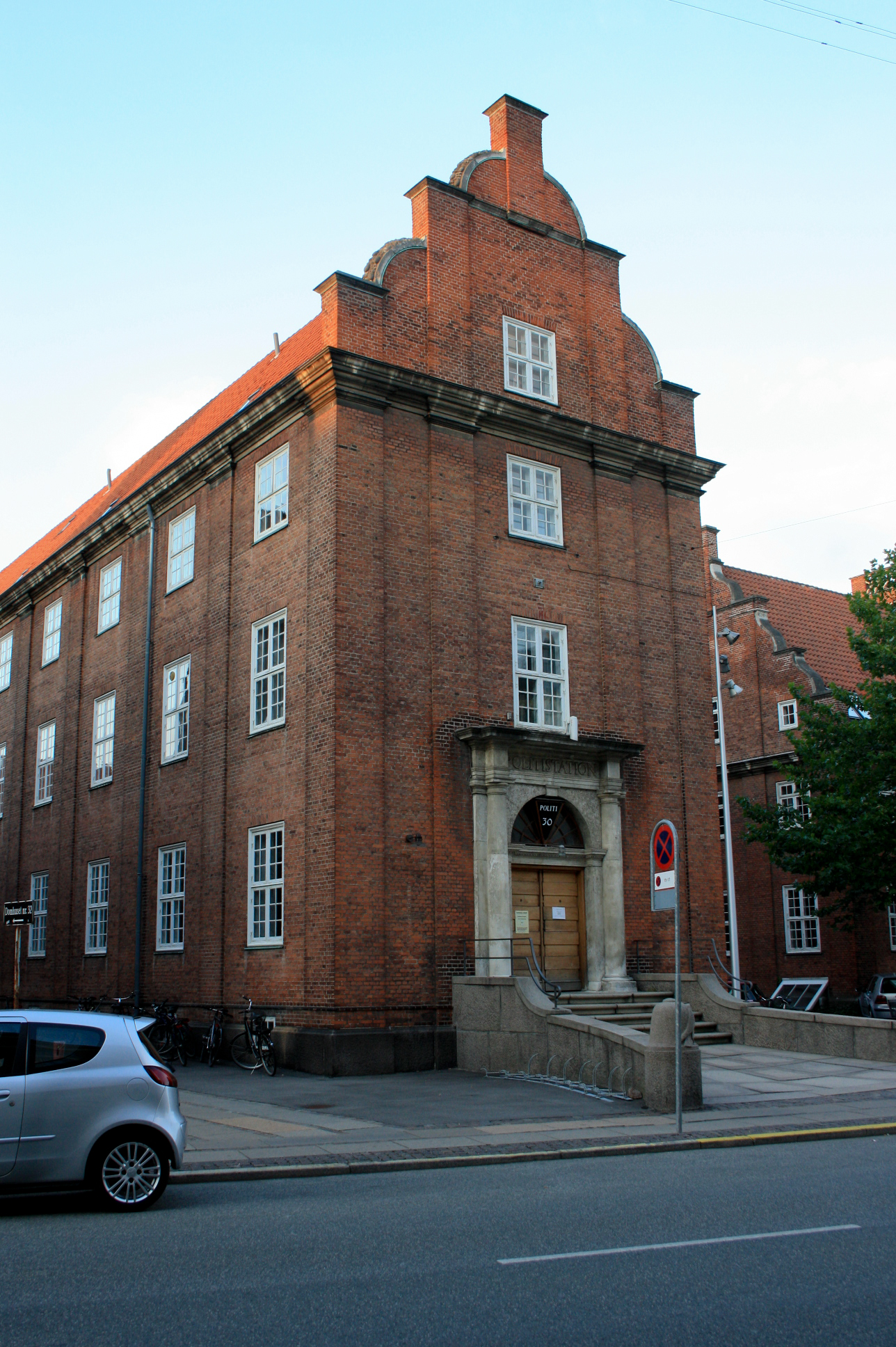
The police station

The police station is a tall, narrow, wing; located just left of the courthouse and connected to it by a short colonnade. Another short colonnade connects it to Solbjerg Church on the opposite side. The masonry of the facades is decorated with vines and a distinctive gable faces the street. A short flight of stairs lead up to the entrance which is decorated with a portico.

== Courtyard ==
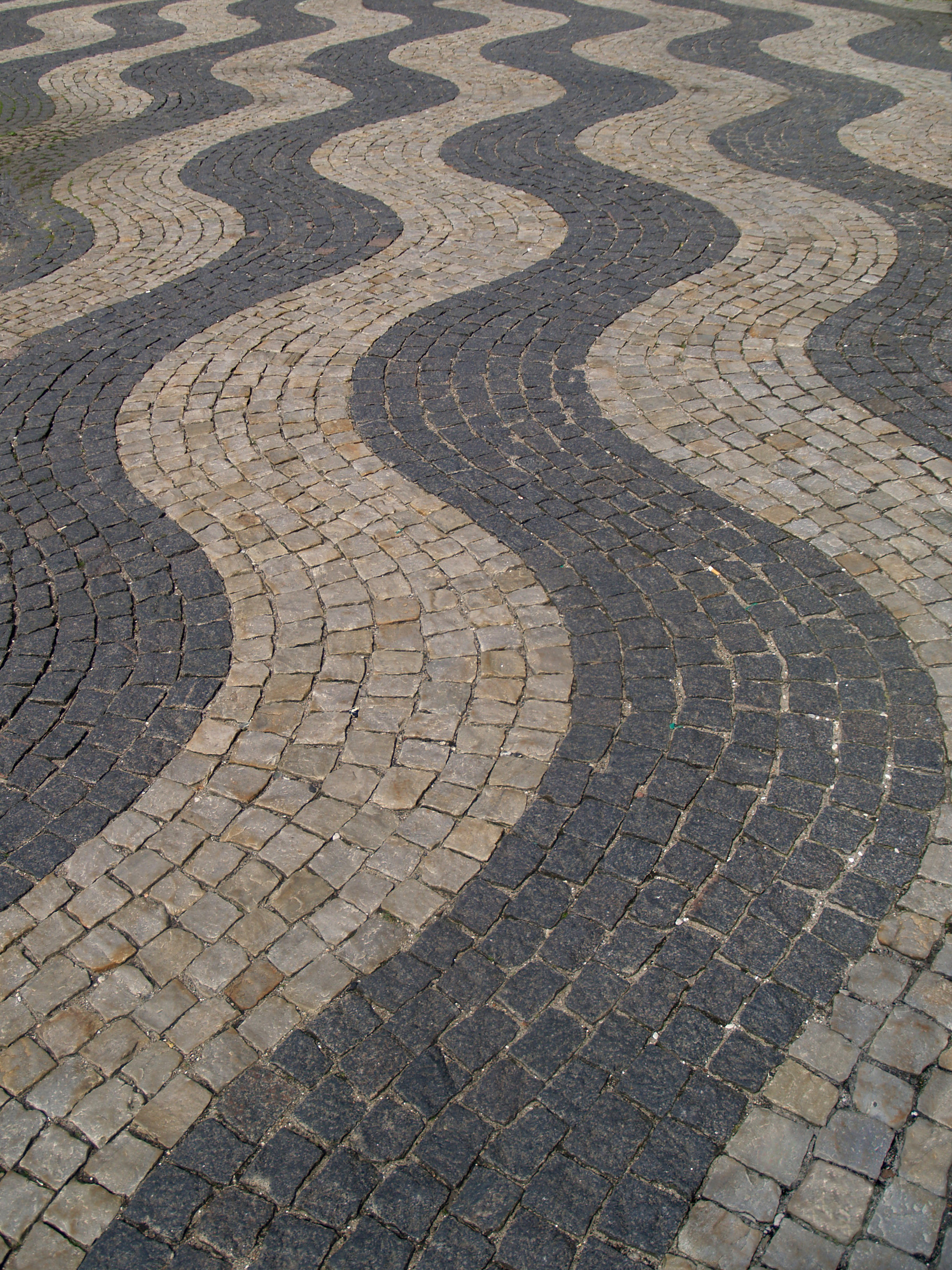
The paving on the plaza

A second entrance to the courtyard, for staff, is located on the rear of the building as seen from Howitzvej. Access is through a gateway in the connector between the courthouse and the police station, opening to a courtyard space which was also designed by Kampmann. Its setts form a wavy pattern of varying amplitude depending on the location on the plaza. The design bears a striking resemblance to the famous works of Roberto Burle Marx in Rio de Janeiro thirty years later (compare here). There is an oval lawn with a basin in the centre of the space. The bronze sculpture in the basin, designed by Christian Pauli Max Andersen and depicting Hercules, The Snake Killer is an addition from 1930.

== Extension ==
The building is currently under expansion to designs by 3XN.
