= Kraghave =

- Village
- Location on Falster
- Coordinates: 54°47′39″N 11°52′15″E
- Country: Denmark
- Region: Zealand (Sjælland)
- Municipality: Guldborgsund
- Time zone: UTC+1 (CET)
  - Summer (DST): UTC+2 (CEST)

Kraghave is a village in western Falster, Denmark. It belongs to Guldborgsund Municipality, in Region Zealand. It is located just to the north of Nykøbing Falster, along European route E55. It is connected by road to Virket, about 10 kilometres (6.2 mi) to the northeast. It is bordered by Bangsebro just to the southeast and Stubberup to the north.
