= Øster Ulslev =

- Town
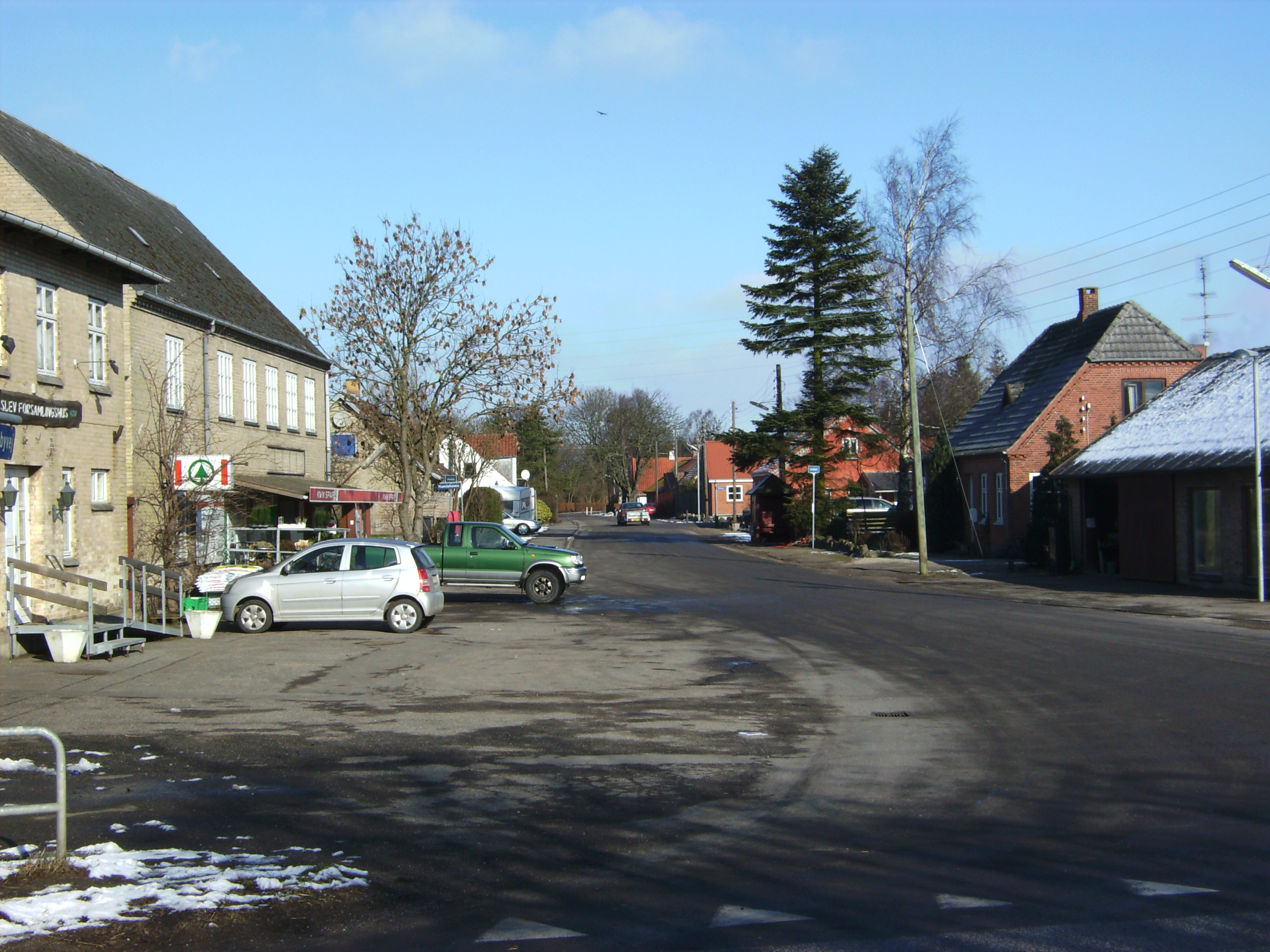
- Øster Ulslev, Lolland

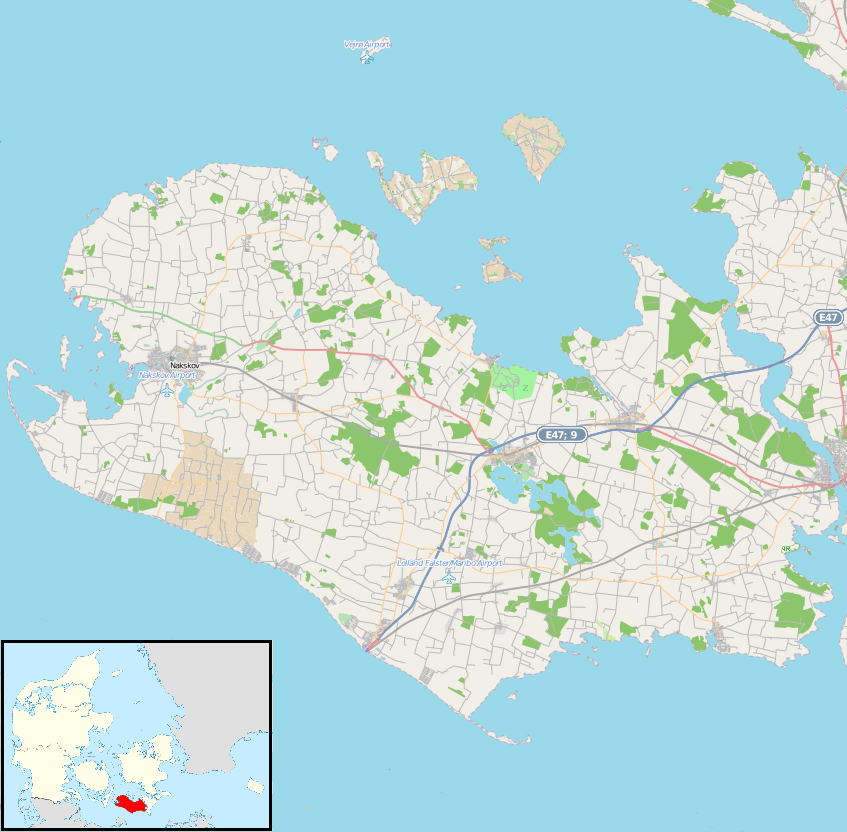
- Location on Lolland
- Coordinates: 54°41′54″N 11°37′38″E
- Country: Denmark
- Region: Zealand (Sjælland)
- Municipality: Guldborgsund

Population (2026)
  - Total: 235
- Time zone: UTC+1 (CET)
  - Summer (DST): UTC+2 (CEST)

Øster Ulslev is a village in the southeast of the Danish island of Lolland. As of 2026, it has a population of 235.
