= Solbjerg Church =

Coordinates: 55.6799°N 12.5289°E

- Solbjerg Kirke
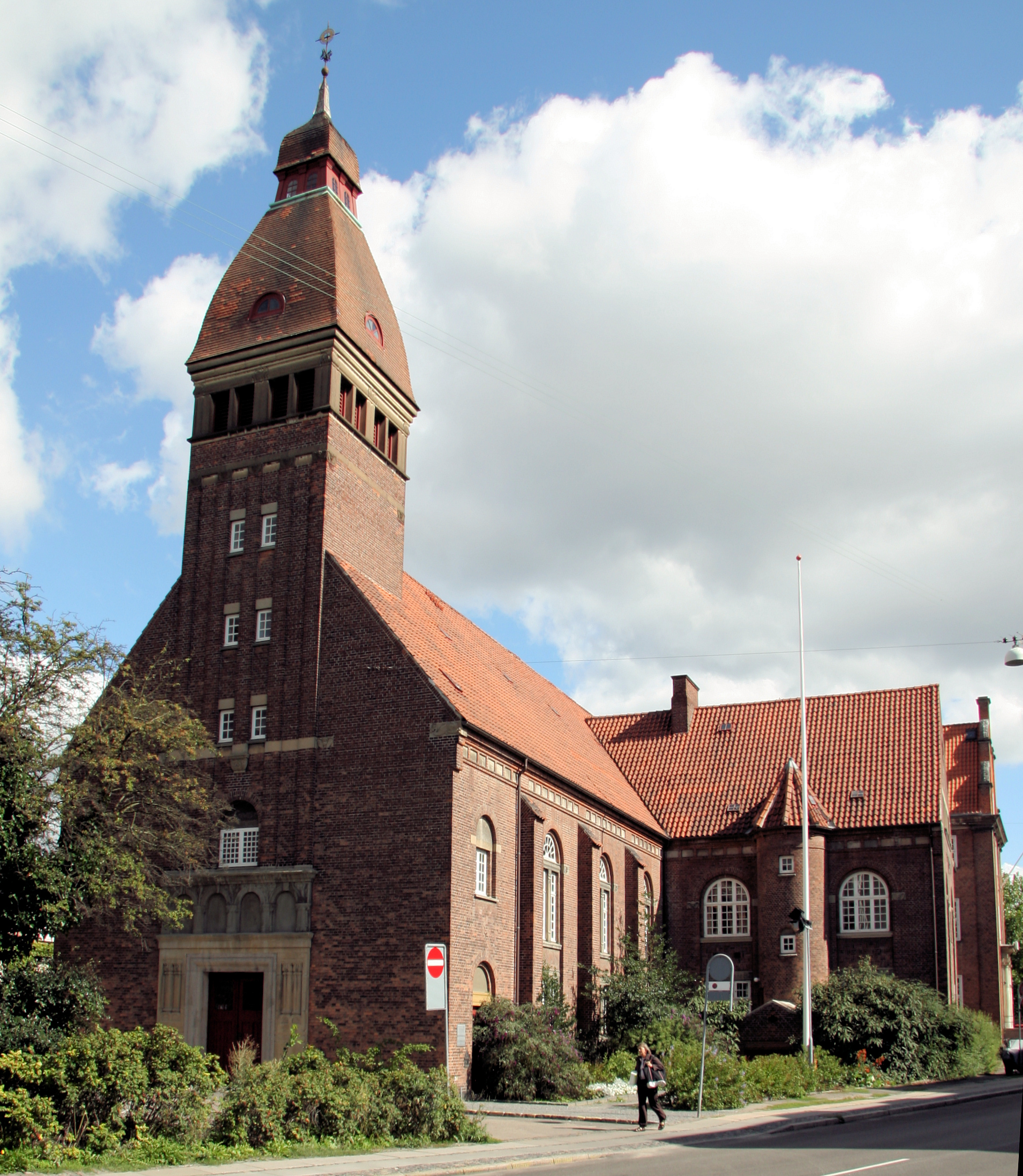
- Solbjerg Church
- Location: Copenhagen
- Country: Denmark
- Denomination: Church of Denmark
- Website: Church website

History
- Status: Active

Architecture
- Functional status: Parish Church
- Architect: Kristoffer Varming
- Years built: 1907-1908

Administration
- Diocese: Copenhagen
- Parish: Solbjerg

Clergy
- Bishop: Peter Skov-Jakobsen
- Pastor(s): Lars Danner Madsen; Karin Franijeur Znaider

Solbjerg Church (Danish: Solbjerg Kirke) is a church in the Frederiksberg district of Copenhagen, Denmark. It is located at 34 Howitzvej, just north of Frederiksberg Gardens, and is one of 16 churches which have been designated for closure by the Diocese of Copenhagen.

== History ==
Solbjerg Church was designed by Kristoffer Varming and built from 1907 to 1908. The area was still relatively open at that time. In 1921, the church was joined by a new police station and a courthouse. In 1980, the interior was hit by fire. In 2011, the governing body (Stiftsrådet) of the Diocese of Copenhagen listed it as one of 16 churches which were designated for closure.

== Architecture ==
The church is constructed in red brick. A colonnade connects it to a complex consisting of the former Frederiksberg Police Station and Frederiksberg Courthouse.
