= Frederiksberg Hospital =

- Capital Region of Denmark
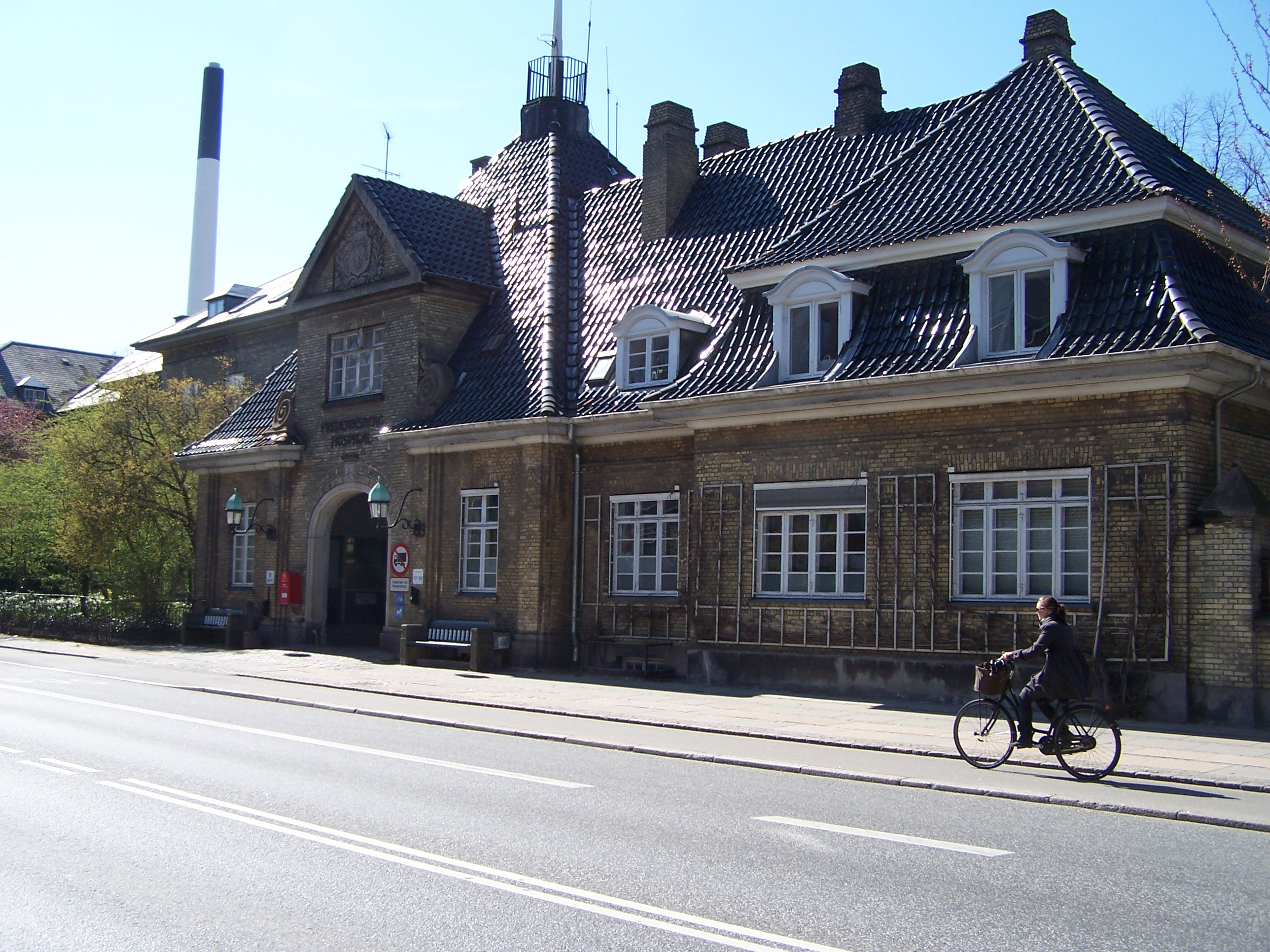

Geography
- Location: Nordre Fasanvej 57, 2000 Frederiksberg, Capital Region, Denmark
- Coordinates: 55°41′10″N 12°31′20″E

Organisation
- Type: Teaching, General
- Affiliated university: University of Copenhagen

Services
- Emergency department: Yes

Helipads
- Helipad: No

Links
- Website: www.frederiksberghospital.dk

Frederiksberg Hospital is a medium-sized government-owned general hospital located in Frederiksberg, Denmark. It has 380 beds (2005) and an emergency department.

The hospital is a teaching hospital for medical students from Copenhagen University.

Frederiksberg Hospital is scheduled to close at the end of 2026 and transfer its functions to Bispebjerg Hospital. The hospital site is being redeveloped as a mixed-use neighbourhood.

== History ==
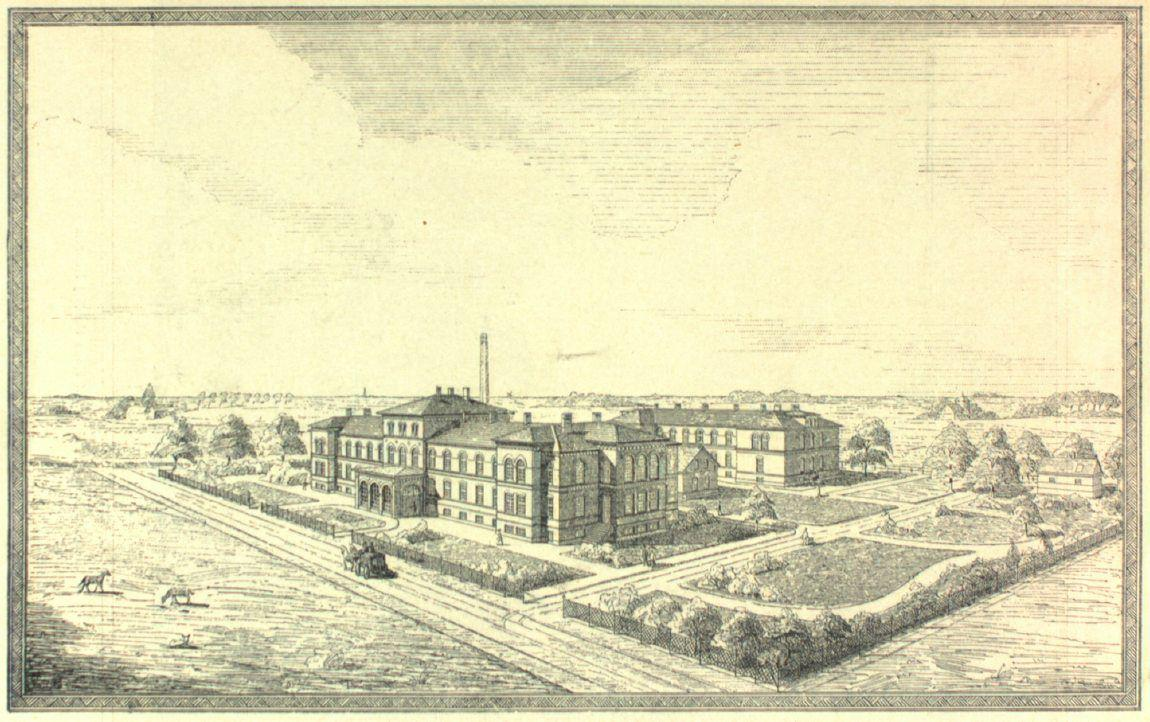
Copenhagen County Hospital

The hospital was inaugurated 1903 as a replacement for the city's older hospital that had become too small.

During World War II, the German occupying power seized part of the hospital, the so-called tyske lazaret på Nyelandsvej, where a number of wounded members of the resistance died in German custody.

The hospital grew with the city until 1970 where it housed 1,000 beds. Since then, it has become more specialized and as a result, the number of beds has decreased. The hospital is organised under Region Hovedstaden since January 1, 2007. Prior to this date, the hospital was part of the formal network of hospitals in the greater Copenhagen area (Hovedstadens Sygehusfællesskab), where each hospital specialised in a number of disciplines.

Psychiatric Center Frederiksberg is located at Frederiksberg Hospital, although the center is organised under the region-wide psychiatric hospital, Region Hovedstadens Psykiatri.

== See also ==
- Ole Bang
