= Guldborgsundlisten =

Guldborgsundlisten Guldborgsundlisten
- Leader: John Brædder^{da}
- Founded: 2001
- Headquarters: Guldborgsund
- Ideology: Pragmatism
- Colors: Light blue
- Regions: 0 / 205
- The Danish Parliament: 0 / 179
- European Parliament: 0 / 13
- Municipal councils: 11 / 2,432

Website
- Guldborgsundlisten.dk

Guldborgsundlisten, formerly Nyt Nykøbing Falster and then Nyt Guldborgsund, is a Danish local political party set in Guldborgsund Municipality.^{da}

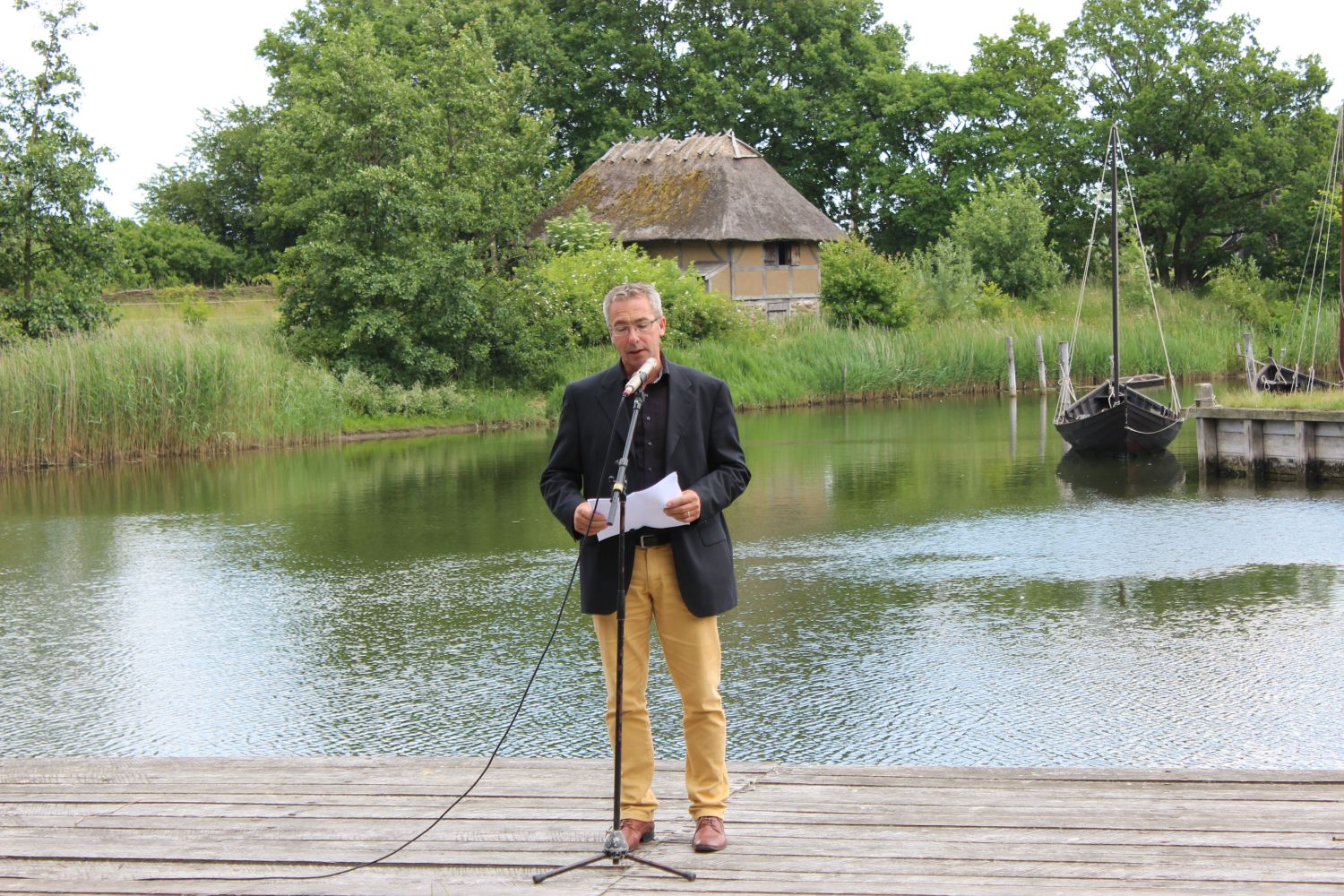
The party leader John Brædder was mayor of Guldborgsund Municipality from 2010 to 2021. Seen here at the Middlealdercentret^{da} in 2013.

Guldborgsundlisten's John Brædder has been mayor in the municipality from 2010 to 2021.

At the election in 2017 in Denmark, the party got over 33% of all the votes in the municipality, and thus became the local list with the highest vote share in the whole country. In the municipal elections in 2021, the party lost two mandates, and the post of mayor passed to Simon Hansen from the Social Democrats.

== History ==
Nyt Nykøbing Falster ran with 22 candidates in Nykøbing Falster Municipality in 2001. Here, they received 6,345 votes, equal to 37.36% of all votes in that municipality, giving them 9 seats in the municipal council. The party changed name to Nyt Guldborgsund after this election.

The party ran with 32 candidates in 2005, where they received 6,044 votes in Guldborgsund Municipality. This was equal to 16.7% of all votes in that municipality, and gave them 5 seats in the municipal council.

Nyt Guldborgsund ran with 13 candidates in 2009. The party received 3,576 votes, 10.7% of all votes in Guldborgsund Municipality. This resulted in 4 seats in the municipal council. After this election, the name of the party was changed to Guldborgsundlisten.

In 2013, the party ran with 27 candidates in Guldborgsund Municipality. They received 6,573 votes, equal to 18.1% of all votes in that municipality. This resulted in six seats in the municipal council. The elected politicians for the list was chairman John Brædder, Peter Bring-Larsen, Martin Lohse, Helle Munk, Poul-Henrik Pedersen and Jens Erik Boesen.

== Guldborgsundlisten politicians ==
=== Party chairman ===
- John Brædder

== Election results ==
=== Municipal elections ===
Date	Votes		Seats	±
Date	#	%	Seats	±
2001	6,345	37.36	9 / 21	0
2005	6,044	16.7	5 / 29	▼4
2009	3,576	10.7	4 / 29	▼1
2013	6,573	18.1	6 / 29	▲2
2017	11,727	33.1	11 / 29	▲5

Municipal council (Danish kommunalbestyrelse) seats numbered a total of 29 in municipal elections 2005, 2009, 2013, and 2017. In municipal elections 2001, mentioned in the table, there were 21 seats in the municipality of Nykøbing Falster, which was one of six municipalities that would merge 1 January 2007 to form Guldborgsund Municipality.
