= Listed buildings in Østerbro =

This list of listed buildings in Østerbro lists listed buildings and structures in the Østerbro district of Copenhagen, Denmark.

== List ==
=== 2100 København Ø ===
Listing name	Image	Location	Year built	Contributing resource	Ref
Bien		Østerbrogade 29B, 2100 København Ø		Three winged building built 1857–58 and 1879–80 to a Historicist design by Ferdinand Meldahl and the two zinc statues flanking te main entrance	
Institute for the Blind		Kastelsvej 60, 2100 København Ø		Four-winged Historicist complex designed by Vilhelm Dahlerup and the two zinc statues that flank the main entrance	
Boldklubben af 1893's Tennishal		Gunnar Nu Hansens Plads 11, 2100 København Ø		B1893s's tennis hall with the short wall and gate pillars on Per Henrik Lings Allé from 1912 designed by Søren Lemche Jacobsen and the engineer Edouard Suenson	
Brumleby (20)		Kastelsvej 60, 2100 København Ø		Four-winged Historicist complex designed by Vilhelm Dahlerup and the two zinc statues that flank the main entrance	
C.F. Aagaard House		Rosenvængets Allé 46, 2100 København Ø	1875	House from 1875 designed by Vilhelm Dahlerup	
Classens Have		Arendalsgade 6, 2100 København Ø		The garden complex "Classens Have" from 1925 by city gardener Valdemar Fabricius Hansen	
Dahlerups Pakhus		Vesterbrogade 34, 1620 København V	1907	Warehouse from 1894 associated with the Freeport and designed by Vilhelm Dahlerup	
Den Frie Udstilling		Oslo Plads 1, 2100 København Ø	18998	Exhibition building from 1898 designed by Jens Ferdinand Willumsen and later expanded several times	
Frihavnens Elektriske Centralstation		Dampfærgevej 2, 2100 København Ø		Power station from 1894-95 by Vilhelm Dahlerup with expansion from 1890	
Frihavnens Elektriske Centralstation		Dampfærgevej 6A, 2100 København Ø		Workshop building from 1913 by Henning Jørgensen	
Frihavnens Elektriske Centralstation		Dampfærgevej 6B, 2100 København Ø	1920/1949	Boiler house with associated chimneys from 1899 by Fr. L. Levy	
Gefion		Østbanegade 19, 2100 København Ø	1895		
Gefion Bridge		Langelinie 0, 2100 København Ø	1858	Reinforced concrete bridge from 1895 by Asger Ostenfeld and Vilhelm Dahlerup	
Glacisgården		Østbanegade 11, 2100 København Ø	1904	Apartment building from 1904 designed by Aage Langeland-Mathiesen	
Kanslergården		Jagtvej 200, 2100 København Ø		Residential complex with two inner courtyards from 1919 by Henning Hansen	
Kastellet		Kastellet 1, 2100 København Ø	1663	Vestre Kaponiere	
Kastellet		Kastellet 82, 2100 København Ø	1663	Generalstok	
Kastellet		Kastellet 82, 2100 København Ø	1663	Østre Kaponiere	
Kastellet		Kastellet 1, 2100 København Ø	1663	The rampart	
Kastellet		Kastellet 1, 2100 København Ø	1663	The rampart	
Kastellet		Kastellet 1, 2100 København Ø	1663	The rampart	
Kastellet		Kastellet 102, 2100 København Ø	1663	Fortunstol	
Kastellet		Kastellet 50, 2100 København Ø	1663	Kastelskirken: church from 1704	
Kastellet		Kastellet 42, 2100 København Ø	1663	Nordre Magasin: storage building from 1663	
Kastellet		Kastellet 19, 2100 København Ø	1842	Materialgården	
Kastellet		Kastellet 14A, 2100 København Ø	1663	Artilleristok	
Kastellet		Kastellet 13A, 2100 København Ø	1725	Kommandantboligen: house from 1725	
Kastellet		Kastellet 2, 2100 København Ø	1663	Stjernestok	
Kastellet		Kastellet 1, 2100 København Ø	1663	Søndre Magasin	
Kastellet		Kastellet 1, 2100 København Ø	1663	Kongeporten: gate facing the city	
Kastellet		Kastellet 1, 2100 København Ø	1663	Norgesporten: the gate facing away from the city (now Østerport)	
Kastellet		Kastellet 1, 2100 København Ø	1663	Svanestok	
Kastellet		Kastellet 1, 2100 København Ø	1663	Elefantstok	
Kastellet		Kastellet 92, 2100 København Ø	1663	Fortunstok	
Kastellet		Kastellet 1, 2100 København Ø	1847	Kastelsmøllen: smock mill from 1847	
Kastellet		Grønningen 2, 2100 København Ø	1847	Smedehuset	
Kastellet		Grønningen 2, 2100 København Ø	1847	Smedehuset	
Kastellet		Kastellet 1, 2100 København Ø	1663	Krudthus (Dronningens Bastion): gunpowder magazine from 1712 by Domenico Pelli	
Kastellet		Kastellet 1, 2100 København Ø	1874	Hovedvagten: Cors du Guard from 1874	
Østerport station		Oslo Plads 8, 2100 København Ø	1883	Railway station from 1896 designed by Heinrich Wenck	
Østre Gasværk		Nyborggade 17, 2100 København Ø	1883	Gasometer from 1883 designed by Martin Nyrop	
Paustiam House		Kalkbrænderiløbskaj 2, København Ø	1967/2010	Furniture store from 1967 designed by Jørn Utzon and extension from 2010 designed by Kim Utzon	
P. C. Skovgaard House		Rosenvængets Hovedvej 27A, 2100 København Ø	1967/2010	House from 1860 by Johan Daniel Herholdt	
Strandboulevarden 35		Strandboulevarden 35, 2100 København Ø		Apartment building from 1902 by Eugen Jørgensen	
Silo Warehouse		Nyborggade 17, 2100 København Ø	1903	Warehouse from 1903 associated with the Freeport and designed by Fr. L. Levy	
Soldenfeldts Stiftelse		Ryesgade 104A, 2100 København Ø	1894	Residential building from 1894 designed by Hermann Baagøe Storck	
Sortedam Dossering 55: Christianshvile		Sortedam Dossering 55, 2100 København Ø	1869	House from 1860 designed by Georg Møller and the two buildings immediately to the west	

=== 2900 Hellerup ===
Listing name	Image	Location	Year built	Contributing resource	Ref
Ehlersvej 17		Ehlersvej 17, 2900 Hellerup	1931	House with garage, walls and gate designed by Frits Schlegel	
Gammel Vartovvej 22		Gammel Vartov Vej 22, 2900 Hellerup	1920/1949	House from 1920 designed by Aage Rafn with extension from 1933 by Ole Jacobsen, garage building from 1949 and shed	
Gammel Vartovvej 22		Gammel Vartov Vej 22, 2900 Hellerup	1920/1949	House from 1920 designed by Aage Rafn with extension from 1933 by Ole Jacobsen, garage building from 1949 and shed	
J. F. Willumsen House		Strandagervej 28, 2900 Hellerup	1907	Home and studio of Jens Ferdinand Willumsen, completed in 1907 to his own design	
Lundevangsvej 12		Lundevangsvej 12, 2900 Hellerup	1907	House from 1907 designed by Carl Brummer	
