= Gefion and Gylfe =

Listed buildings in Copenhagen

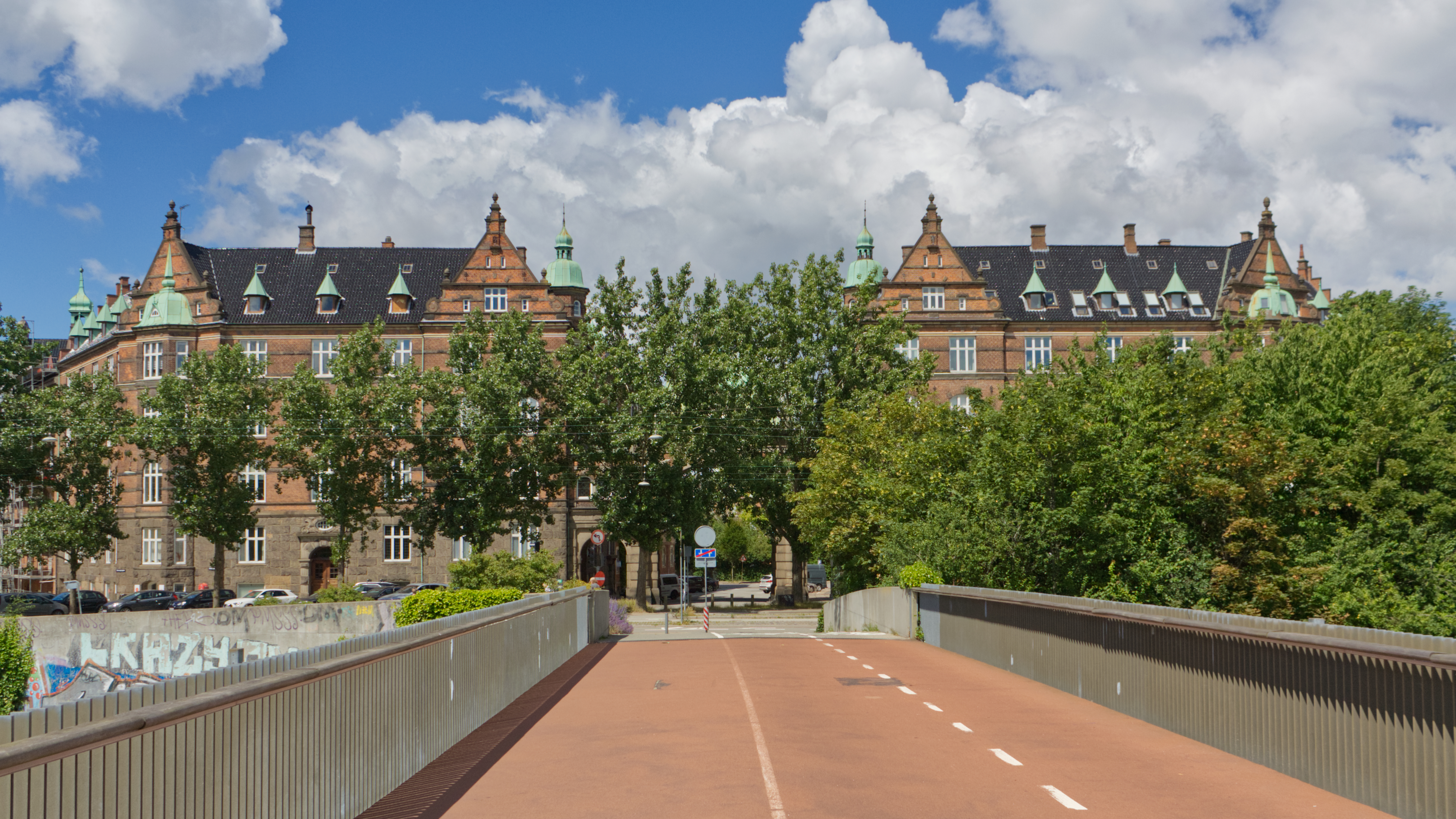
- Gefion and Gylfe in 2022.
- Interactive map of the Gefion and Gylfe area

General information
- Architectural style: National Romanticism / Renaissance Revival
- Location: Copenhagen, Denmark
- Coordinates: 55°41′44″N 12°35′24″E
- Completed: 1902

Design and construction
- Architect: Philip Smidth

Gefion and Gylfe, situated at Østbanegade 19–21, between Stavangergade and Fridtjof Nansens Plads, is a pair of National Romantic high-end apartment buildings attached to each other by an archway across Mandalsgade in the Østerbro district of Copenhagen, Denmark. The symmetrical building complex was originally located in the axis of the Langelinie Bridge, an Asger Ostenfeld-designed steel bridge spanning the railway tracks just north of Østerport station, now replaced by a bicycle and footbridge. The two buildings were individually listed in the Danish registry of protected buildings and places in 2000. The Irish embassy is based in Gylfe (No. 21). In Norse mythology, Gefion is the goddess who plouged Zealand out of Sweden. Gylfe is the king who challenged her to do so.

== History ==
The building complex stands on the former glacis in front of Kastellet. The layout of Østbanegade and its side streets was decided in connection with the plans for the new Coast Line in 1893. Østbanegade was named after Østbanegården (English: The East Station), now Østerport station, which opened in 1897. Most of the side streets were named after Norwegian towns. Mandalsgade (named after Mandal) was originally called Frederikshaldsgade (after Frederiksdal). The street was located opposite the no longer existing Langelinie Bridge. The bridge was constructed in 1890–92 to designs by Asger Ostenfeld and was necessary due to the construction of the Freeport of Copenhagen. The plan was to connect Mandalsgade (Frederiksdalsgade) to Livjægergade to provide a direct connection between Østbanegade and Classensgade but the section from Kristianiagade to Kastelsvej was never realized.

The Gefion and Gylfe building complex was constructed in 1900–02 to designs by Philip Smidth. The names Gefion and Gylfe were inspired by some of the local street names. Frithjof Nansens Plads was thus originally called Gylfesgade (Gylfe Street). Gefionsgade (Gefion Street) is the name of a small side street to Frithjof Nansens Plads. Gefion has also served as inspiration for the Gefion Fountain on the other side of the railway tracks.

The building complex was at some point acquired by Harald Simonsen. His daughter Erna Hamilton resided in one of the apartments in Gylfe in the 1970s.

The Langelinie Bridge was closed to traffic in 1987. It was dismantled and put on storage in 1992 but never reconstructed. The present bicycle and footbridge was opened in 2007.

== Gallery ==
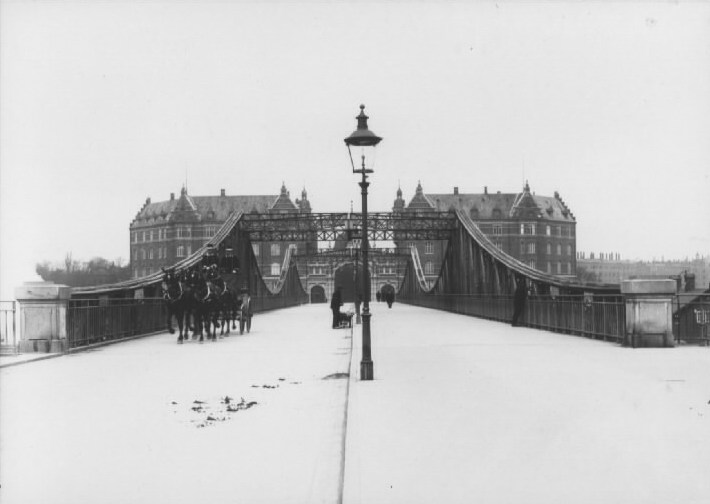
The Langelinie Bridge with Gefion and Gylfe in the background.

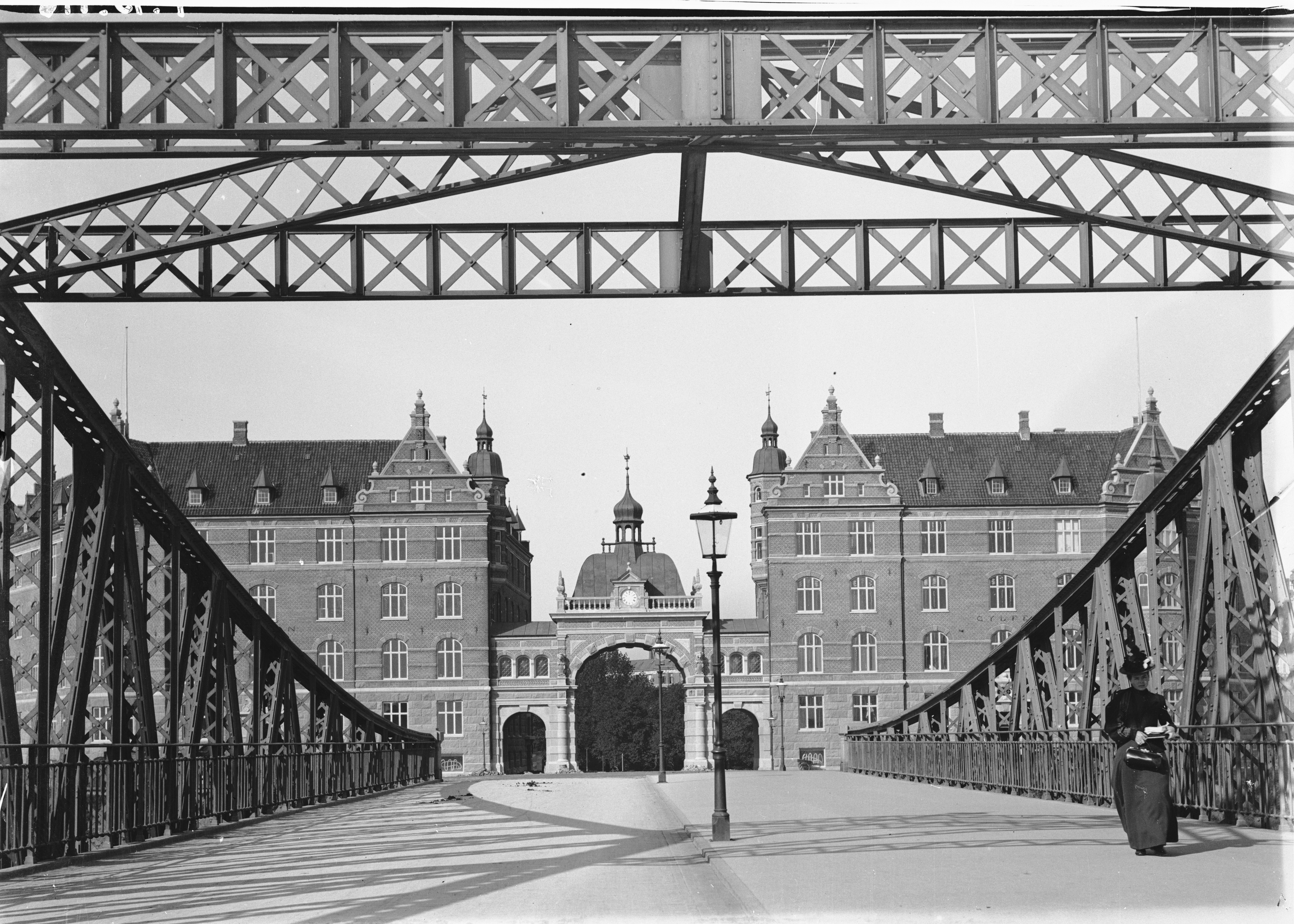
Gefion and Gylfe photographed by Fritz Theodor Benzen in the 1900s.

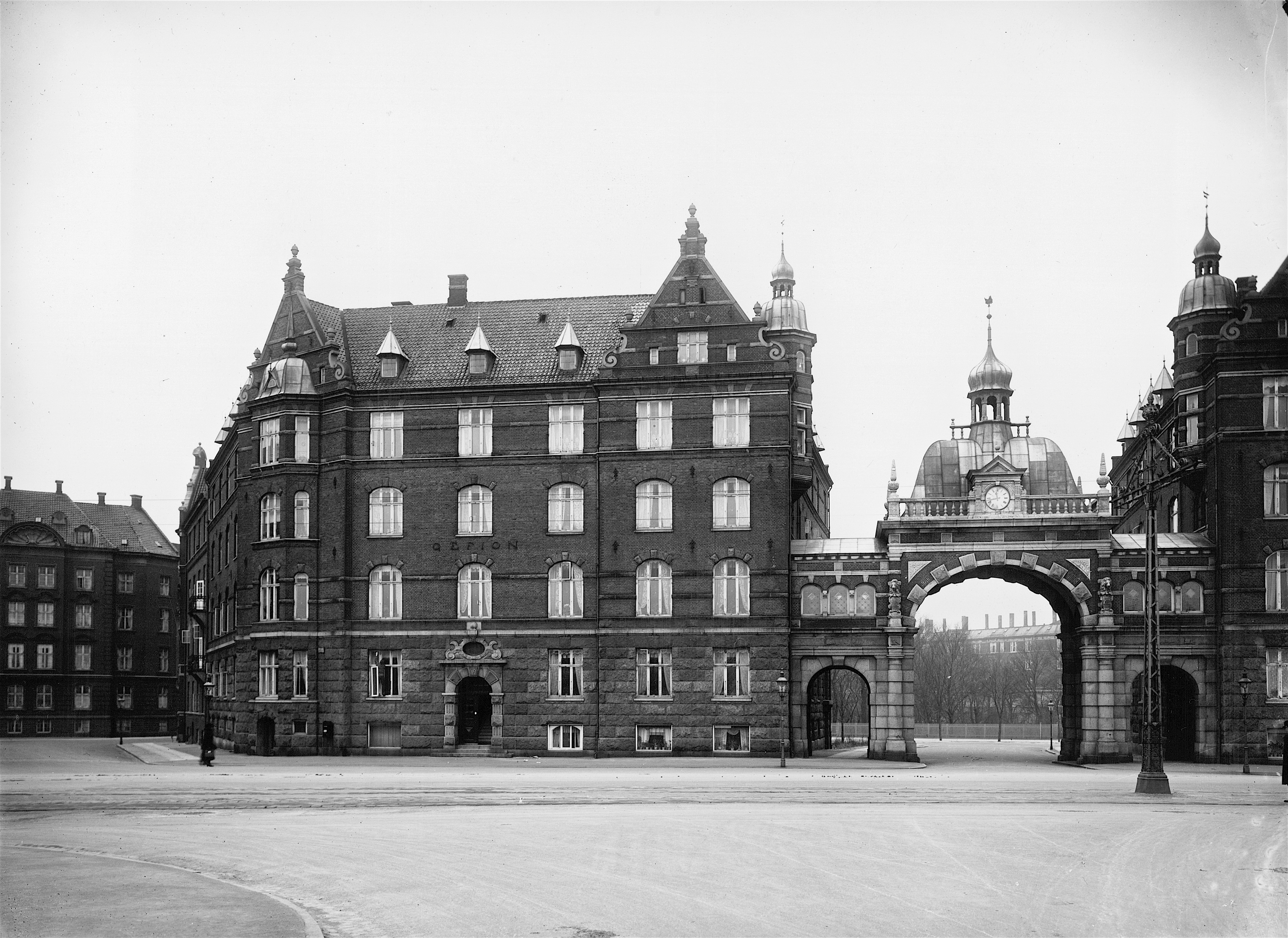
Gefion photographed by Peter Elfelt in 1922.

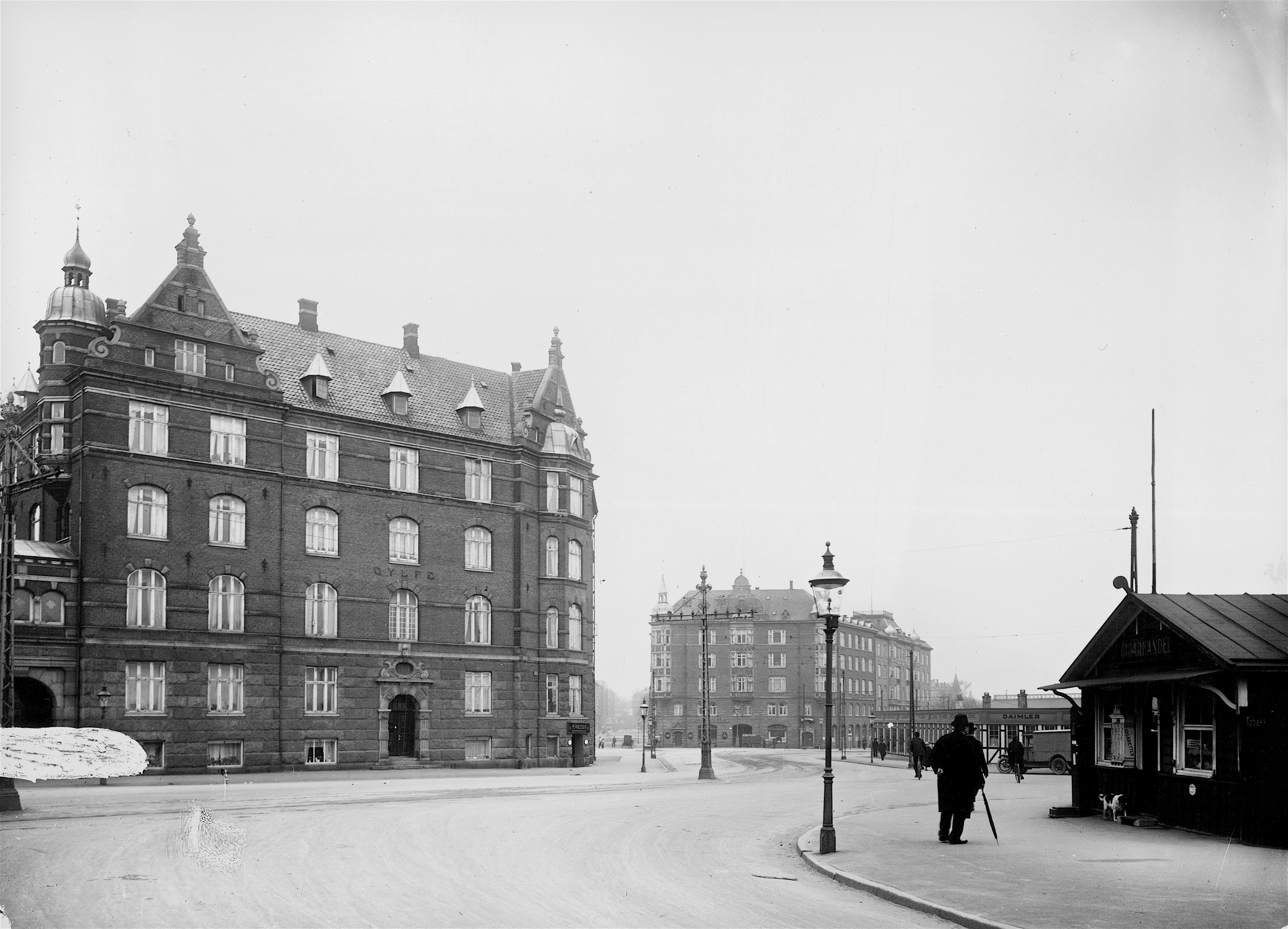
Gylfe photographed by Petert Elfelt in 1922.

== Architecture ==
Gegion and Gulfe are constructed to almost identical but mirrored National Romantic designs. The two buildings are both constructed in brick with four storeys over a walk-out basement and have a five-bays-long principal facade towards Østbanegade as well as a chamfered corner with a central bay window. A difference between the two buildings is that Gylfe (No. 21) has a just three-bays-long secondary facade towards Fridtjof Nansens Plads whereas Gefion (No. 19) has a five-bays-long secondary facade towards Stavangergade. The front side of the buildings are constructed in red brick, faced with granite rustication on the ground floor and the exposed part of the basement and with bands of granite and cement on the upper undressed part. The two main entrances are accented with decorative granite portals with an oval window and the house number written in gold on the keystone above the arched doorway. The double doors are executed in dark wood with rectangular windows and, topped by an arched transom window. The roofs are clad in black-glazed tile and features two gabled wall dormers towards Østbanegade, a small domed tower towards Mandalsgade and a series of dormer windows with diminutive copper spires.

The central archway consists of a large arch across the traffic lanes flaned by two smaller arches spanning the two pavements. The large central arch is topped by a dome-like roof surrounded by four pinackles. The interior of the arches have cross aulted white ceilings with red details.

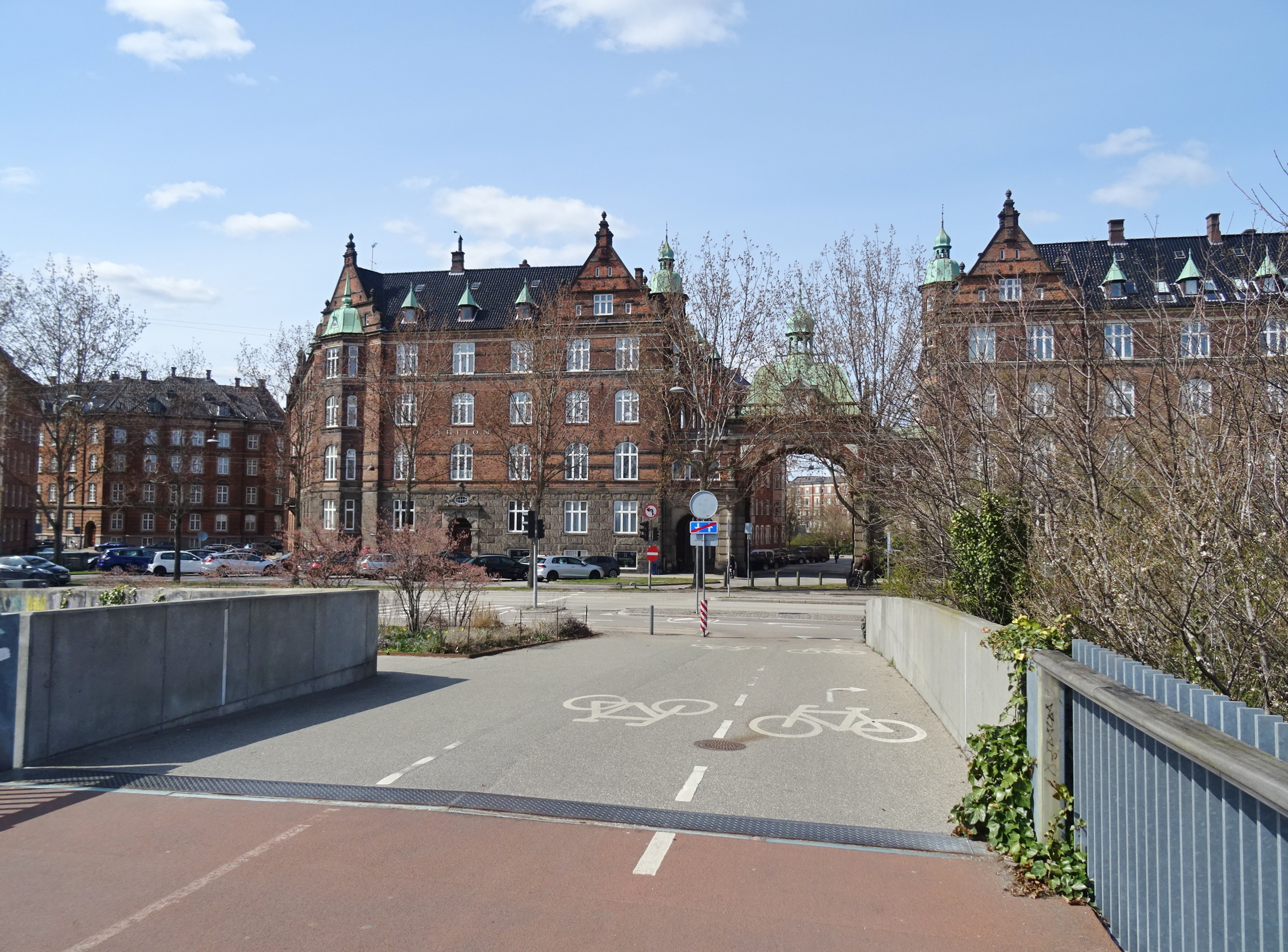

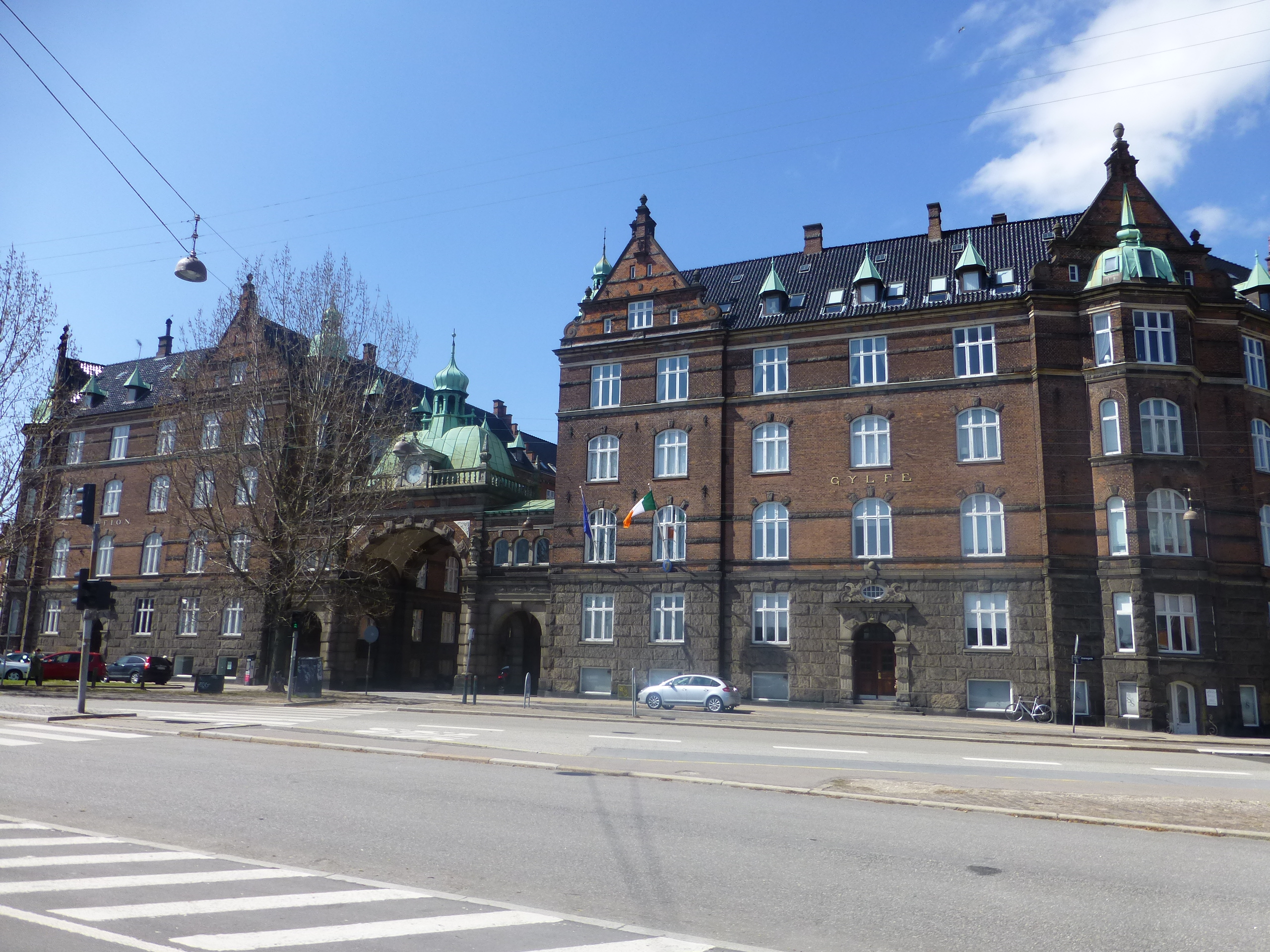

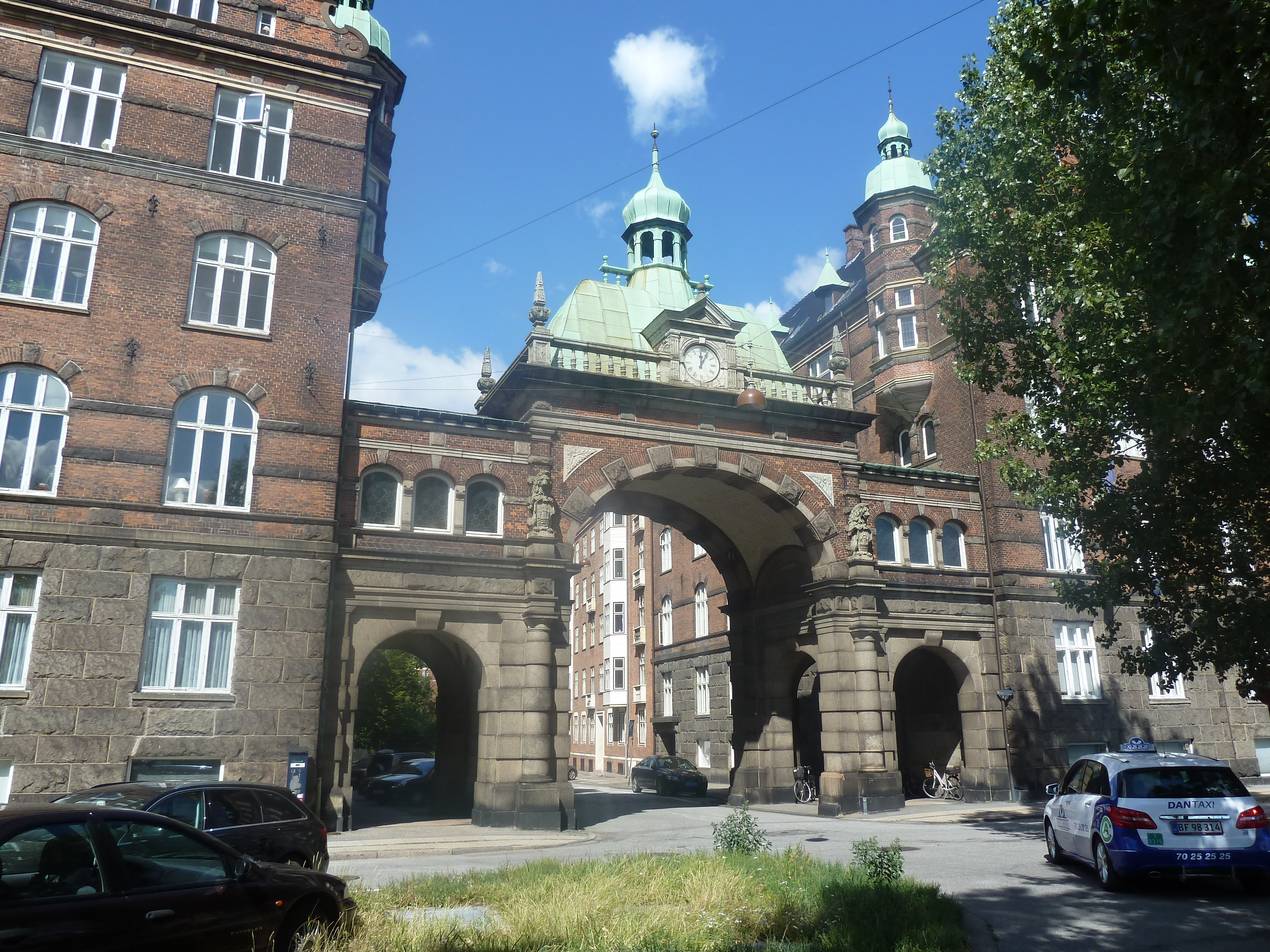
The central archway

== Today ==
The Irish embassy is based in Gylfe (No. 21). Simonsen og Levring A/S is also based at No. 21. The company was co-founded by Finn Harald Simonsen, a grandson of Harald Simonsen and a nephew of Erna Hamilton. Gefion is owned by Erna Hamiltons Legat for Videnskab og Kunst, a foundation created by Erna Gamilton.

== Cultural references ==
Gefion (Østbanegade 19) was used as a location in the 1963 film Hvis lille pige er du?.

== See also ==
- Søtorvet
