= Philip Smidth =

Danish architect (1855–1938)

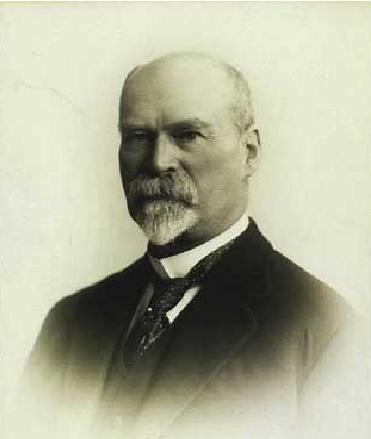
- Philip Smidth2 photographed in 1918 by Julie Laurberg
- Born: 3 May 1855; Rønnede, Denmark
- Died: 21 June 1938 (aged 83)
- Occupation: Architect

Signature
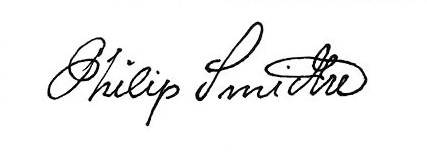

Philip Smidth (3 May 1855 – 21 June 1938) was a prolific Danish architect in the late 19th and early 20th centuries. His works included, commercial properties, high-end apartment buildings, hotels and hospitals. He worked in the Historicist style. Two of his works, Liselund Ny Slot on the island of Møn and Gefion and Gylfe in Copenhagen, have been listed by the Danish Heritage Agency.

== Biography ==
Philip Smidth was born in Rønnede to the south of Copenhagen. His parents were, kammerråd and later justitsråd Jens Frederik Julius Beck Smidth and Anna Henriette née Høyer. After passing his preliminary exams, he apprenticed as a carpenter and then studied at the Rechnical Society's School and attending C. V. Nielsens Regneskole. He enrolled at the Royal Danish Academy of Fine Arts in January 1873 and graduated in March 1882.

== Selected projects ==
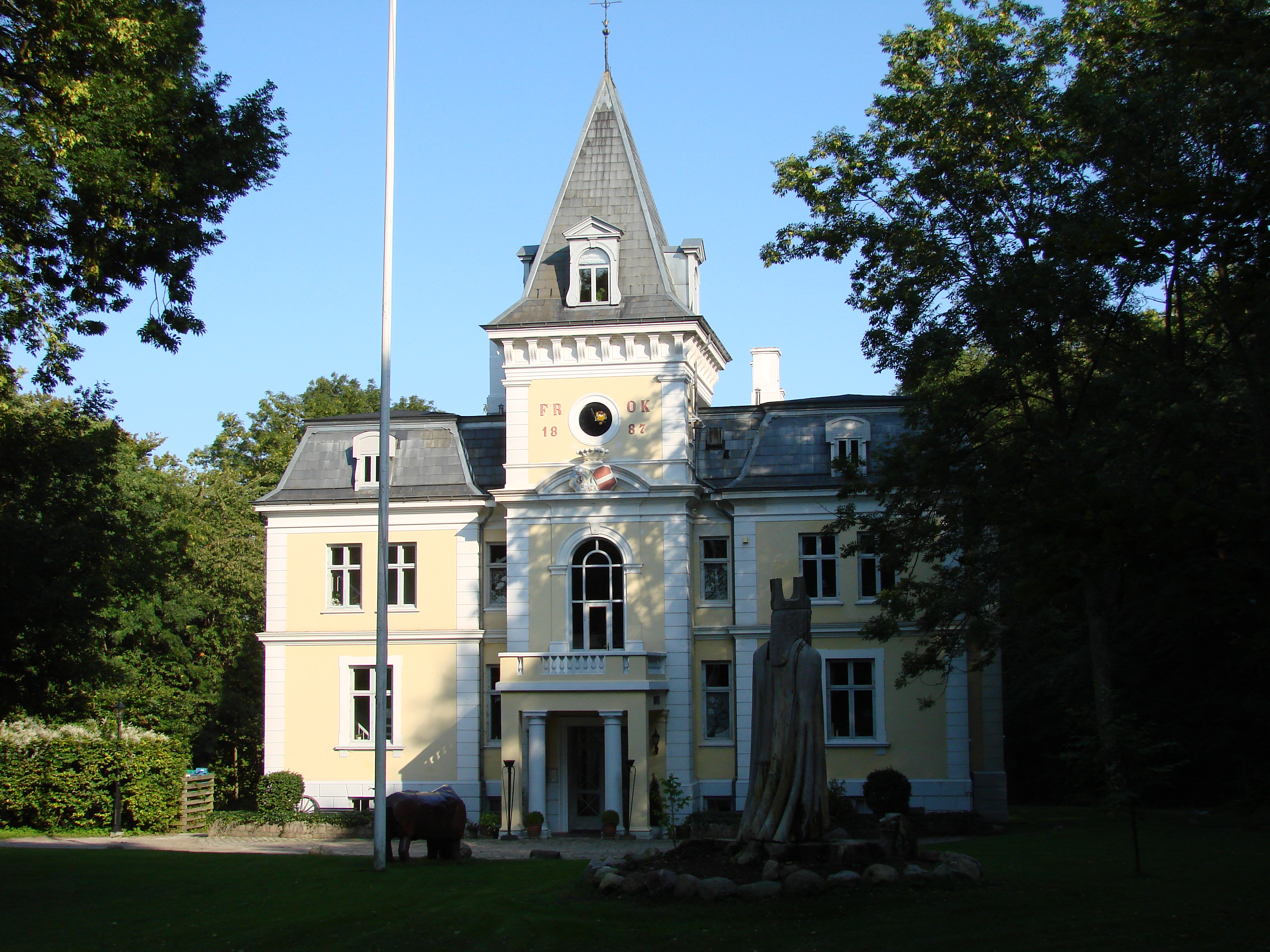
Liselund Ny Slot, Møn

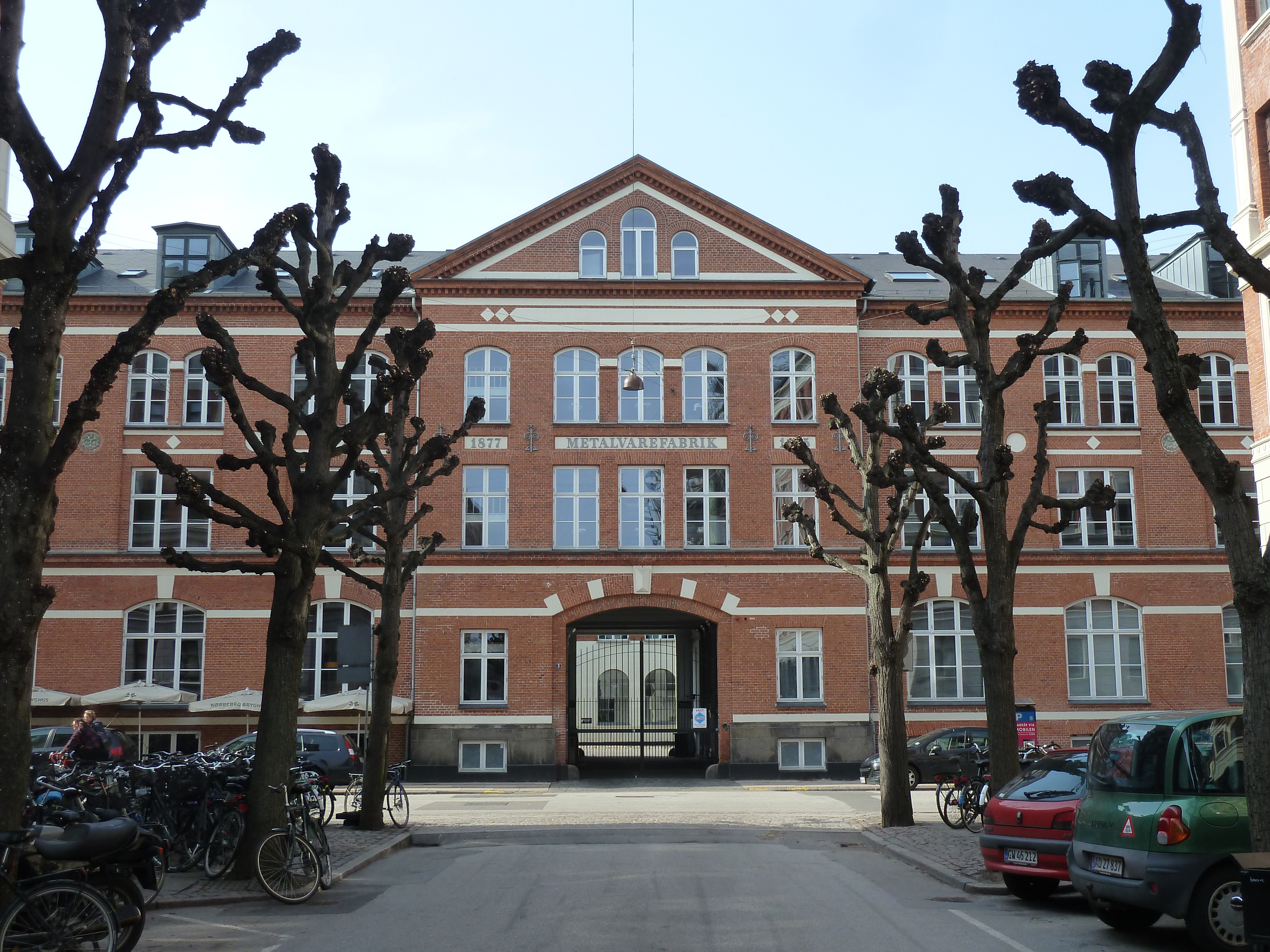
Ryesgade 3, Copenhagen

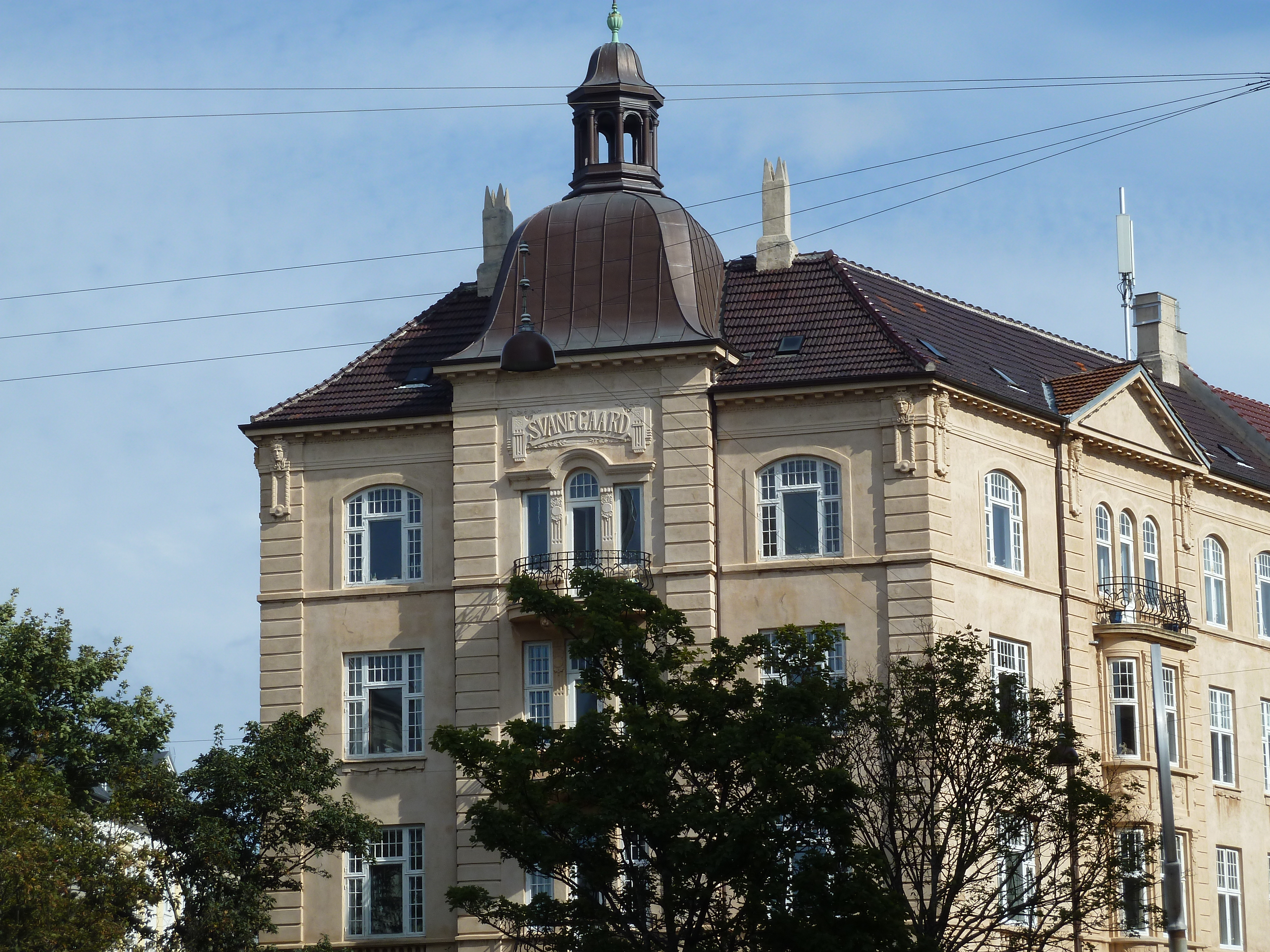
Svanegaard

- Kastrup Church, Kastrup, Copenhagen (1883–84)
- Schneekloths Skole, Værnedamsvej 13A, Frederiksberg, Copenhagen (1885)
- Liselund Ny Slot, Møn (1886–87, listed in 1990)
- Nørrebrogade 34, Copenhagen (1889–90)
- Vesterbrogade 48/Bagerstræde 2, Copenhagen (1891, 1900)
- Holckenhus, Dantes Plads 33/Ny Vestergade 16-18/Vester Voldgade 86-90/Stormgade 35, Copenhagen (1891–93)
- Goldschmidt og hustrus stiftelse (expansion), Ryesgade 31A-D, Copenhagen (1891–93)
- Kastrup Glasværk (now Teknikernes Hus), Nørre Voldgade 12, Copenhagen (1892)
- Søro, Sankt Hans Gade 2/Sortedam Dossering 23, Copenhagen (1892)
- Stubbekøbing Technical School, Stubbekøbing (1894)
- Factory for H. V. Christensen & Cos Metalvarefabrik, Ryesgade 3, Copenhagen (1895–96
- H. C. Andersens Boulevard 41-43, Copenhagen (1896–98)
- Gammel Kongevej 108, Frederiksberg, Copenhagen (1898–99)
- Adolph Steens Allé 7-9/Worsaasvej 6/H.C. Østeds Vej 42-46, Frederiksberg, Copenhagen (1897)
- Smallegade 22-24/Hospitalsvej 1A, Frederiksberg, Copenhagen (1898)
- H. C. Ørsteds Vej 71-73/Åboulevard 31, Frederiksberg, Copenhagen (1899)
- Gamma-Delta-Epsilon, Strandboulevarden 3/Arendalsgade 1-3/Hardangergade 2-4/Fridtjof Nansens Plads 5m Copenhagen (1899-1902, with Theodor Hirth)
- Palægade 6-8/Store Kongensgade 26-30, Copenhagen (1900–02)
- Gefion and Gylfe, Østbanegade 19-21m Copenhagen (1901–02, listed)
- Hvælvingen, Nikolaj Plads 26/Store Kirkestræde 2, Copenhagen (1902, withLeuning Borch )
- Store Kongensgade 26 and 30, Copenhagen (1902)
- Stavangergade 4, Copenhagen (1902)
- Svanegaard, Sankt Jakobs Plads 6 (1904)
- Dronningensgade 60, Christianshavn, Copenhagen (1904, demolished)
- Sankt Thomas, Frederiksberg Allé 26/Sankt Thomas Allé 1-9, Frederiksberg, Copenhagen (1904–05)
- Gammel Kongevej 114, Frederiksberg, Copenhagen (1905)
- Stavangergade 6, Copenhagen (1907)
- Store Jacobsborg, Østerbrogade 110-112, Copenhagen (1907)
- Jagtvej 22, 26, 56, 80 og 189m Copenhagen (1912)
- Lille Torvegade 2-14, Christianshavn, Copenhagen (1912, demolished)
- Manøgade 14, Copenhagen (1914)
- Brødrene Andersen, Østergade 7/Lille Kongensgade 8-10, Copenhagen (1914–16)
- Bredgade 6/Store Strandstræde 9-11, Copenhagen (1916–17)
- Adaption of Hotel d'Angleterre, Kongens Nytorv, Copenhagen (1915–16, with Nicolai Hansen after fire)
