= Ehlersvej 17 =

Building in Copenhagen, Denmark

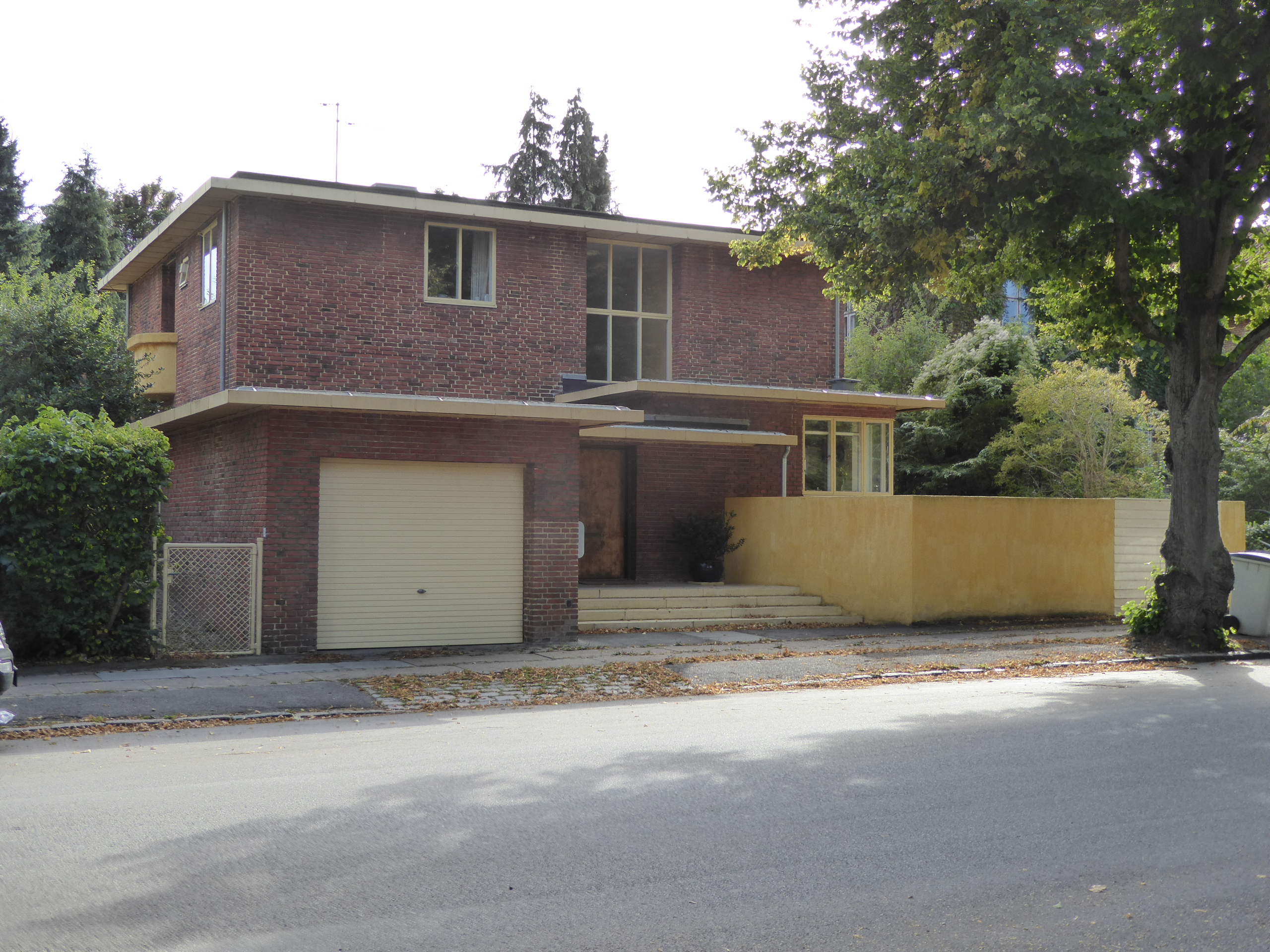
- Interactive map of the Ehlersvej 17 area

General information
- Location: Hellerup, Copenhagen, Ehlersvej 17, 2900 Hellerup, Denmark
- Coordinates: 55°43′41.23″N 12°34′17.98″E
- Construction started: 1930–31

Design and construction
- Architect: Frits Schlegel

Ehlersvej 17 is a functionalist house designed by Frits Schlegel and situated on Ehlersvej in the Østerbro district of Copenhagen, Denmark. It was listed in the Danish registry of protected buildings and places in 2001.

== History ==
Ehlersvej was created in 1918. The land along the road was subsequently sold off in lots by C. L. Ibsen. The property Ehlersvej 17 was acquired by Oscar Alfred Borum (1894–1984). In 1930, he charged Frits Schlegel with the design of a house. It was completed the following year.

Borum served as acting judge at Københavns Byret and Østre Landsret in 1928–1930. In 1930, he was appointed as Professor of Law at the University of Copenhagen.

The building was listed in the Danish registry of protected buildings and places by the Danish Heritage Agency on 26 September 2001.

== Architecture ==
Ehlersvej 7 is a two-storey villa constructed in red brick with yellow-painted details. The windows have yellow painted steel frames. A perpendicular garage and the attached walls towards the garden are also comprised by the heritage listing. In around 1934, Schlegel was charged with theadaption of an open pergola towards the garden into a closed winter garden. This had to some extent compromised the original concept with a closed facade towards the street and a transparent one towards the garden.
