= Glacisgården =

Building in Copenhagen, Denmark

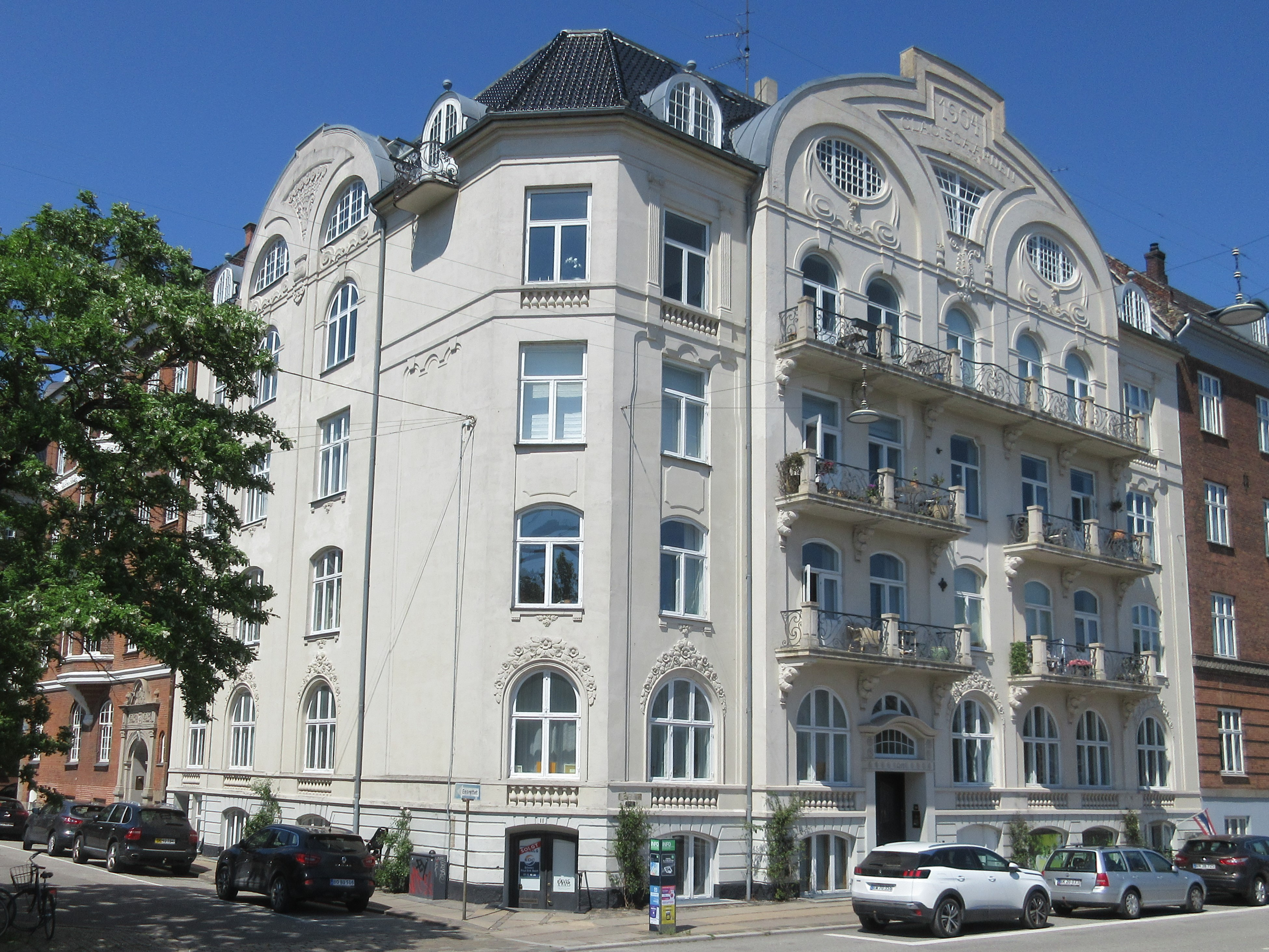
- The building seen from the footbridge across the railway tracks.
- Interactive map of the Glacisgården area

General information
- Location: Copenhagen, Denmark
- Coordinates: 55°41′39.43″N 12°35′20.3″E
- Construction started: 1903
- Completed: 1904

Design and construction
- Architect: Aage Langeland-Mathiesen

Glacisgården is a Jugendstil-style building located at Østbanegade 11 in the Østerbro district of Copenhagen, Denmark. It was listed in the Danish registry of protected buildings and places in 2001.

== History ==
Glacisgården takes its name after the glacis outside Copenhagen's East Rampart which was located at the site until the second half of the 19th century. The building was constructed in 1903-04 to design by Aage Langeland-Mathiesen.

== Architecture ==
The building is designed in the Jugendstil. The design is strongly inspired by an Arthur Meinig building from 1898 at József Attila utca 8 in Budapest.
