= Edvard Jünger =

Danish precision mechanic and instrument maker

Frederik Gottlieb Edvard Jünger (19 April 1823 – 21 October 1899) was a Danish precision mechanic and instrument maker. His company was taken over by Christopher Peter Jürgensen in 1869. In the 1870s and early 1880s, he was the manager of Holmegaard Glass Factory near Næstved.

== Early life and education ==
Jünger was born in Holbæk. He initially worked as a clerk at various offices, most lately at the Bregentved estate. He was, however, interested in the technical sciences and his talent for mechanics caught the attention of Hans Christian Ørsted. Ørsted helped him obtain a grant from count F. M. Knuth which enabled him to enroll at the College of Advanced Technology. His education also brought him to Munich and Vienna.

== Career ==
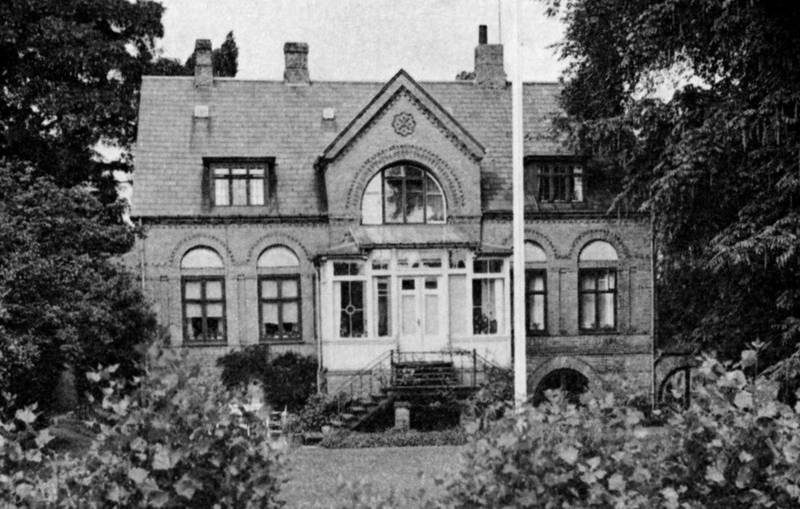
The house on Sortedam Dossering (No. 37) where Jürger lived and worked.

Back in Denmark, he settled as an instrument maker in Copenhagen in 1852. He produced technical instruments for the College of Advanced Technology and Sorø Academy as well as distance measurement devices for the Danish army and navy and had also many customers abroad. Júrger lived on Sortedam Dossering No. 37 and worked out of his basement. He was involved in the development of the Hansen Writing Ball in 1865. He spent several years working on an equatorial mount for Østervold Observatory and later a similar instrument for Lund Observatory in Sweden. In 1867, he was appointed to university mechanic (universitetsmekanikus) at University of Copenhagen and the following year he received the title of professor.

== Late life ==
Jünger's work compromised his vision and in 1869 he ceded his company to his employee Christopher Peter Jürgensen. He went abroad in 1869 and settled on a country estate in Steiermark. In 1873, he received an offer to take over the management of the Holmegaard Glass Factory and returned to Denmark, where he ran the company for 11 years. He spent his last years in Copenhagen and is buried at Solbjerg Cemetery.
