= Christianshvile =

Building in Østerbro, Copenhagen, Denmark

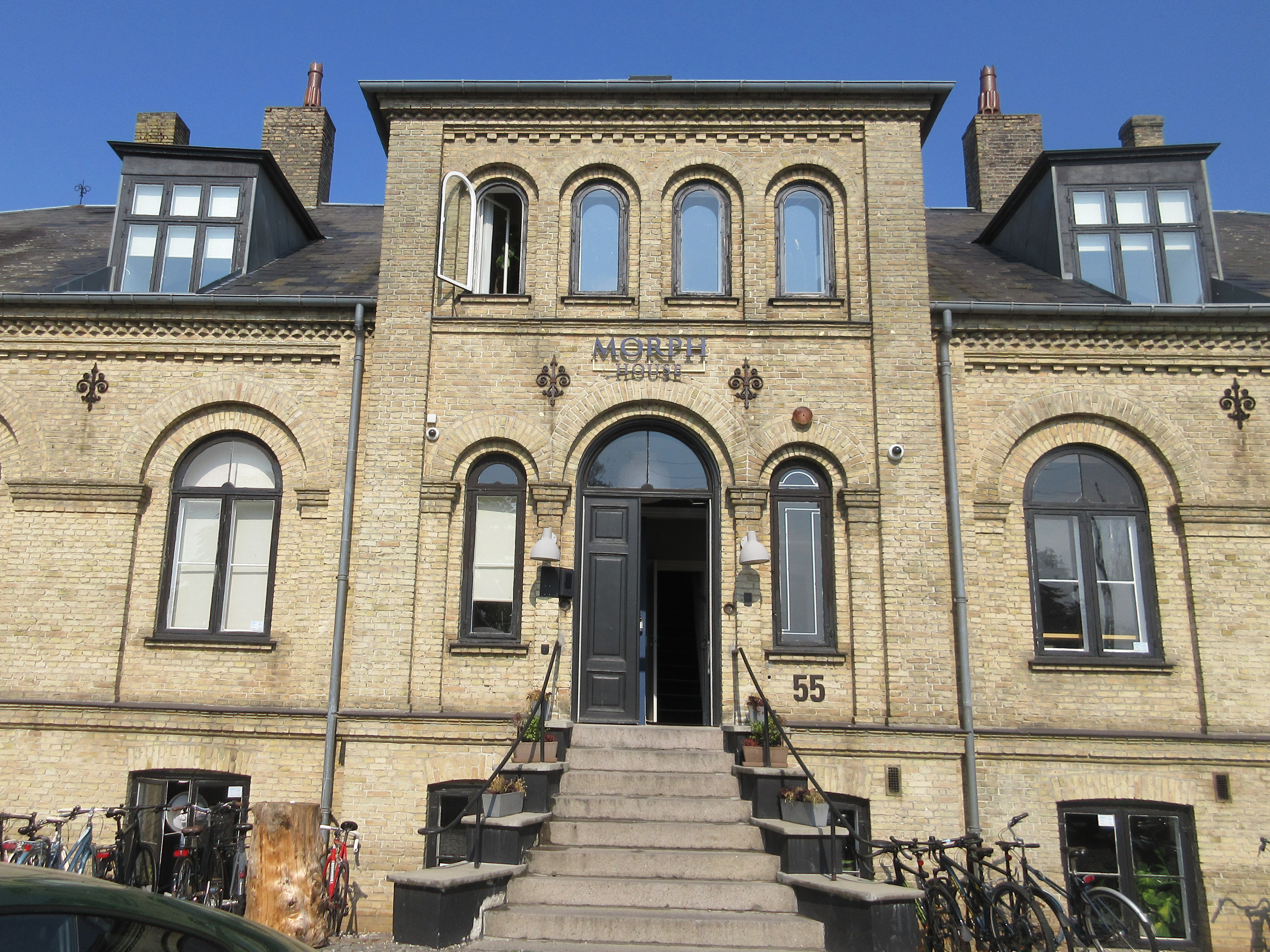
- Thott Mansion seen from the square
- Interactive map of the Christianshvile area

General information
- Location: Copenhagen, Denmark
- Coordinates: 55°41′34.62″N 12°34′12.32″E
- Completed: 1869

Design and construction
- Architect: Georg W. Møller

Christianshvile is a late 19th-century villa located at Sortedam Dossering 55 in the Østerbro district of Copenhagen, Denmark. The main building, a stable and a carriage house were listed on the Danish registry of protected buildings and places in 1980.

== History ==
The 11th Bleaching Pond Lot (later Blegdamsvej 82 and now Sortedams Dossering 55 and Ryesgade 48) of the 24 bleaching pond lots that lined the west side of Sortedam Lake was in around 1770 home to a ship sails factory owned by sailmaker Christian Brenøe (born c. 1734). Brenøe took over the deliveries of ship sails to the Royal Danish Dockyard at Nyholm when the ship sails factory at Wodroffsgaard ran into difficulties in the late 1780s. Brenøe was in 1805 succeeded by his son Peter Christian Brenøe (1770-1832) who was unable to continue his father's success. The factory was in 1914 sold to Adolph Christian Fibiger for 14,000 Danish rigsdaler and converted into a bleaching plant.

Master baker William Rubow acquired the property from Fibiger's widow in circa 1862 but sold it again to bookkeeper H. C. Hildebrandt. In 1964, Hildebrandt sold the property to former "French baker" Christian Nielsen. A couple of buildings from 1841 or earlier was at this point located on the land. Christian Nielsen wanted to use the property for the construction of a new starch factory. He was also planning to extract "ingredients for gluten bread" which were considered beneficial for people suffering from diabetes. In 1863, he charged Thorvald Sørensen (1849-1905), building inspector in Copenhagen's 2md district, with the design of a new factory building, a stable for six horses and a carriage house. Christian Nielsen had also charged Thorvald Sørensen with the design of a villa for his own use. He designed a two-storey villa with a tower-lke central projection with a puramidical roof and a five-sided appendix. The design shows inspiration from Johan Daniel Herholdt. The other buildings were constructed in 1865 but the villa was not realized. When Christian Nielsen finally got his villa in 1869, it was built to a new design by Georg W. Møller. The house was given the name "Christianshvile” ("Christian's Rest").

== Architecture ==
Georg Møller (1840–97) was a student of G. F Hetsch and worked as executing architect for J. D. Herholdt. He enrolled at the Royal Danish Academy of Fine Arts in 1855 but does not seem to have graduated. He collaborated with Wilhelm Dahlerup at the construction of Hotel d' Angleterre as well as Statens Museum for Kunst.

== Gallery ==
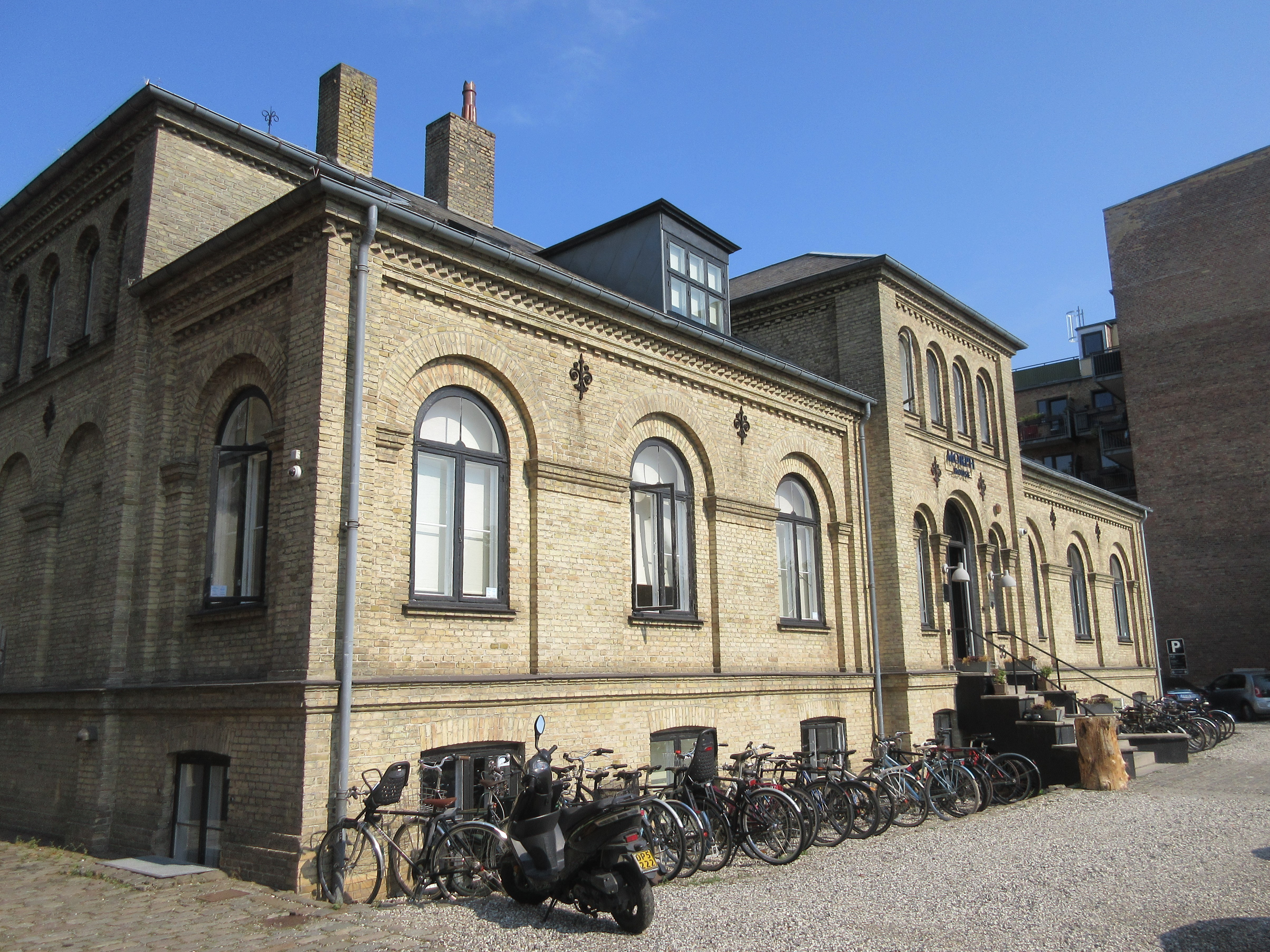

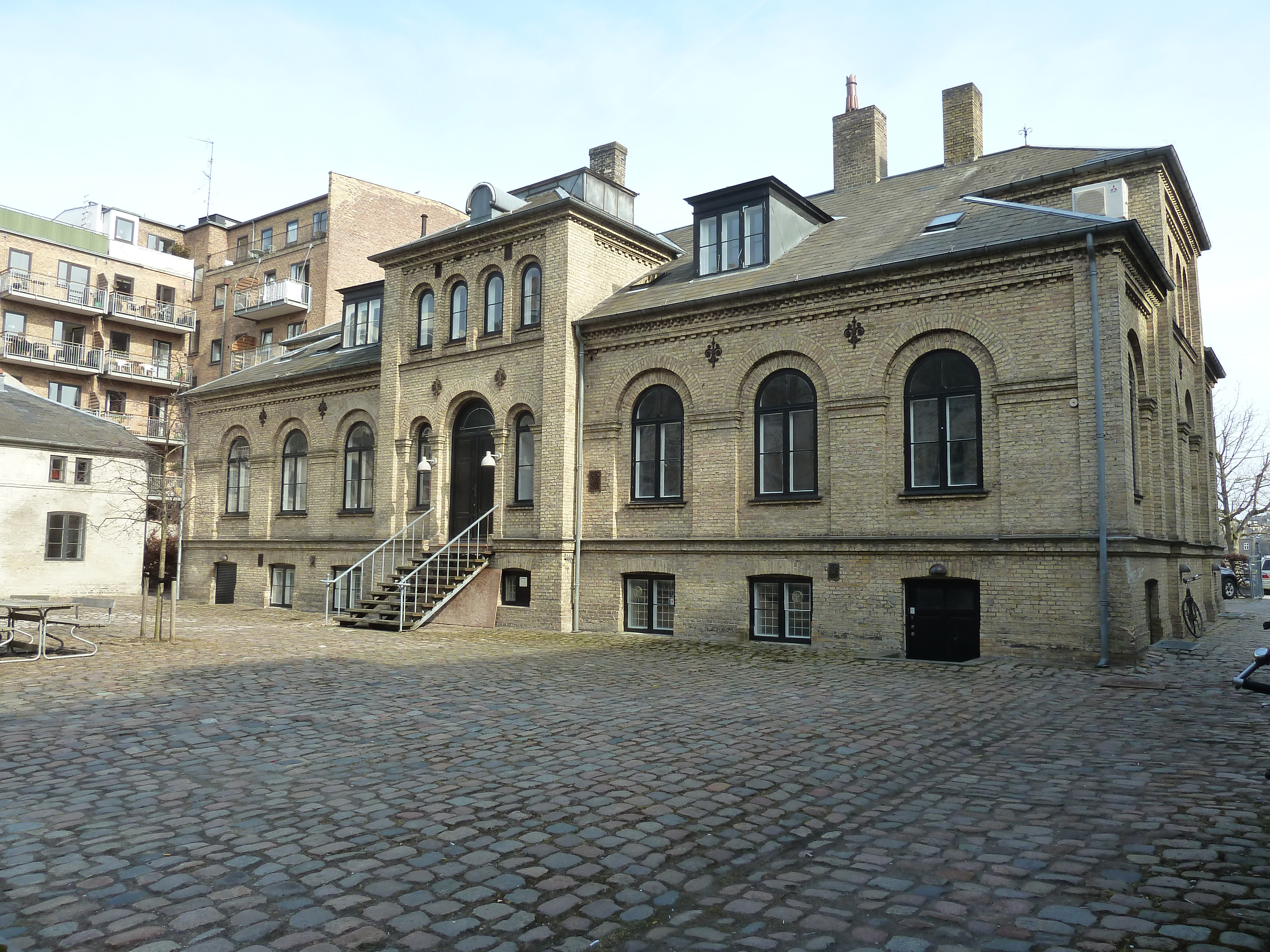
