= Christopher Peter Jürgensen =

Danish mechanician and instrument maker

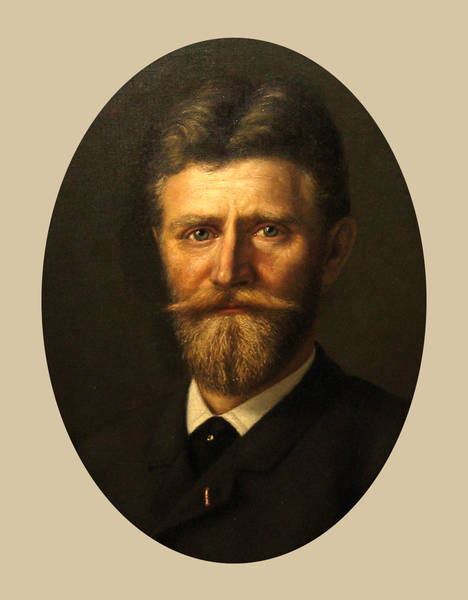
- Painting of C. O. Jürgensen
- Born: 30 October 1838; Gjesing, Randers Municipality
- Died: 26 December 1911 (aged 73); Charlottenlund, Copenhagen
- Occupation: Instrument maker

Christopher Peter Jürgensen (30 October 1838 – 26 December 1911) was a Danish precision mechanician and instrument maker.

== Early life and education ==
Jürgensen was born in Gesing near Randers. He was sent to Copenhagen at age 13 where he apprenticed at the instrument maker Julius Nissen's workshop in Købmagergade. He also attended the Technical Institute and in 1860 a scholarship enabled him to visit several leading workshops abroad.

== Career ==
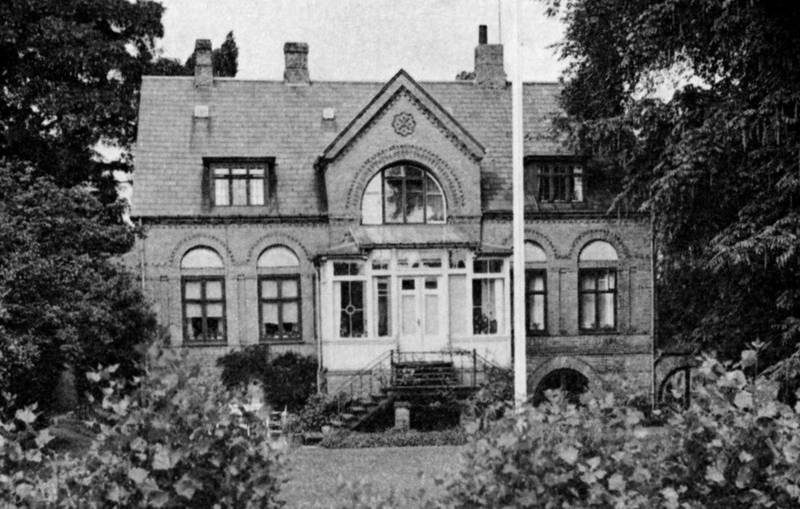
The house on Sortedam Dossering (No. 37) where Jürgensen's company was based.

Back in Denmark, he began to work for Edvard Jünger whose company he took over in 1869. The company was located at Sortedam Dossering (No. 37). Under his management the company developed into the leading manufacturer of optical, geodetical and nautical instruments in the Nordic countries. He collaborated with Rasmus Malling-Hansen on the development of the Writing Ball which he also manufactured. Jürgensen's instruments were noted for their precision. His customers included the Danish, Norwegian and Swedish armies and navies, Østervold Observatory in Copenhagen and scientists both in Denmark and abroad. With the growing significance of electricity in lighting in the 1880s, Jürgensen changed the profile of his company which was responsible for many large installations.

The company won a gold medal at the International Exposition of Electricity in Paris in 1881. Two new partners joined the company and it was converted into an aktieselskab in 1887. A new section for electric engines was established. It also moved to larger premises in Møllegade (No. 28). In 1890, in collaboration with Siemens & Halske, the company signed a contract for the construction of Copenhagen's first central power station in Adelgade. In the 1900s, the company came into economic difficulties and went bankrupt in 1906.

== See also ==
- C.P. Jürgensens mekaniske Etablissement
