= Østbanegade =

Street in Copenhagen, Denmark

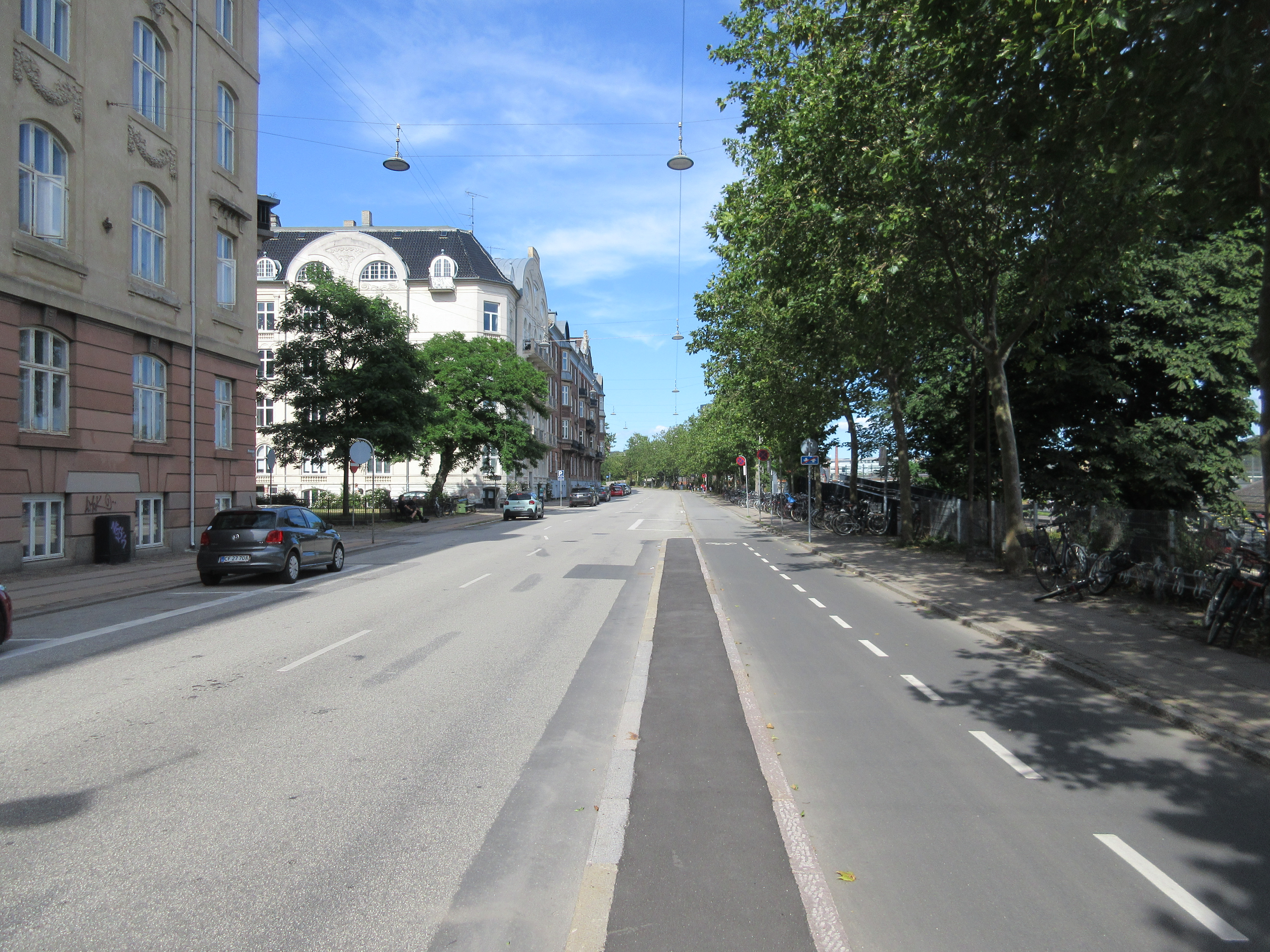
- Østbanegade with a glimpse of Glacisgården at the corner of Trondhjems Plads
- Interactive map of Østbanegade
- Length: 1,320 m (4,330 ft)
- Location: Copenhagen, Denmark
- Postal code: 2100
- Coordinates: 55°42′6.48″N 12°35′28.32″E

Østbanegade is a street in Copenhagen, Denmark. It begins at Østerport Station on Oslo Plads, and continues north along the west side of the railway tracks for about 2 kilometres to Aarhusgade, where an underpass connects the street to the other side of the railway line. A second underpass is situated at Nordre Frihavnsgade, just south of Nordhavn station, while a foot and cycle bridge is found at Mandalsgade near the beginning of the street.

Trondhjems Plads (English: Trondheim Square) is a garden square occupying a triangular space between Østbanegade and Trondhjemsgade.

== History ==
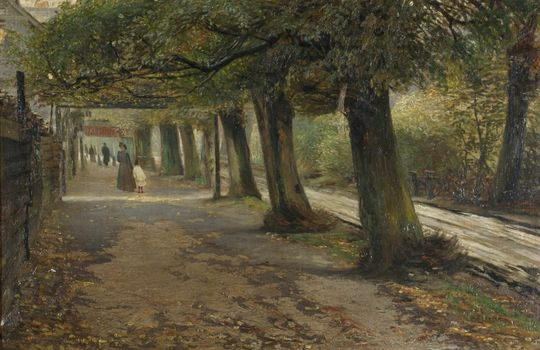
The Beach Promenade, now Østbanegade, 1896

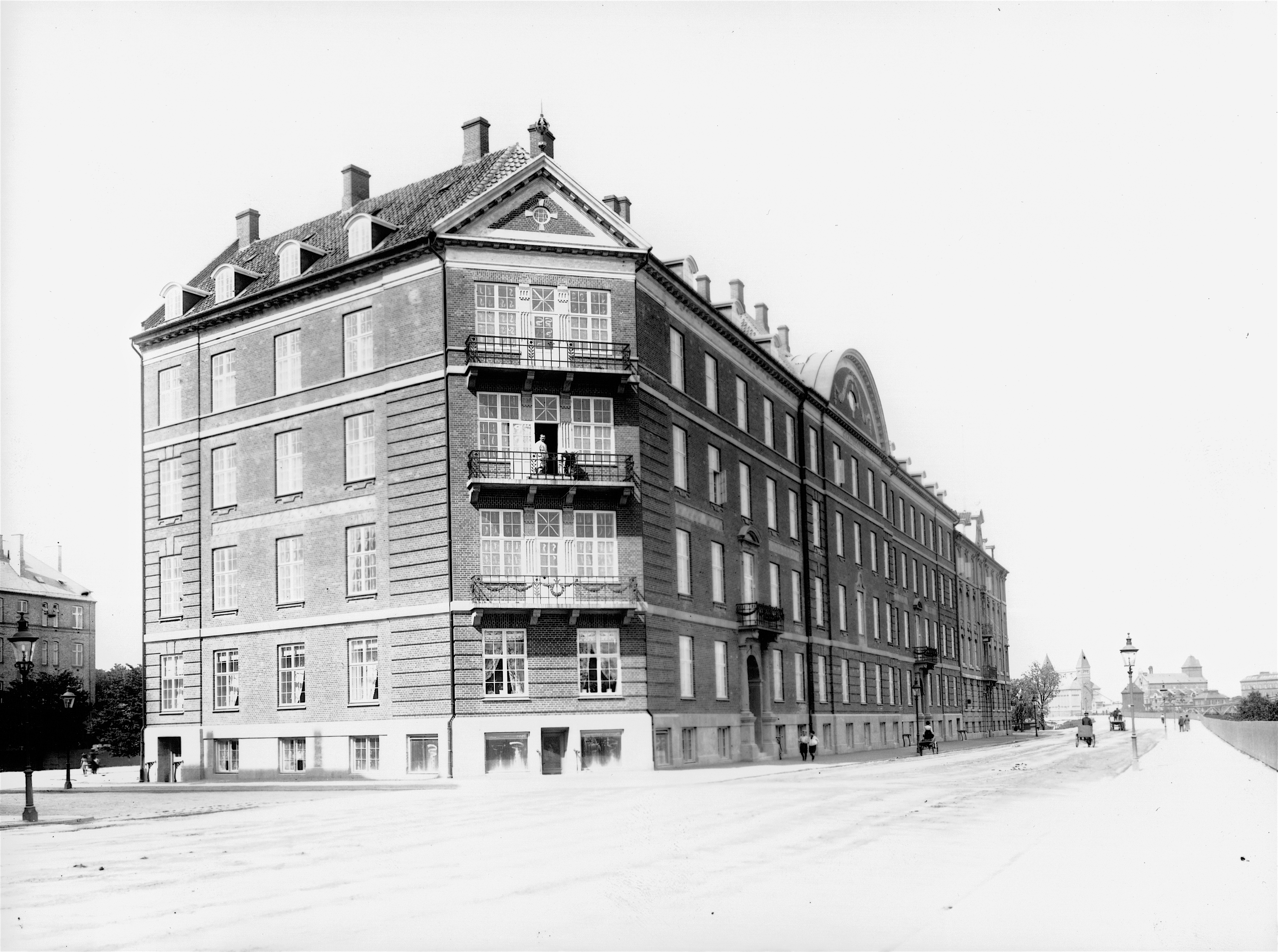
The block No. 5-9 seen in a photo by Peter Elfelt

The layout of the street was decided in connection with the plans for the new Coast Line in 1893. It was named after Østbanegården (English: The East Station), now Østerport station, which opened in 1897. The new Free Port was inaugurated on reclaimed land on the other side of the planned railway in November 1894. Construction of the street began in 1895. The street first crossed the former glacis outside Kastellet and then followed the old coast line to the Old Limery. Farther, it passed Øresund Chemical Factories, which had opened in 1859 after professor Hans Peter Jørgen and Julius Thomsen had established a process for manufacturing soda from cryolite, obtained from the west coast of Greenland. The plant existed until 1990.

== Notable buildings and residents ==
Glacispalæet (No. 1, literally "The Glacis Mansion") was built between 1900 and 1903 to a design by Andreas Clemmesen. It formerly served as headquarters of the engineering company Monberg & Thorsen. No. 5–7 (Glacispalais, 1903) and No. 9 are stately residential buildings. The street then passes Trondhjems Plads, a garden square which occupies a rectangular space between Østbanegade and Trondhjemsgade. It affords views of the rear side of Domus Medica. Glacisgården at No. 11 was designed by Aage Langelannd-Mathiesen and completed in 1904. It is a rare example of influence from Viennese Jugendstyle on Danish architecture. Gefion and Gylfe (No. 19 and 21) are two apartment buildings connected by an archway across Mandalsgade. They were completed in 1902 to a design by Philip Smidth.

Østerbro Fire Station (No. 99) was designed by Ludvig Fenger and completed in 1901.

== Public art ==
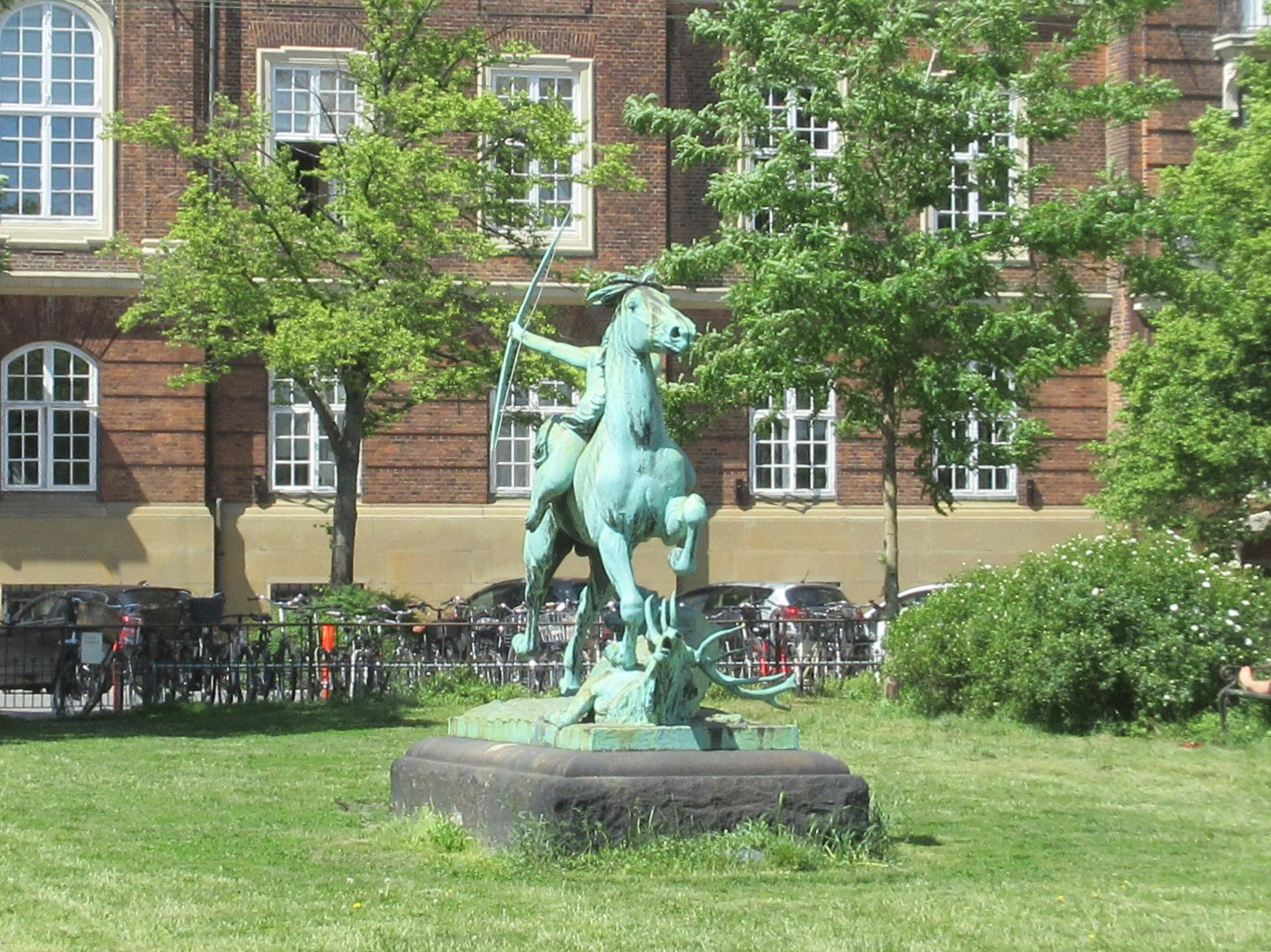
Diana on Horseback by Carl J. Bonnesen

In the garden complex on Trondhjems Plads is Carl Johan Bonnesen's equestrian statue Diana. It was installed on the square in 1909 as a gift from Carl Jacobsen. The underpass and outer wall of the raised railway at the end of Nordre Frihavnsgade are decorated with Ib Spang Olsen's illustrations from his childhood memoirs from Østerbro.

== Transport ==
The S-train stations Østerport station and Nordhavn station are located on the street. Østerport Station will also be the site of a station on the City Circle Line of the Copenhagen Metro.

== Image gallery ==
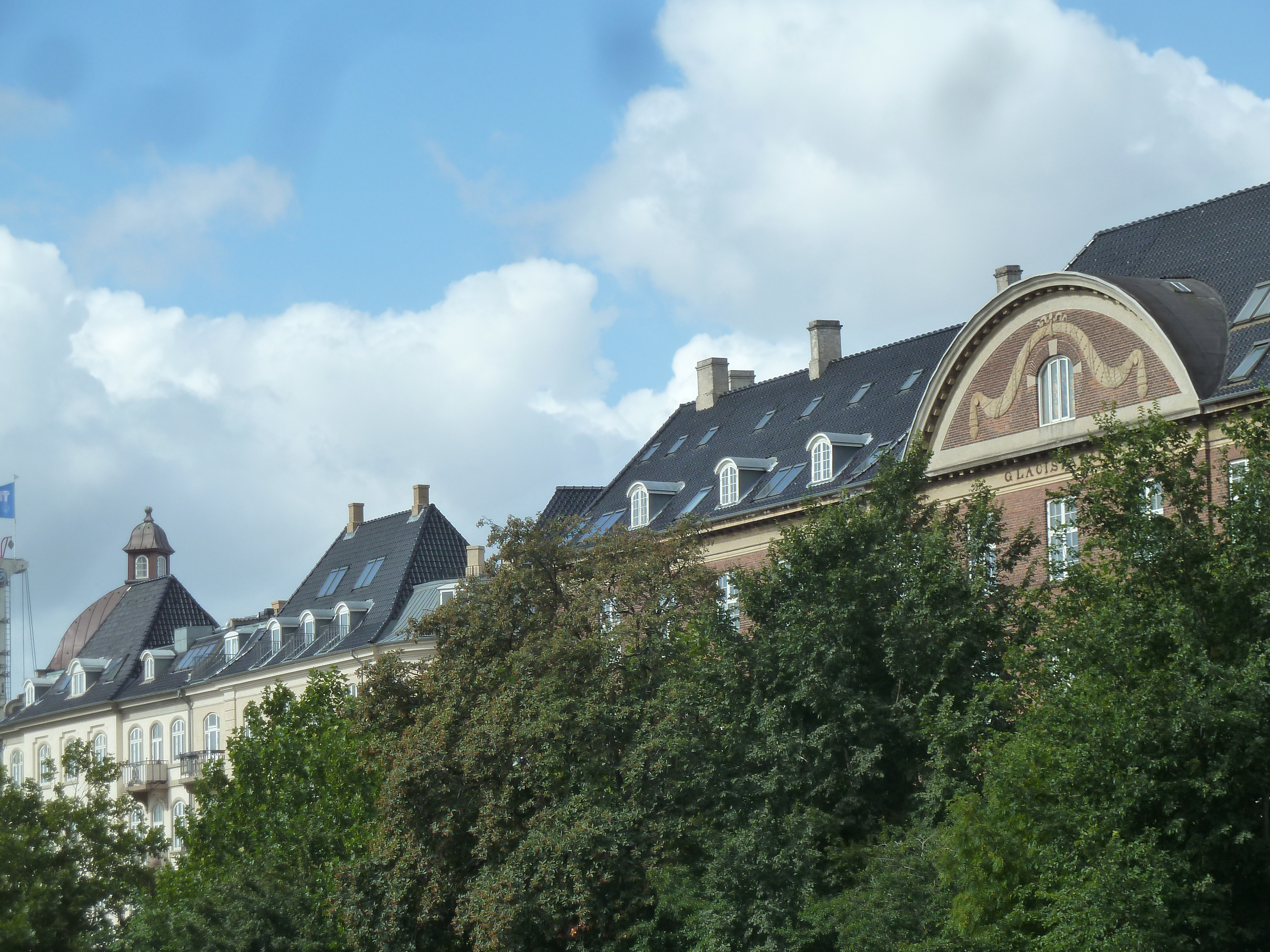
First part of the street

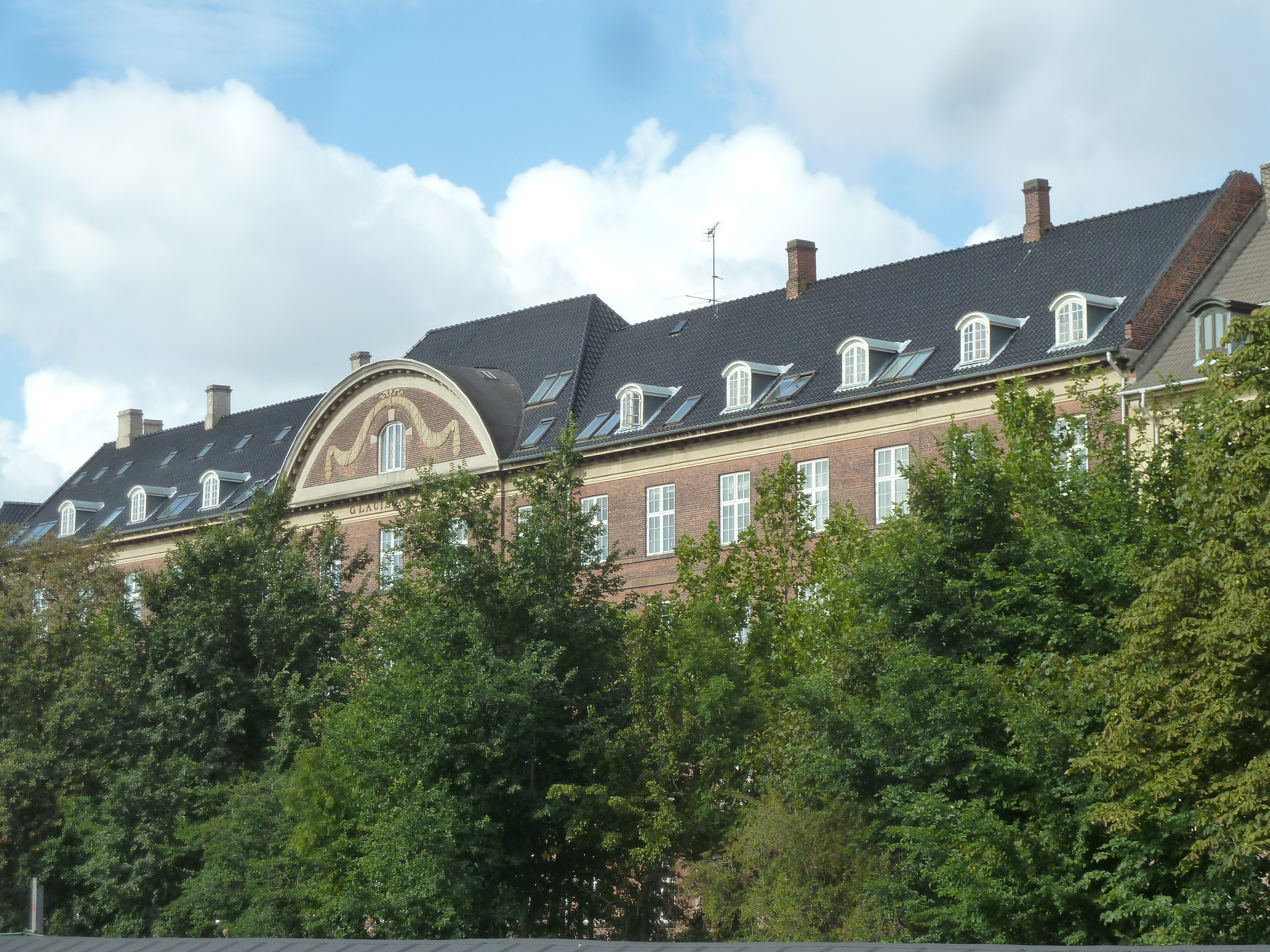

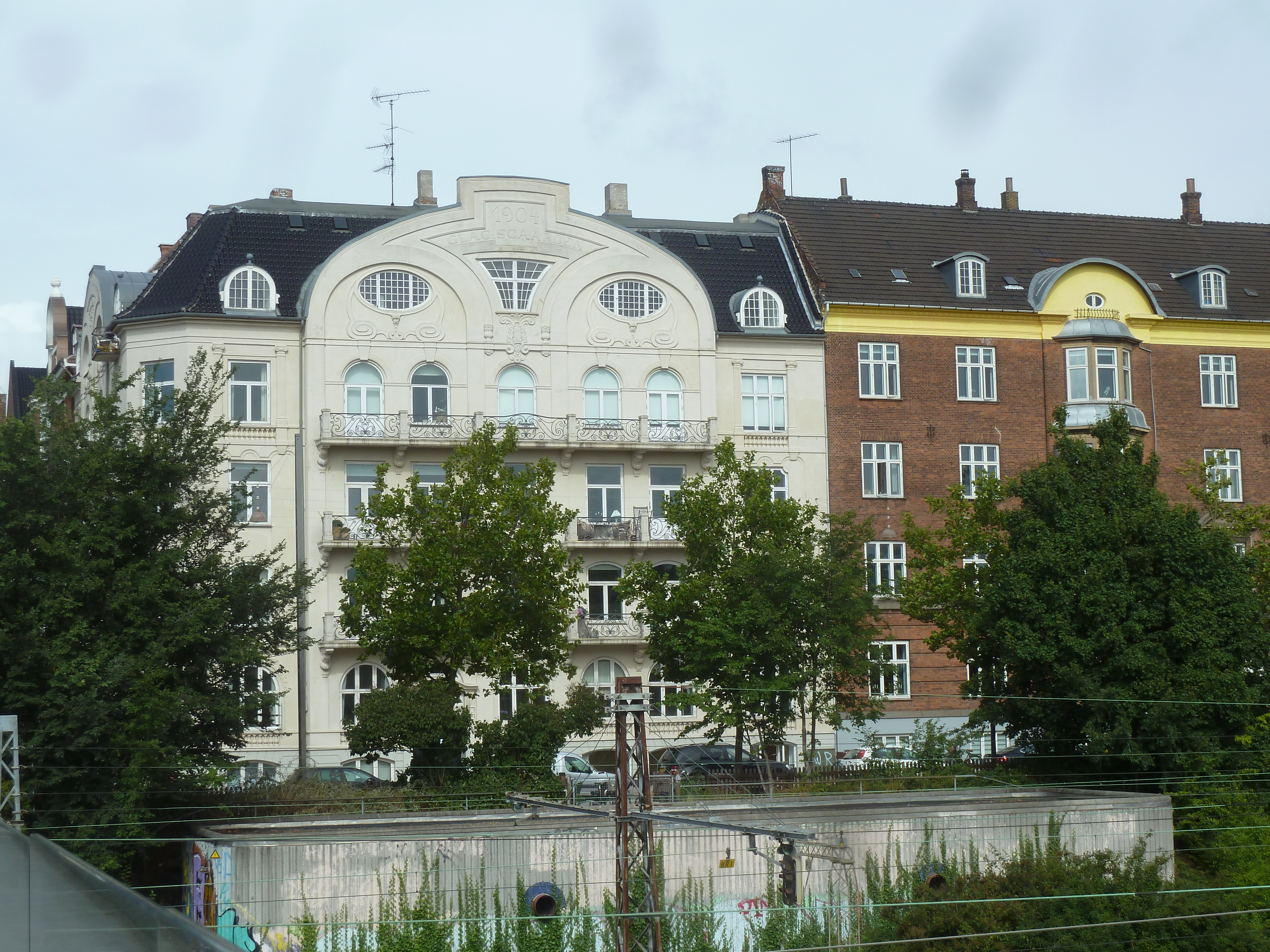
No. 11: Glacisgaarden

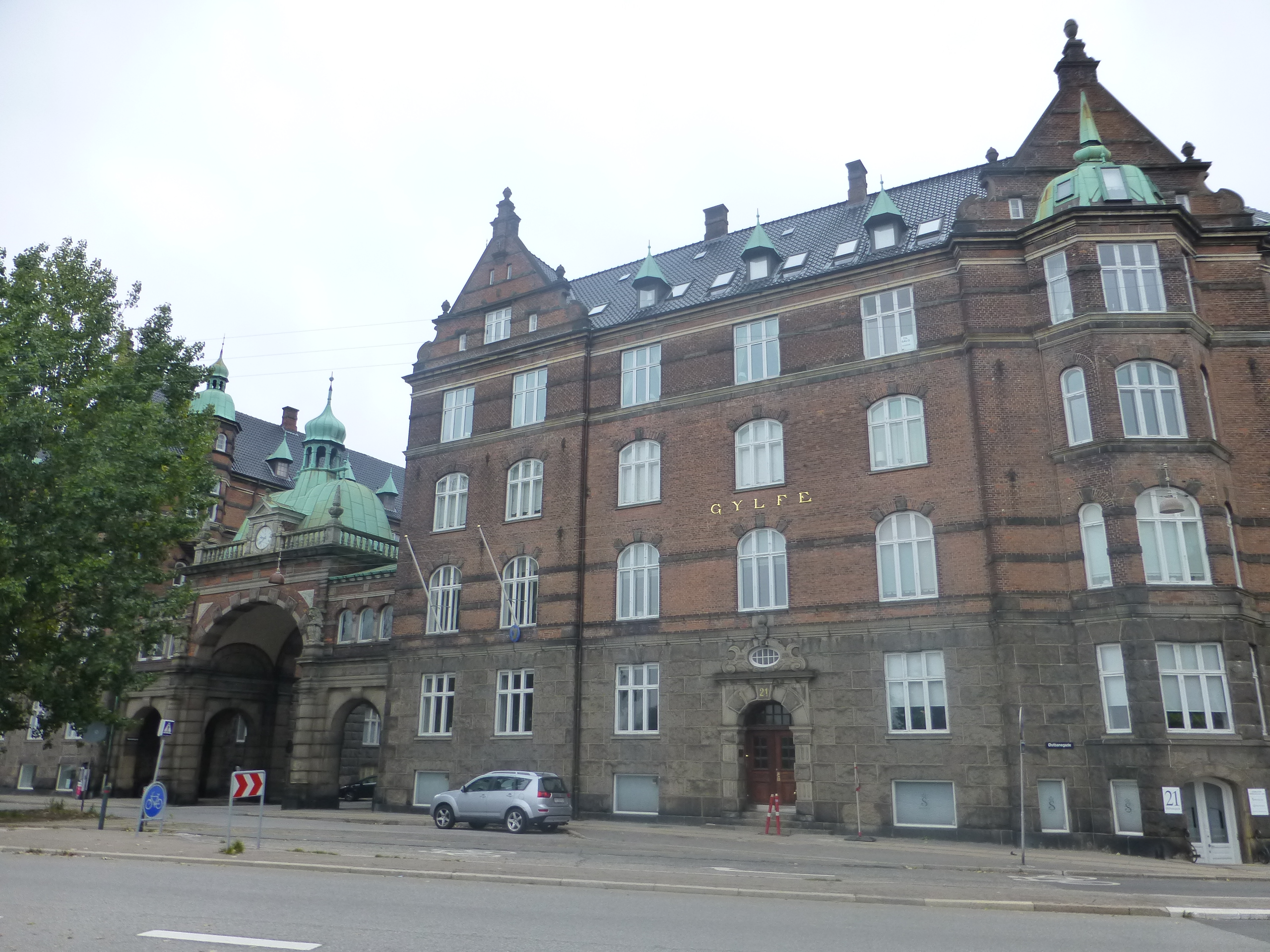
No. 21: Gylfe, now the Irish Embassy in Copenhagen
