= Sortedam Dossering =

Street in Copenhagen Municipality, Denmark

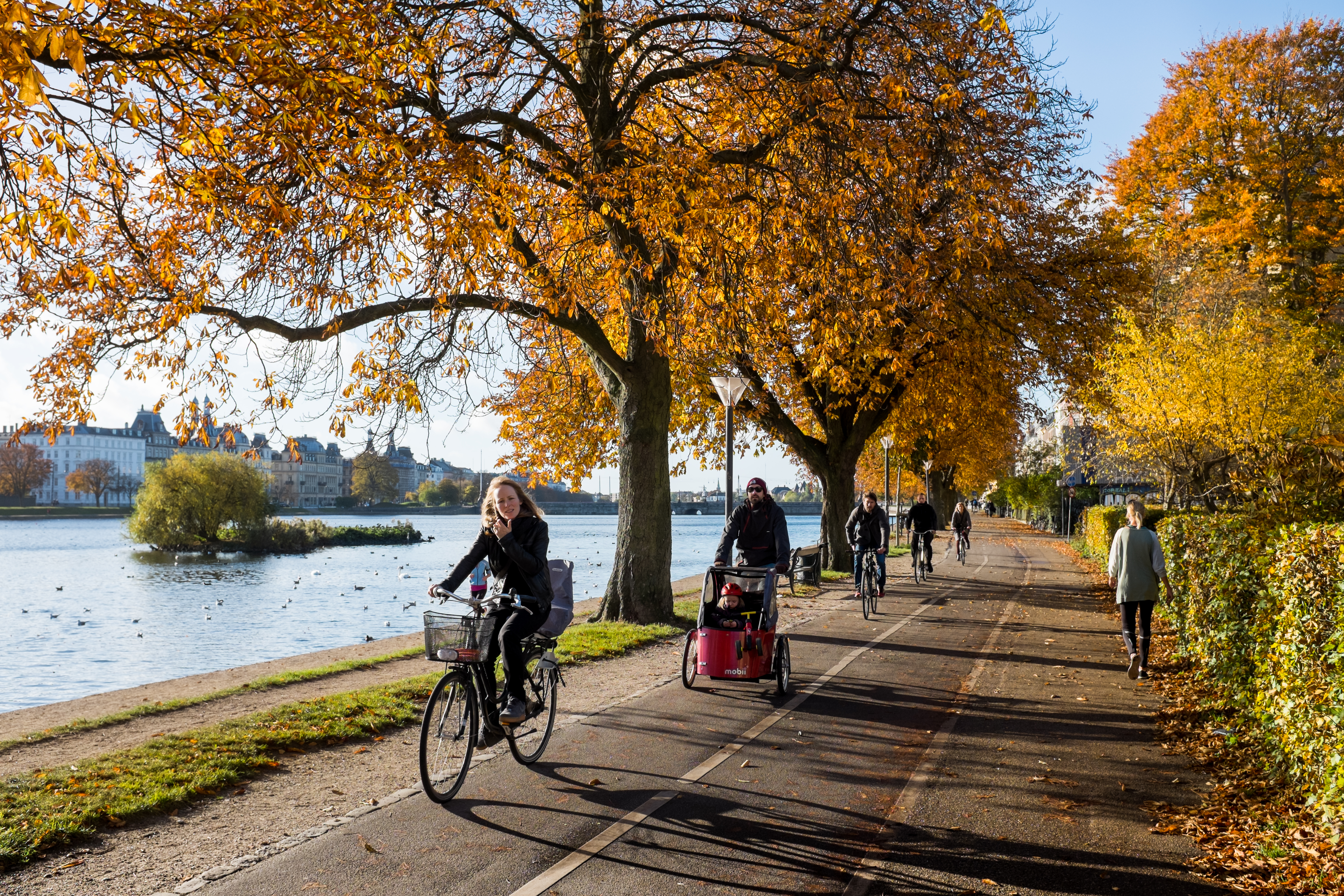
- Sortedam Dossering
- Length: 1,150 m (3,770 ft)
- Location: Copenhagen, Denmark
- Postal code: 2100
- Coordinates: 55°41′36.96″N 12°34′18.12″E

Sortedam Dossering is a street that follows the western shore of Sortedam Lake, from Nørrebrogade in the south to Østerbrogade in the north, in central Copenhagen, Denmark. The section north of Helgesensgade is closed to cars. The section from Nørrebrogade to Fredensgade is in Nørrebro while the section from Fredensgade to Østerbrogade belongs to Østerbro.

The southwestern continuation of the street, along Peblinge Lake, with only the short stretch between Nørrebrogade and Baggesensgade open to car traffic, is called Peblinge Dossering. Collectively Sortedam Dossering and Peblinge Dossering are known as Dosseringen (definite form). The path along the shore of St. Jørgen's Lake, the lake furthest to the south, is called Svineryggen ('The Rack of Pork').

== History ==
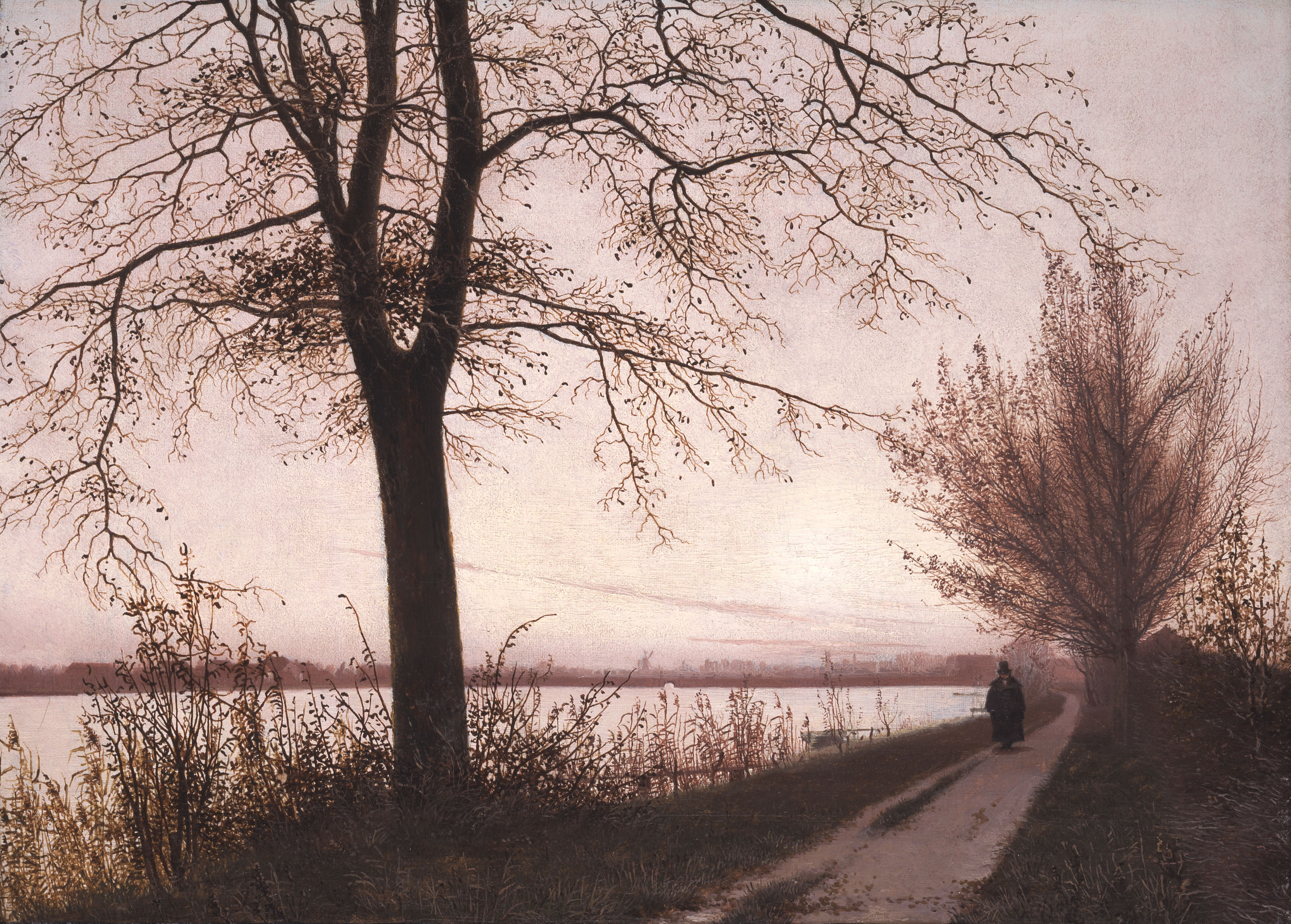
Sortedam Dossering painted by Christen Købke in 1838

Sortedam Lake is first mentioned in 1619 in the form "Sorte dam" but it is unclear if dam (pond) at this stage referred to a small lake or a dam. The word Dossering is derived from the French word Dos, meaning 'back', and refers to a path or road running on top of an embankment. The Dossering was originally a small path. It later belonged to the Water Authority and was closed to the public by a locked gate at each end. Residents at the Bleaching Ponds could obtain a key on the payment of a five mark deposit. The shoreline remained closed until the early 1850s.

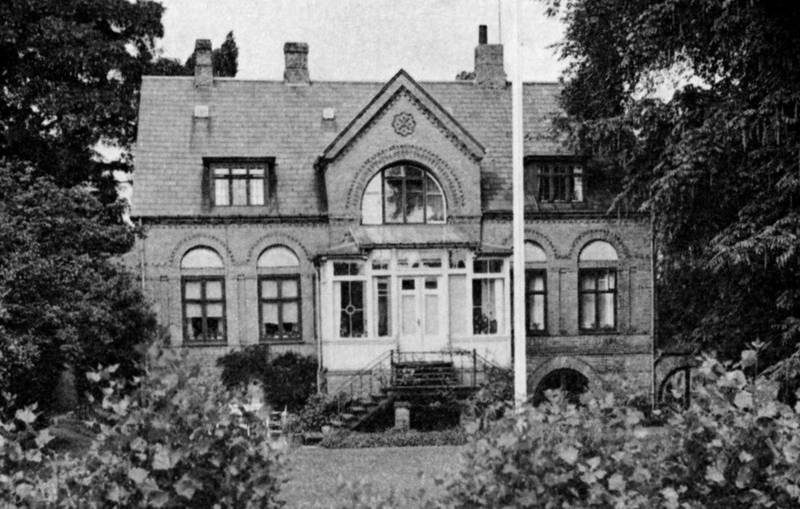
The house where C. V Jürgensen's mechanical workshop was based

The first houses along the path were built when the so-called demarcation line which had enforced a no-built zone outside the city's fortification ring was moved from Jagtvej to the western margin of the lakes in the 1852. One of them (Sortedam Dossering 37) belonged to pioneering precision mechanic Edvard Jünger who ran his company from the basement. It was taken over by Christopher Peter Jürgensen in 1869 and played a central part in the creation of Hansen's Writing Ball.

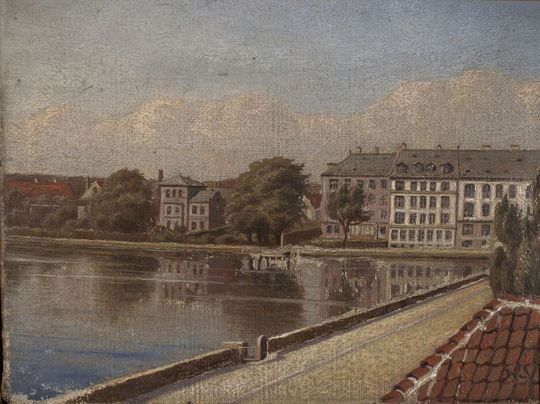
The end of Sortedam Dossering viewed from Østerbrogade, c. 1780

Most of the early houses on the street were gradually replaced by taller buildings. City architect Poul Holsøe was responsible for a redesign of the lakeside in 1929. This introduced the current solution with a lower part directly on the lake separated from the Dossering by a grassy slope and a line of chestnut trees. A residential block just north of Fredensgade was demolished in 1973 in connection with the later abandoned Søringen infrastructure project. The Fredens Park greenspace was later established at the site.

== Notable buildings and residents ==
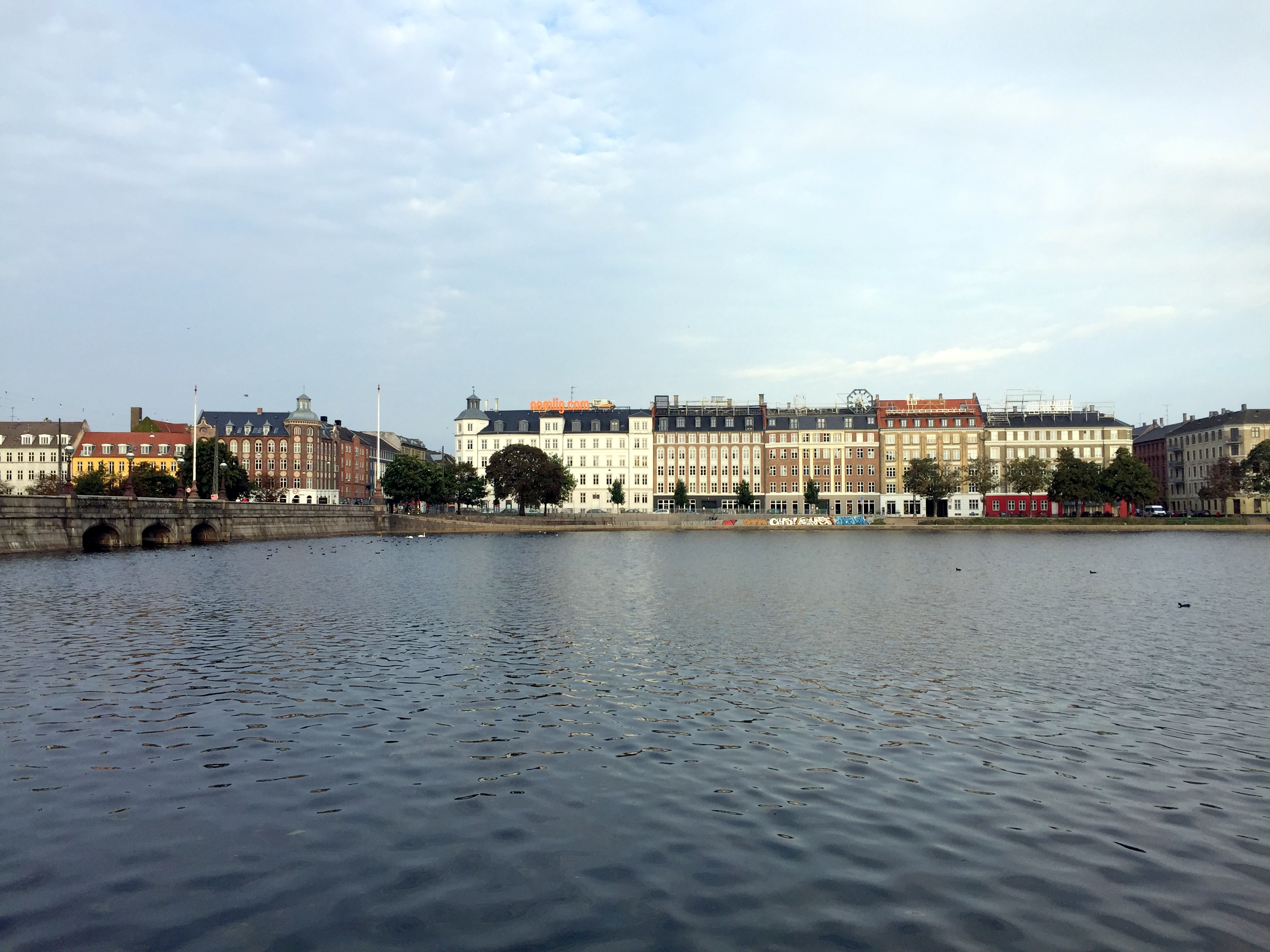
The Irma Block with Queen Louise's Bridge to the left

The block between Nørrebrogade and Ravnsborg Tværgade is known as the Irma Block (Danish: Irma Karréen). The supermarket chain Irma was founded at the site 1886. The oldest part of the 20,000 square metre block was built in 1871. It was renovated with the assistance of Årstiderne Arkitekter in 2014. Madklubben opened three restaurants in the complex in 2015. One of them is located in a former Irma warehouse in the interior courtyard.

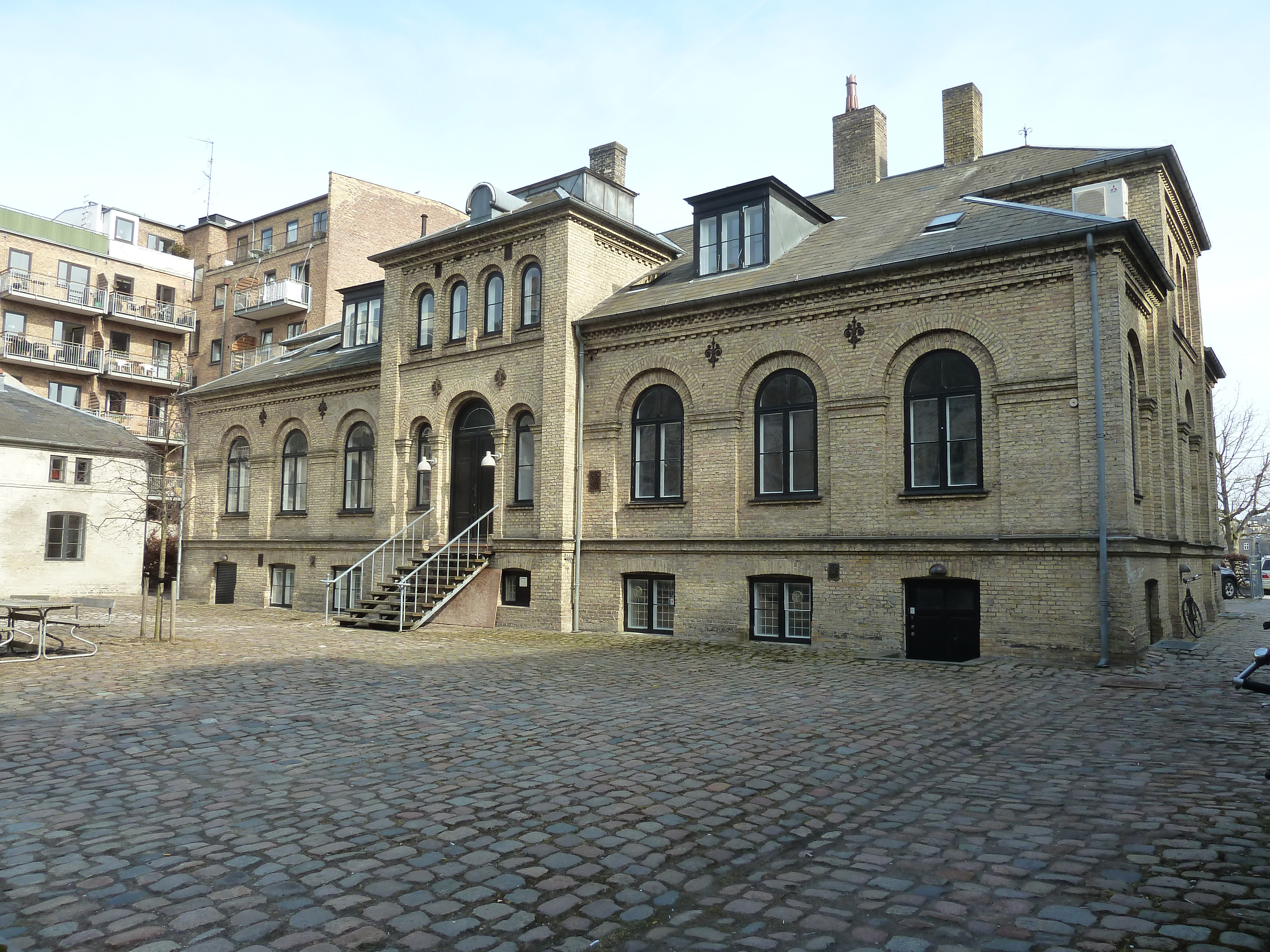
No. 55: Christianshvile as seen from the yard

The large senior citizens home Sølund was built in the 1950s. It has been decided to demolish the buildings and replace them with a combination of youth housing and a new senior citizens home. An architectural competition was launched for the 38,000 square metre project in 2015.

Christianshvile (No. 55) is one of few surviving villas at the lakes. It was built in 1869 to design by Georg E.W. Møller. Kronprins Frederiks og Kronprinsesse Louises Stiftelse in No. 59 is a charitable housing complex from 1901 designed by Ludvig Knudsen. Børnehjemmet af 1870 in No. 67 is an orphanage from 1870. Soldenfeldts Stiftelse in No. 85 is a charitable housing complex from 1895 designed by Hermann Baagøe Storck. The Sortedam School in No. 97 was established by Hanne Aller in 1892 and was the first school in Copenhagen for both boys and girls. It was ceded to Copenhagen Municipality in 1918 and is now a public primary school. The Modernist building on the corner with Østerbrogade was designed by Ib Lunding.

== Public art ==
A number of sculptures are situated along the street. Close to the street Læsøgade stands a nameless sculpture from 1991 by Gert Nielsen. A little further north, just south of Fredensgade, stands Søren Georg Jensen's sculpture Reclining Figure from the same year. On the other side of Fredensgade, just inside the small Fredens Park, stands the sculpture Gateway to Peace which was created by Hein Heinsen, Stig Brøgger and Mogens Møller in 1982. Further north, near Irmingersgade, stands Bjørn Poulsen's sculpture Omphalos from 1998, and Sonja Ferlov Mancoba's sculpture Effort commun from 1964 is situated at No. 69. The gable of No. 51 features a mural.

The Irma Hen (Irmahønen), Denmark's oldest neon sign and a locally famous landmark, has been laying its eggs on top of the Irma Block since 1953.
