= Asger Ostenfeld =

Danish civil engineer

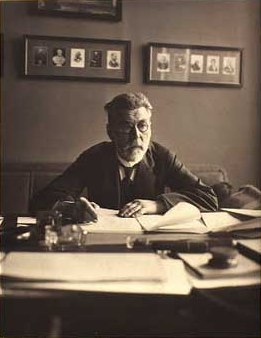
Asger Skovgaard Ostenfeld

Asger Skovgaard Ostenfeld (13 October 1866 – 23 September 1931) was a Danish civil engineer who specialized in the theory of steel and reinforced concrete structures. He is now considered to be the founding father of the theory of structures in Denmark.

== Biography ==
Ostenfeld was born in Hvirring near Horsens in Jutland in 1866. From 1900, he was professor of applied mechanics and steel structures at the Technical University of Denmark. In 1894, he designed the Langelinie Bridge at Østerport Station which at the time was the largest structure in Denmark built by a Danish engineer. In 1926, he was instrumental in creating Denmark's first Theory of Structures Laboratory which he later directed. Ostenfeld published a number of textbooks on the theory of structure which were widely read outside Denmark.

== Deformation method ==
Around 1920, Ostenfeld extended Axel Bendixsen's method of deformations together with the force method creating the dual concept of the method of deformations. His method represented significant progress in that "it enables previously analysed structural elements so to speak, to be built on". This is achieved through the introduction of rigidly fixed members for the obstruction of joint rotations. It allows the complete frame to be divided into finite elements.

== Principal works ==
- Teknisk Elektricitetslære (1st edition 1898, 4th edition 1924)
- Teknisk Statik I (3rd edition 1920)
- Teknisk Statik II (2nd edition 1913)
- Jernkonstruktioner I (3rd edition 1921)
- Jernkonstruktioner II (2nd edition 1917)
- Jernkonstruktioner III (2nd edition 1923)
- Jernbetonbroer (2nd edition 1920)
- Die Deformationsmethode (1926)
- Exzentrisch beanspruchte Säulen III beliebige Exzentrizität, Versuche mit Holz- und Stahlsäulen, Copenhagen, 1931.

Also contributions to Danish and foreign journals on Deformationsmetode, Aabne Broers Sidestivhed, Beregning af Søjler.
