= Frits Schlegel =

Danish architect

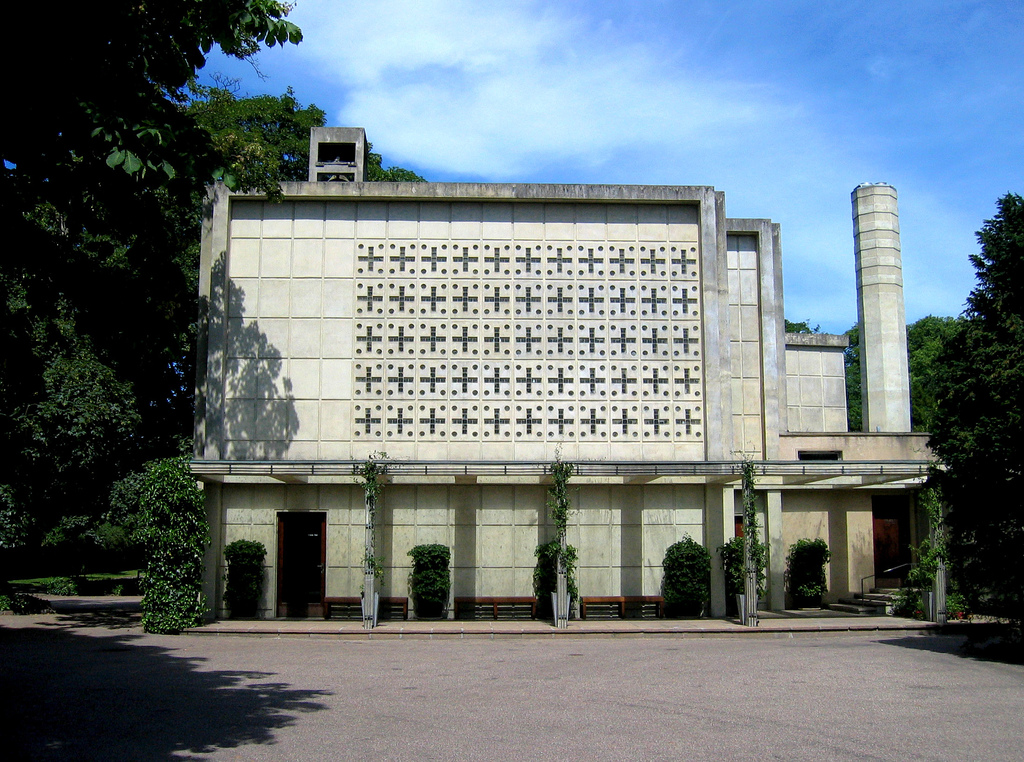
Mariebjerg Chapel and Crematory, 1936

Frits Schlegel (4 May 1896 - 5 March 1965) was a Functionalist Danish architect active during the transition from traditional craftsmanship to industrialized construction methods in the building industry. He was among the first architects in Denmark to experiment with poured-in-place concrete. His work was part of the architecture event in the art competition at the 1928 Summer Olympics.

== Biography ==
Schlegel was born in Frederiksberg, Copenhagen. He completed an apprenticeship as a mason in 1915 and studied at the Royal Danish Academy of Fine Arts from 1916 to 1923, winning the small gold medal in 1924 (for a stadium design) and the large gold medal in 1927 (for a university in Aarhus). After working at the offices of Edward Thomsen (1916–34) and Gudmund Nyeland Brandt (from 1920), Schlegel set up his own office in 1934 which he operated until his death in 1965.

His early works show inspiration from the French architect Auguste Perret. His most important works include Tivoli Concert Hall in the Tivoli Gardens, Mariebjerg Chapel and Overformynderiet in Copenhagen.

Particularly in the 1930s, Schlegel also designed a number of furniture lines with inspiration from the Bauhaus movement.

== Selected projects ==
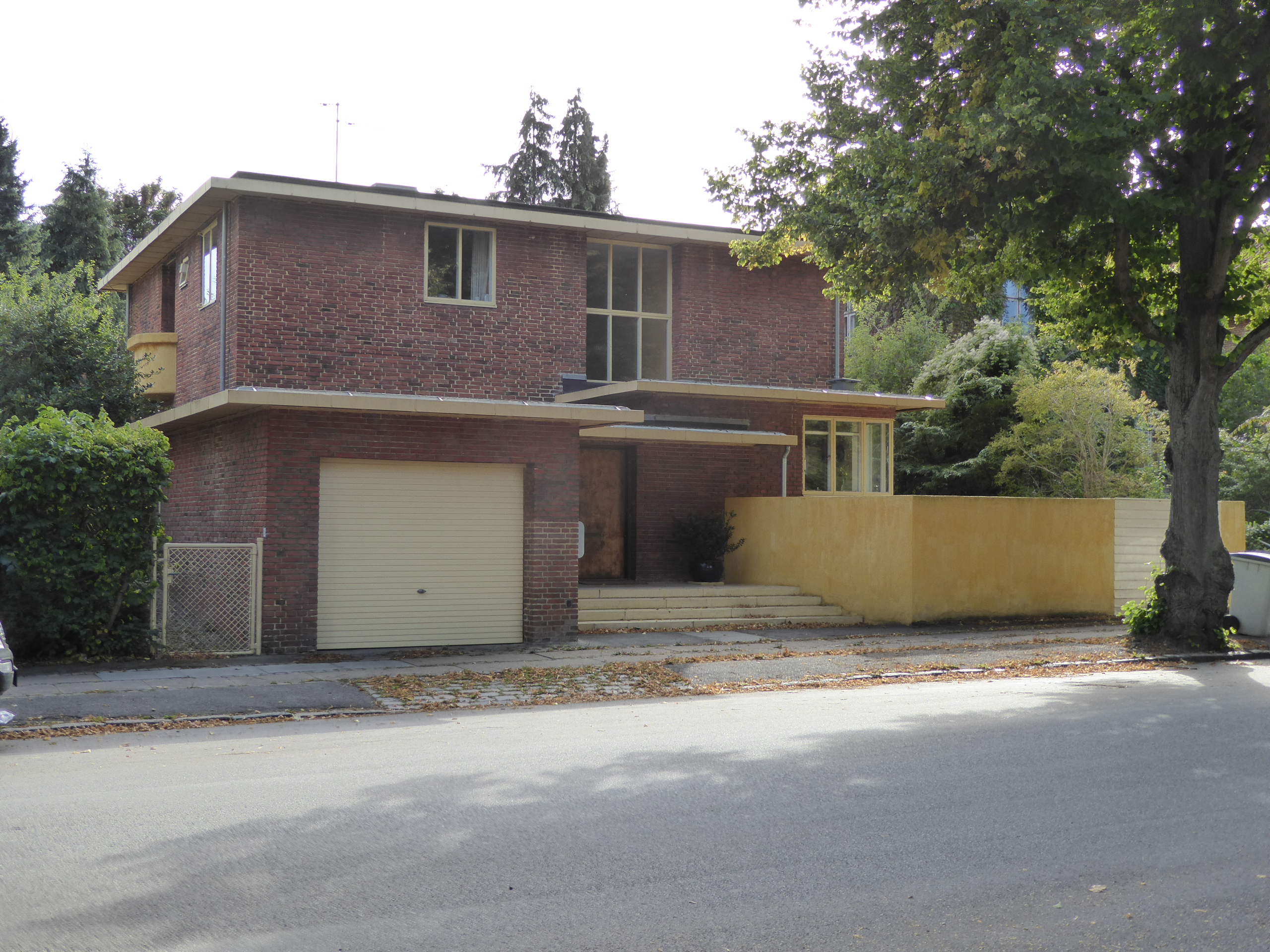
Ehlersvej 17

- Daells Varehus (with Vilhelm Lauritzen, 1923)
- Søndermark Crematory, Søndermark Cemetery, Copenhagen (with Edward Thomsen, 1926–27)
- Mariebjerg Chapel (1936)
- Overformynderiet, Copenhagen (1937)
- Giraffe House, Copenhagen Zoo, Copenhagen (1939)
- Statsanstalten for Livsforsikring (with Mogens Lassen, 1950–53)
- Tivoli Concert Hall, Tivoli Gardens, Copenhagen (with Hans Hansen, 1954–56)
- Bikuben building, Nørre Vold, Copenhagen (1956)

== Bibliography ==
- Andersson Møller, Vibeke, Arkitekten Frits Schlegel, Arkitektens Forlag. 2004. ISBN 87-7407-300-1 / ISBN 978-87-7407-300-0
