= Vibensgaard =

Historic townhouse in Copenhagen, Denmark

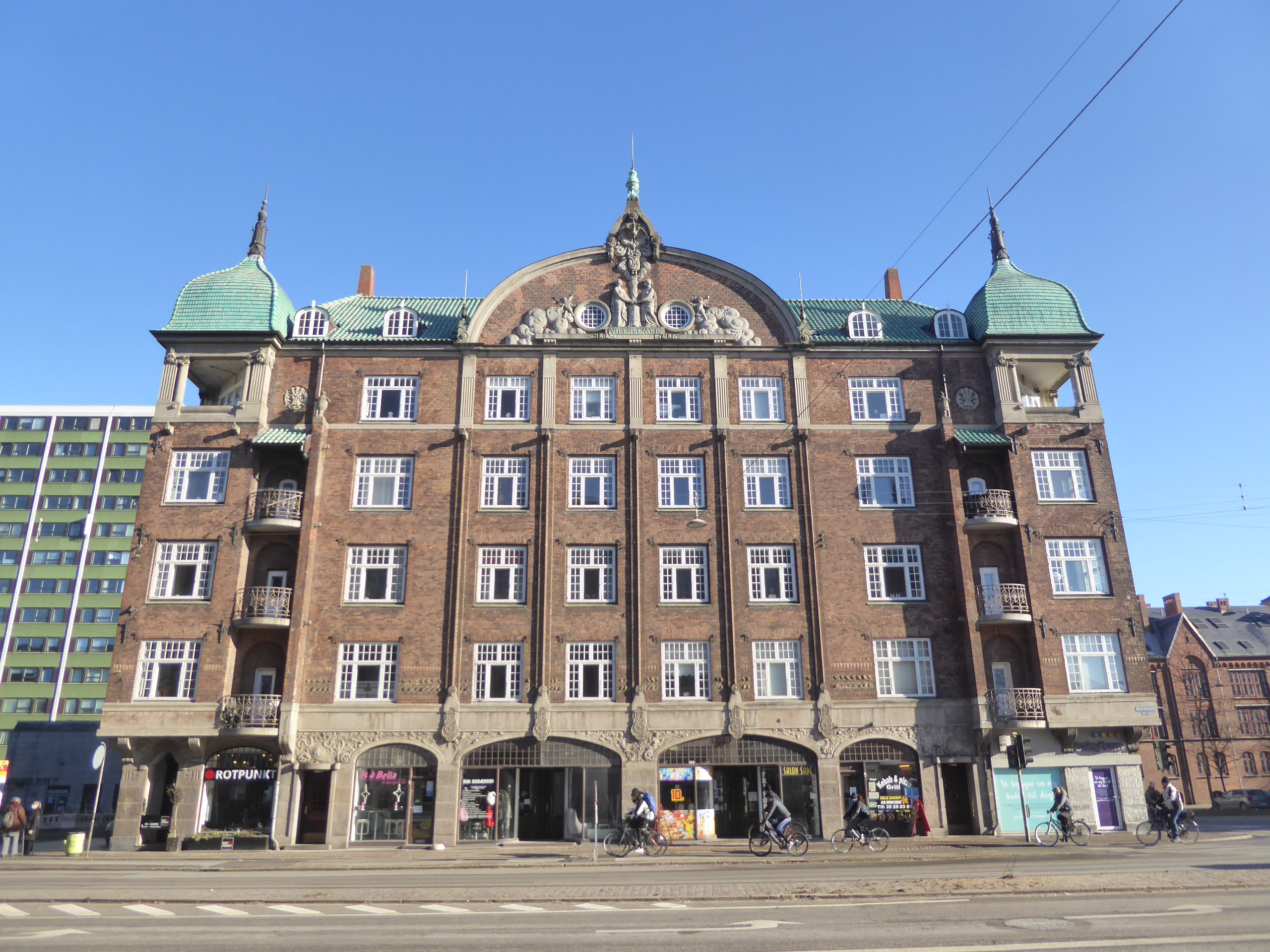
- Interactive map of the Vibensgaard area

General information
- Architectural style: Jugendstill
- Location: Copenhagen, Denmark
- Coordinates: 55°42′34.52″N 12°34′40.26″E
- Completed: 1905

Design and construction
- Architects: Anton Rosen, Peter Neerskov

Vibensgaard is a high-end, Art Nouveau-style apartment building situated on Østerbrogade (No. 158–160), between Strandboulevarden and Nyborggade (No. 2), in the Østerbro district of Copenhagen, Denmark. The lavishly decorated, three-winged building from 1903–05 was designed by Anton Rosen and Peter Neerskov. Most of the decorations are inspired by the flora and fauna of the sea and meadows, probably as a reference to the building's location between Copenhagen's Eastern Commons (Østerfælled) and the Øresund. The building was listed in the Danish registry of protected buildings and places in 1987.

== History ==
Vibensgaard was built by the brothers A. Mørck, a lawyer, and S. Mørck, a retired telegraphist. The name of the building was inspired by its location opposite Lille Vibenshus, a well-known inn and local landmark. The building was designed by Anton Rosen in collaboration with Reter Neerskov. The construction lasted from 1903 to 1905. It was overseen by E. C. J. Nielsen as executing architect.

The involved craftsmen and firms included master mason Carl Køhler, master carpenter Oskar Køhler, Silvan (woodwork), Lauritz Knudsen (electrical installations), master painters Schubeler & Sønner, master smith H. M. Nielsen, master plumbers Malmberg and Brødr. Thøfner, and master glazier Larsen.

Café Vibensgaard was located at the corner of Strandboulevarden in the building. Its interior walls featured a painted frieze with depictions of historic inns and beer gardens along the stretch of Strandvejen from Lille Vibenshus to the Red Gate to Jægersborg Dyrehave. A system with counterweights made it possible to lower the restaurant's window panes into the basement in the summer time.

The building was listed in the Danish registry of protected buildings and places in 1987. It was still owned by descendants of the Mørck brothers at this point.

The building was converted into a cooperative housing association (andelsforening) in 2017.

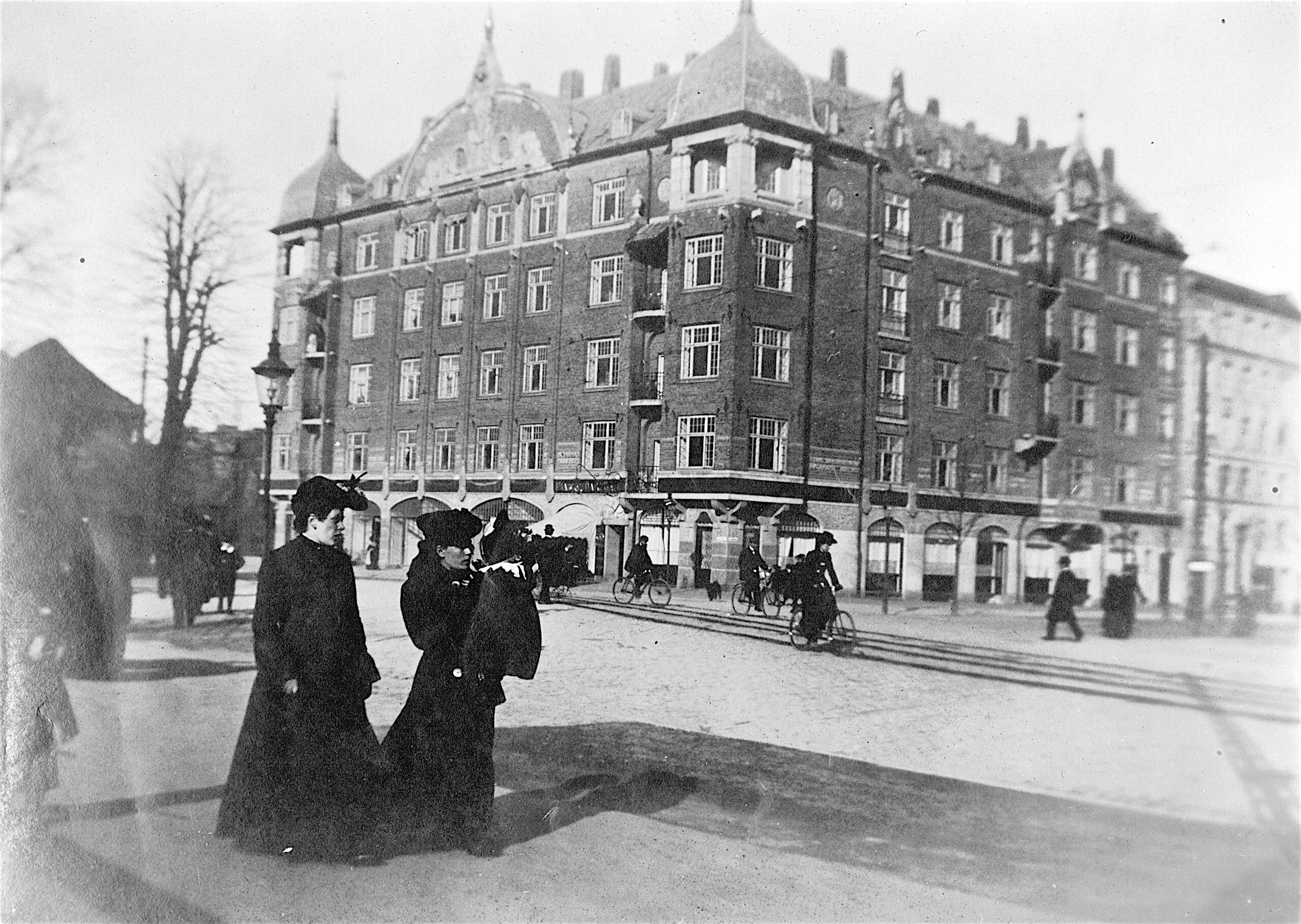
Vibensgaard in 1905

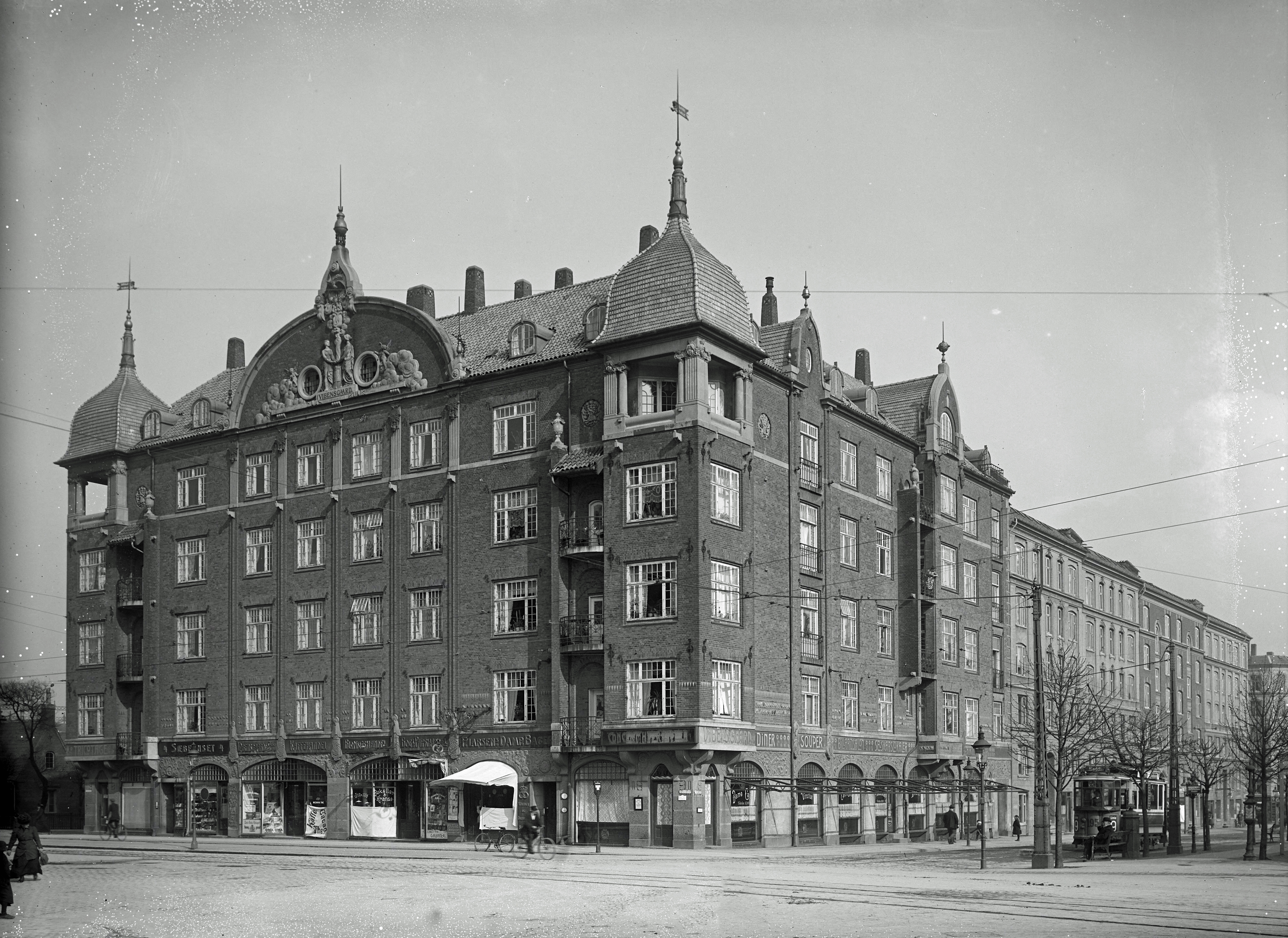
Vibensgaard in 1914

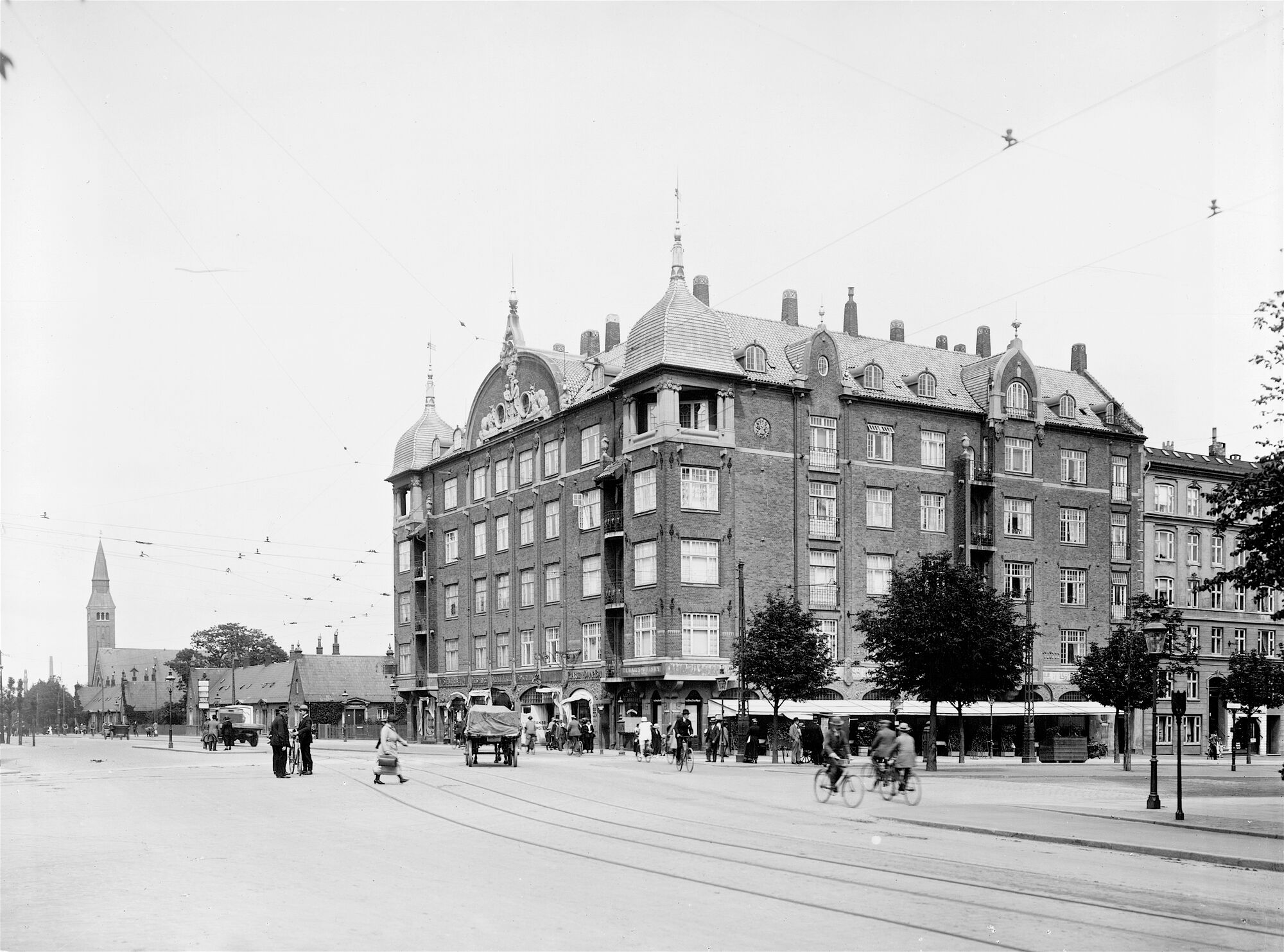
Vibensgaard photographed by Peter Elfelt in 1922

== Architecture ==
Vibensgaard is a three-winged, five-storey complex, surrounding a rectangular, central courtyard. The building is constructed in reddish-brown brick towards the street and red brick towards the yard, combined with timber decks and Hennebique concrete elements (by Carl Schiøtz). The principal facade on Østerbrogade features a four-bay median risalit. It is flanked by two wide window bays, then two more narrow balcony bays and finally two corner turrets. The median risalit is topped by a segmental pediment featuring two symmetrically arranged female figures holding each other's hands above a hearth from which smoke rises. The female figures were created on site by the sculptor Hans Gyde Petersen. They are flanked by two round windows. The roof is clad in emerald green, glazed tile from Frederiksholm Vrickyard. The two turrets are topped by ogre cones clad in so-called "beaver-tail" tiles. The ground floor of the building is faced with granite rustication. It is topped by a limestone frieze featuring flora and fauna of the sea and meadows. The limestone frieze was created on site by sculptor and stucco artist H. Lamberg-Petersen. It is followed by another frieze, in sandstone, with plant ornamentation. The upper part of the facade is executed in undressed brick. It features a number of medallions with plant ornamentation. Other decorative elements are executed in patterned brickwork or in stone, including naturally shaped stones, beach stones and ashlars. The upper floors of the two turrets are open loggias with fluted columns or pilasters at the three corners. The three central storeys have small balconies with wrought iron railings.

The secondary wings on Strandboulevarden and Nyborggade differ from each other. The Strandboulevarden wing is seven bays long. The extra wide, projecting first and fourth bay are both topped by an ogee wall dormer. The fourth-bay wall dormer features a French balcony. The narrow third bay features a balcony with wrought iron railings on the three upper floors. The Nyborggade wing is only four storeys tall and six bays long. The extra wide, projecting second and fourth bays are again topped by ogee wall dormers. The sixth bay is narrower than the other bays. This side of the building has no balconies, probably because it is facing north.

The granite and sandstone work was executed by Maag & Møller. The artificial stone was created by Emanuel Jensen & H. Schumacher.

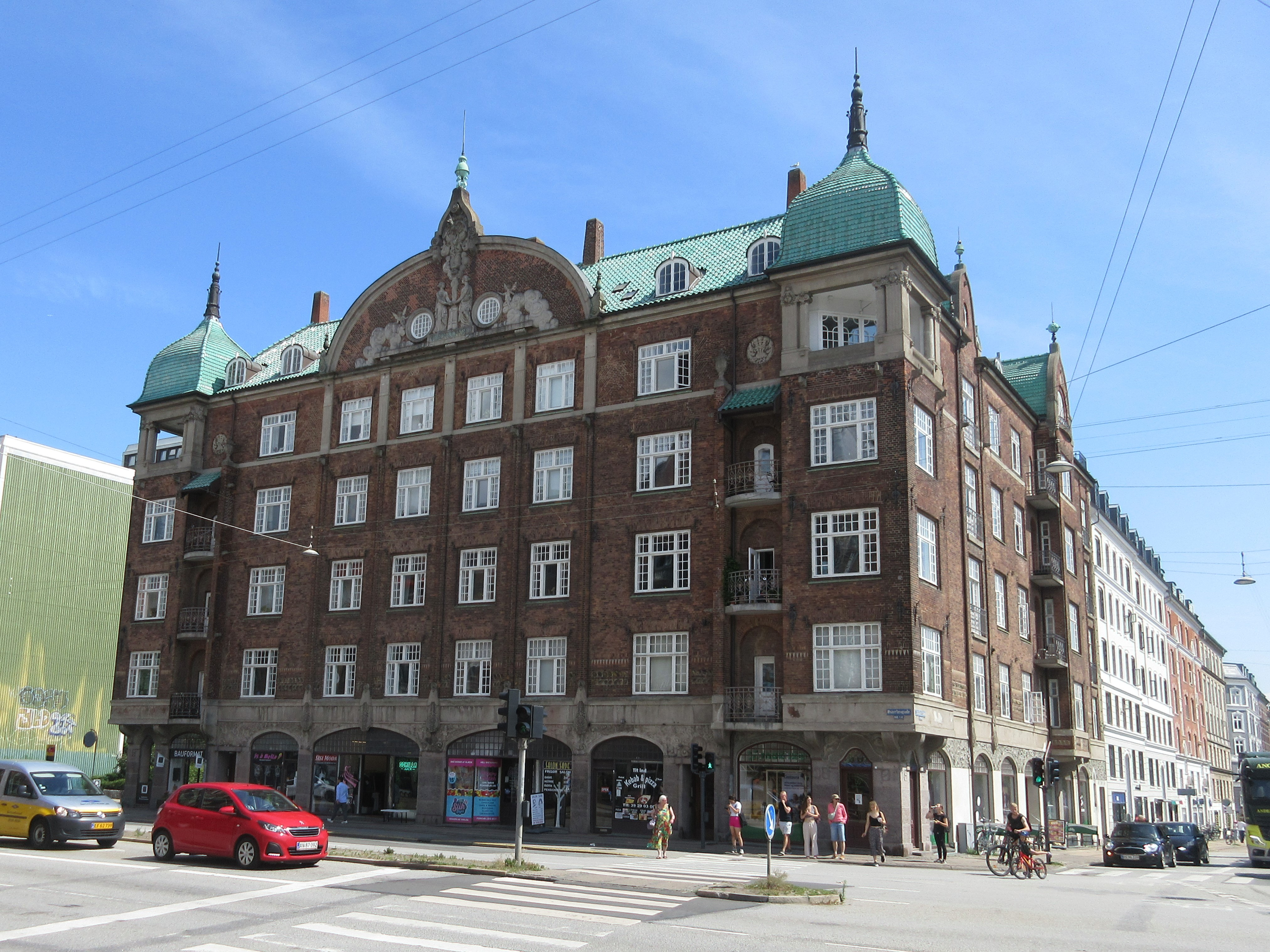

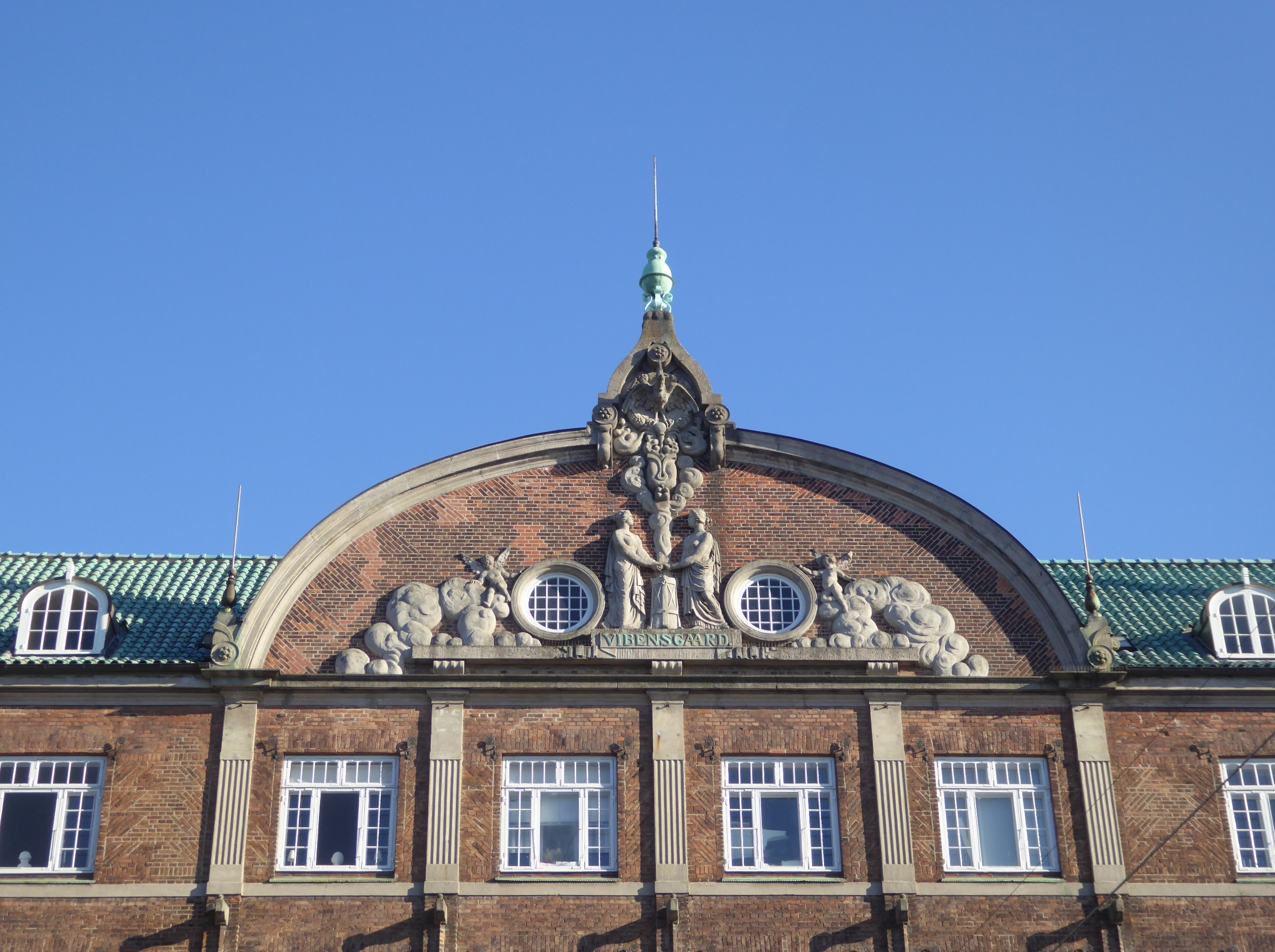

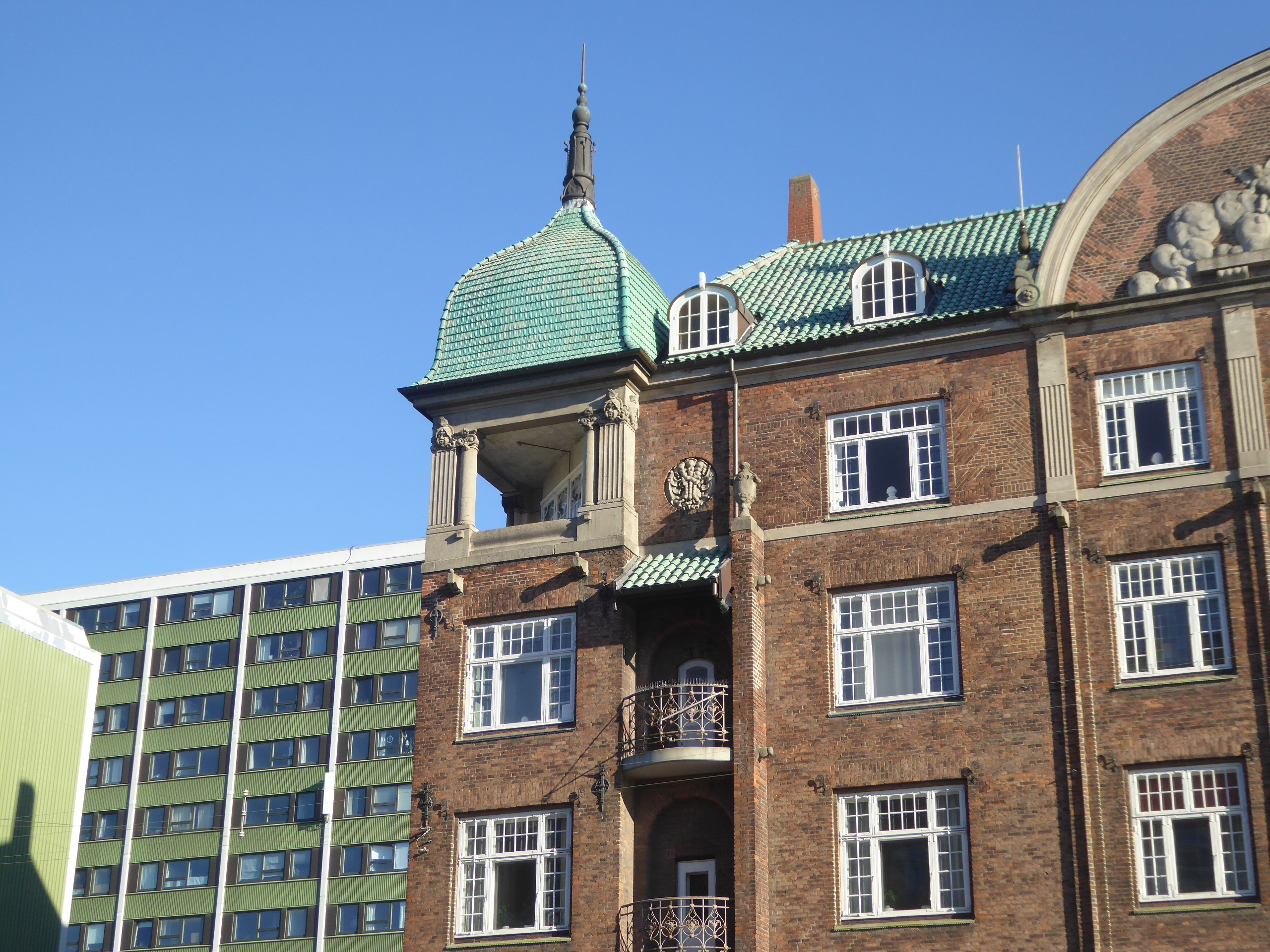

== Interior ==
Each of the four upper floors holds two six-room apartments (one facing Strandboulevarden and one at the corner of Strandboulevarden and Østerbrogade), a five-room apartment (corner of Østerbrogade and Nyborggade), a four-room apartment and a three-room apartment (both facing Nybrogade).

The two principal staircases of the building on Østerbrogade (No. 158 and No. 160) are accessed via two vaulted vestibules. The staircases have intricately carved railings with fluted balusters. They are wrapped around two richly decorated lifts delivered by Titan A/S. The walls are painted with geometrical and botanical ornamentation. The staircase at No. 158 features a stucco frieze incorporating small M's (for Mørck). A number of bon mots are painted onto the walls of the staircase at No. 160. Some of them read (translated into English):

- "who often moves will seldom become rich"
- "A good neighbour is better than a brother in another town"
- "It does no good to do one's neighbour harm"
- "Work has a bitter root but sweet taste"

The staircase at Nyborggade 2 is a somewhat scaled-down version of the two principal staircases. Three secondary staircases (co-called "kitchen staircases") are also located in the building.

All the apartments have rooms with rich stucco ornamentation. The theme of the custom-made stucco is again pewits and other flora and fauna associated with the meadows. Some of the original, custom-made door handles with pewits have also survived.

The frieze with motifs from Strandvejen in the former restaurant premises was rediscovered in connection with a renovation of the ground floor in 2021. The restoration was carried out with the assistance of the architectural firm Elgaard Architecture.
