= Sankt Jakobs Plads =

Public square in the Østerbro district of Copenhagen, Denmark

Coordinates: 55.7032°N 12.5778°E

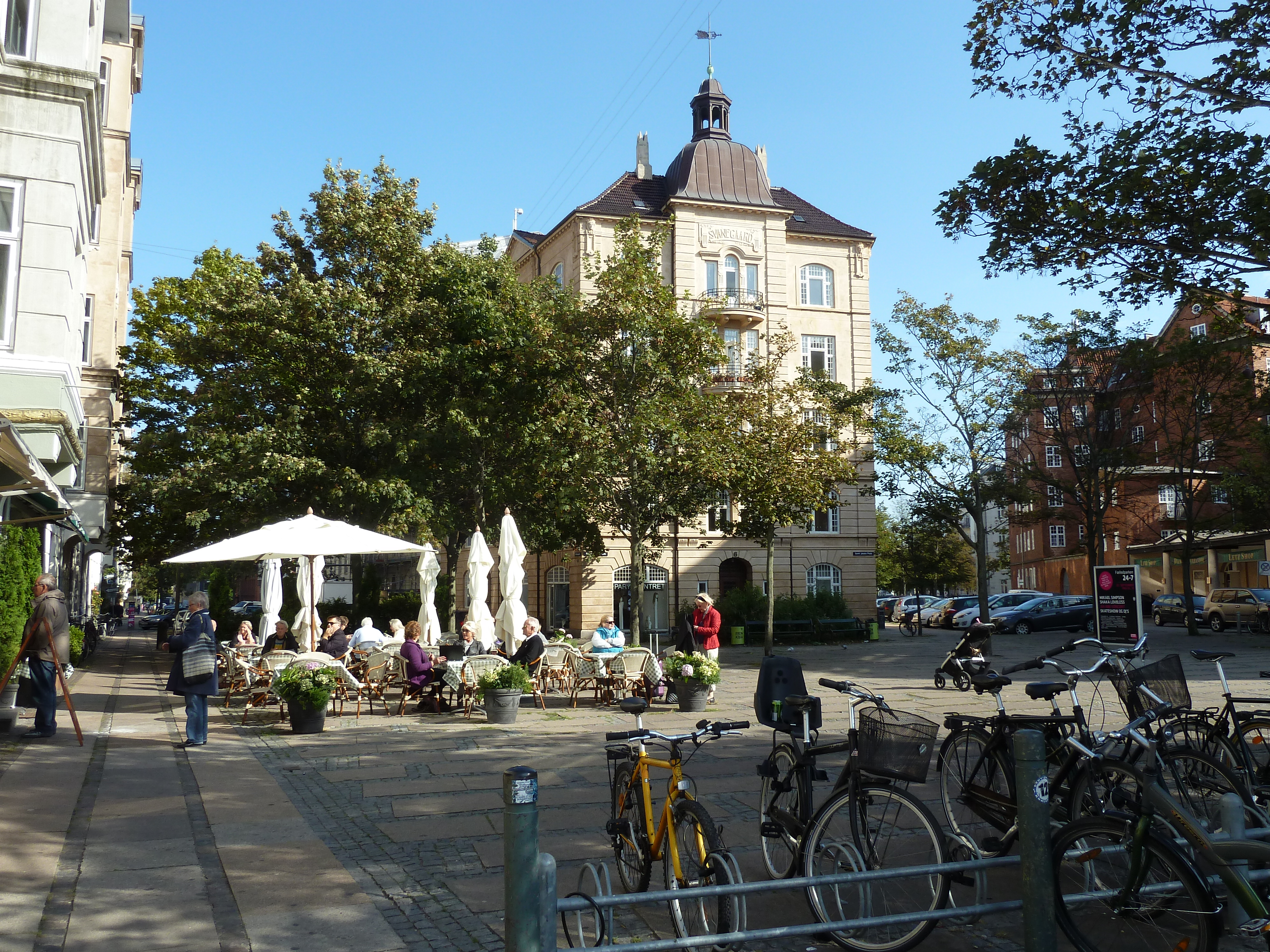
Sankt Jakobs Plads

Sankt Jakobs Plads (lit. 'St. James' Square') is a public square located off the east side of Østerbrogade in the Østerbro district of Copenhagen, Denmark. It takes its name after St. James' Church (Sankt Jakobs Kirke) on the other side of the street.

== Streets and buildings ==
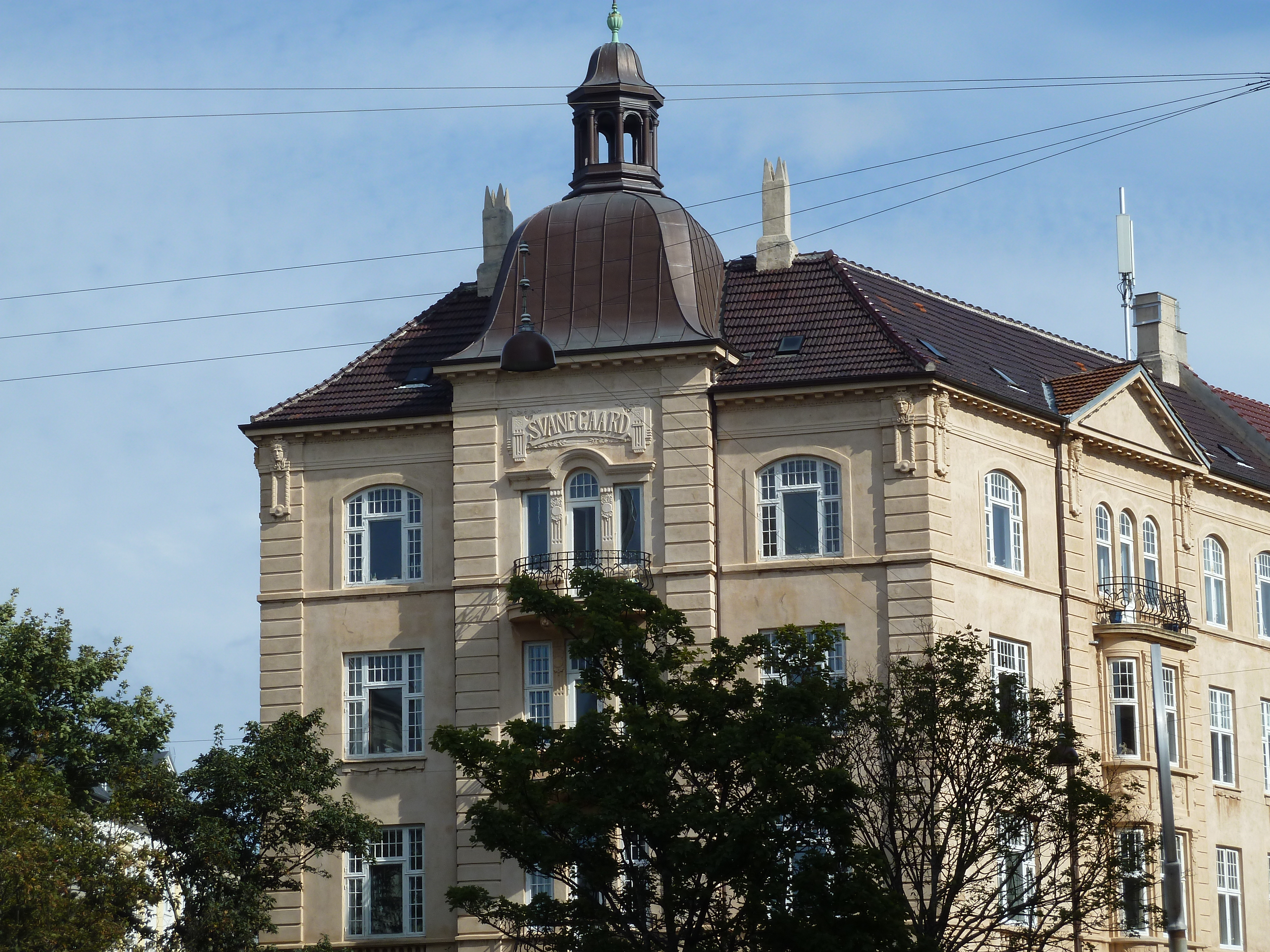
Detail of Svanegaard

The church also lends its name to Sankt Jakobs Gade which runs south-east, connecting the square to the beginning of Randersgade at Lutherkirken, just off Nordre Frihavnsgade. Rothesgade runs east to Randersgade from where it continues as Gammel Kalkbrænderi Vej to Strandboulevarden.

The site between the two streets is occupied by Svanegaard, the most distinctive building on the square. It was completed by Philip Smidth in 1904 with inspiration from French architecture. The other buildings around the square date from the same period.

== Restaurants ==
Several restaurants and cafés are located on the square, including brasserie Le Saint Jacques run by Daniel Letz, the former head chef of Kong Hans Kælder who received the first Danish Michelin star in 1984. Letz also owns a delicacy store at 4 Sankt Jakobs Gade.

== See also ==
- Søtorvet, Copenhagen
