= Gunnar Nu Hansens Plads =

Square in Copenhagen, Denmark

Coordinates: 55.7050°N 12.5747°E

Gunnar Nu Hansens Plads is a public space in the Østerbro district of Copenhagen, Denmark. It consists of a triangular plaza, located on the west side of Østerbrogade, just north of Parken Stadium, which turns into a wide street and continues for about 200 m to Fælledparken, The street then continues southwest as Per Henrik Lings Allé to Øster Allé. Several sports venues, some of which are listed, are located on the south side of the square. The former Østerfælled Barracks, now a mixed-use development known as Østerfælled Torv, are located on its north side.

== History ==
The first football games were played on the East Common in the 1870s. The football side Boldklubben af 1893 founded at the site in 1893 and was later joined by several other sport clubs. Københavns Idrætspark (Copenhagen Sports Park) was established in 1911 and several sports venues were later built in the area. The space today known as Gunnar Nu Hansens Plads was originally called Idrætsalléen (The Sports Avenue). In 1942, its name was changed to Staunings Plads (Stauning's Square) after prime minister Thorvald Stauning who lived in nearby Kanslergade. In 1981, the space was renamed Ved Idrætsparken (At Idrætsparken) and the name Staunings Plads was instead transferred to a space on Vester Farimagsgade. The current name was introduced in 1993 following Gunnar "Nu" Hansen's death the previous year.

== Notable buildings and residents ==
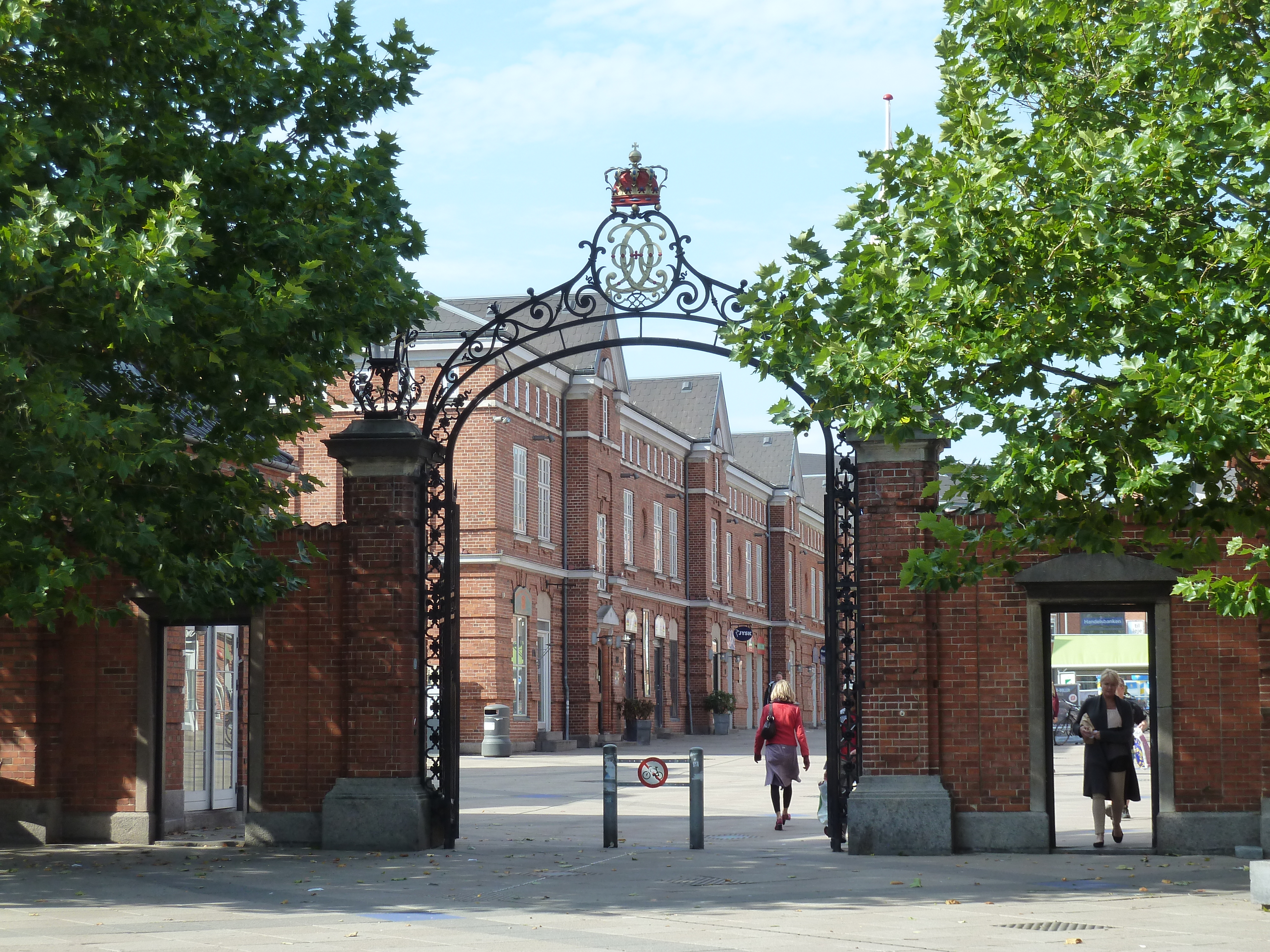
The old gate to the barracks

Øbro Hallen (No. 1–3) was built in 1926–30 to design by Wittmaack og Hvalsøe and was Denmark's first indoor, public swimming pool. Københavns Idræts Forening is based at No. 3A.

Østerbro Stadium (No. 7) and Idtrætshuset (The Sports House) are from 1914 and were designed by Søren Lemche. Lemche also designed B93's tennis hall from 1912 which is now known as Sparta Hallen. Both buildings were listed in 2009. The athletica club Sparta is based at No. 7.

On the north side of Gunnar Nu Hansens Plads is the former Østerfælled Barracks which were redeveloped in the 1990s and are now known as Østerfælled Torv.

== Public art ==
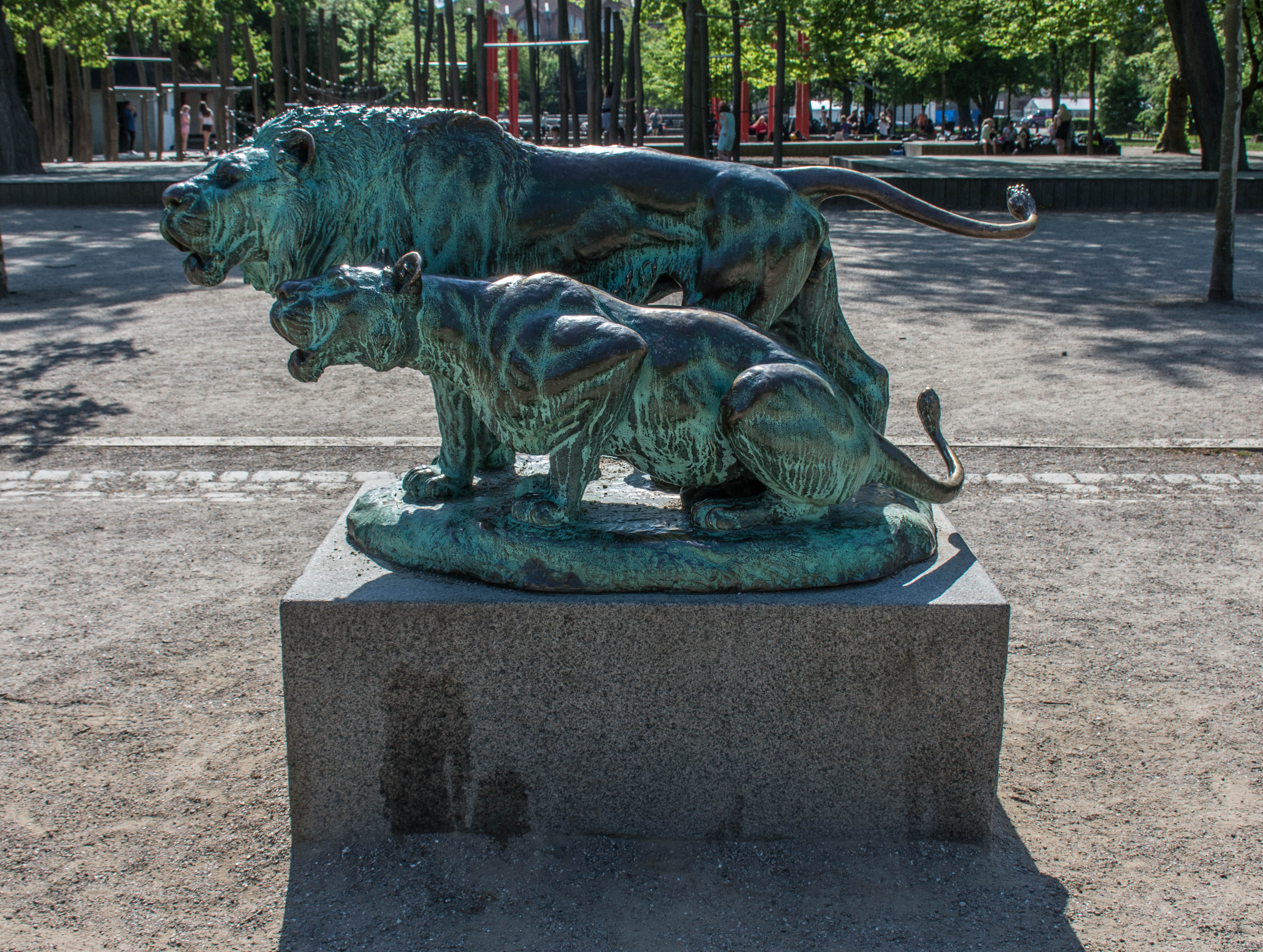
Two Lions

Lauritz Jensen's life-size sculpture of Two Lions is located in the section of the square which is also known as Den Franske Plads. The sculpture is from 1905 and was originally placed on present-day Israels Plads but later moved to Poul Henningsens Plads and eventually to its current location in 1916.
