= Østerbrogade =

Street in Copenhagen, Denmark

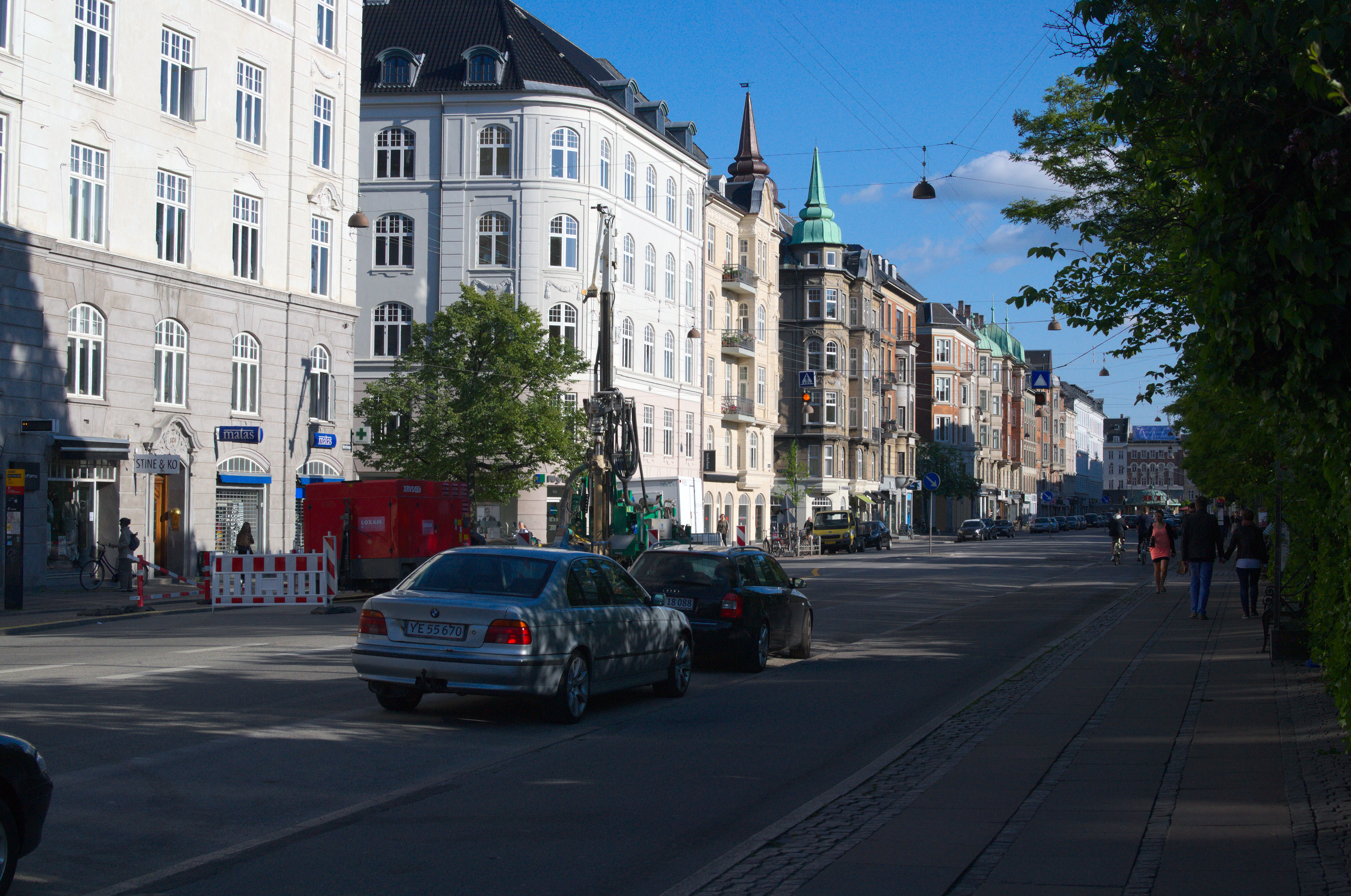
- Interactive map of Østerbrogade
- Length: 2,200 m (7,200 ft)
- Location: Copenhagen, Denmark
- Quarter: Østerbro
- Postal code: 2100
- Nearest metro station: Trianglen Station, Poul Henningsens Plads, Svanemøllen station
- Coordinates: 55°42′23″N 12°34′39″E
- Southeast end: Lille Triangel
- Major junctions: Jagtvej/Strandboulevarden
- Northwest end: Strandvejen

Østerbrogade is the principal shopping street and thoroughfare in the Østerbro district of Copenhagen, Denmark. It extends from Lille Triangel at the north-eastern tip of The Lakes to Svanemøllen station in the north, linking Dag Hammerskiolds LAlé with Strandvejen. The most important junctions are at Trianglen (Blegdamsvej, Nordre Frihavnsgade) and Poul Henningsens Plads (Jagtvej, Strandboulevarden. The 2,2 km long street passes a number of other squares and public spaces, including Gunnar Nu Hansens Plads, Sankt Jakobs Plads and Østerfælled Torv. Notable landmarks include St. James' Church and the old entrance building to Østerbro Stadium.

The street is served by two metro stations, Trianglen Station at Trianglen and Poul Henningsens Plads station at Jagtvej. Svanemøllen Station at the northern end of the street is served by S-trains.

== Location ==
The 2.2 km long street runs from Lille Triangel in the south to Svanemøllen Station in the north. The first leg of the street—from Lille Triangel to Trianglen—is approximately 280 m long. Its western side is dominated by the northeastern end of Sortedam Lake. The only side streets that extend from the west side of this stretch of Østerbrogade are Nørre Søgade and Sortedam Dossering, which run along each side of the lake, and Ryesgade. The side streets which extend from the east side of the street are Classensgade, Willemoesgade, Slagelsegade, Rosenvængets Allé and Odensegade.

The second leg of Østerbrogade—from Trianglen to Poul Henningsens Plads—is approximately one km long. This section of the street passes the squares Sankt Jakobs Plads (after c. 440 m) and Gunnar Nu Hansens Plads (after c. 580 m). Most of the side streets are relatively quiet residential streets. One of the larger side streets is Åarhusgade, which continues all the way to the southern part of Nordhavn. Poul Henningsens Plads is a small greenspace at the corner of Østerbrogade and Jagtvej. On the other side of Østerbrogade, Jagtvej turns into Strandboulevarden.

The third leg of the street—from Poul Henningsens Plads to Svanemøllen Station—is approximately 900 m long.

== History ==
=== Early history ===
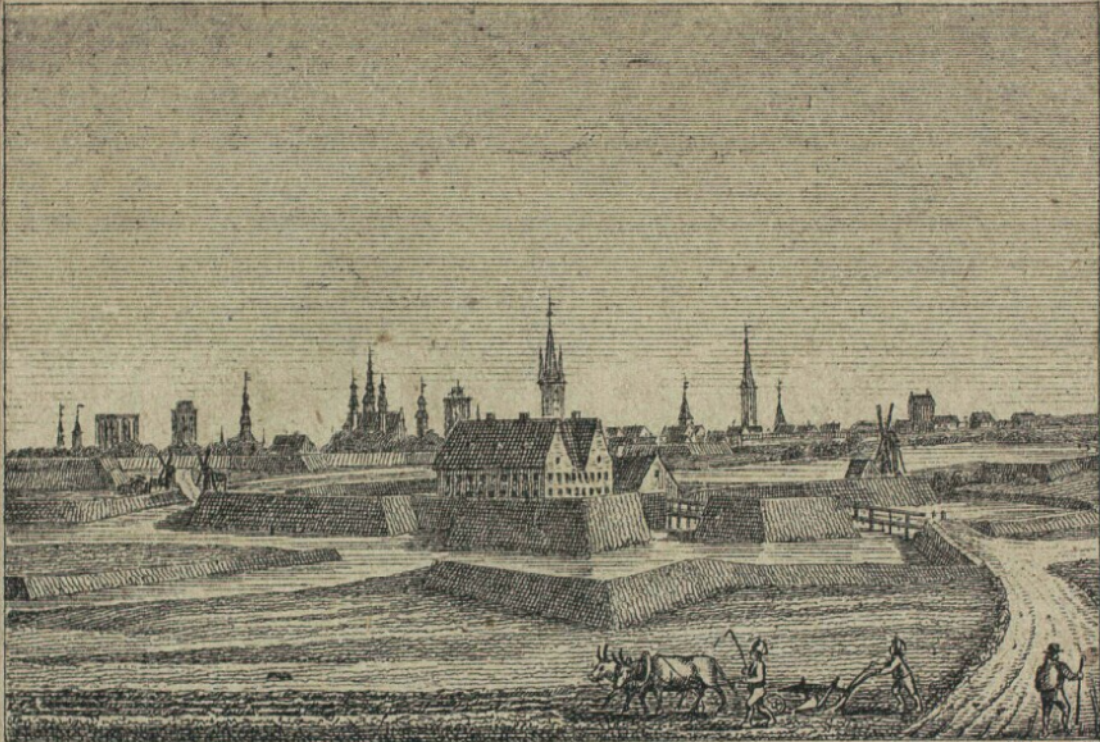
Vartorv in 1646

Østerbrogade originated as the old main road which extended from the Eastern City Gate, paradoxically located north of the city. Originally it was simply known as Østerbro, and the name only referred to the stretch between the city gate and present-day Trianglen, where it continued as Strandvejen (English: The Beach Road) along the coast.

The hospital Vartov was in 1630 moved to the site where Trianglen is now located. Its fortified building was part of Christian IV's defense of Copenhagen. The East Road passed through the complex, which consisted of four wings surrounded by ramparts and moats. The building was destroyed during the Swedish siege of Copenhagen in 1658. Vartov subsequently moved to its current home on Vester Voldgade in 1665.

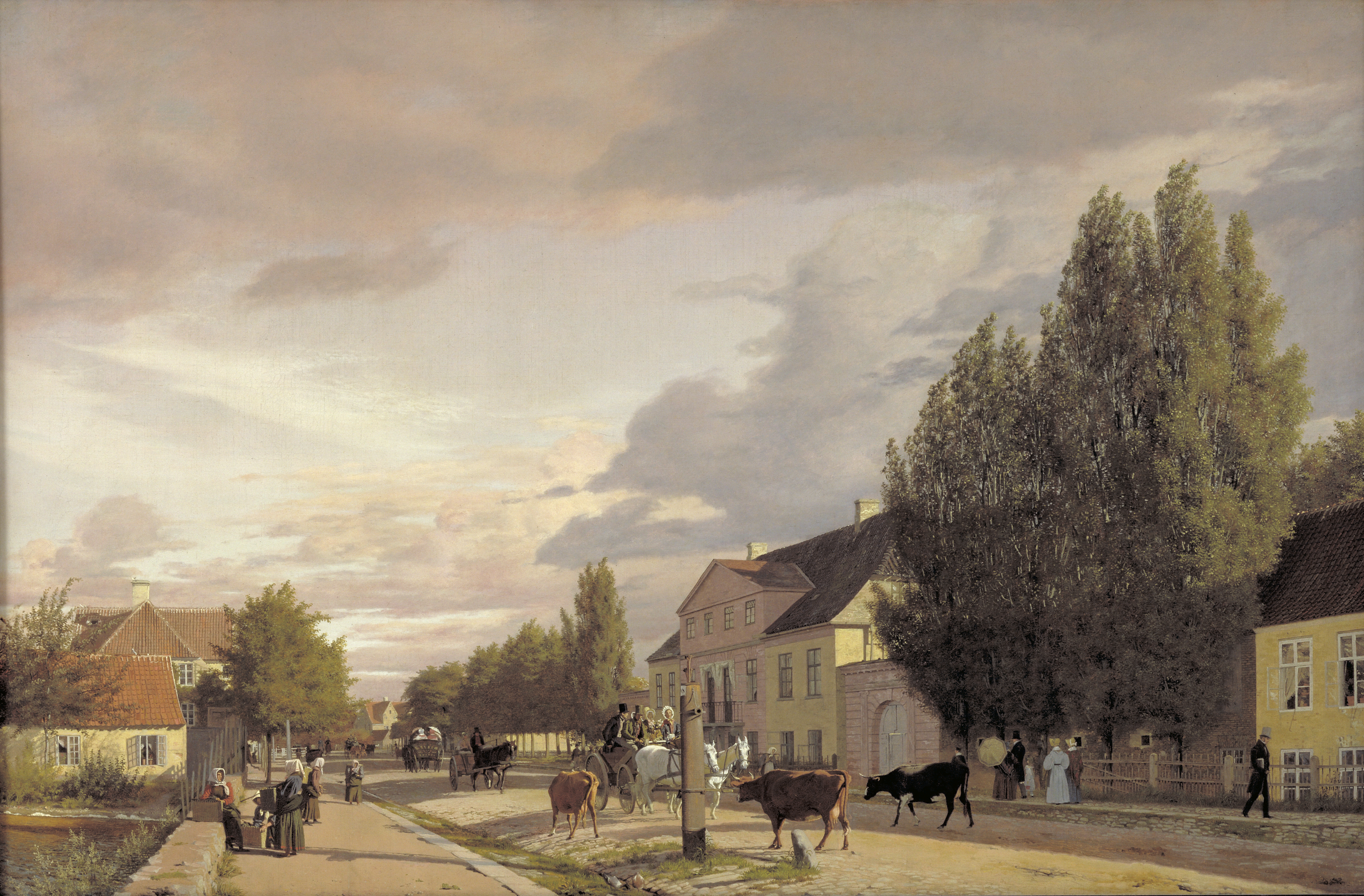
The beginning of Østerbrogade, painted by Christen Købke in 1836

The Garrison Cemetery and Holmen Cemetery were established on each side of the street in the 1660s.

The Vartov Complex was later replaced by the country house Sankt Petersburg (Saint Petersburg). Tsar Peter the Great stayed at the site during his visit to Copenhagen. Other country houses along the street included Tosendal and Søholm. Tosendal belonged to the wealthy merchant and shipowner Friederich Tutein-

=== Early urbanization, 1850–1900 ===
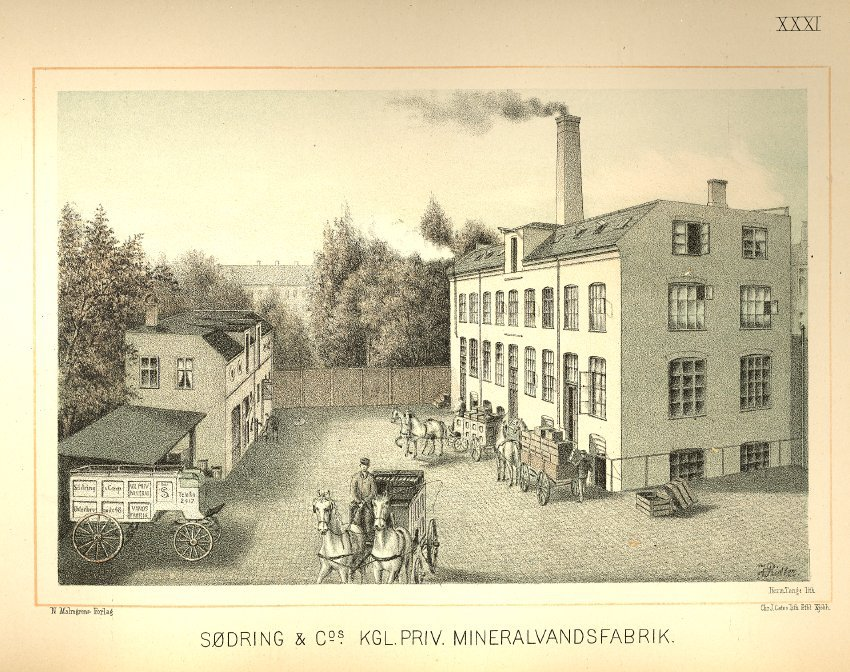
Sødring & Co.'s factory in 1888

After the city gate was dismantled in 1859 and the city was gradually allowed to develop beyond the old fortifications, still more of the old main road was included in Østerbrogade. The section between Jagtvej and Svanemøllen station was included in Østerbrogade in 1943.

Redevelopment of the area along the road began in 1854, when the Danish Medical Association built the Brumleby terraced houses to provide cheap and healthy housing for indigent workers. In 1857 the first apartment building was built at Trianglen.

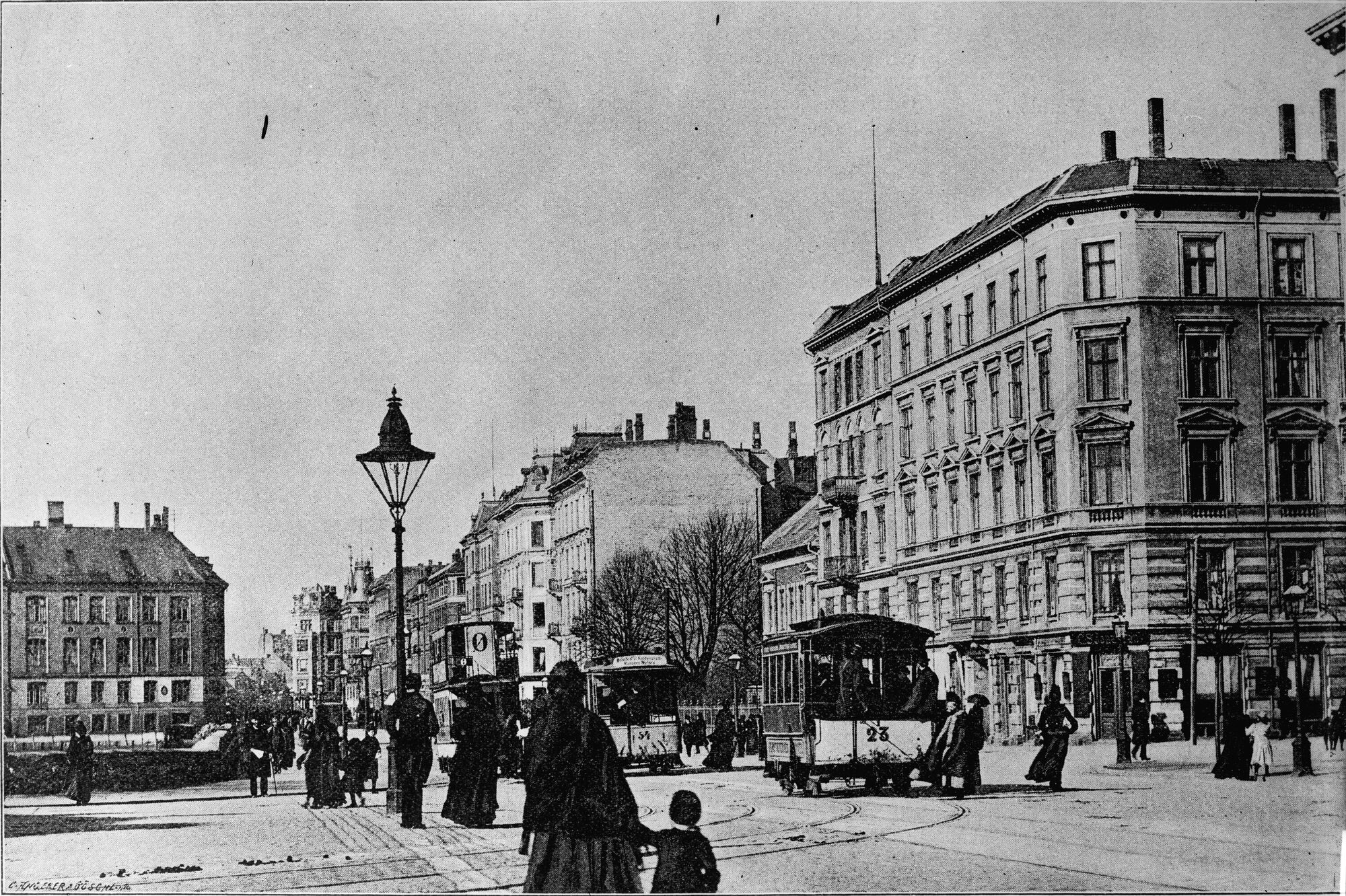
Østerbrogade viewed from Lille Triangel, c. 1899

In 1858, Mozart Waagepetersen began the transformation of the Rosendal estate into what is now known as the Rosenvænget neighbourhood of single-family detached homes.

The mineral water factory Sødring & Co. relocated to Østerbrogade No. 47 (now No. 70) in 1886. The company was established at Tabenshave in Christianshavn in 1855. It was later moved to Kompagnistræde 20 before constructing the new factory on Østerbrogade.

St. James' Church was built just north of Brumleby from 1872 to 1878. It was the first church in the emerging Østerbro district.

=== 20th century ===
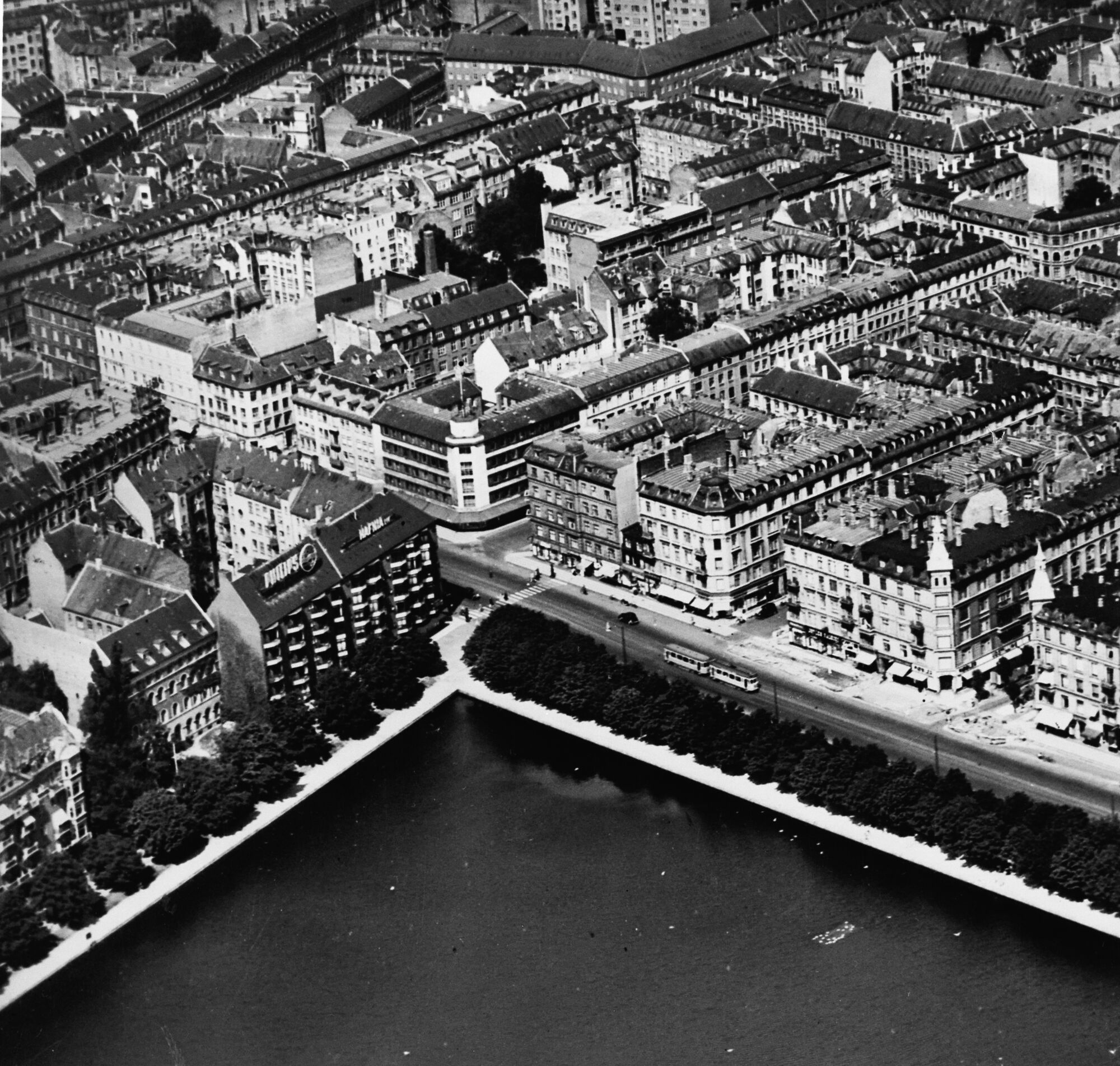
The corner of Østerbrogade and Sortedam Dossering, 1950. Modepalæet is seen in the centre.

Østerfælled Barracks was constructed on the west side of the street in the 1910s. Københavns Idrætspark was constructed on an adjacent site in the 1910s and 1920s.

Early Modernist buildings constructed along the street included Modepalæet and Østre Palæ.

In 1961, the part of Østerbrogade closest to the city centre, from Østerport Station to Lille Trianglen, was renamed Dag Hammarskjölds Allé but the continuous numbering was retained.

== Notable buildings and residents ==
The Triangel Teatret Building (Østerbrogade 70) is a former cinema from 1929. The design company Normann Copenhagen opened a flagship store at Østerbrogade 70, overlooking the junction. It was listed as one of !"12 Treasures of Europe" by The New York Times in 2014.

Skt Petersborg (No. 74) is an apartment building constructed in 1888–90 to designs by the architect Ferdinand Vilhelm Jensen. The building replaced the country house of the same name.

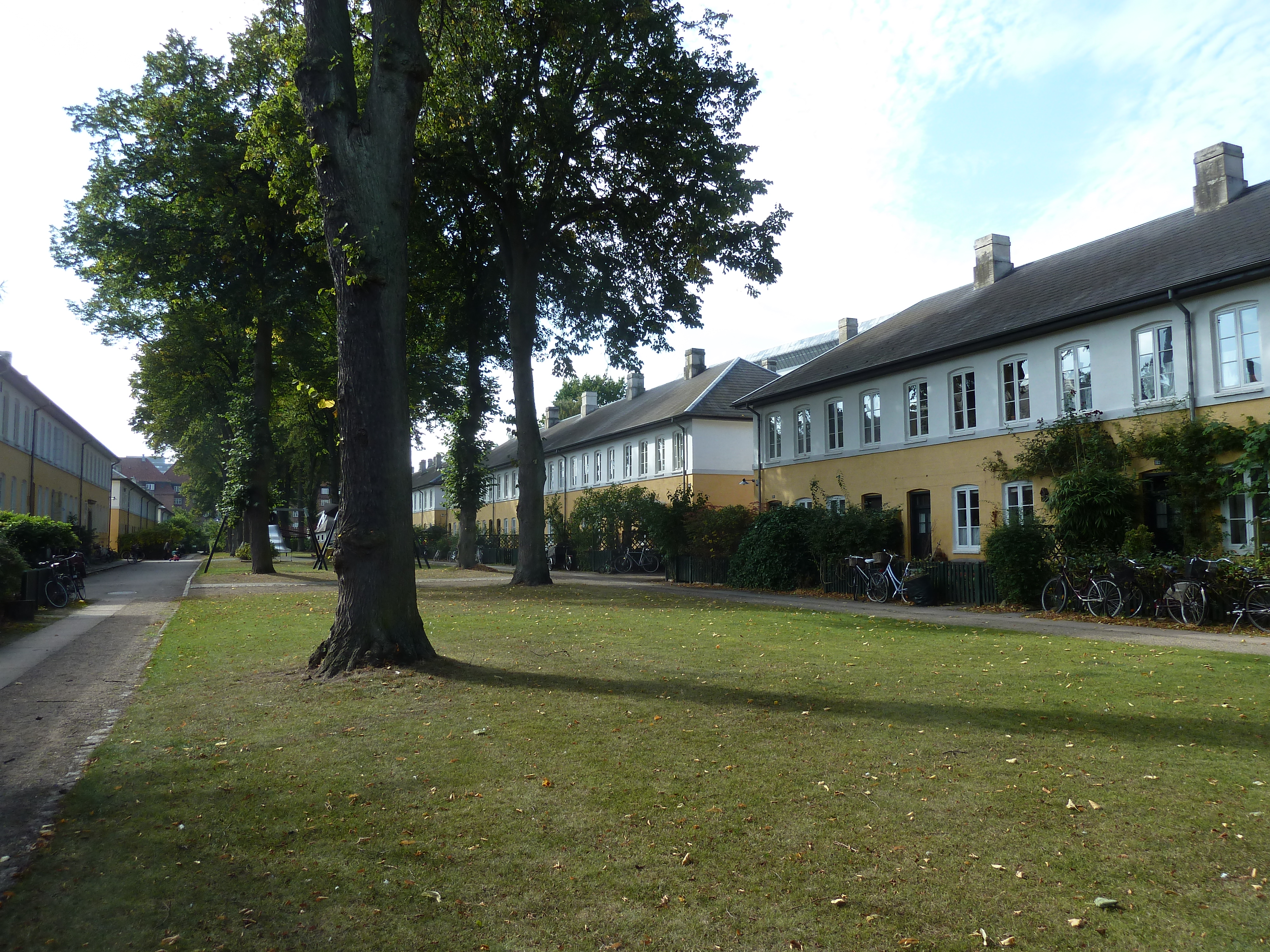
Brumleby

Brumleby (No. 55A) is an enclave of terraced houses built in two stages in 1854–1872. These are the oldest surviving buildings in Østerbro. Built for indigent workers by the Danish Medical Association, it is one of the earliest examples of social housing in Denmark and became a model for later projects. The oldest part of the development was designed by Michael Gottlieb Bindesbøll. The second stage was designed by Vilhelm Klein to a design which closely resembled that of Bindesbøll's earlier buildings. Klein also designed Crown Princess Louise's Asylum, an asylum for children, fronting the street (No. 57).

Next to Brumleby, on both sides of Olufgade, is one of the developments of the Workers' Co-Operative Building Society. It consists of 49 terraced houses built from 1874 a 1877 to a design by Frederik Bøttger.

St James' Church (No. 59), Østerbro's first church, was completed in 1886 to a Neo-Gothic design by Ludvig Fenger.

The Neoclassical complex at the corner with Gunnar Nu Hansens Plads (No. 79) features the old main entrance to Østerbro Stadium. The tall gateway is topped a bronze cast of Alfred Boucher's 1885 group sculpture Au but. The interior walls of the gateway are decorated with two reliefs by Axel Poulsen. The gateway is flanked by the cinema Park Bio to the left and the Øbro-Hallen indoor swimming venue to the right (Gunnar Nu Hansens Plads 1-3). The building complex was constructed in the 1930s to designs by Wittmaack og Hvalsøe.

Østerfælled Torv is a result of a redevelopment of the former Østerfælled Barracks into a mixed-use development surrounding a public space.

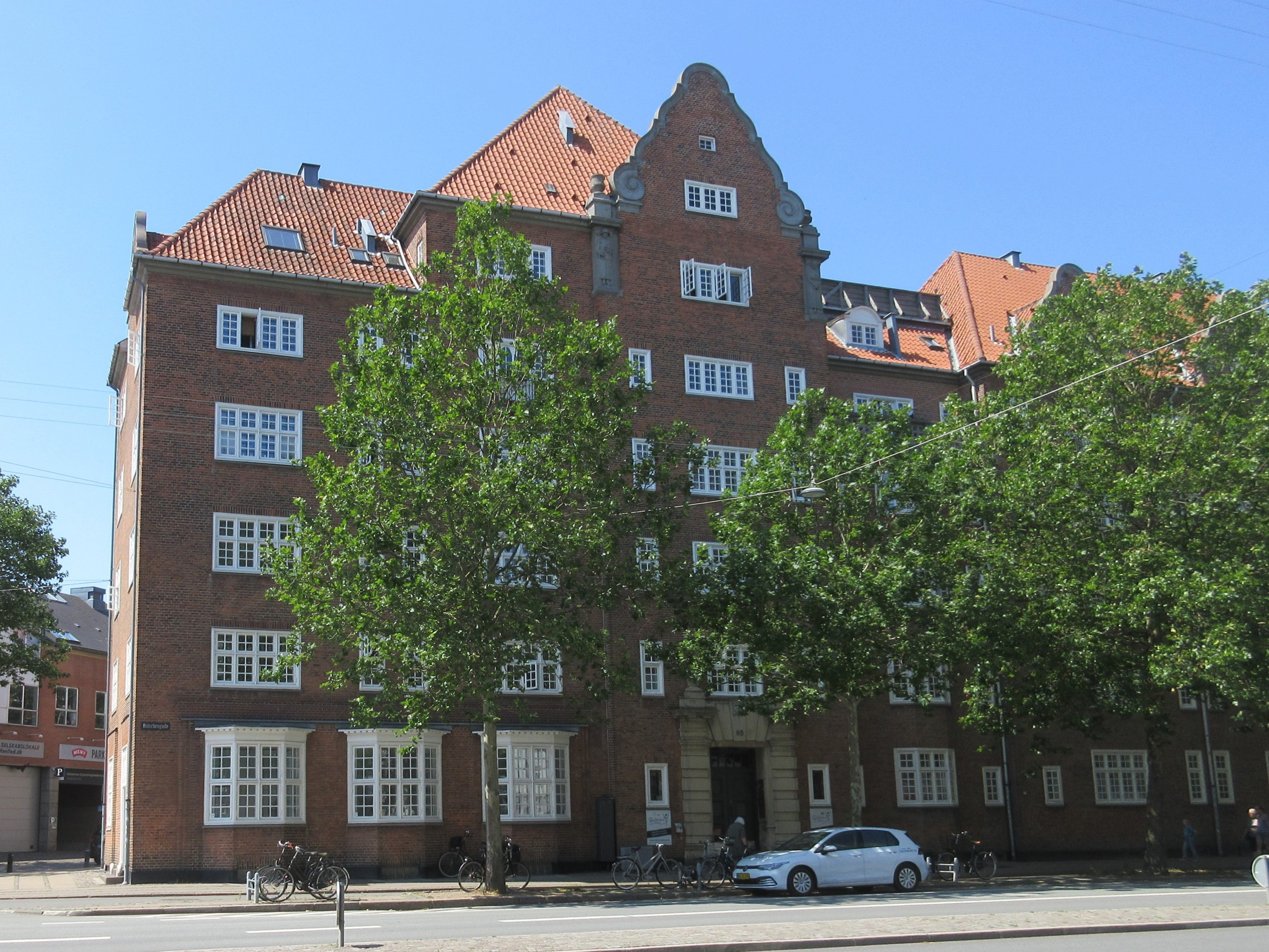
No. 85: Clara Raphael's House

Clara Raphael's House (No. 85) was constructed in 1918–1920 by the Women's Building Society. It takes its name from Mathilde Fibiger's debut nobel. The Women's Building Society (Kvindernes Byggeforening) was founded by Thora Daugaard, Thora Davidsen and Julie Laurberg. The building contained 150 small dwellings for single, self-supporting women.

Store Jakobsborg (No. 104–106) is a high-end apartment building from 1904. It was designed by the architect Philip Smidth, who also designed the building Svanegård on nearby Sankt Jakobs Plads.

At the corner of Østerbrogade and Jagtvej stands one of A/S Københavns Telefonkiosker's former telephone kiosks. It is one of few examples of the original, slender kiosk design by Fritz Koch. The building is heritage listed.

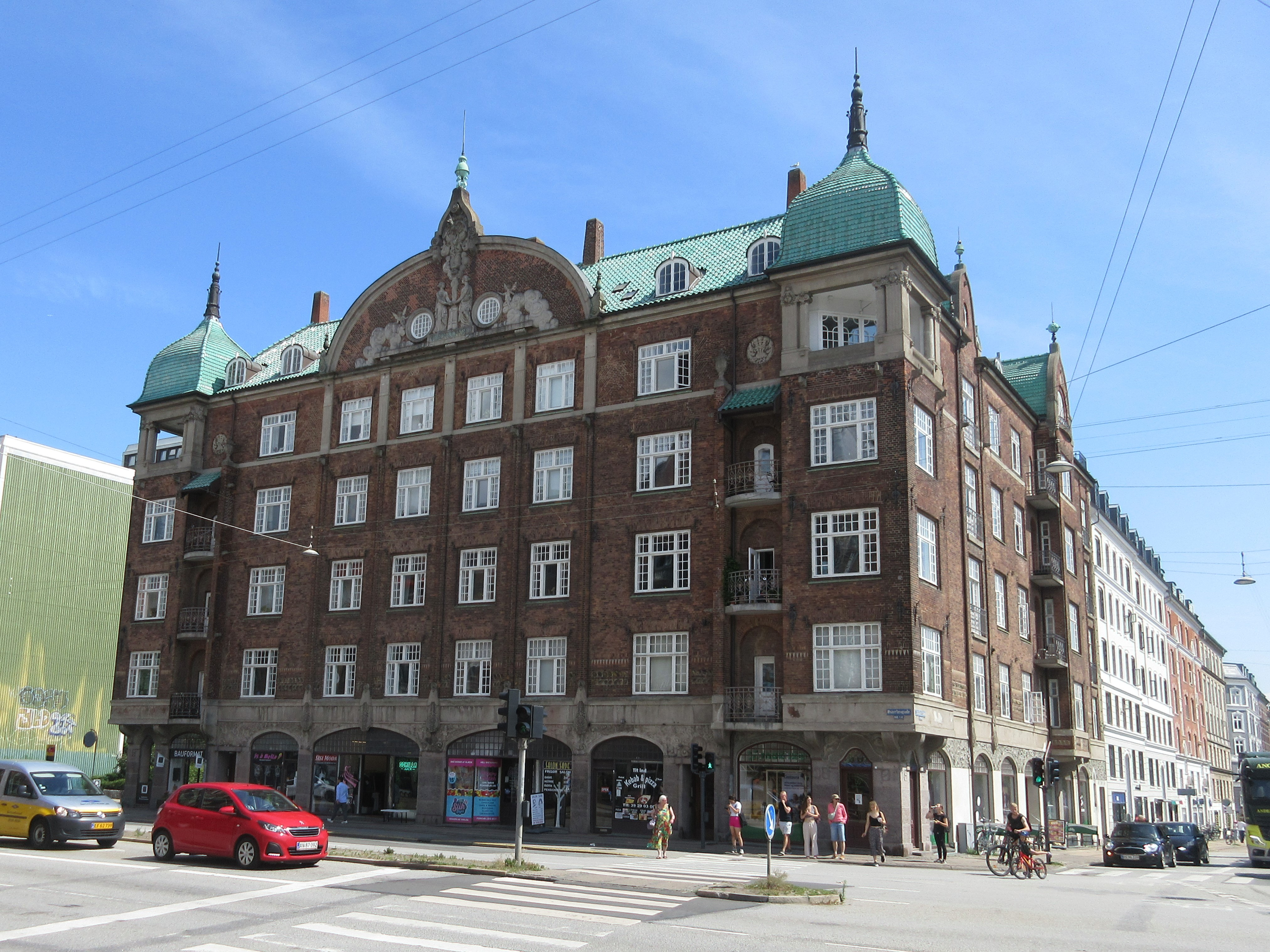
No. 158–160: Vibensgaard

Vibensgaard (No. 158–160) is a high-end Art Nouveau-style apartment building at the corner of Østerbrogade and Strandboulevarden. The building was constructed from 1903–1905 to designs by Anton Rosen and Peter Neerskov. It was heritage listed in 1987.

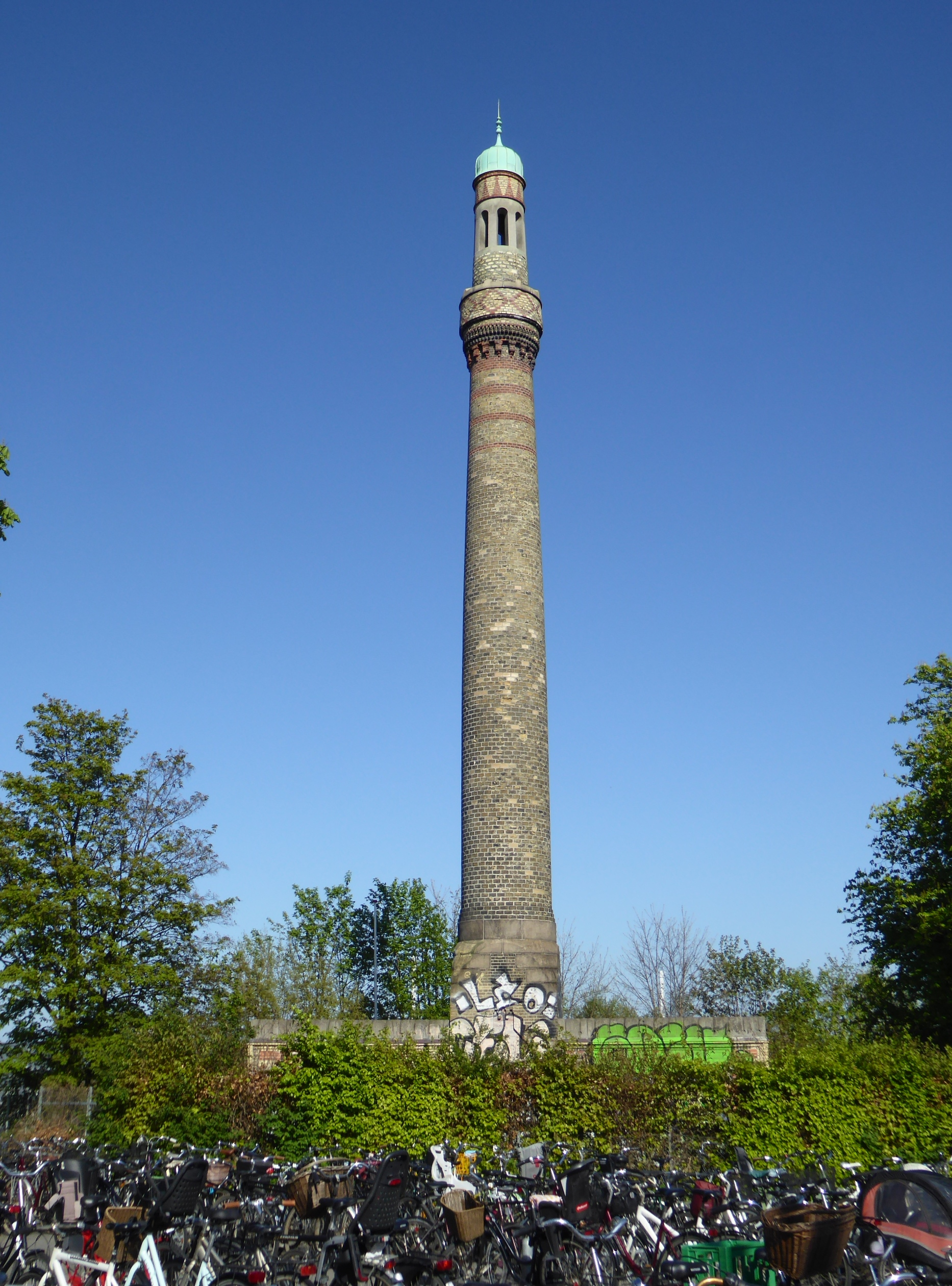
Svanemøllen Pumping Station

Zion's Church (No. 192) is located near the northern end of the street. The building was constructed in 1806 to designs by Valdemar Koch. The tower was added in 1921. It was designed by Kristian Varming.

Svanemøllen Station (No. 246) was inaugurated in 1924. Next to the station stands the decommissioned Svanemøllen Pumping Station. The building is constructed in yellow brick with decorative bands of red brick. The tall, minaret-like ventilation chimney serves as a local landmark. The building was constructed in 1906–1907 to designs by city architect Hans Wright. Next to the railway station and the pumping station stands a half-timbered single-storey building (No. 242) with red-painted timber framing and yellow-painted infills. It was originally used by tramway personnel.

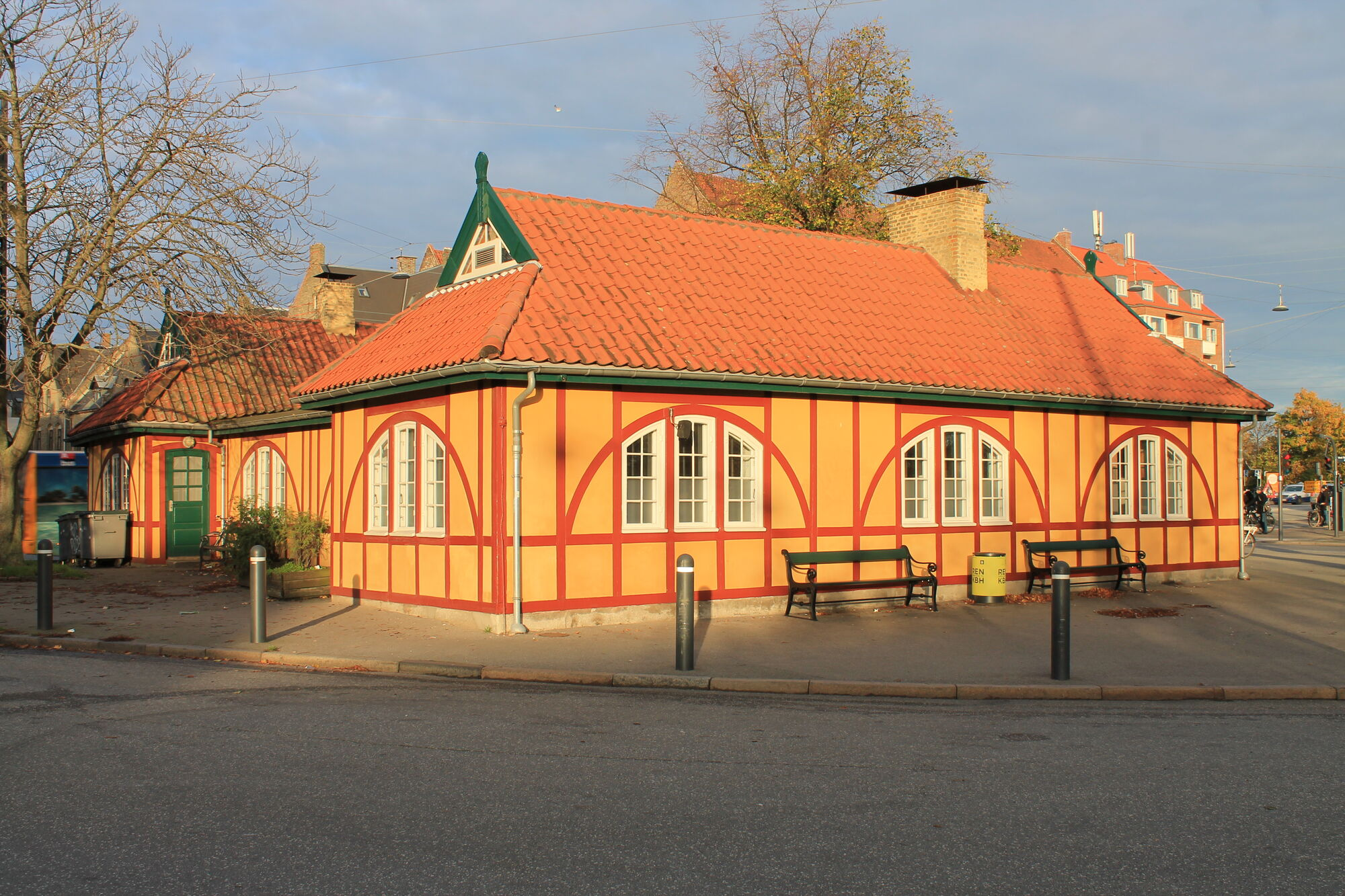
No. 242: former tramway building

Opposite Svanemøllen Station is another enclave of terraced houses built by the Workers' Co-Operative Building Society. The 392 townhouses were built between 1892 and 1903 to an updated design by Frederik Bøttger. The development is known as the Composers' Quarter due to the fact the streets are named for Nordic composers. It is also referred to as the Kildevæl Quarter, Strandvej Quarter and Svanemølle Quarter.

== Monuments and memorials ==
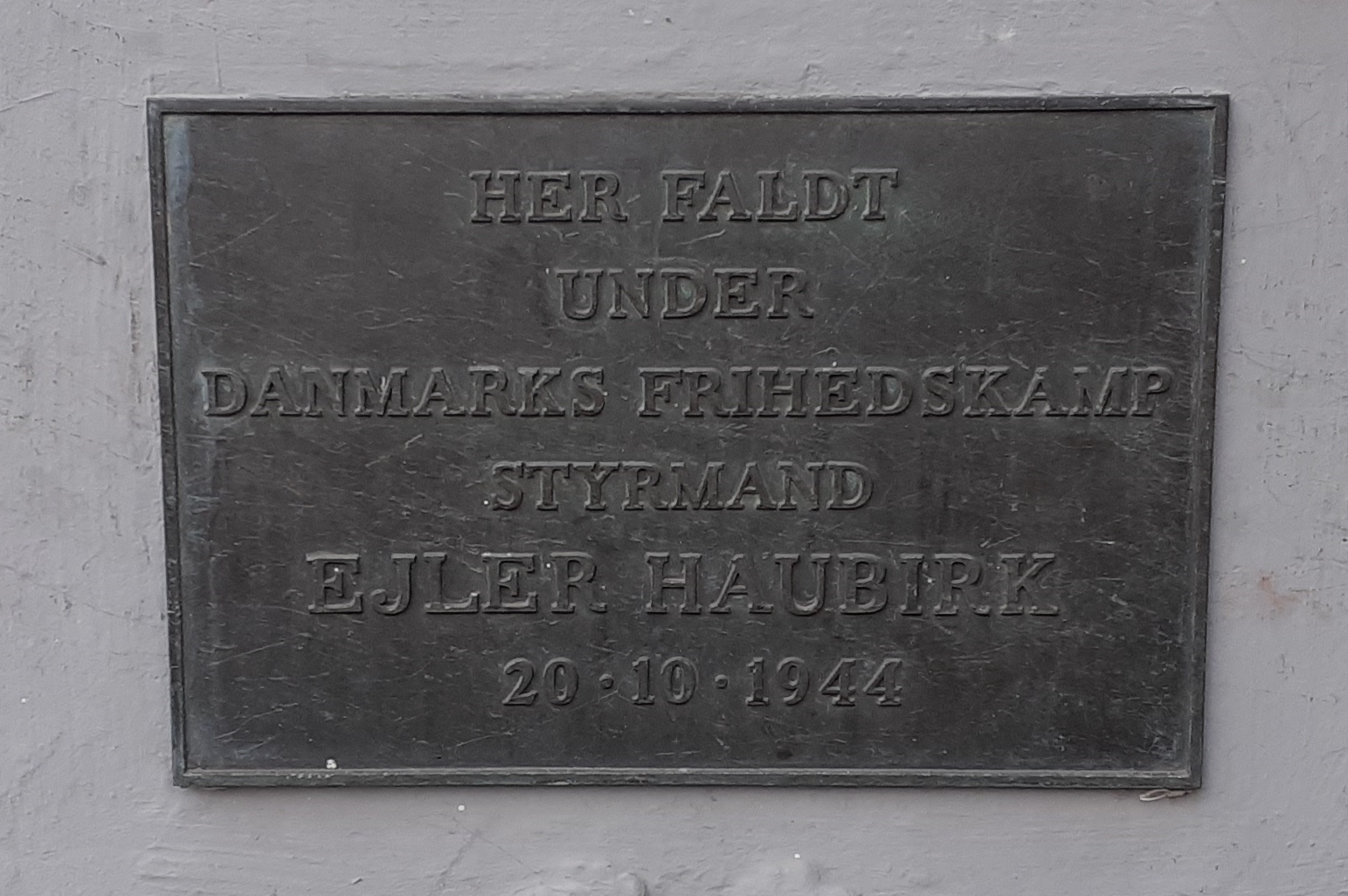
No. No. 72: Ejler Haubirk commemorative plaque

In the garden complex at Poul Henningsens Plads stands Jens Lund's sculpture Authymn (Forår). It was installed in 1895.

A plaque at No. 72: Hjørneejendom commemorates that the resistance fighter Ejler Haubirk was shot at the site in 1944.

== Transport ==
The street is served by two metro stations, Trianglen Station at Trianglen and Poul Henningsens Plads station at Jagtvej. Svanemøllen Station at the northern end of the street is served by S-trains.
