= Hertz Garveri & Skotøjsfabrik =

Former Danish tannery and shoe factory

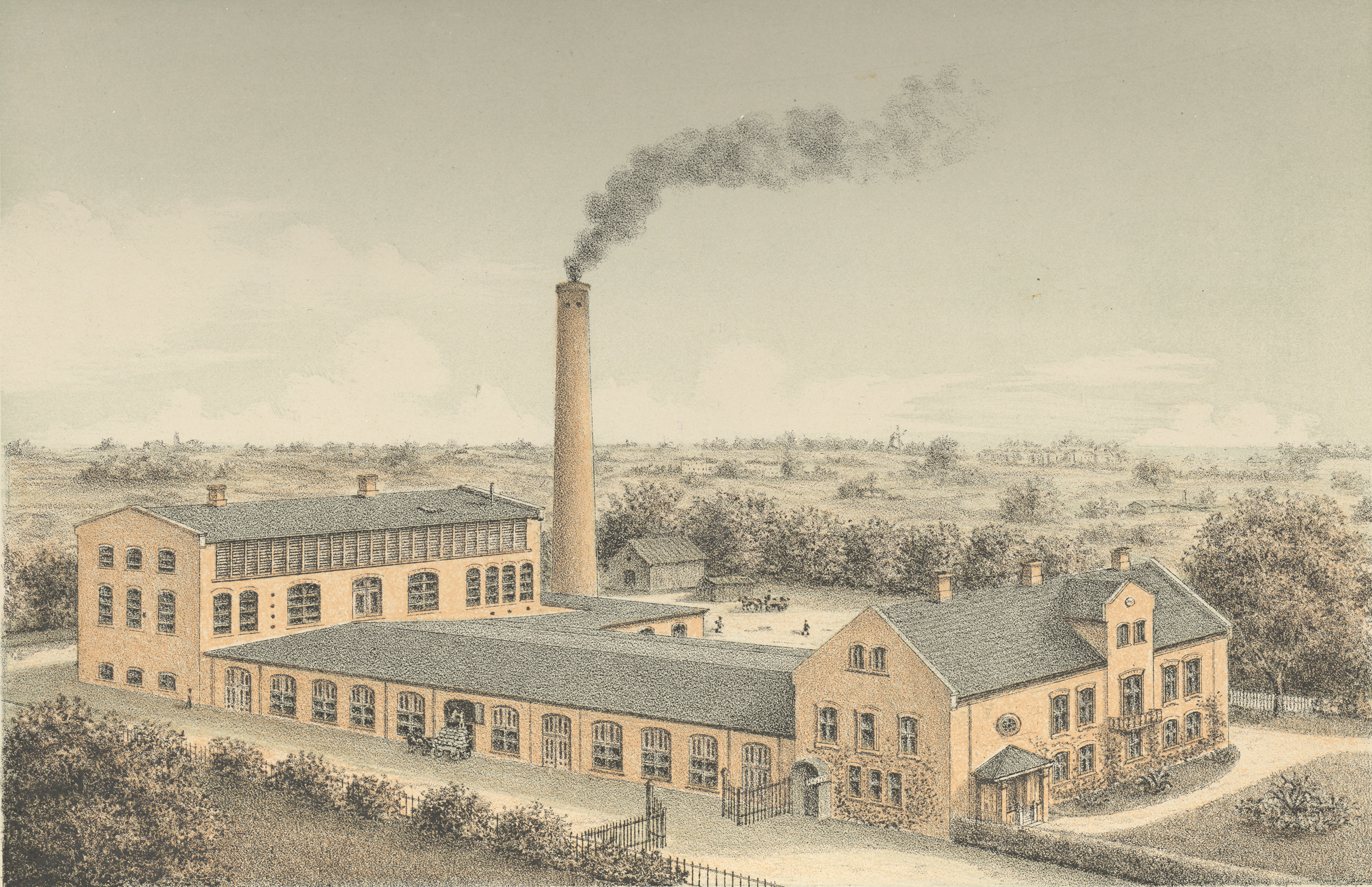
Meyer Hertz' tannery and shoeware factory

Hertz Garveri & Skotøjsfabrik was a Danish tannery and shoeware factory based at Jagtvej 211 in Copenhagen, Denmark.

== History ==
The company was founded as a tannery on 4 December 1821 by Abraham Hertz (1800–1875). It was initially located at Prinsensgade No. 7, a small street between Adelgade and Borgergade which is no longer in existence. In 1832, it relocated to new premises at Rosenborggade No. 5. In 1869, he ceded it to his son Meyer Hertz (born 1836).

The company was converted into a limited company (aktieselskab) in 1897. The shoeware factory opened in 1898. It acquired Københavns Fodtøjsfabrik from M. Goldstein in 1905. The company was headquartered at Citygade 22 in 1910. The factory was situated at Jagtvej 211.

The company merged with M. J. Ballins Sønner and a number in 1919.
