= Julie Laurberg =

Danish photographer (1856–1925)

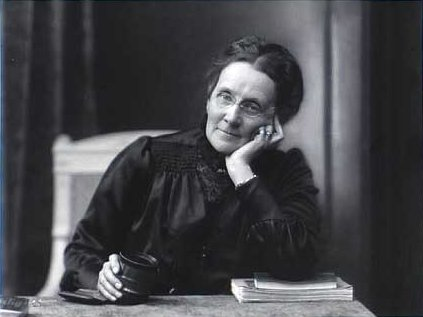
Julie Laurberg (1918)

Julie Rasmine Marie Laurberg (7 September 1856 – 29 June 1925) was an early Danish photographer who, together with Franziska Gad (1873–1921), ran a successful photography business in central Copenhagen.

== Early life and education ==
Born in Grenå, Laurberg trained under the painter and photographer Leopold Hartmann before continuing her studies in Paris and Italy.

== Career ==
In 1895, she opened her own studio in the new Magasin du Nord building in central Copenhagen where she worked with her former pupil Franziska Gad. From 1907, when Gad became an official partner in her business, the studio became widely recognized, attracting well-to-do personalities to have their portraits taken. One of her most notable portraits is that of opera singer Margrethe Lendrop which was widely published as a post-card engraving known as Julie L. & Gad. In 1910 the firm received the status of royal court photographer.

Laurberg's architectural photographs were also appreciated, in particular those of the new goodsyard and the hall in the City Hall building. Between 1908 and 1910, she also took photographs of Christian IX's Palace at Amalienborg, many of which have been preserved as large prints.

== Women's rights ==
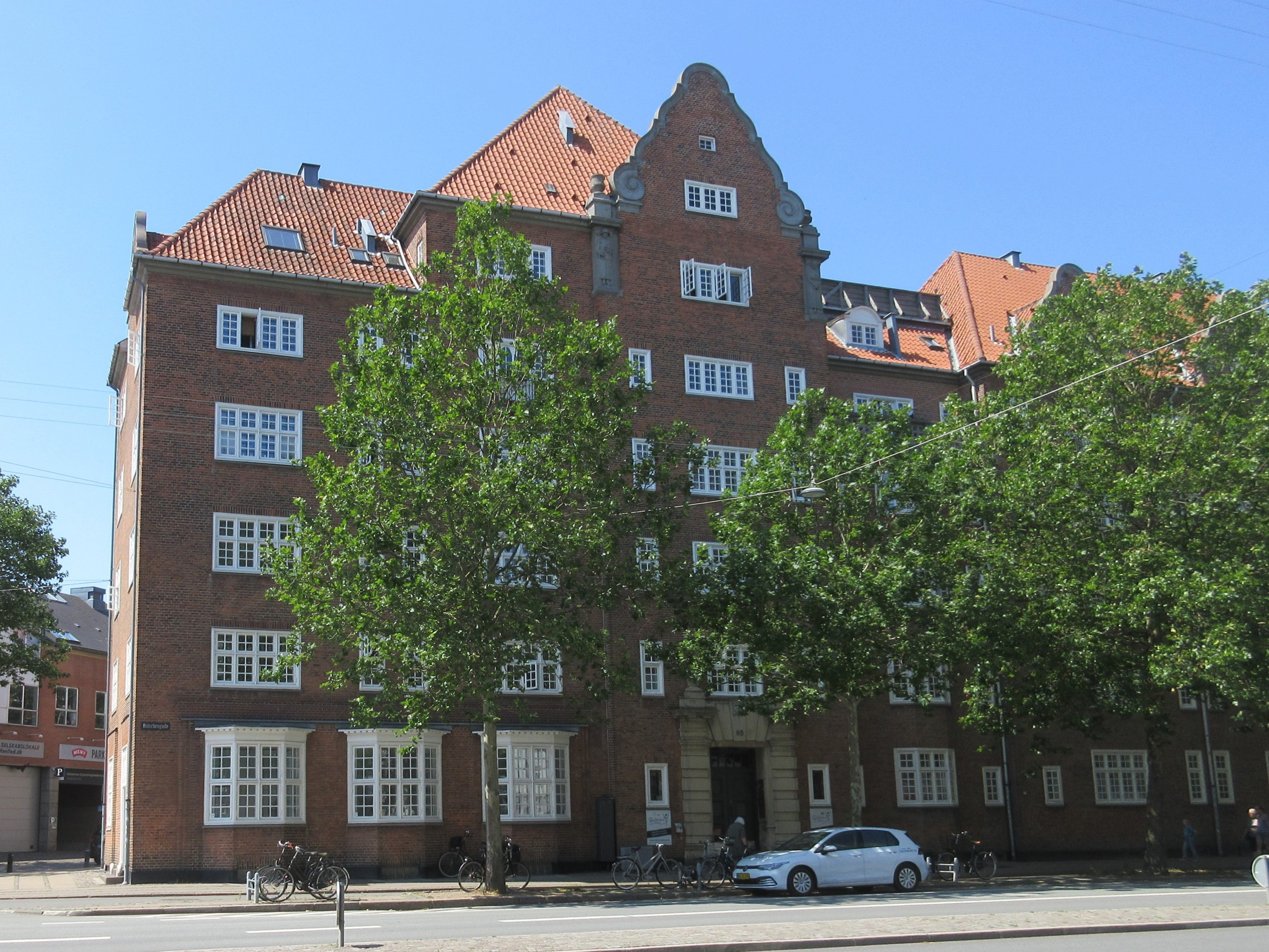
The Women's Dwellings Association's building at Østerbrogade 85 in Copenhagen.

Laurberg was also active in women's rights. She was a member of the Danish Women's Society (Dansk Kvindesamfund) and, in 1920, a founding member of the Women's Dwellings Association (Kvindernes Boligselskab). She also gave support to the role of women in photography which was becoming a popular profession for women at the time. Those working in her large photographic business were nearly all women.

The association constructed a building with 150 small dwellings for single, self-supporting women at Østerbrogade 85 in Copenhagen. The building was given the name Clara Raphael's House after the eponymous protagonist of Mathilde Fibiger's debut novel.

Laurberg's photographic studio relocated to the Women's Dwellings Association's building at Østerbrogade 95. It was continued as Julie Laurberg & Gad's Eftf., after her death. It was still located in the building in 1950.

== Death ==
She died on 29 June 1925 and is buried in Assistens Cemetery.
