= Jagtvej =

Street in Copenhagen Municipality, Denmark

Coordinates: 55.6958°N 12.5505°E

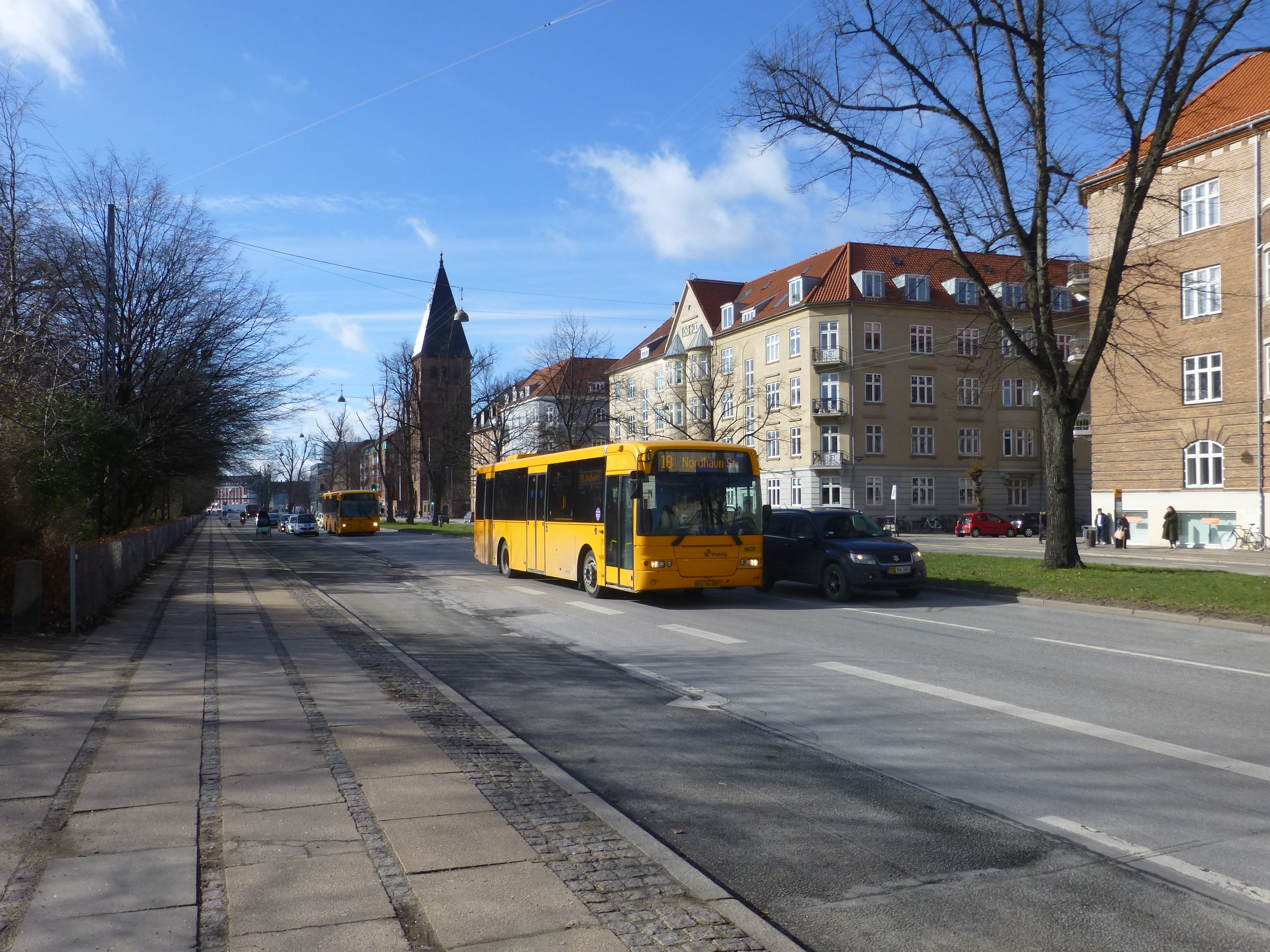
The wide, northern part of Jagtvej

Jagtvej (lit. 'Hunt Road') is a major artery in the Nørrebro and Østerbro districts of Copenhagen, Denmark. It runs from Ågade on the border with Frederiksberg in the southwest to Østerbrogade in the northeast, linking Falkoner Allé with Strandboulevarden. The street passes Assistens Cemetery, University of Copenhagen's North Campus and Fælledparken.

== History ==
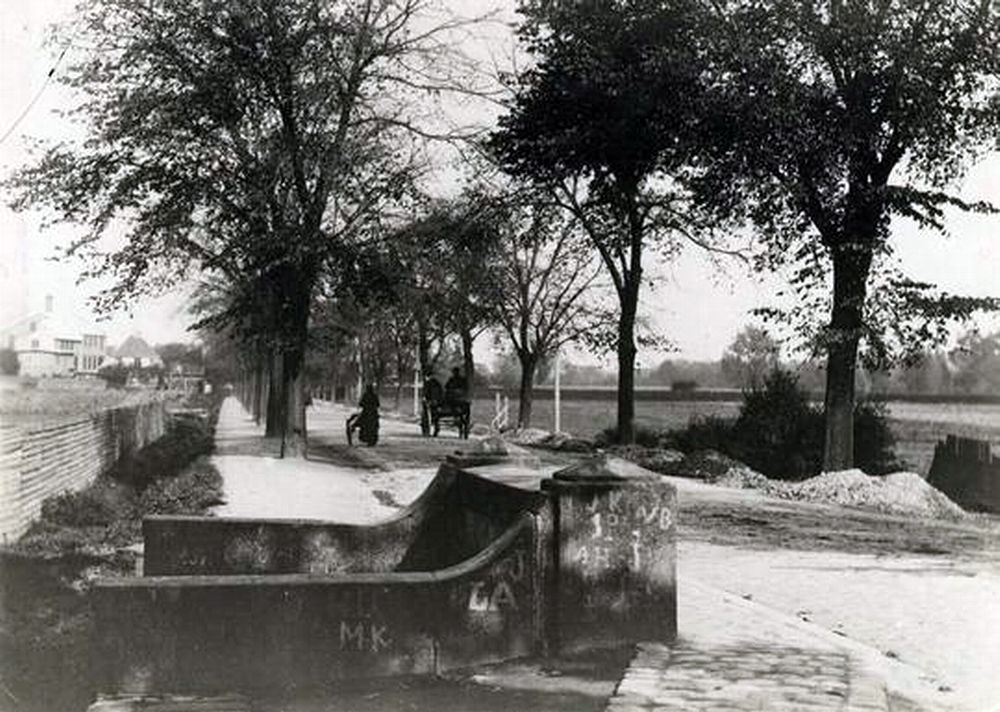
Jagtvej viewed from the same bridge in about 1880

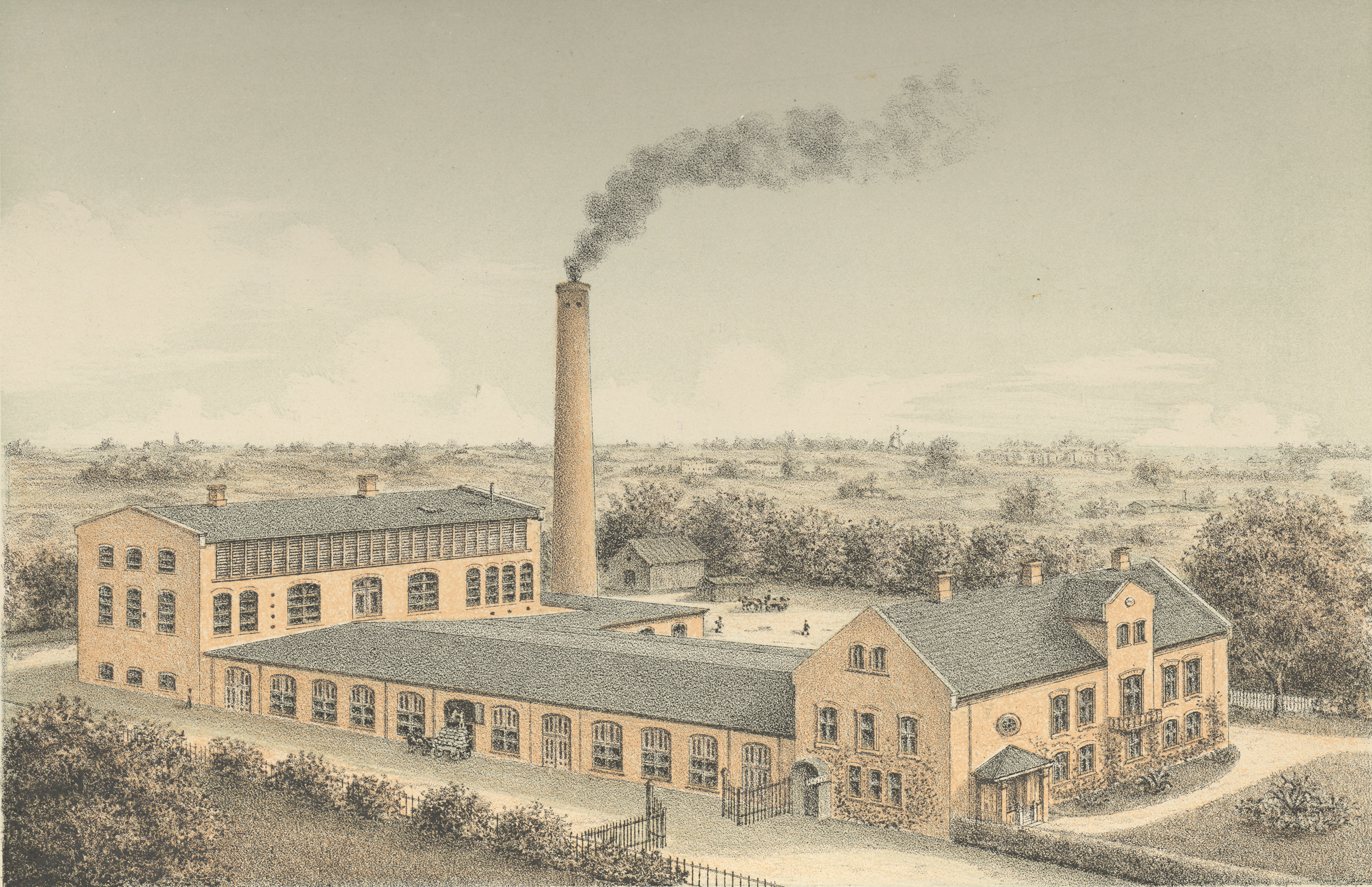
Meyer Hertz' tannery and shoeware factory

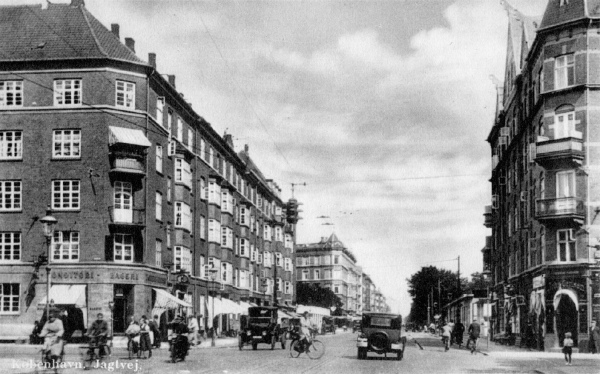
Jagtvej viewed from present-day Nuuks Plads in the 1900s

The road originates in a track which was established in the 1660s to enable royal hunting parties to travel more easily from Frederiksberg Palace to Jægersborg Deer Garden and Frederiksborg Castle in North Zealand. The so-called Demarcation Line, which enforced a no-built zone outside Copenhagen's fortifications, was moved to the track in 1682. In 1750, it was expanded into a larger, tree-lined road which was used for royal hunts. Riders would wait for signal at Nørrebro Runddel (Nørrebro Circle). The road extended from the Royal Falconry and was initially reserved for members of the royal court but later in the century opened to the public.

The Demarcation Line was moved to The Lakes in 1852 and Jagtvej was subsequently built over in second half of the 19th century. Meyer Hertz moved his tannery and shoeware factory to Jagtvej (No. 211) in 1875. The railway crossing on the street disappeared in 1930.

== Notable buildings and residents ==
The former home of the Regional Archives for Zealand, Lolland–Falster and Bornholm (No. 10) is located at Nuuks Plads. The oldest part of the complex was built in the National Romantic style by Martin Nyrop in 1891–93. There are plans to redevelop the site with youth housing.

The primary school Nørrebro Park Skole (No. 34) is located at Assistens Cemetery. The school was formerly called Jagtvejens Skole. It was built at the site was built in 1888 to design by Ludvig Fenger. The school was most recently expanded and received its current name in 2008.

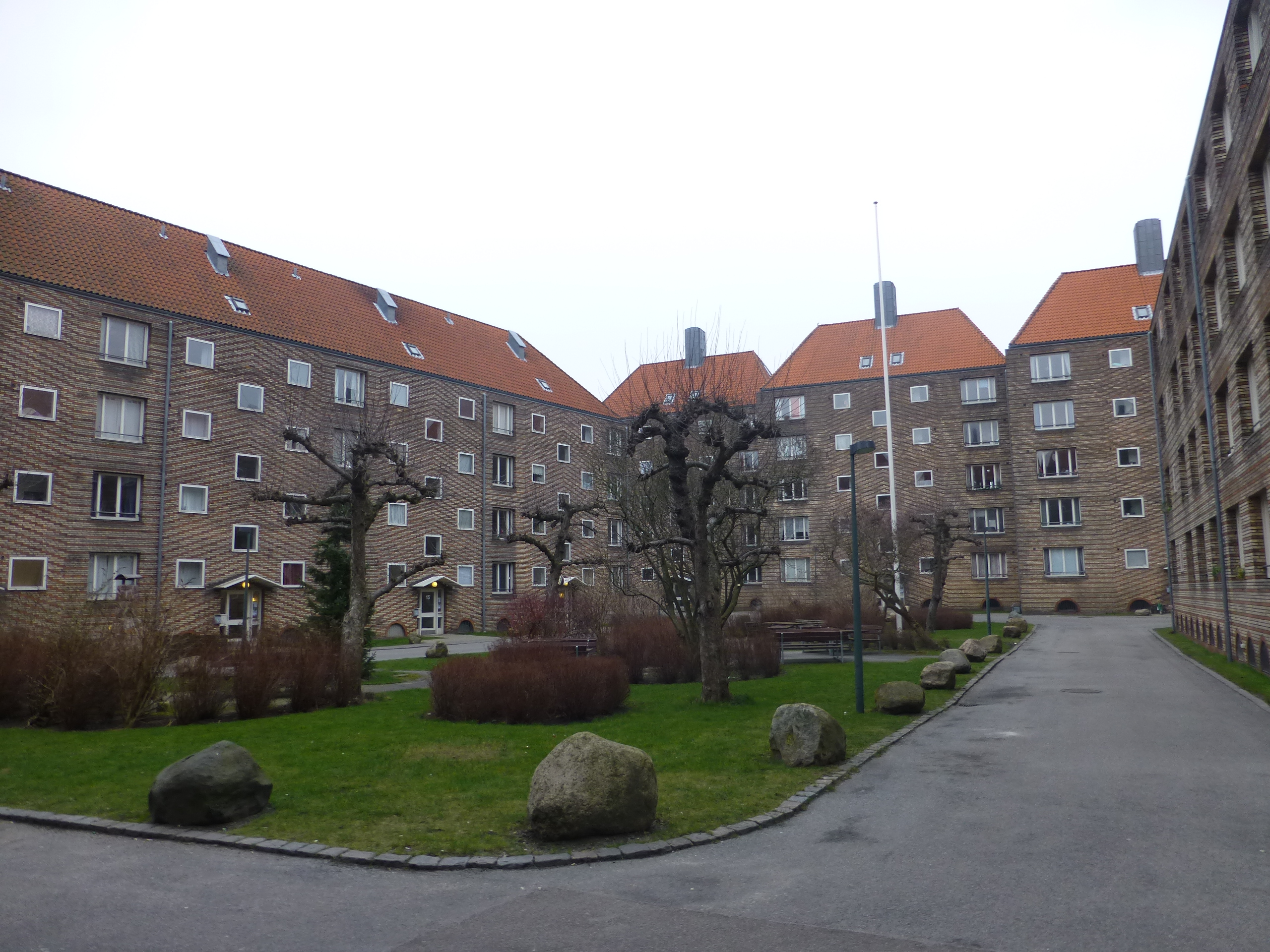
Fogedgården

Fogedgården and Fogedmarken are residential developments for senior citizens built in the 1940s to design by Kay Fisker and C. F. Møller.

Rigshospitalets Kollegium (No. 120) us a dormitory associated Rigshospitalet. The street then passes Vibenshus Rundelpasses University of Copenhagen's University Park, part of its North Campus. The under construction Niels Nohr Building will span the street with a long skywalk. Other buildings located directly on the street include the Museum of Zoology and the August Krogh Building.

NEXT EDU, formerly Copenhagen Technical College, has a building at No. 163. The building is from 1941 and was built for Københavns Tekniske Skole to design by Henning Hansen. Taksigelseskirken (No. 165) isa Church of Denmark parish church. It is from 1927 and was designed by Frederik Kiørboe.

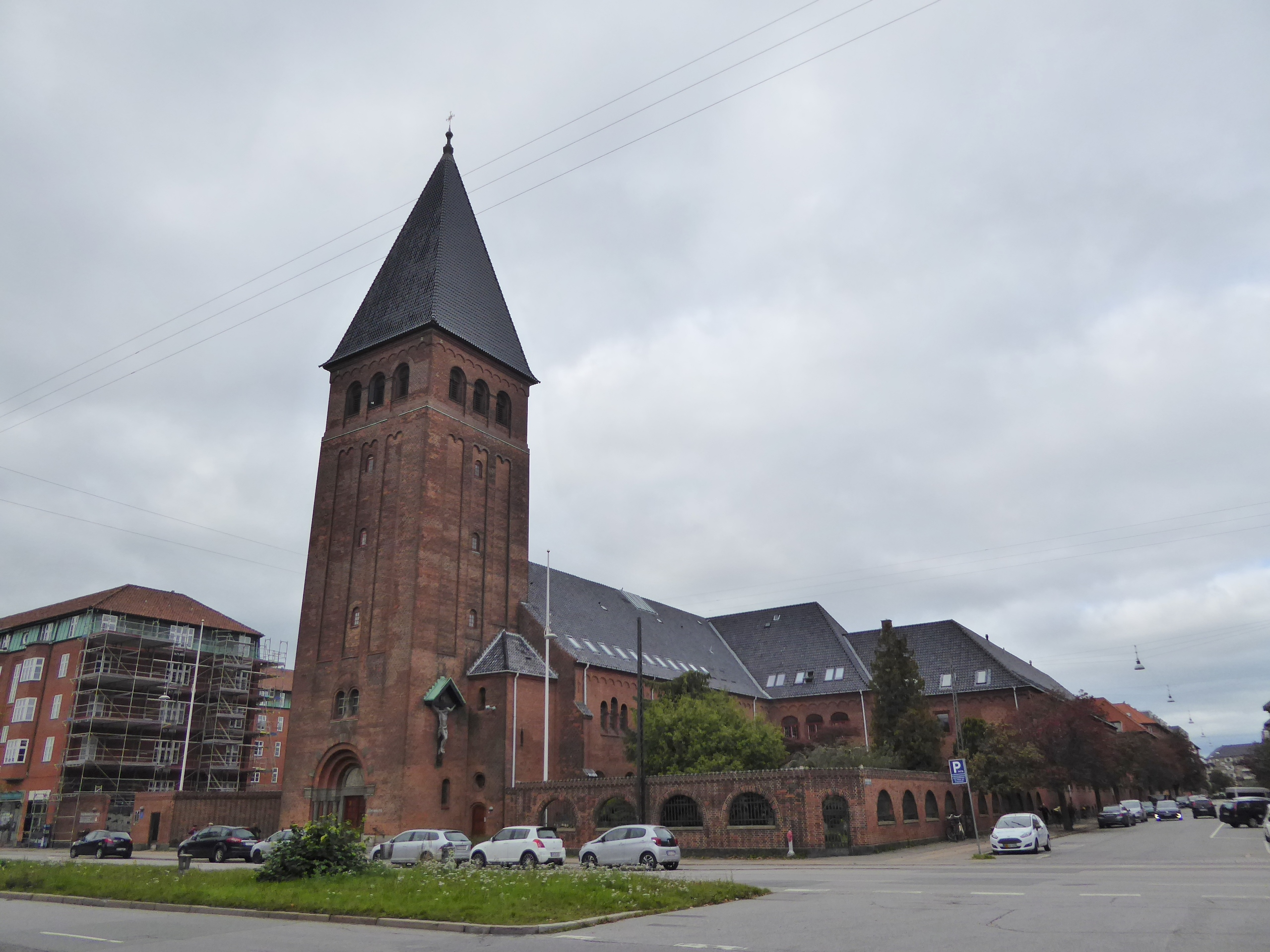
St. Augustine's Church

The Roman Catholic St. Augustine's Church was completed in 1915 to design by Emil Jørgensen. The complex also contained a convent which now houses Niels Steensens Gymnasium, a Catholic upper secondary school, and a hall of residence.

The listed housing block Kanslergården (Borgmester Jensens Allé 1-5/Jagtvej 200/Serridslevvej/Kanslergade) is from 1918 to 1919 and was designed by Henning Hansen. Kanslerhus (No. 202-208: Kanslerhus, Jagtvej/Kanslergade) is designed in a somewhat similar style. Meyer Hertz' former shoeware factory was demolished in 1987 and replaced by a Postmodern housing development called Garvergården (No. 211) designed by Tegnestuen Vandkunsten. It reuses a few elements from the industrial complex.

== Transport ==
Copenhagen Metro's operated City Circle Line has three underground stations along the road. They are located at Nuuks Plads, Nørrebro Runddel and Poul Henningsens Plads.

The Nørrebro Route of Copenhagen's super bikeway system crosses Jagtvej just south of Nørrebro Park Skole.

== See also ==
- Hertz Garveri & Skotøjsfabrik
