= St. James's Church, Copenhagen =

St. James's Church
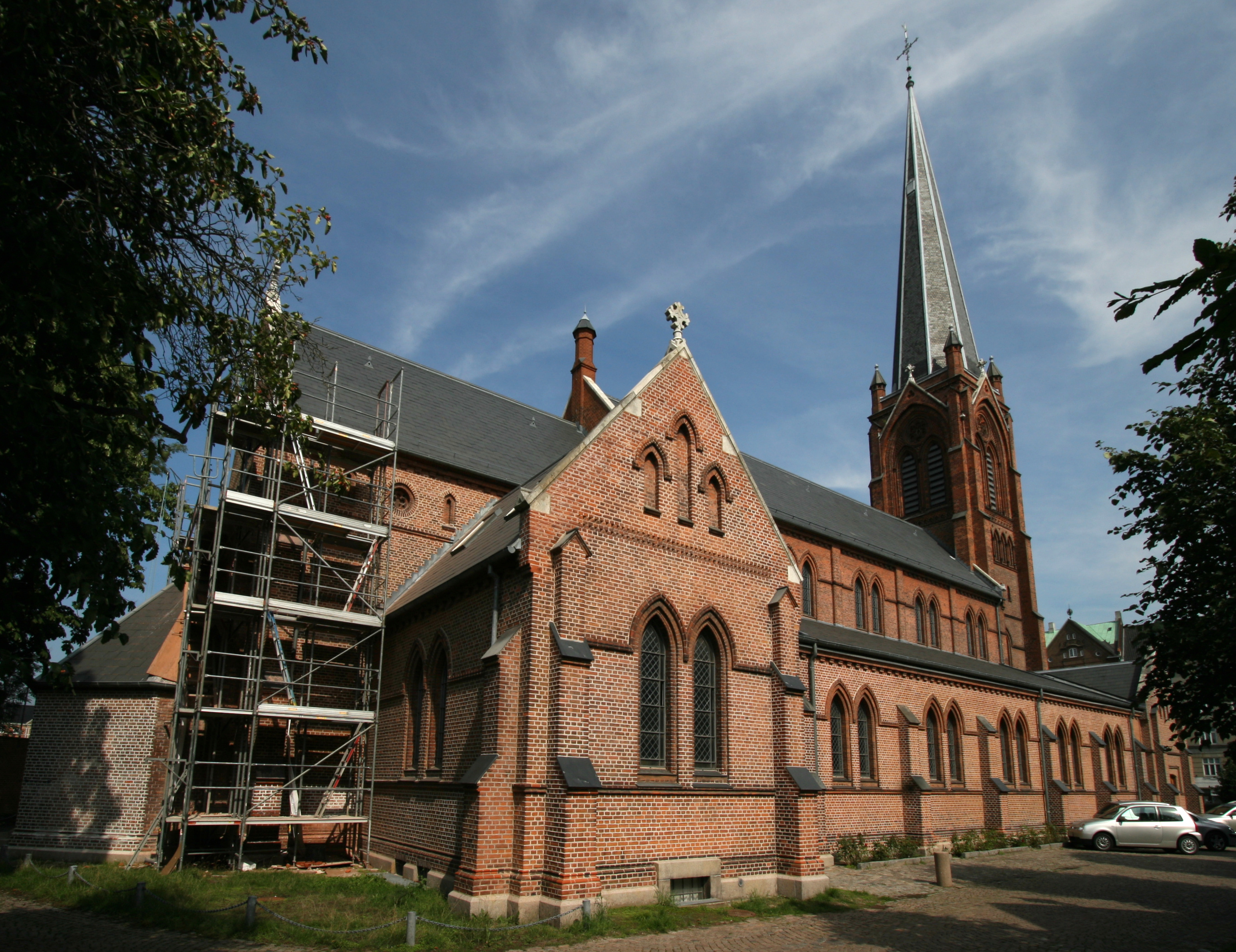
- St. James's Church
- St. James's Church
- 55°42′12.6″N 12°34′35″E
- Location: 59 Østerbrogade; Østerbro, Copenhagen
- Country: Denmark
- Denomination: Church of Denmark
- Website: www.sanktjakobskirke.dk (in Danish)

History
- Status: Church

Architecture
- Architect: Ludvig Fenger
- Architectural type: Church
- Style: Neo-Gothic
- Groundbreaking: 1876
- Completed: 1878

Specifications
- Materials: Brick

Administration
- Archdiocese: Diocese of Copenhagen

St. James's Church (Danish: Sankt Jakobs Kirke) in the Østerbro district of Copenhagen, Denmark, was the first church to be built in the district. It was designed by Ludvig Fenger in a Neo-Gothic style and built between 1876 and 1878.

== History ==
Completed in 1856, St. John's Church in Nørrebro was the first church to be built in Copenhagen outside the city's Bastioned Fortifications after it was decided to decommission them and allow the city to expand. Its first pastor, Rudolf Frimodt, launched a campaign for more new churches in fast-growing new neighbourhoods which, over the course of seven years, from 1874 to 1880, led to four new churches. St. James's was the second of these churches to be completed and the first church to be built in Østerbro. Its architect was Ludvig Fenger, who also designed St. Mathew's in Vesterbro which was completed just two years later. Construction of St. James's began in 1876 and the church was completed in 1878. The site was still relatively sparsely developed but among the buildings in the area was the Brumleby terraces, Denmark's first example of social housing, which had been built between 1854 and 1872.

== Architecture ==
The church is built to a Neo-Gothic design with inspiration from English architecture. It is constructed in red brick. A relief above the main entrance depicts Saint James with a scallop shell, his emblem.

== St. James's today ==
The church belongs to Church of Denmark and remains the largest church in Østerbro. It lies a little recessed from Østerbrogade and is today located close to Parken and Østerbro Stadiums. The church is open to visitors every day from 9—13.

== See also ==
- Sankt Jakobs Plads
