= Strandboulevarden =

Street in Copenhagen, Denmark

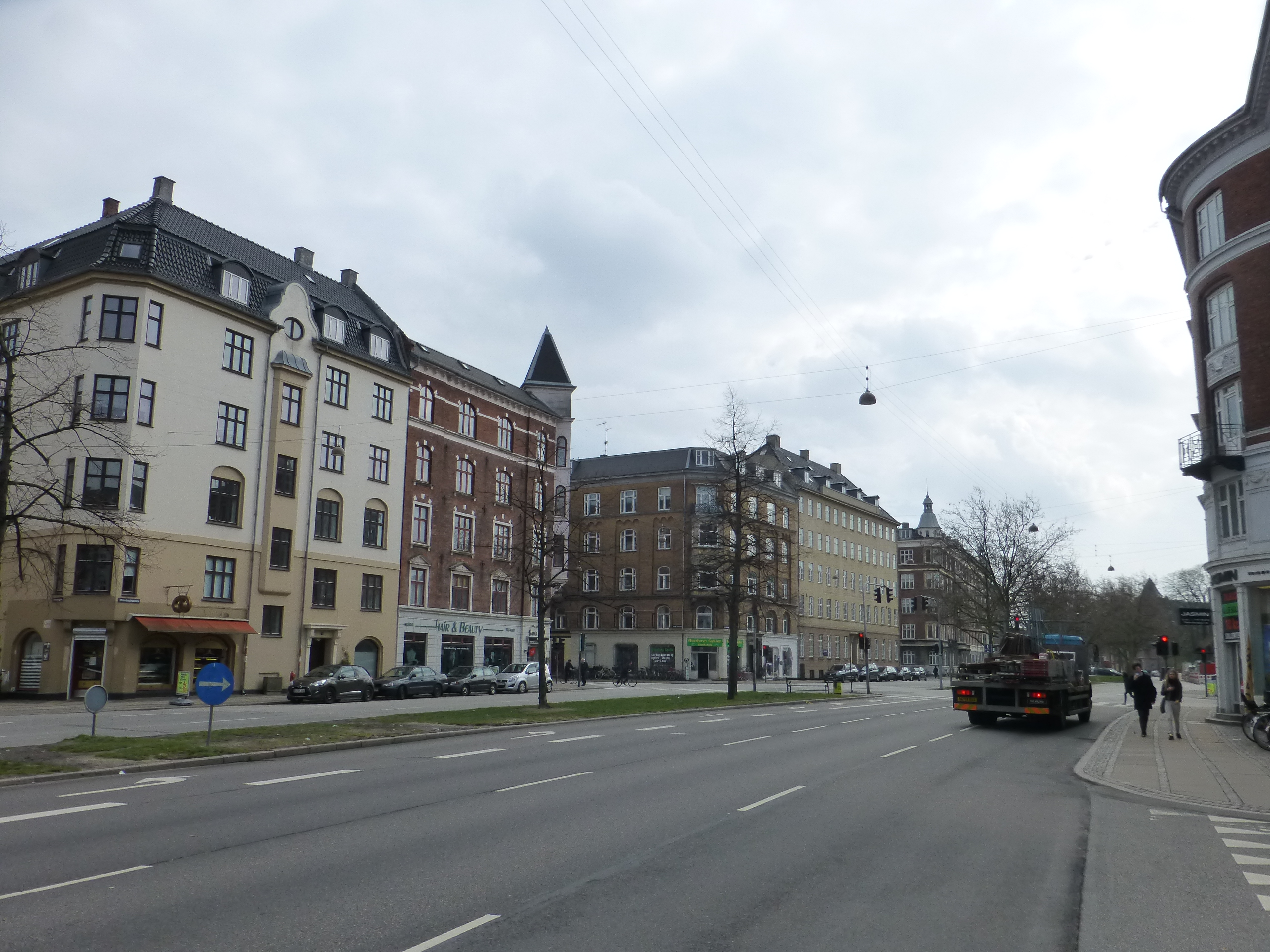
- Interactive map of Strandboulevarden
- Length: 1,930 m (6,330 ft)
- Location: Copenhagen, Denmark
- Quarter: Østerbro
- Postal code: 2100
- Nearest metro station: Østerport station
- Coordinates: 55°42′18.72″N 12°35′12.12″E
- South end: Fridtjof Nansens Plads
- Major junctions: Classensgade, Nordre Frihavnsgade, Århusgade
- North end: Poul Henningsens Plads

Strandboulevarden (lit. 'Beach Boulevard') is a major street in the Østerbro district of Copenhagen, Denmark. It runs from Fridtjof Nansens Plads in the south to Østerbrogade in the north, linking Kristianiagade with Jagtvej.

== History ==
Decided by the City Council in 1894 and opened in 1897, Strandboulevarden was founded in connection with the establishment of the Freeport of Copenhagen in the mid-1890s and the opening of the railway between Hellerup and Østerport which moved the coastline north of Copenhagen several hundred eastwards in the mid-1890s. The first section of the street, south of Nordre Frihavnegade, incorporated an existing street, Gefionsgade, slightly more narrow than the rest of the boulevard, which had been founded a few years earlier. The initial plan was to build a bridge across the railway tracks, which would have allowed the boulevard to continue north along present-day Strandpromenaden, but that part of the project was never carried out. Strandboulevarden was instead connected to Østerbrogade, following an existing street, Sibbernsgade, which had been founded in 1860.

Originally the central reservation contained three rows of London planes flanking a promenade for pedestrians. The central row of trees disappeared when the promenade was replaced by a tram line between 1938 and 1958.

== Notable buildings and residents ==
The historicist main building of Vibenhus School was designed by city architect Ludvig Fenger. Its façade on Strandboulevarden does not fluctuate with the neighbouring buildings since it was completed in 1892 when the alignment of the boulevard had not yet been decided on.

No. 35 was designed by Danish architect Eugen Jørgensen and constructed between 1902 and 1903. The building is notable for its architectural significance including its most characteristic features including the richly articulated roof profile, consisting of an hexagonal corner tower with a balcony with wrought iron grilles, flanked by two pointed gabled dormers with decorative, cantilevered timber-framework and weathervanes. The building has been listed on the Danish registry of protected buildings and places.

No. 49 is the former Finsen Institute. The main building was designed by Gotfred Tvede and opened in 1921. The complex was later expanded by Kay Fisker and C. F. Møller in 1937. Kay Fisker also designed Mødrehjælpen's building at No. 6. It was completed in 1955.

== See also ==
- Århusgade
