= Christian IX's Gade =

Street in Copenhagen

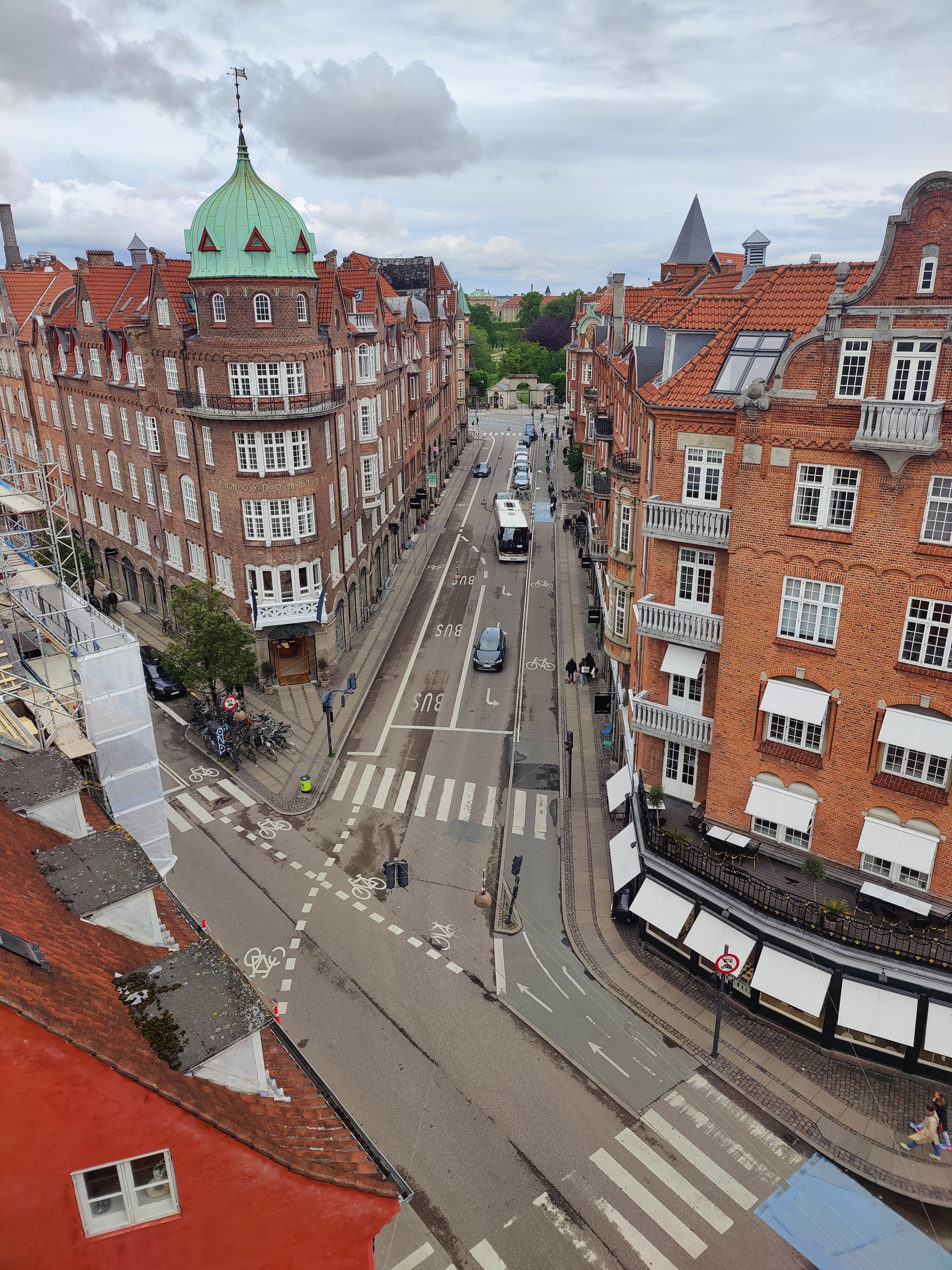
- Christian IX's Gade from Gammel Mønt
- Interactive map of Christian IX's Gade
- Length: 144 m (472 ft)
- Location: Indre By, Copenhagen, Denmark
- Postal code: 1111
- Coordinates: 55°49′55.56″N 12°34′51.24″E

Christian IX's Gade (lit. "Christian IX's Street") is a street in central Copenhagen, Denmark. It runs from Gammel Mønt in the south to Gothersgade in the north.

== History ==
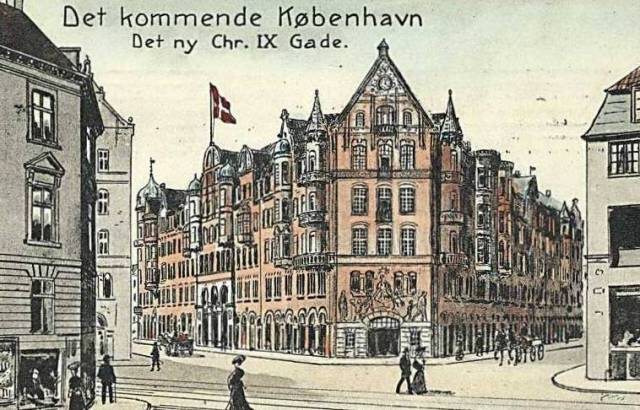
"Copenhagen of the Future":Christian IV's Gade seen on a post card frby Janus Laurentius Ridter

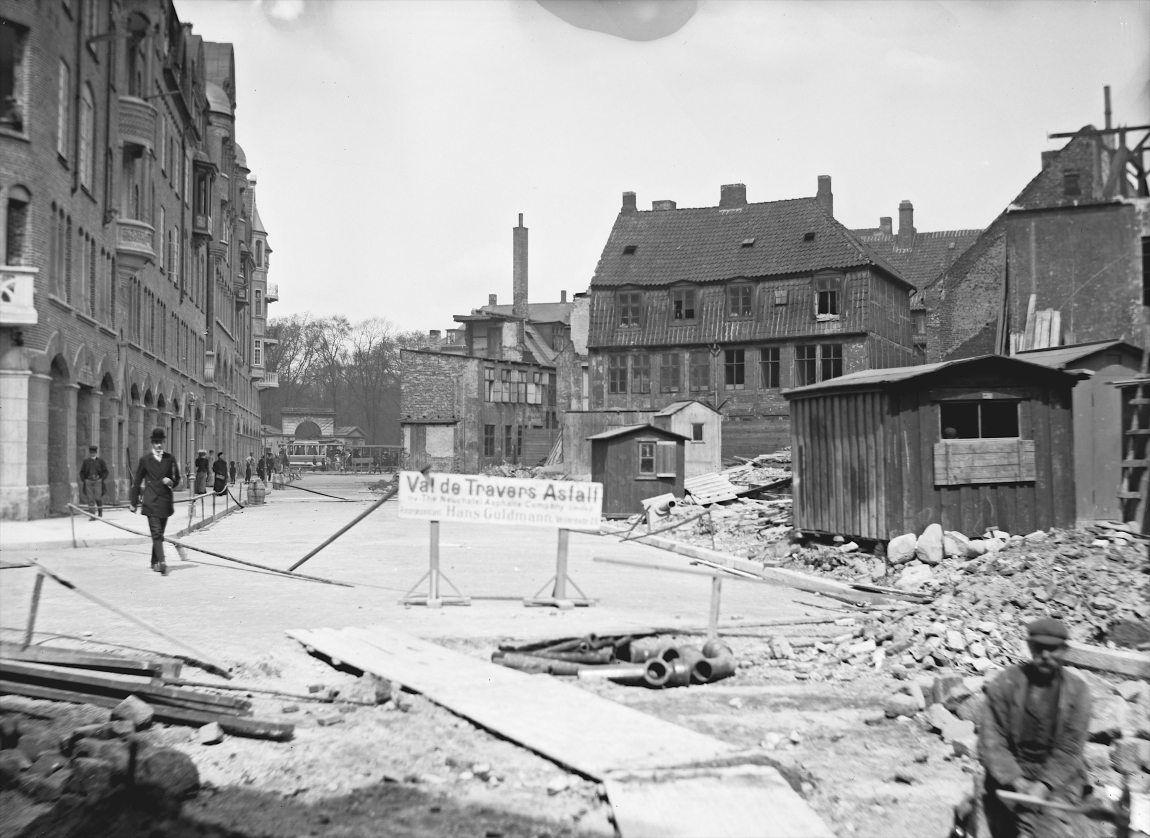
Christian IX's Gade in 1908

Christian IX's Gade was created in 1906 when a private consortium, Christian IXs Gades Byggekonsortium redeveloped the entire block between Møntergade and Store Regnegade. Copenhagen's new neighbourhoods outside the old fortifications were experiencing rapid population growth while the population in the old city was declining. Some of the oldest and most ramshackle housing blocks were therefore being replaced by commercial buildings or modern apartment buildings. The new street ran diagonally through the area. It was named after Christian IX who had just died. Construction progressed fast and had been completed in 1910.

== Buildings ==
Eugen Jørgensen, who was both a partner in the development company and a member of the City Council, designed all the buildings along the street. They are built in a monumental National Romantic style, combining red brick and roof tiles with architectural details such as bay windows, orio windows, exposed timber framing, turrets and spires. The north side of the street forms one side of a triangular block which is completed by Møntergade and Gammel Mønt. The south side of the street is divided in two by Ny Østergade.

No. 6 received an award from the city but the architecture was generally subject to widespread criticism for being bombastic and overloaded.

== Image gallery ==
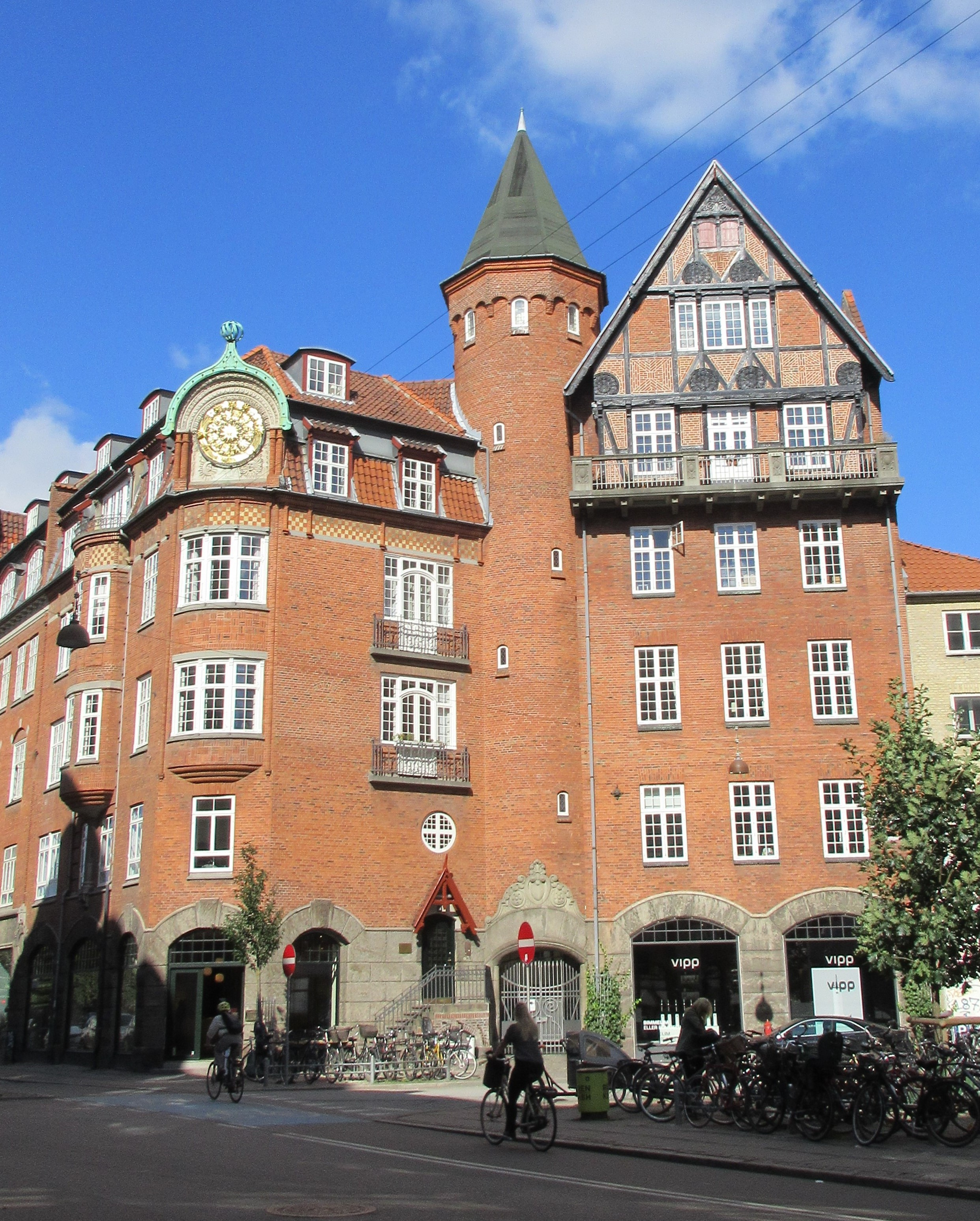
Corner of Christian IX's Fade with Ny Østergade

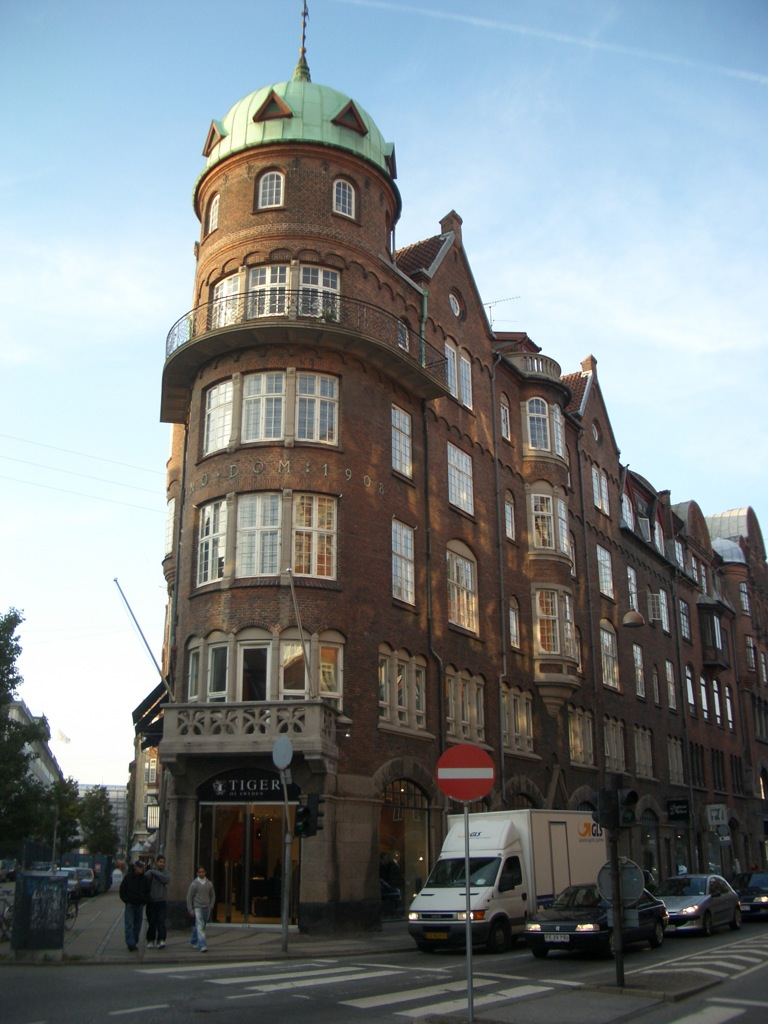
The corner with Gammel Mønt

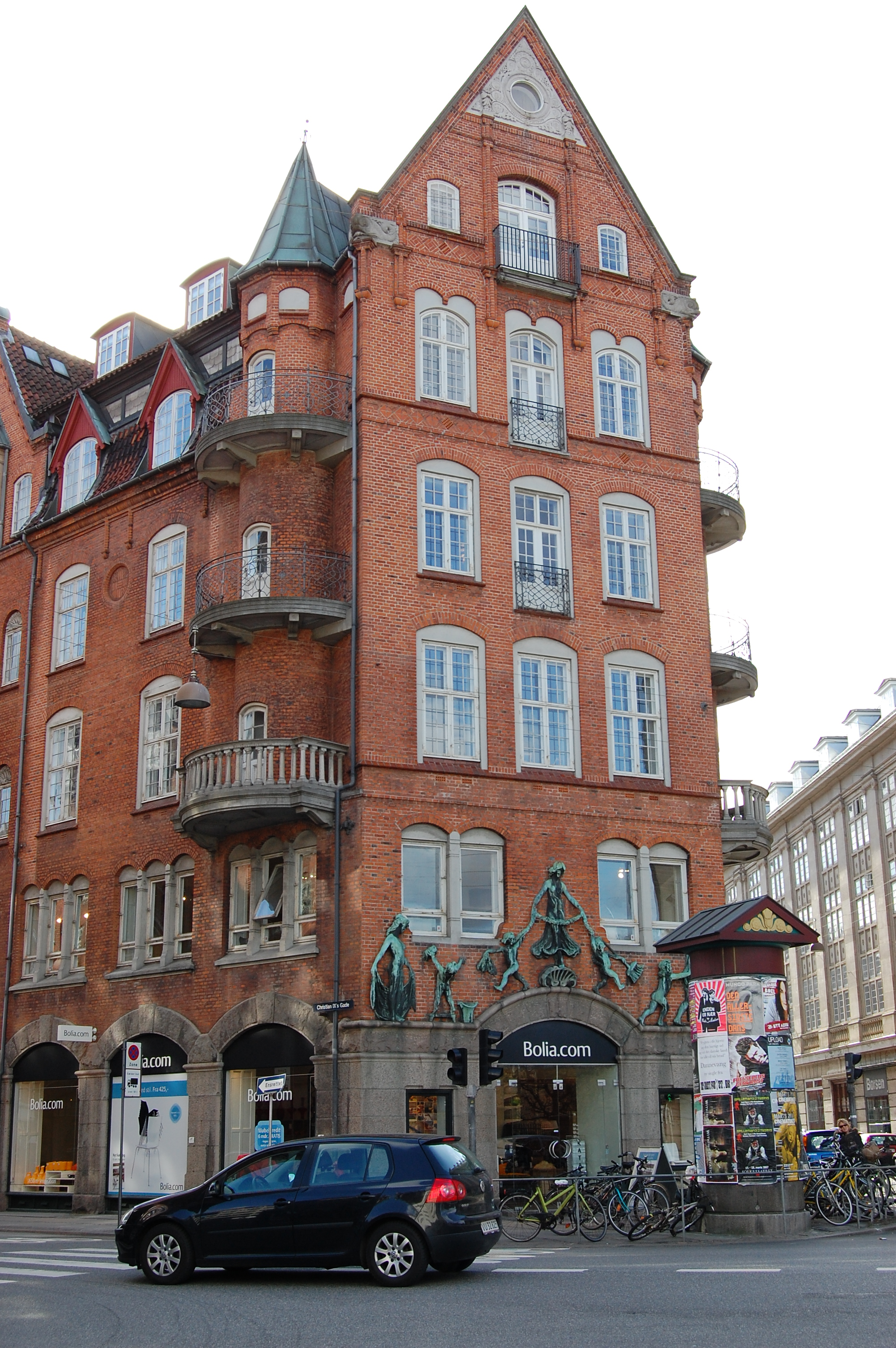
Corner with Møntergade. just off Gothersgade

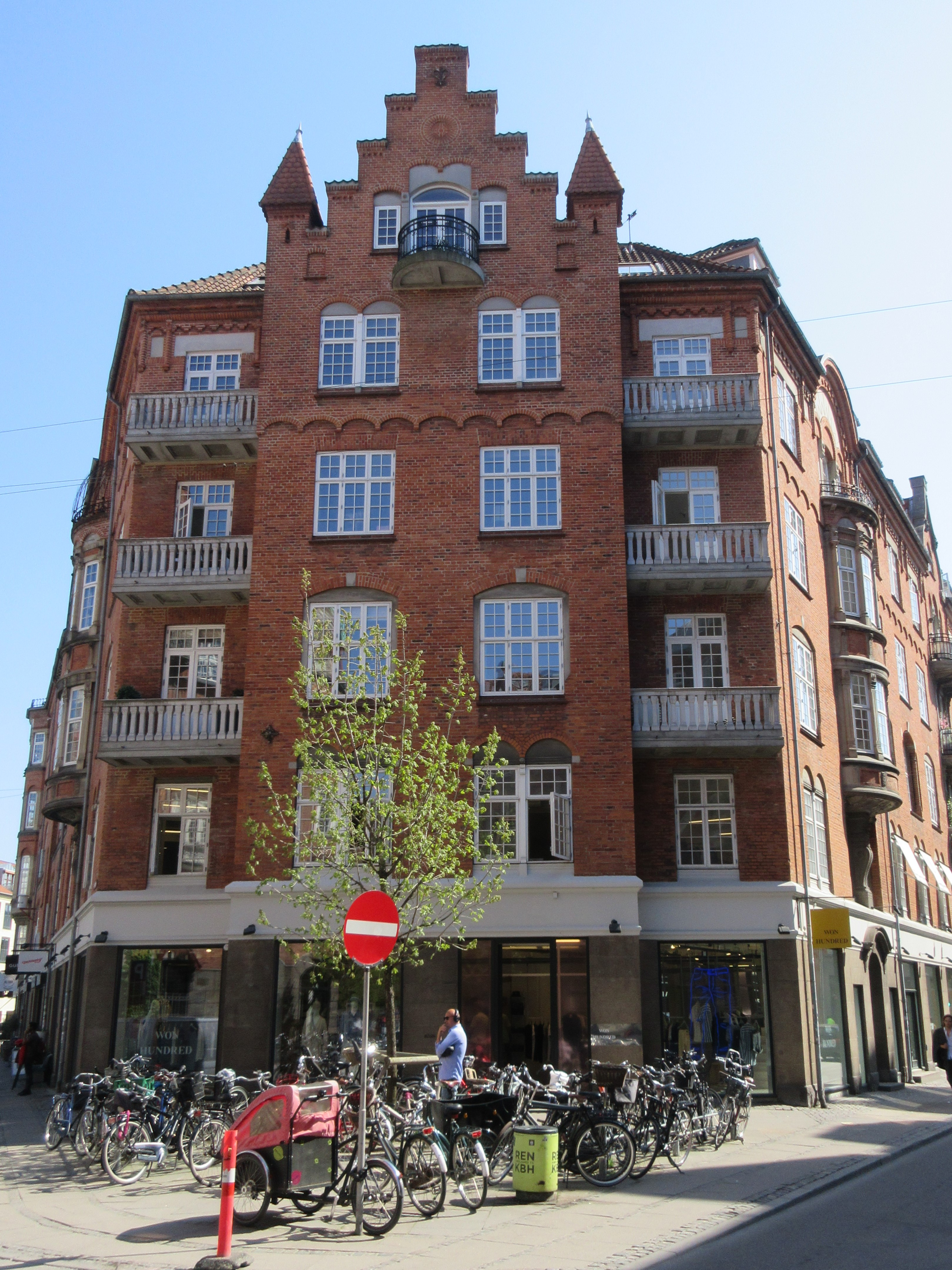
Christian IXs Gade /Ny Østergade corner

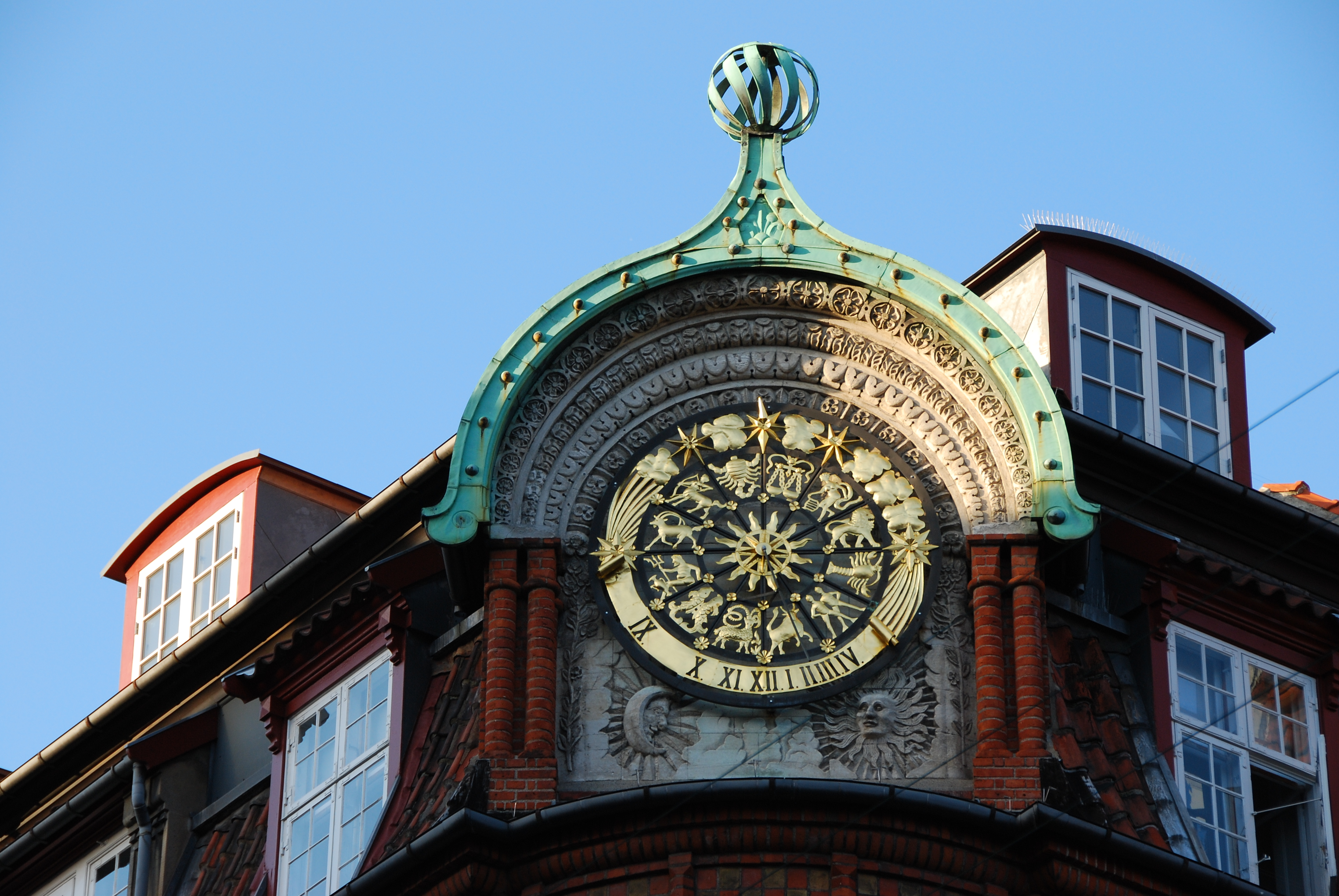
Detail

== See also ==
- Store Strandstræde 19-21
