= Gammel Mønt =

Street in Copenhagen, Denmark

Gammel Nønt
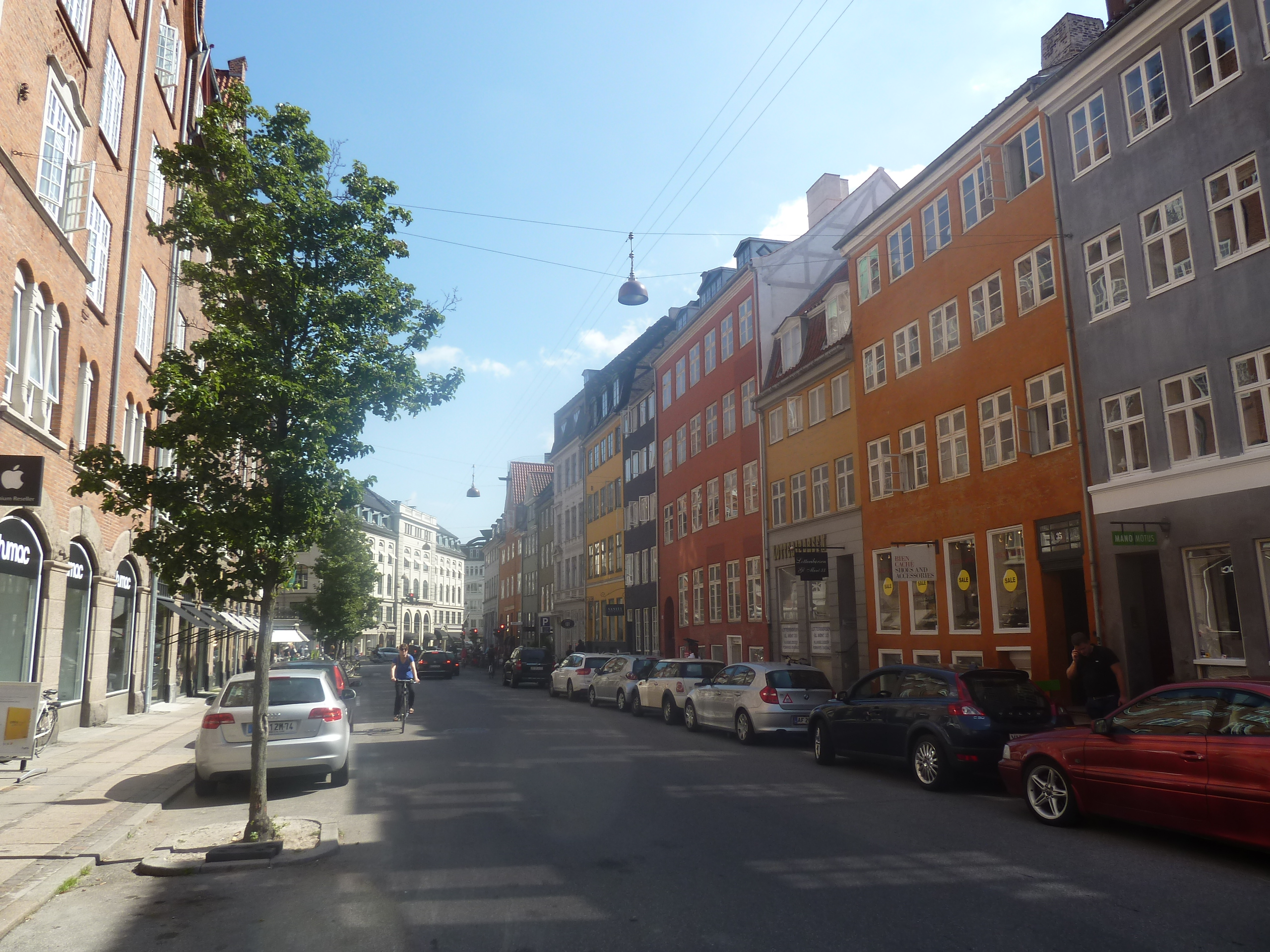
- Gannel Mønt looking north
- Length: 188 m (617 ft)
- Location: Indre By, Copenhagen, Denmark
- Postal code: 1117
- Nearest metro station: Kongens Nytorv
- Coordinates: 55°40′53″N 12°34′50″E

Gammel Mønt (English: Old Mint) is a street in central Copenhagen, Denmark, located one block west of Gothersgade and Rosenborg Castle Garden.

== History ==
In 1497, a community of Poor Clare nuns established the Monastery of St. Clare roughly at the junction of present-day Gammel Mønt and Møntergade. In 1541, after the Reformation, it came into use as the Royal Mint. From 1575 to 1593 it was used as a church by a German congregation but then again as a mint until 1623 when the Royal Mint moved to Borgergade.

The property then became known as Gammel Mønt, Old Mint, and this name was transferred to the street which emerged between 1631 and 1650 as the former monastery gardens were built over.

The street was destroyed in the Copenhagen Fire of 1728.

== Buildings ==
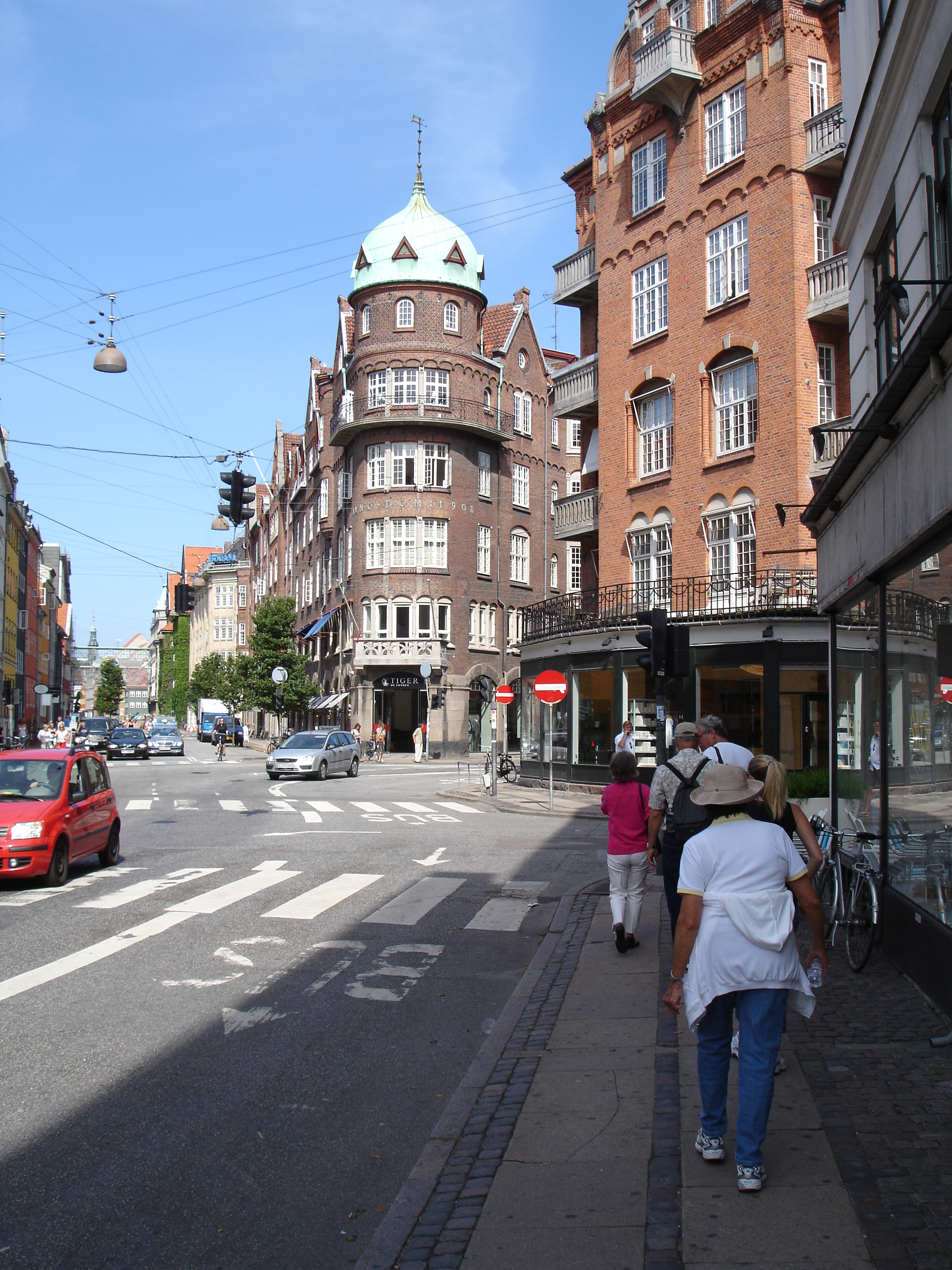
Gammel Mønt seen from the junstion with Christian IXs Gade and Store Regnegade

All except one of the houses on the south side of the street are listed. They are representatives of the so-called fire houses that was built in large numbers in the years after the Great Fire of 1728.

Kvindelig Læseforening's building (No. 1) was built from 1819–1910 to design by Ulrik Plesner and Aage Langeland-Mathiesen.

== See also ==
- Gråbrødretorv
- Landemærket
- Grønnegade
- Klareboderne
- Møntergade
