= Østerfælled Torv =

Square in Copenhagen, Denmark

Coordinates: 55.705155°N 12.576808°E

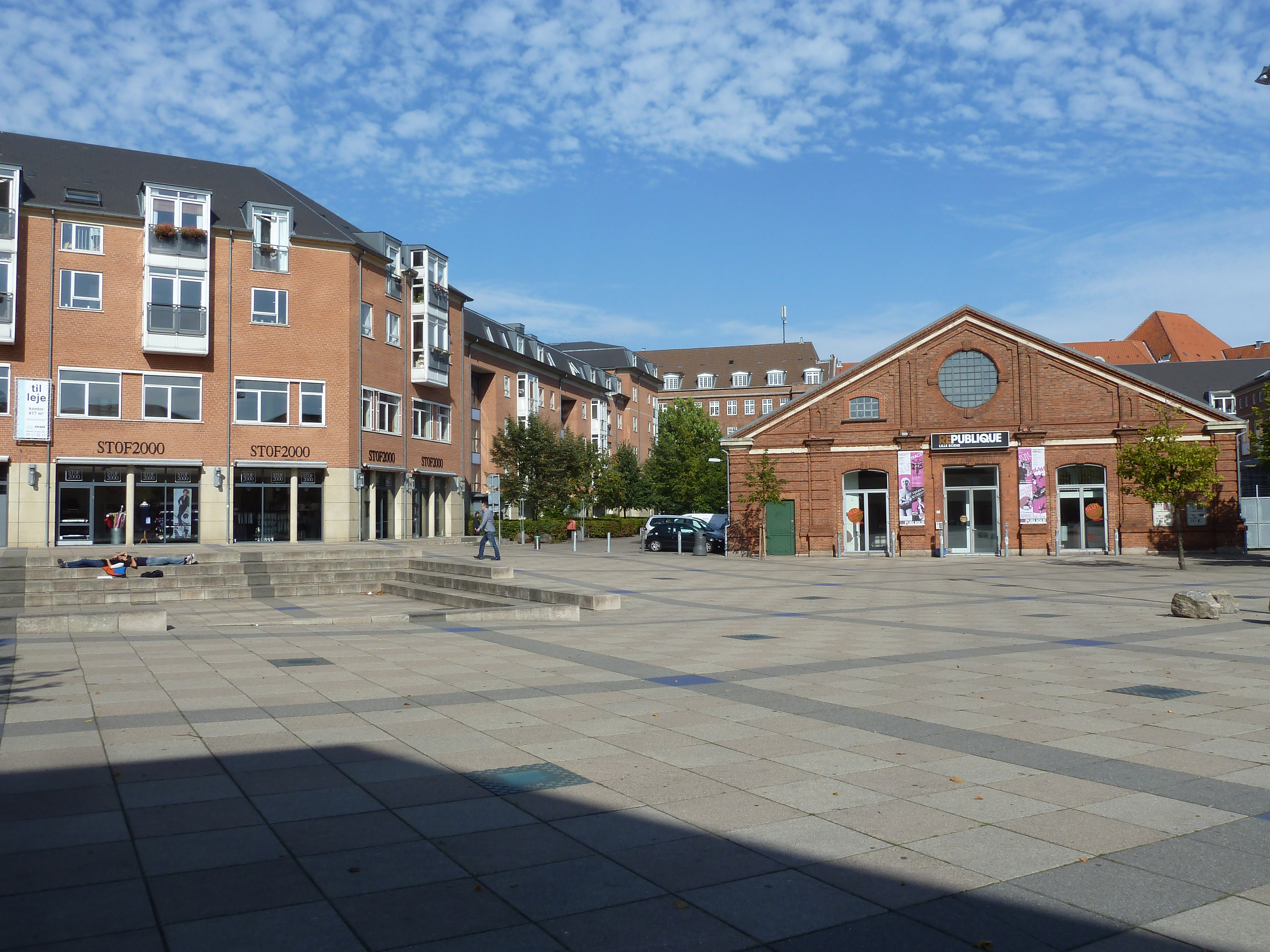
Apartment buildings and the small stage of Theatre Republique at Østerfælled Torv

Østerfælled Torv (lit. "Østerfælled Market") is a mixed-use development surrounding a public space by the same name in the former grounds of Østerfælled Barracks in the Østerbro district of Copenhagen, Denmark. It is a result of a redevelopment of the site in the 1990s which preserved many of the old buildings, now used for retail and commercial space as well as cultural facilities, combining them with new apartment buildings.

== History ==
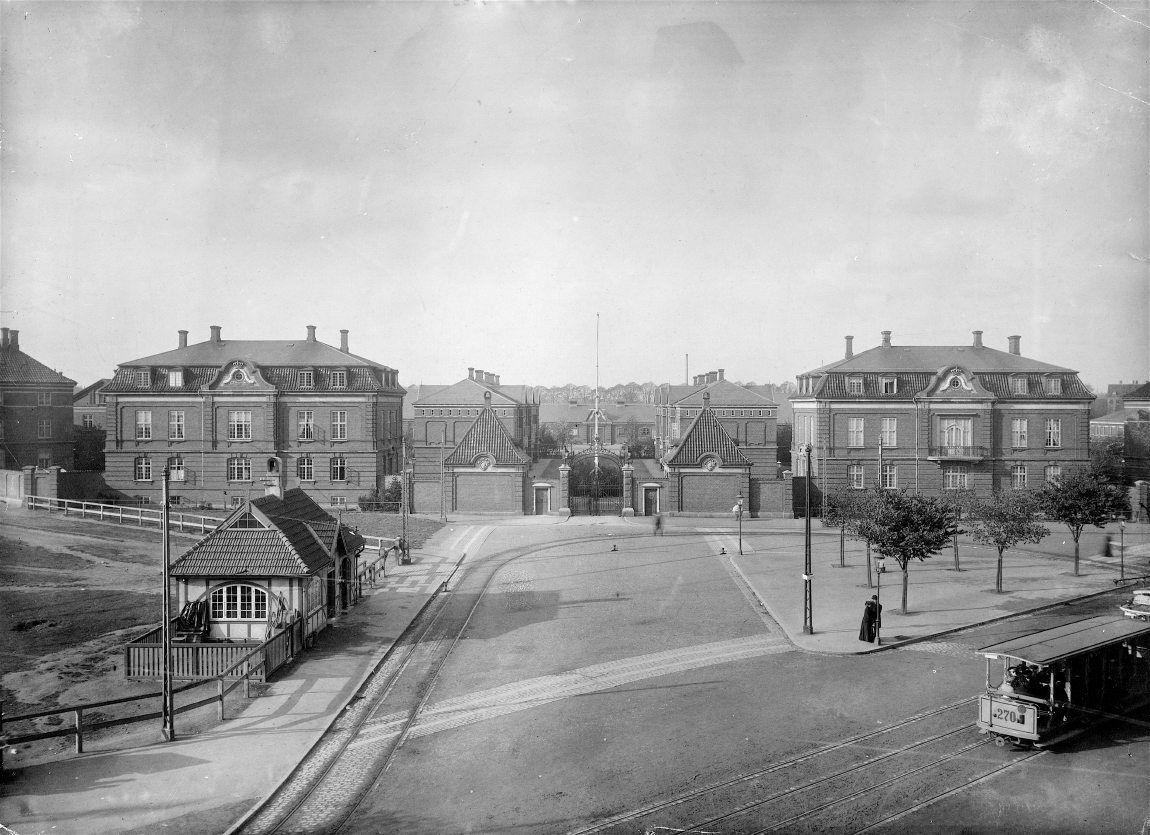
Østerfælled Barracks photographed by Frederik Riise in 1898

Plans for the redevelopment of the former Østerfælled Barracks emerged in the early 1990s after all military activities had left the area. Arkitektgruppen (now Arkitema) designed the project. A local plan for the area was adopted by the politicians in 1992 and the area was subsequently acquired by BUPL's pension fund PBU in 1993. Some of the old buildings were demolished to make way for new residential buildings. Others were converted into retail and commercial space.

PBU sold the residential share of the project to Schaumann Investment for DKK 1,5 billions in 2006, a transaction which later contributed to the bankruptcy of Roskilde Bank in the light of the financial crisis and the decreasing prices on the housing market. In January 2012, the apartments were acquired by the Swedish property company Balder for the price of DKK 1.1 billion.

== Architecture and layout ==
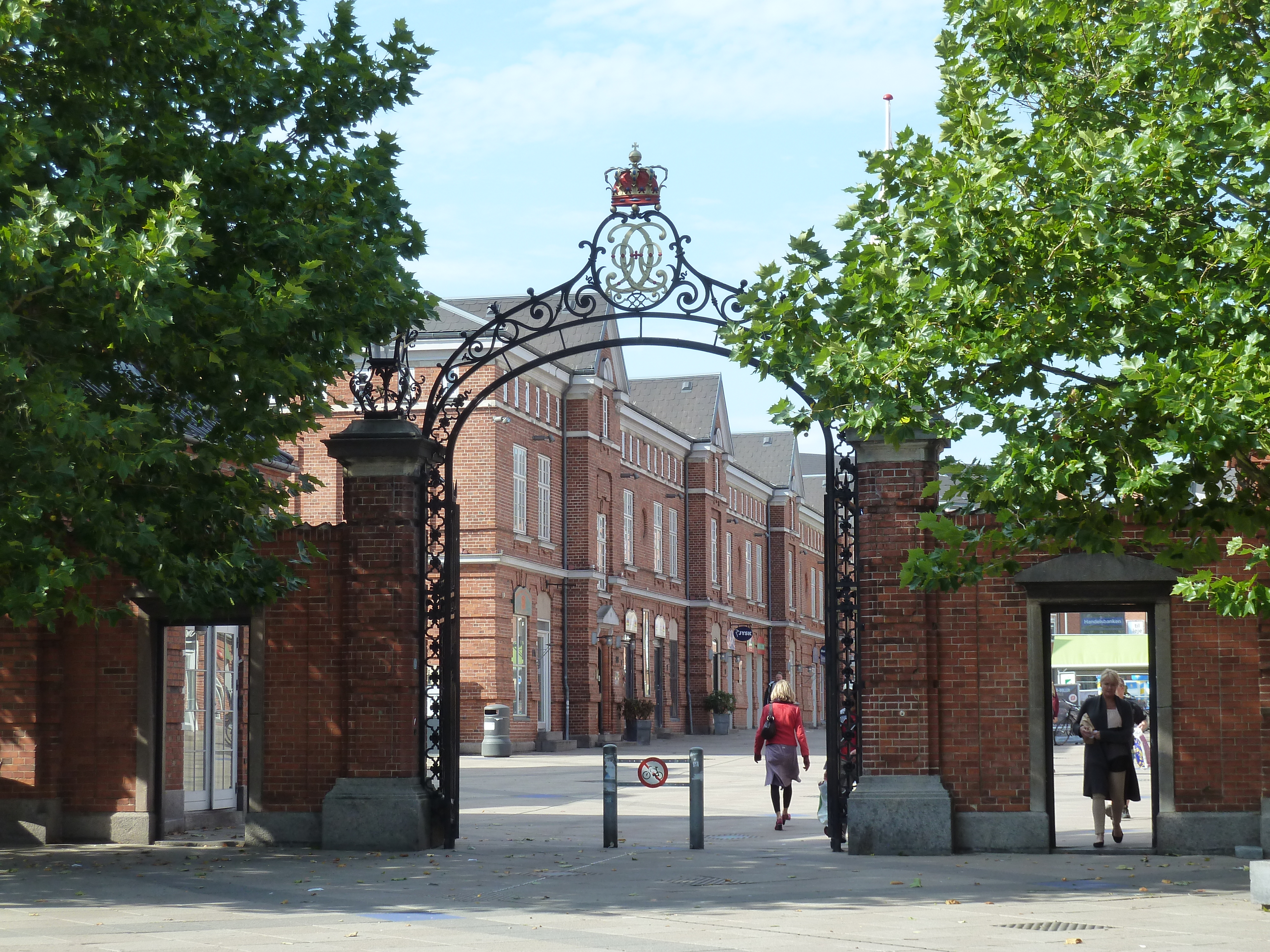
The old gate to the barracks

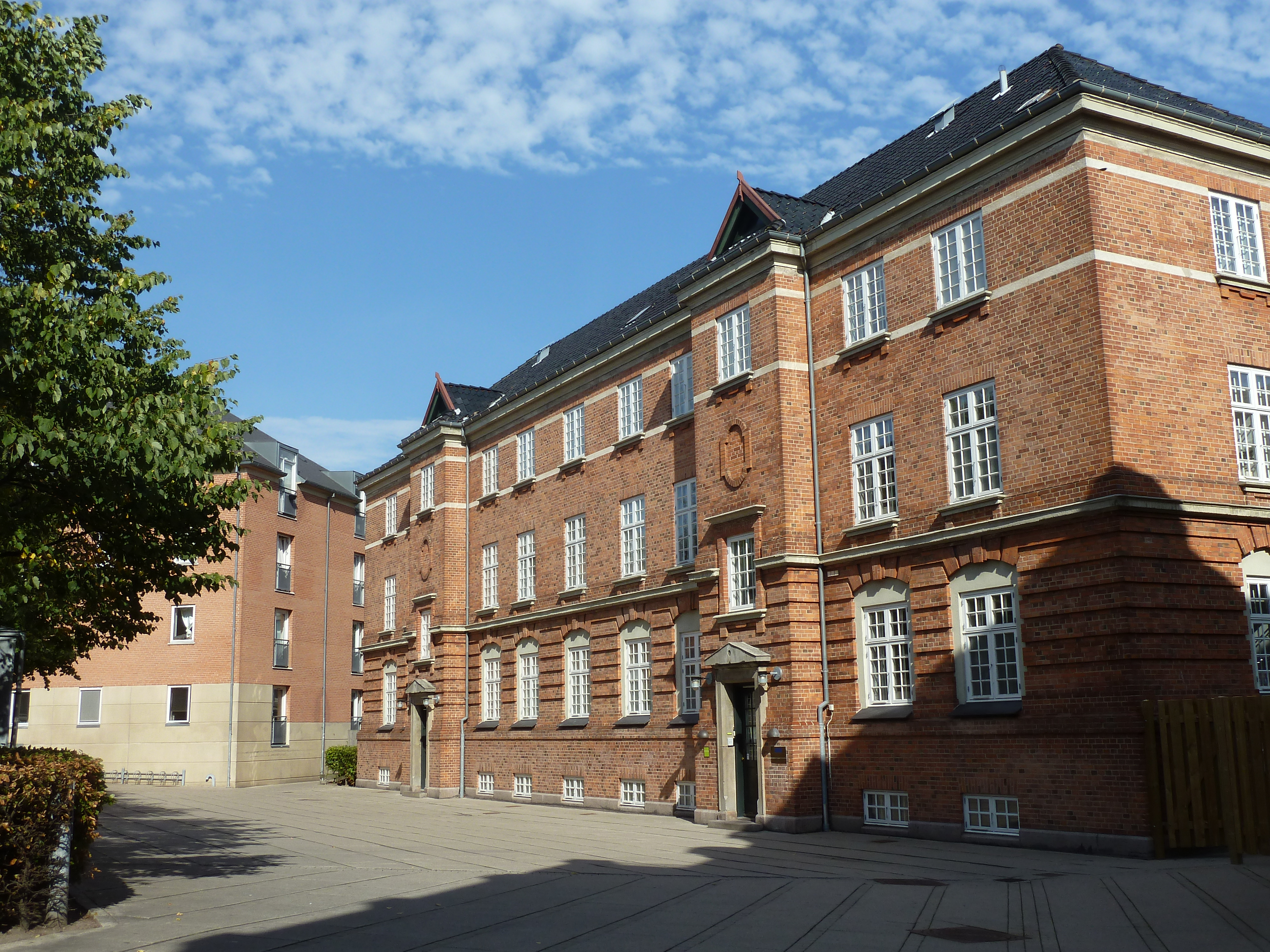
Old and new building

The development is centred on a pedestrianized zone consisting of a large plaza located just inside the old main entrance to the barracks, on the corner of Østerbrogade and Gunner Nu Hansens Plads, and a central axis which extends diagonally into the area. The old buildings along the margin of the area and those surrounding the central space have been preserved. Many of the century-old trees in the area, mainly English yew and lime, were also preserved in connection with the redevelopment.

The new apartment buildings are located to the rear of the old buildings. They are five storeys high and arranged in four large, open blocks with a total of 525 apartments. They respect the symmetry and architecture of the original development. The style is Postmodern. They are built in red brick like the old buildings but in combination with concrete columns and balconies and window sections in steel and aluminium. In total, old and new buildings cover an area of 60,000 sqm. The artist Finn Skødt has created artworks for the public spaces. The theatre Republique is also based in the area.

== Cultural venues ==
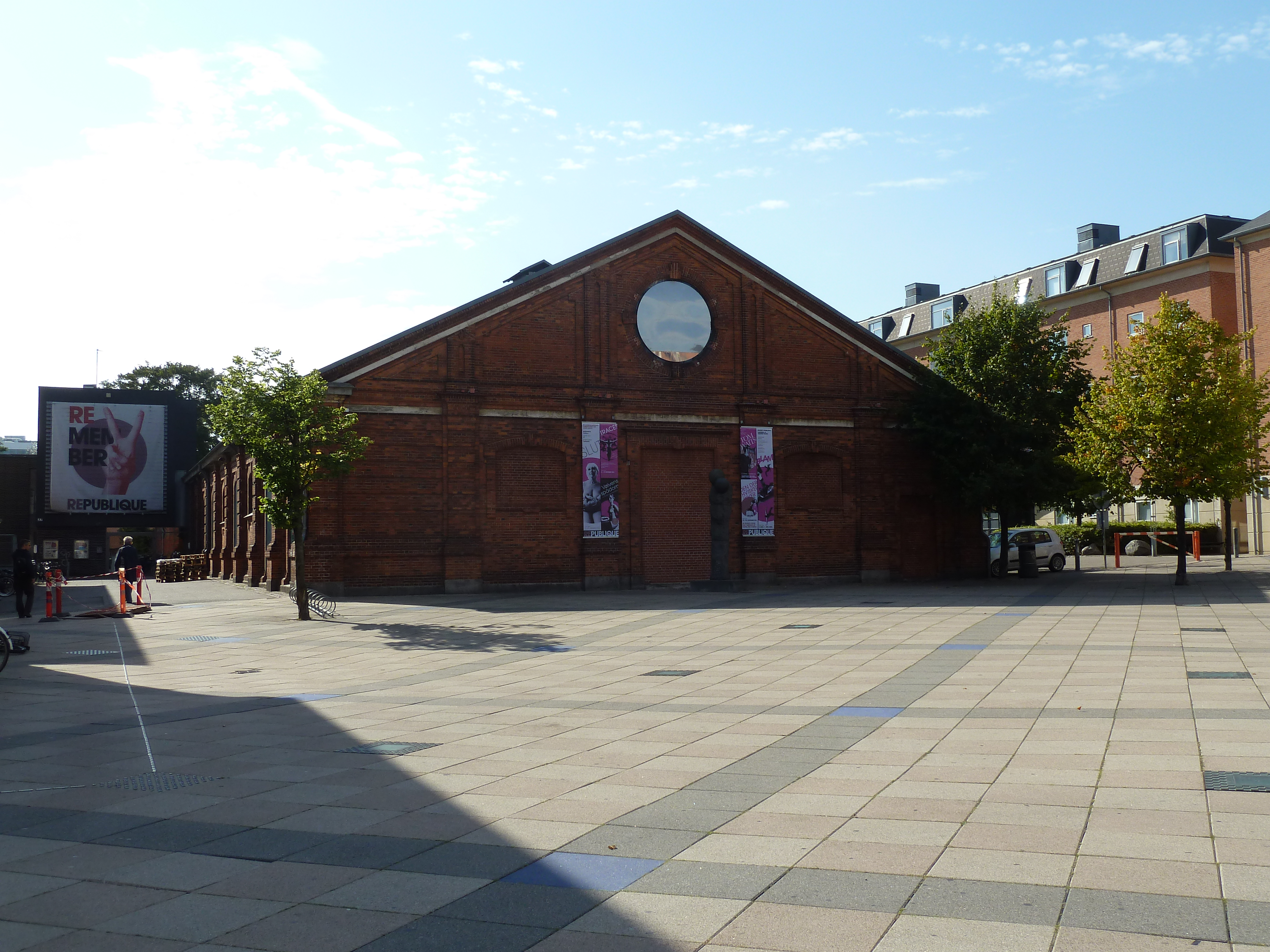
Theatre Republique

Two large buildings located on each their side of the central axis were converted into cultural venues. Kanonhallen (The Canon Hall) was used as a theatre and events venue and was later put at the disposal of the theatre company Kalaidoskop. Dansescenen (The Dance Stage) was a contemporary dance venue. In 2009 both stages were taken over by the theatre Republique, a reinvention of the Frederiksberg-based theatre Camp X, which focuses on international and experimental theatre. Dansescenen moved to Tap E in Carlsberg where it is now part of Dansehallerne. Østerfælled Torv is also home to Krudttønden ("The powder keg"), another cultural venue, which hosts smaller concerts and other shows.

== See also ==
- Spinderiet
