= J. C. Jacobsen Garden =

Park in Copenhagen, Denmark

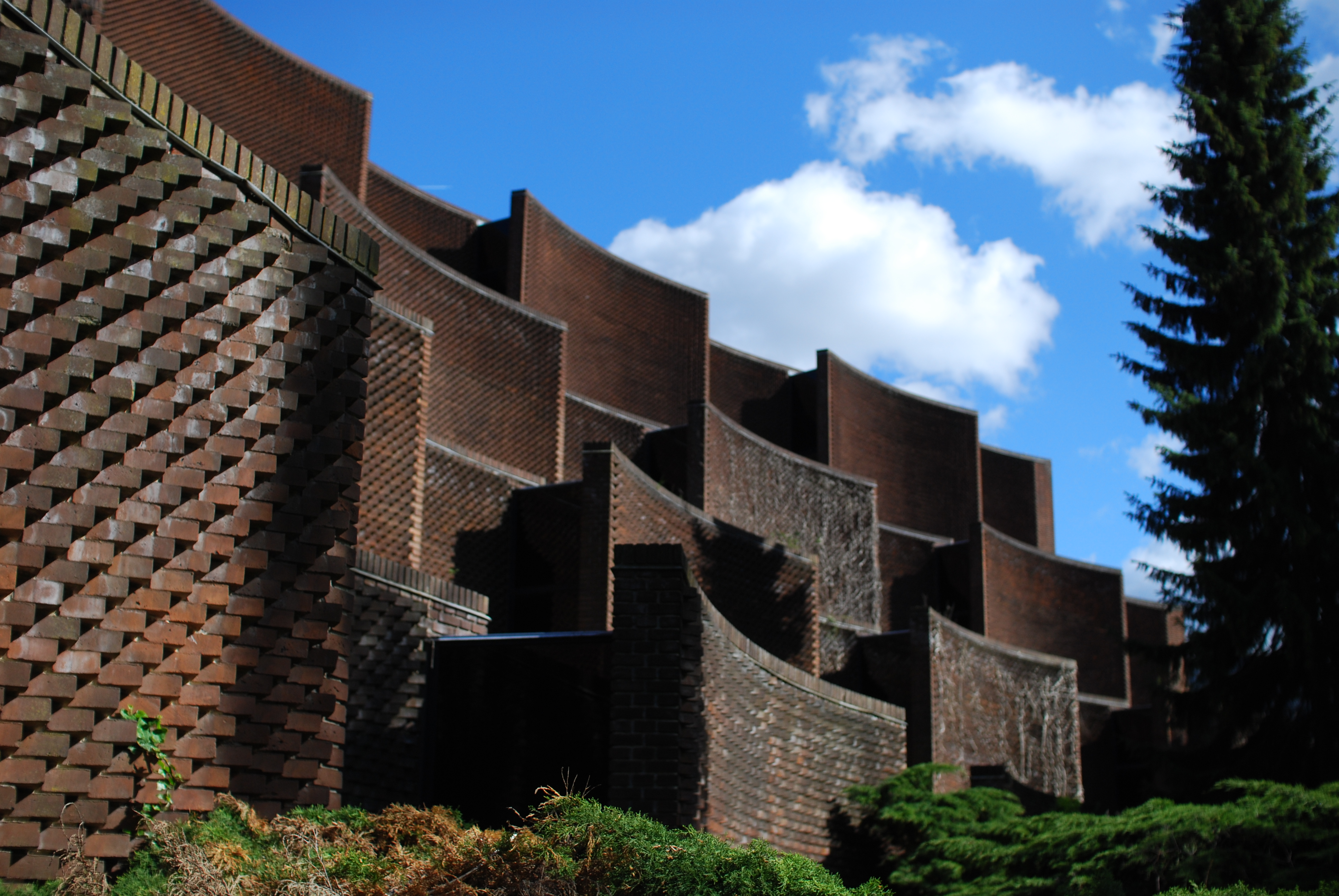
- The Hanging Gardens at the bottom of the garden
- Interactive map of J. C. Jacobsen Garden
- Type: Public garden
- Location: Vesterbro, Copenhagen
- Coordinates: 55.6644°N 12.5333°E
- Area: 1.5 hectares
- Created: 1849
- Owner: Carlsberg Properties
- Open: All year sunrise to sunset

The J. C. Jacobsen Garden (Danish: J. C. Jacobsens Have), also known as the Academy Garden (Danish: Akademihaven), is a public garden in the Carlsberg area of Copenhagen, Denmark. The main entrance is through a pergola on the left-hand side of the Tap E building, a former bottling plant which now serves as a cultural venue.

== History ==
The garden was originally the private garden of J.C. Jacobsen, the founder of Carlsberg Breweries, and laid out in 1849 in connection with his private villa. The garden plan was created by landscape architect Rudolph Rothe (1802-1877), a personal friend of Jacobsen who also took great personal interest in its design. He brought home inspiration as well as rare varieties of trees and other plants from his travels. Soil from the construction of the brewery's extensive system of cellars was utilized to create topographical variation.

When the house later came to host the Carlsberg Academy, the garden became known as the Academy Garden.

== Layout and trees ==
The garden is a romantic landscape garden. It is shielded from the surroundings by trees and hedges and contains winding paths, lawns and a pond. In connection with the opening of the garden to the public, professor Malene Hauxner described the garden as "the best preserved garden of its kind in Denmark" and "a time capsule which has existed for 160 years."

The garden boasts many rare varieties of trees and plants and a number of trees date from its foundation. A survey conducted in 1977 found that the garden contains 77 varieties of plants.

== Hanging Gardens ==
At its bottom, as seen from the J. C. Jacobsen House, the garden is terminated by a structure known as the Hanging Gardens. It consists of a series of terraced roof gardens created by a system of concave walls in ornamental brickwork.

Designed by Svend Eske Kristensen in collaboration with Carlsberg's Project and Planning Departments, it is the result of a 1967-69 expansion of the Ny Tap bottling plant on a strip of land at the bottom of the garden. The design selected seeks to balance the needs of a working industrial site with those of a private garden in terms of securing privacy and mainting an aesthetic backdrop to the garden space as seen from what was then known as the Honorary Residence.

The Hanging Gardens was listed in 2008 and will be incorporated into the design of a residential highrise to be constructed there.
