= Østerfælled Barracks =

Coordinates: 55°42′22″N 12°34′31″E

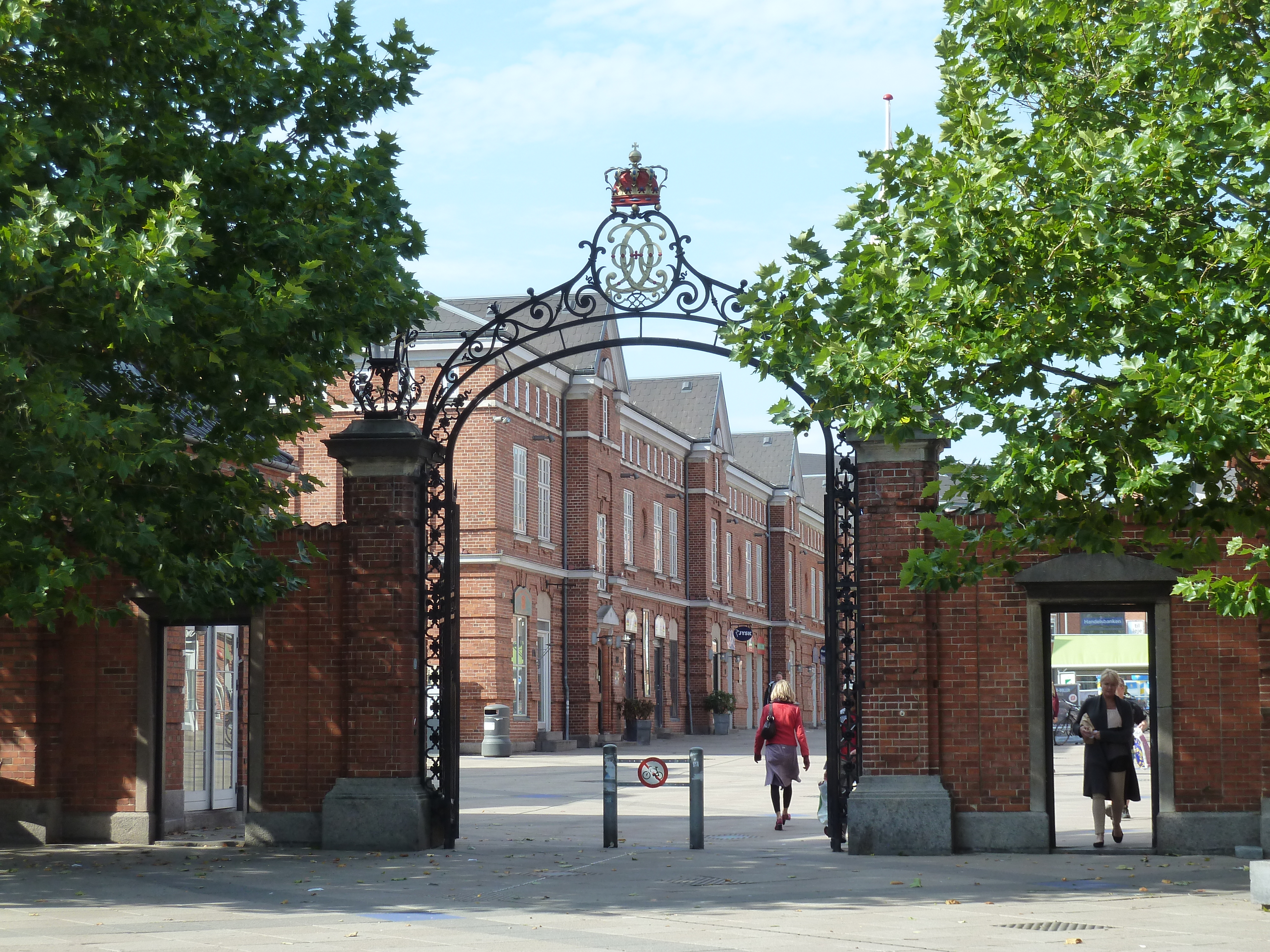
The old main entrance to the area

Østerfælled Barracks (Danish: Østerfælled Kaserne), later known as Østerbrogade Kaserne, was a barracks originally built in the 1890s for the Guard Hussars of the Royal Danish Army in the emerging Østerbro district of Copenhagen, Denmark. Its grounds have now been transformed into a mixed-use development surrounding a pedestrian zone and is now known as Østerfælled Torv. Many of the old buildings have been retained while others have been demolished to make way for new residential buildings. The old main entrance to the barracks is located on the corner of Østerbrogade and Gunner Nu Hansens Plads.

== History ==
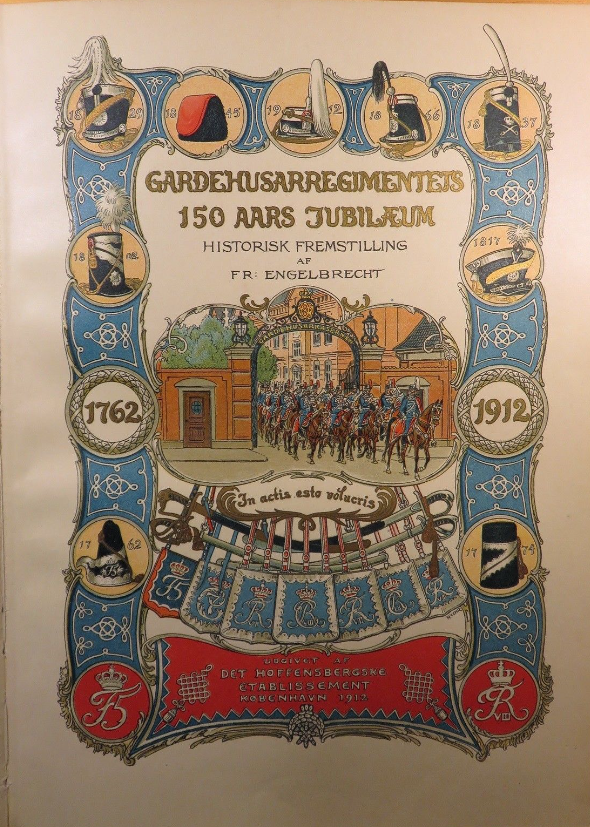
The gate of Østerfælled Barracks seen on a poster

Østerfælled Barracks were designed by Eugen Jørgensen and built between 1897 and 1898 for the Guard Hussars, the light cavalry regiment of the Royal Danish Army. The facility was named after the site, the Eastern Commons (Øster Fælled), which had come under urban development after the decommissioning of Copenhagen's fortifications. St. James' Church, the first church to be built in Østerbro, had been completed next to Østerbrogade a little closer to the city in 1878 but other than that the area was still sparsely developed. The name of the facility was changed to Østerbrogade Barracks after the cavalry moved to Næstved in 1940.

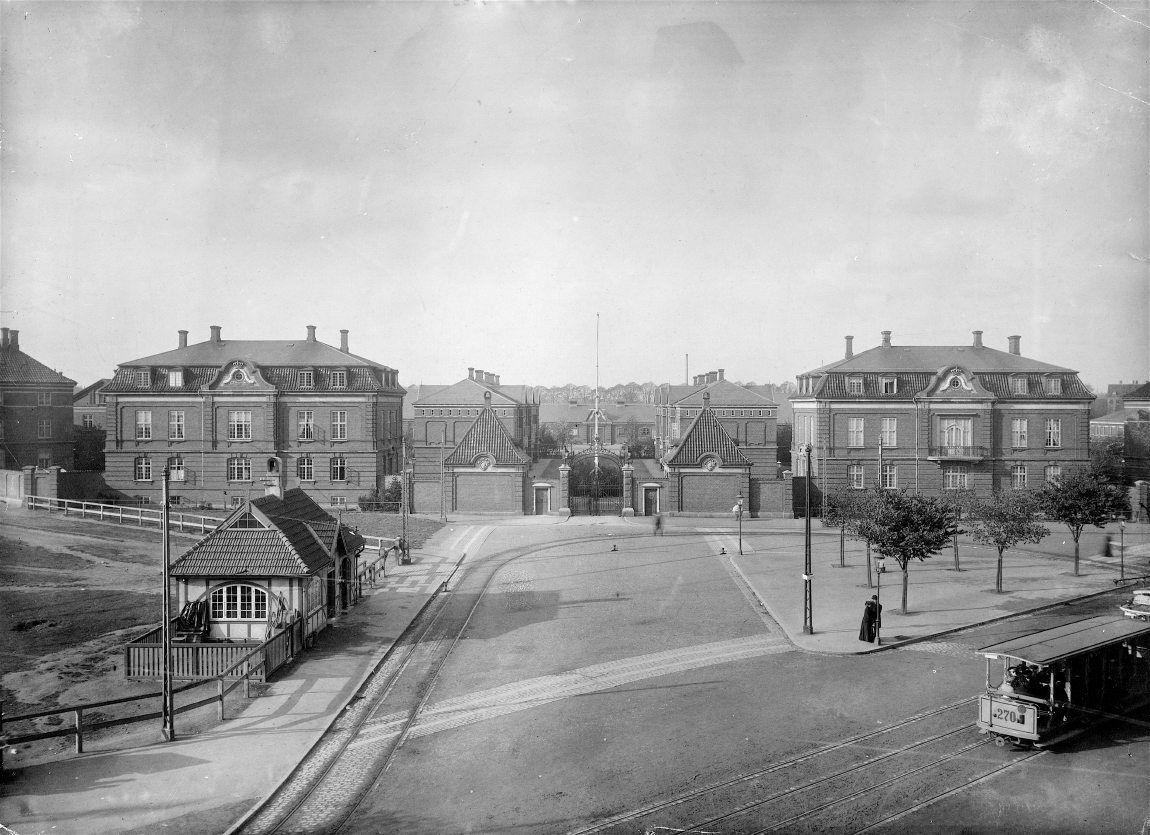
Østerfælled Barracks photographed by Frederik Riise in 1898

After the end of the Second World War, the Air Force Regiment and 10th Artillery Department, until then based at Artillerivej Barracks, took over the premises in November 1945. Later the Danish Defence Academy was based at the site.

A local plan for redevelopment of the grounds was drafted in 1992 and the area was subsequently acquired by the pension fund Pædagogernes Pensionskasse (PBU) in 1993. Some of the old buildings were demolished to make way for new residential buildings. Others were converted into retail and commercial space.

== Architecture ==
The symmetrical complex was laid out around a central axis extending diagonally into the main entrance on the corner of Østerbrogade and present day Gunner Nu Hansens Plads. The gate is topped by King Frederik VII's monogram and flanked by two guardhouses with hipped roofs. The buildings are designed in a Neo-Baroque style and built in red brick with white window frames and Mansard Roofs with blue-glazed tiles.

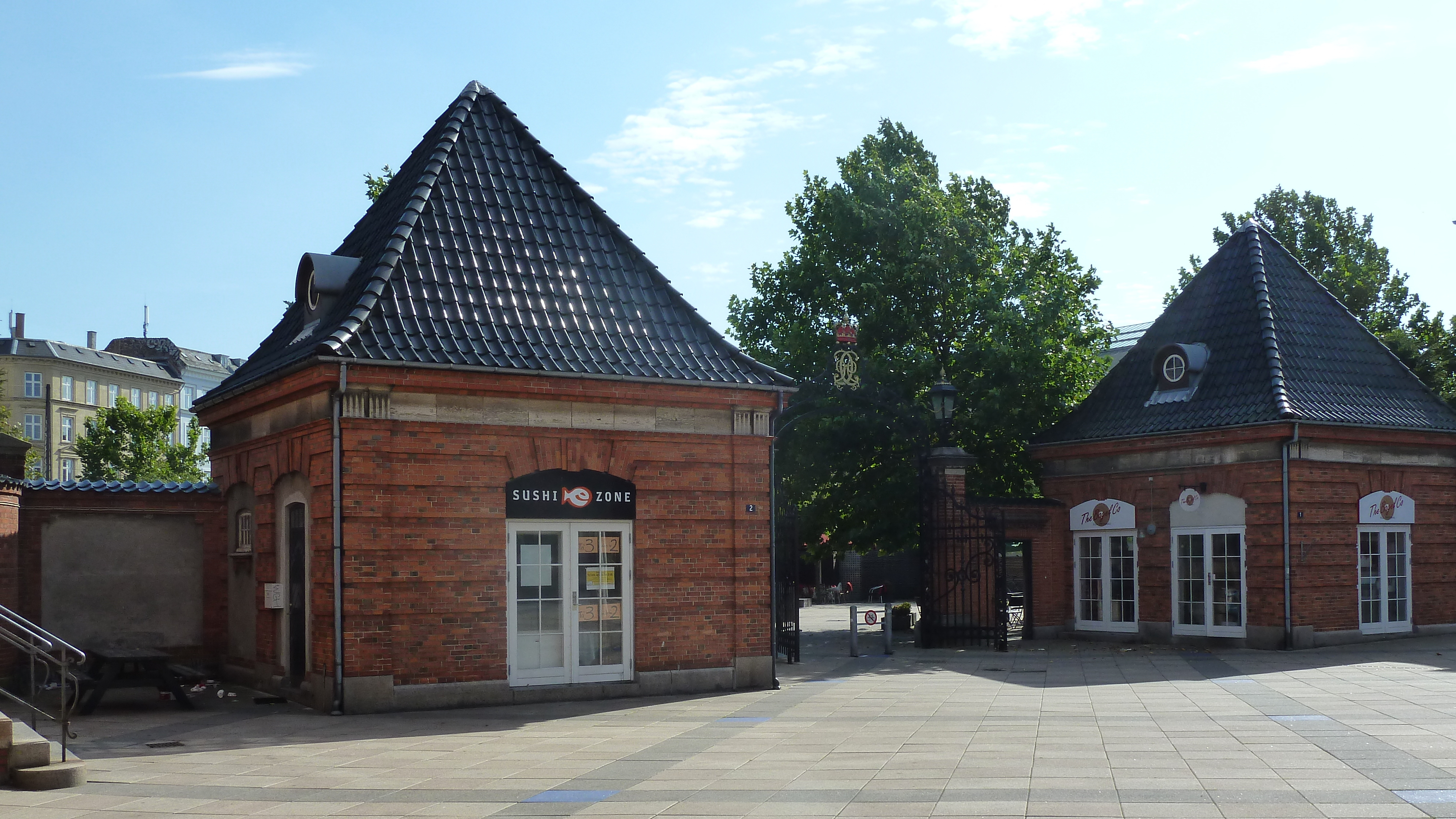
The two guardhouses flanking the main entrance

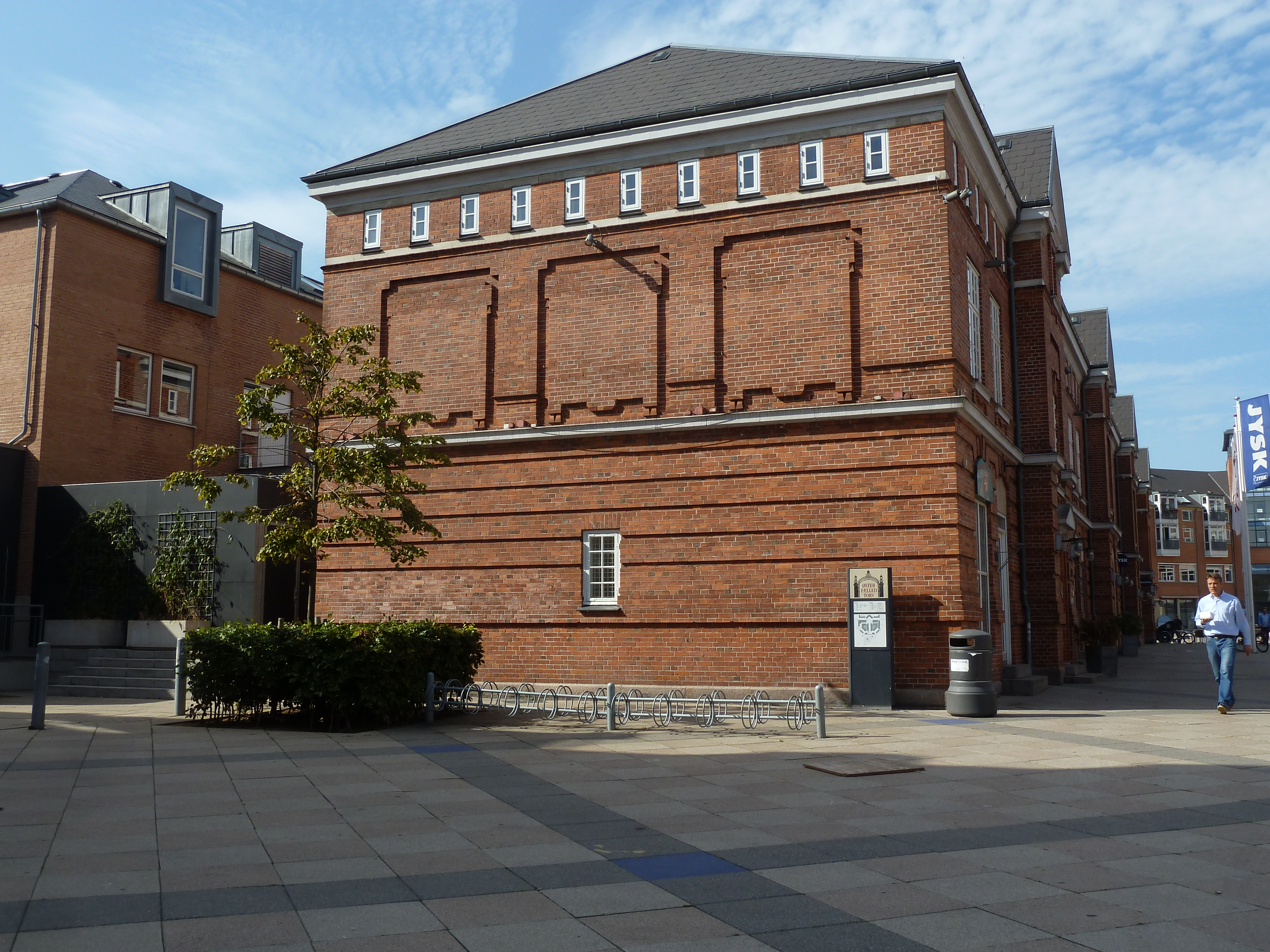

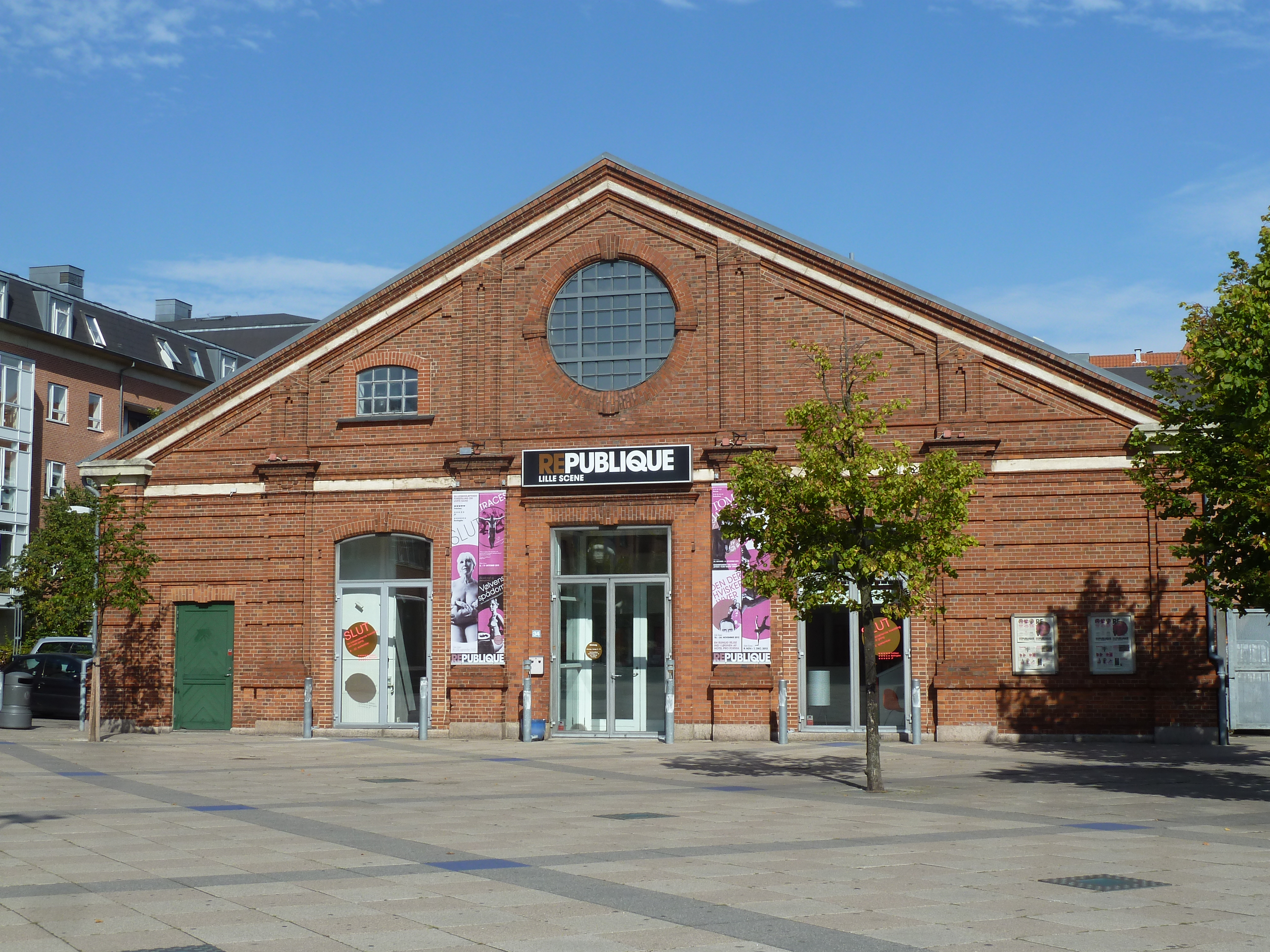
The building now housing Republique's small stage

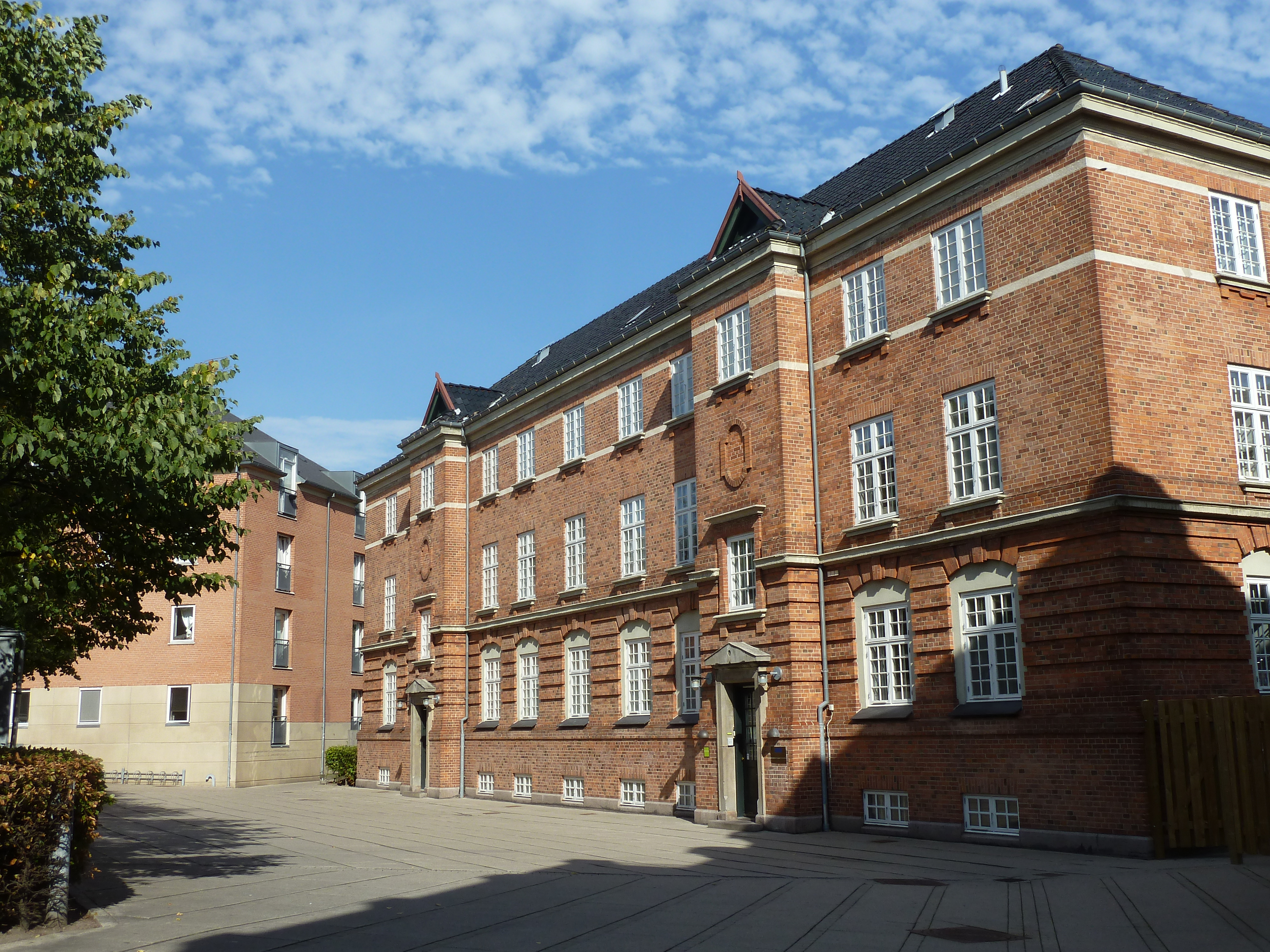
Building

== See also ==
- Royal Horse Guards Barracks (Copenhagen)
