= Tap E =

Brewery in Copenhagen, Denmark

Coordinates: 55.6654°N 12.5345°E

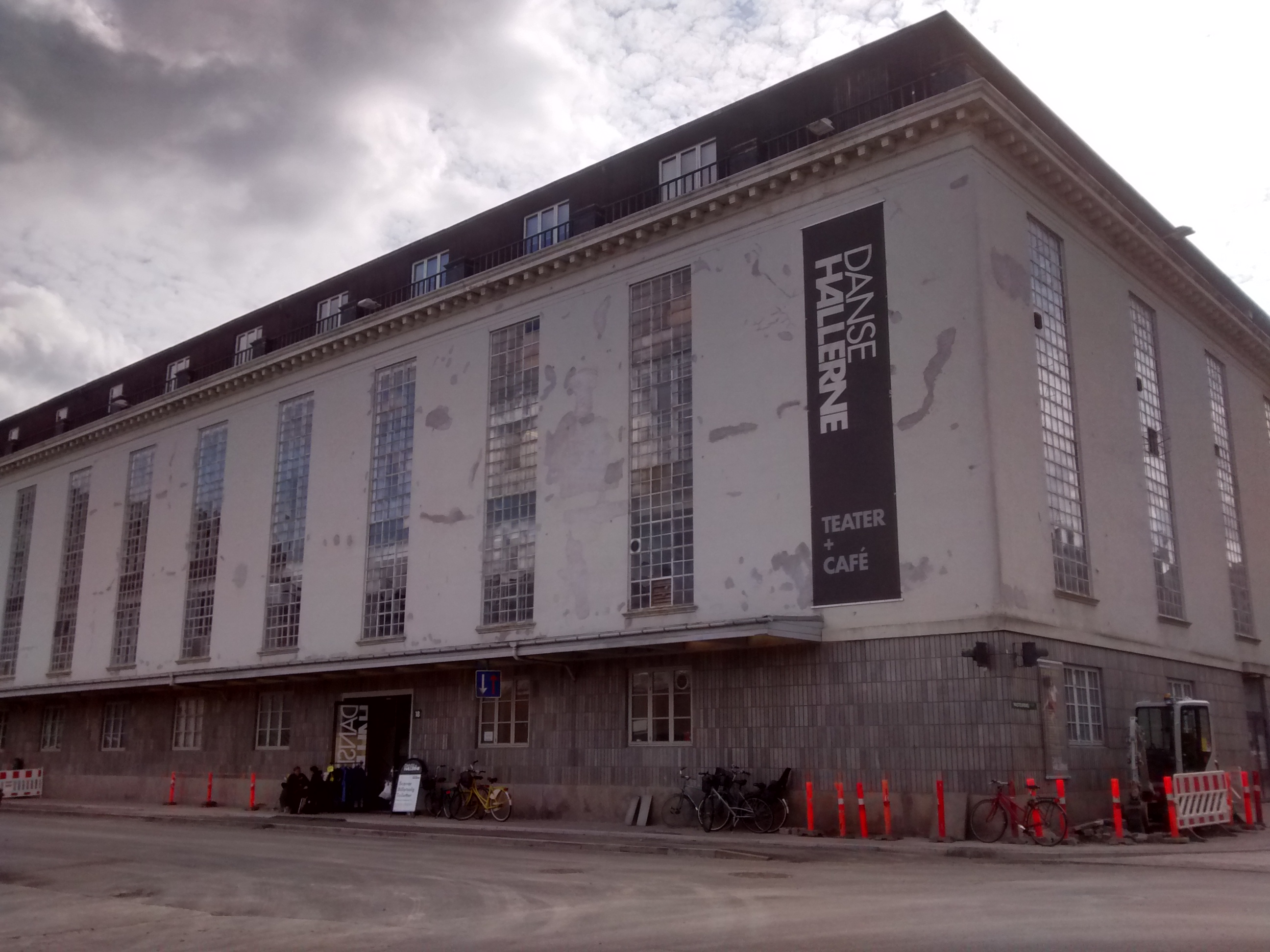
Tap E

Tap E is a former storage building of a bottling plant in the Vesterbro district of Copenhagen, Denmark, part of Carlsberg's historic brewery site which is now known simply as the Carlsberg area. After the production of beer in the area stopped in 2009, the listed building has been taken unto use as a cultural venue which houses both a centre for modern dance, Dansehallerne, and Fotografisk Center, a gallery and digital laboratory dedicated to fine art photography.

The building borders on the J. C. Jacobsen Garden accessed through a pergola running along the left-hand side of the building.

== History ==
Part of the historic Carlsberg Brewery site in Valby, Tap E was originally built as a mineral water factory in 1922 to the design of the architect Carl Harild who also designed a number of other buildings in the area for Carlsberg around that time. The plant soon became too small and in 1927 was expanded with three additional floors. In 1962 the architect Sven Eske Kristensen designed another extension which made it the largest production facility for mineral water in the Nordic countries.

In the 1980s the production of mineral water moved to the Tuborg site in Hellerup. The building was instead used for a production line of export beer, giving rise to its current name (E for Export). In the 1990s the production of export beer stopped and was replaced by the production of canned beer in connection with the re-introduction of beer cans in the Danish market.

In late 2008, Carlsberg terminated the production of beer at the Valby site, concentrating their production of beer in Denmark at their brewery site in Fredericia, and it was decided to redevelop the grounds in Valby into a new urban neighbourhood.

The Dansehallerne centre of modern dance opened in the building on 16 August 2009 Later it has been joined by Fotografisk Center, a centre for fine art photography previously located in the ground floor of Kunstforeningens building at Gammel Strand, which moved into larger premises in the building on 1 February 2011.

== Architecture ==
The building represents the transition from Neoclassicism to Functionalism. Structurally it consists of bearing granite pillars with timber fillings. The recessed upper section is surrounded by a roof balcony.

Tap E was listed in 2009 along with a number of other buildings in the Carlsberg area which is also designated as an industrial heritage site.
