= Møntergade =

Street in Copenhagen Municipality, Denmark

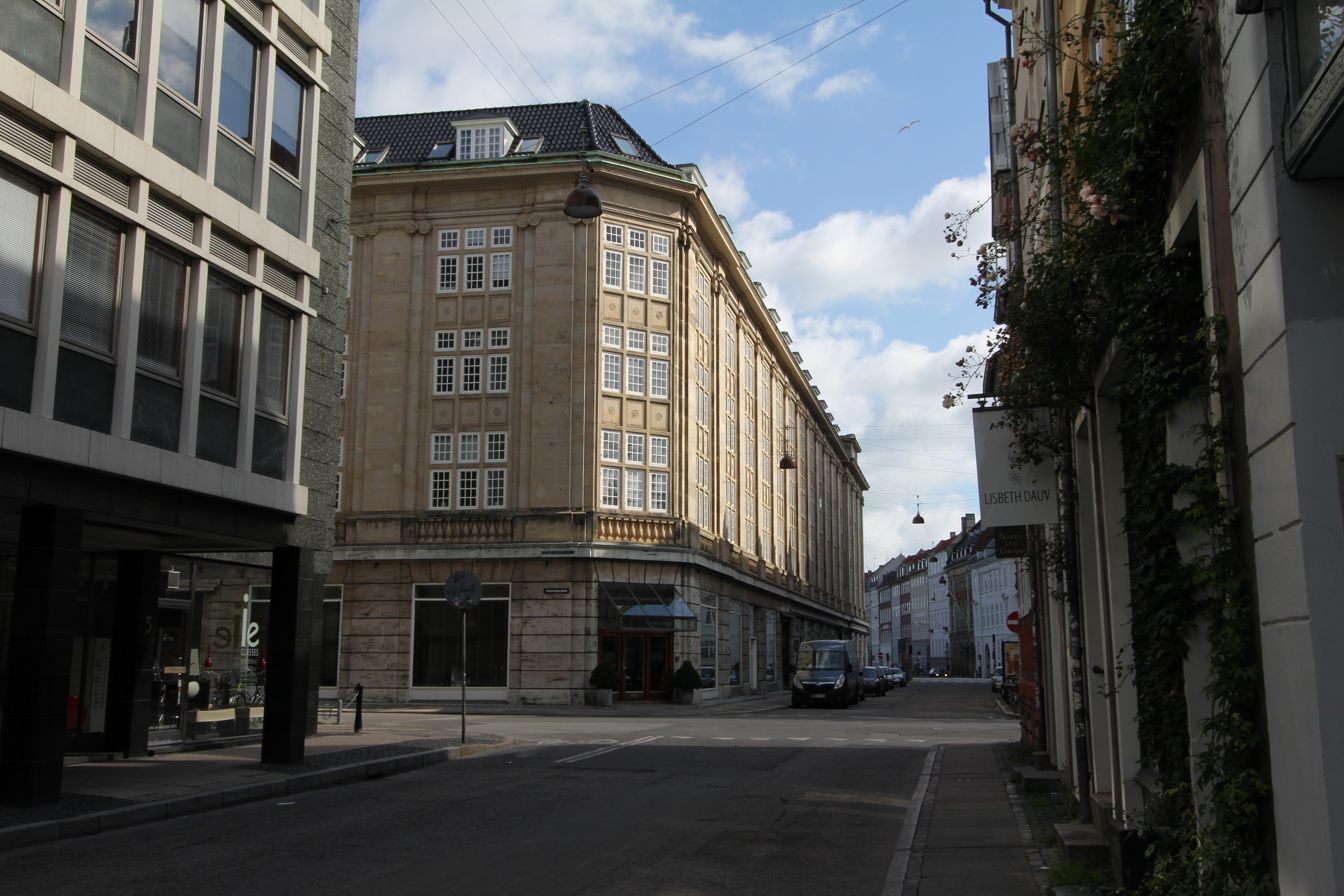
- Møntergade with the Møntergården office building in the middle of the picture
- Interactive map of Møntergade
- Length: 285 m (935 ft)
- Location: Indre By, Copenhagen, Denmark
- Postal code: 1116
- Nearest metro station: Nørreport
- Coordinates: 55°40′56″N 12°34′48″E

Møntergade (lit. "Minter Street") is a street in the Old Town of Copenhagen, Denmark. It runs from Pilestræde in the west to Gothersgade in the east.

== History ==
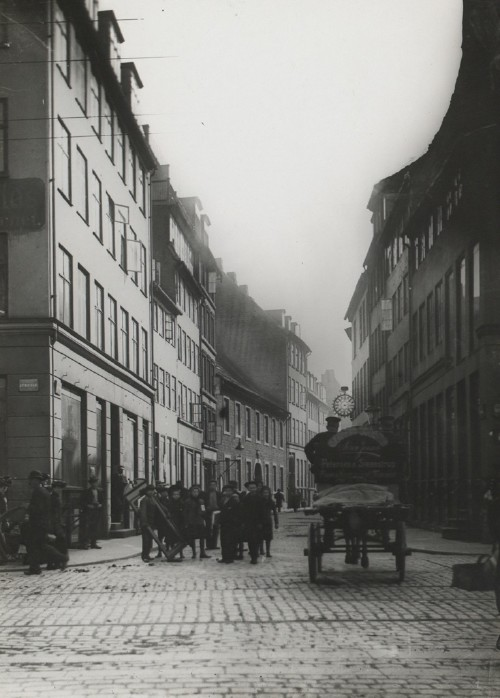
Møntergade in c. 1900: The eastern house row (right) was demolished in 1907 and the western (left) in 1908

Møntergade has probably existed since the Middle Ages but the first reference to the street is from 1528 when it is referred to as "the city's street which runs to the rampart ("byes stræde, som løuer till wollen"), a reference to the city's East Rampart which then followed the course of present-day Gothersgade. The current name of the street is first recorded in 1623. It refers to the Royal Mint which took over St. Clare's Monastery after it was confiscated by the crown during the Reformation. In 15659, most of the residents in the street were craftsmen such as carpenters, weaversn coopers, wood carvers, wheelwrights, glove makers and basket makers.

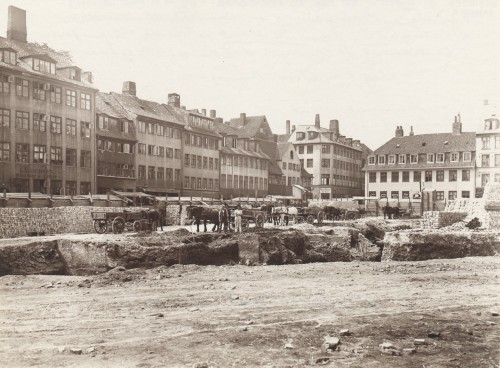
Area cleared in connection with urban renewal in the 1900s, watching from Store Regnegade in the direction of Møntergade

Poul Fechtel, who had been Royal Mint Master from 1536 until 1565, created a charitable housing development on a lot granted by the king in 1570. It became known as Poul Fechtels Hospital and was destroyed along with the rest of the street in the Copenhagen Fire of 1728 but rebuilt in 1732. Poul Fechtels Hospital moved to a new building on Frederikssundsvej in 1908 and its old buildings were demolished the following year when the street Christian IX2 Gade was created.

The so-called Brøndstræde Quarter, a run-down and crowded area between Møntergade and Landemærket to the north, was demolished in 1910 in the first public urban regeneration programme of its kind in the city.

== Notable buildings and residents ==
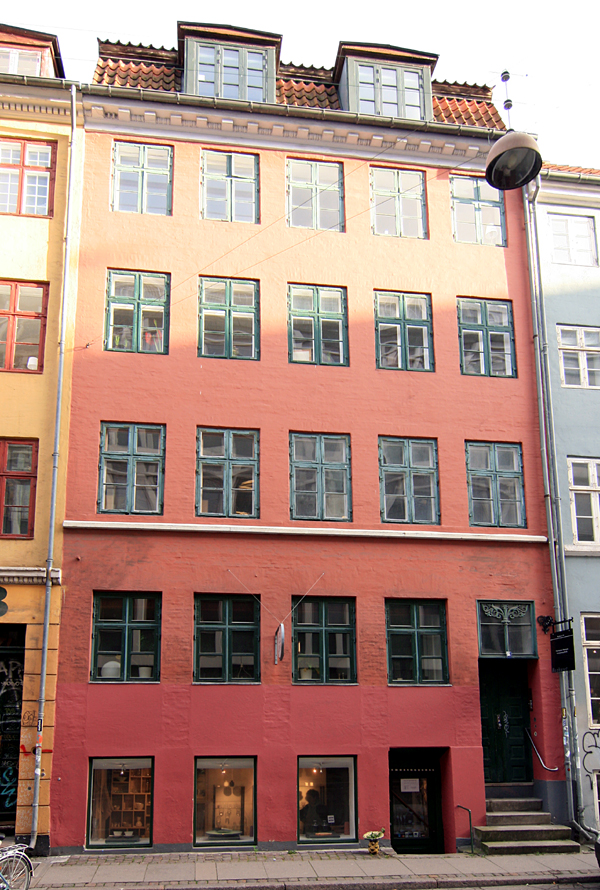
Møntergade 6

The even numbered house row at No. 4–16 date from the 1730s and the houses are all listed. The houses were originally examples of the so-called "fire houses" (Danish: Ildebrandshuse) that were built in large numbers after the Fire of 1728. Most of the houses have later been altered with the addition of extra floors and changes to the facades but the building on the corner of Gammel Mønt shows the original design. The red-brick building on the corner with Pilestræde is from the 1880s.

The Danish fashion brand Rabens Saloner opened a flagship store over three storeys in No. 10 in 2015.

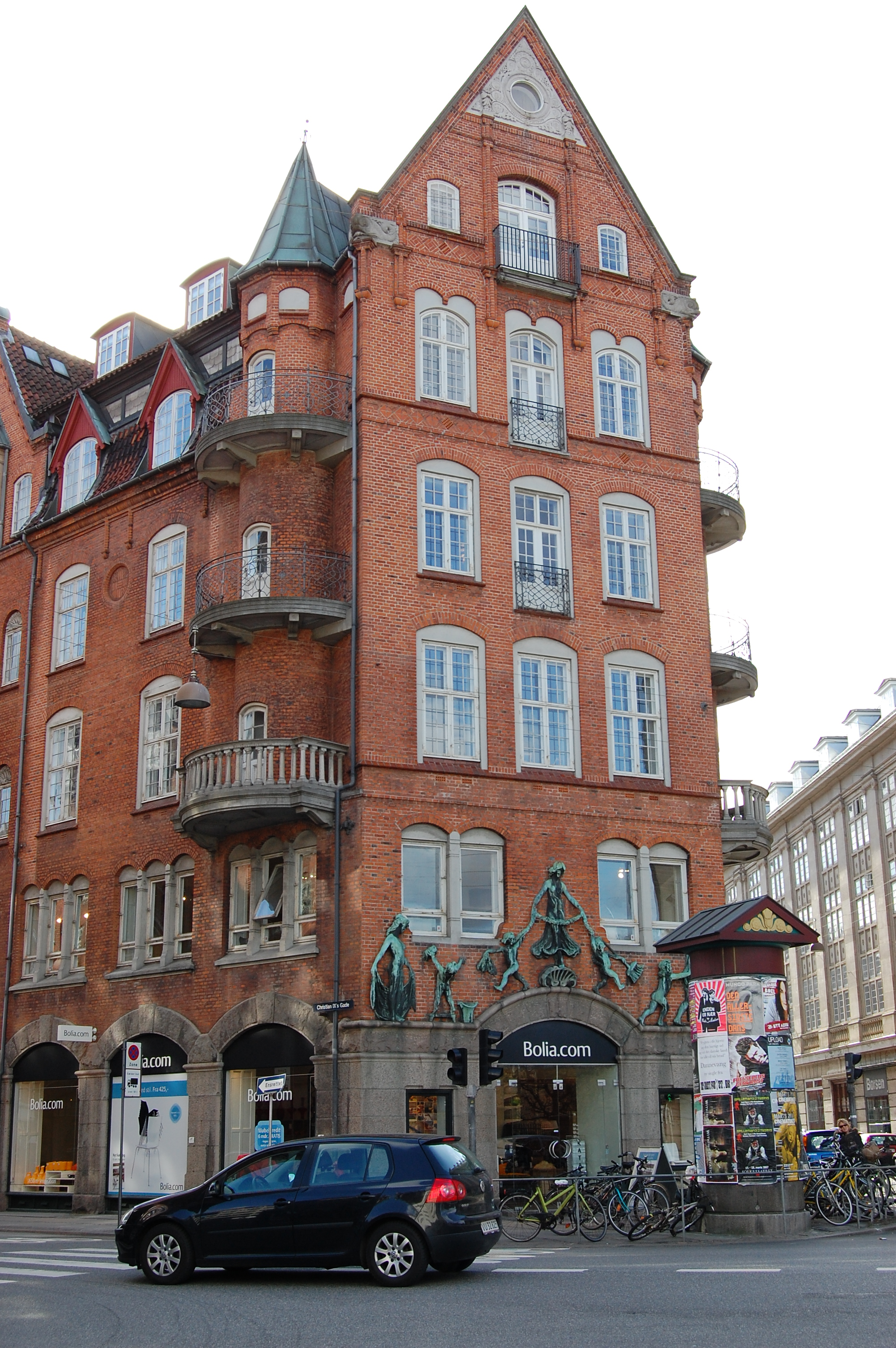
The corner of Christian IXs Gade (left) and Møntergade (right), just off Gothersgade

Egmont Group 's Guttenberghus Complex(No. 1-5) occupies the entire block on the other side of the street between Pilestræde and Vognmagergade. The wing on Møntergade is from 1962–64 and was designed by Preben Hansen Poul Andreasen. A colonnade runs along the full length of the block.

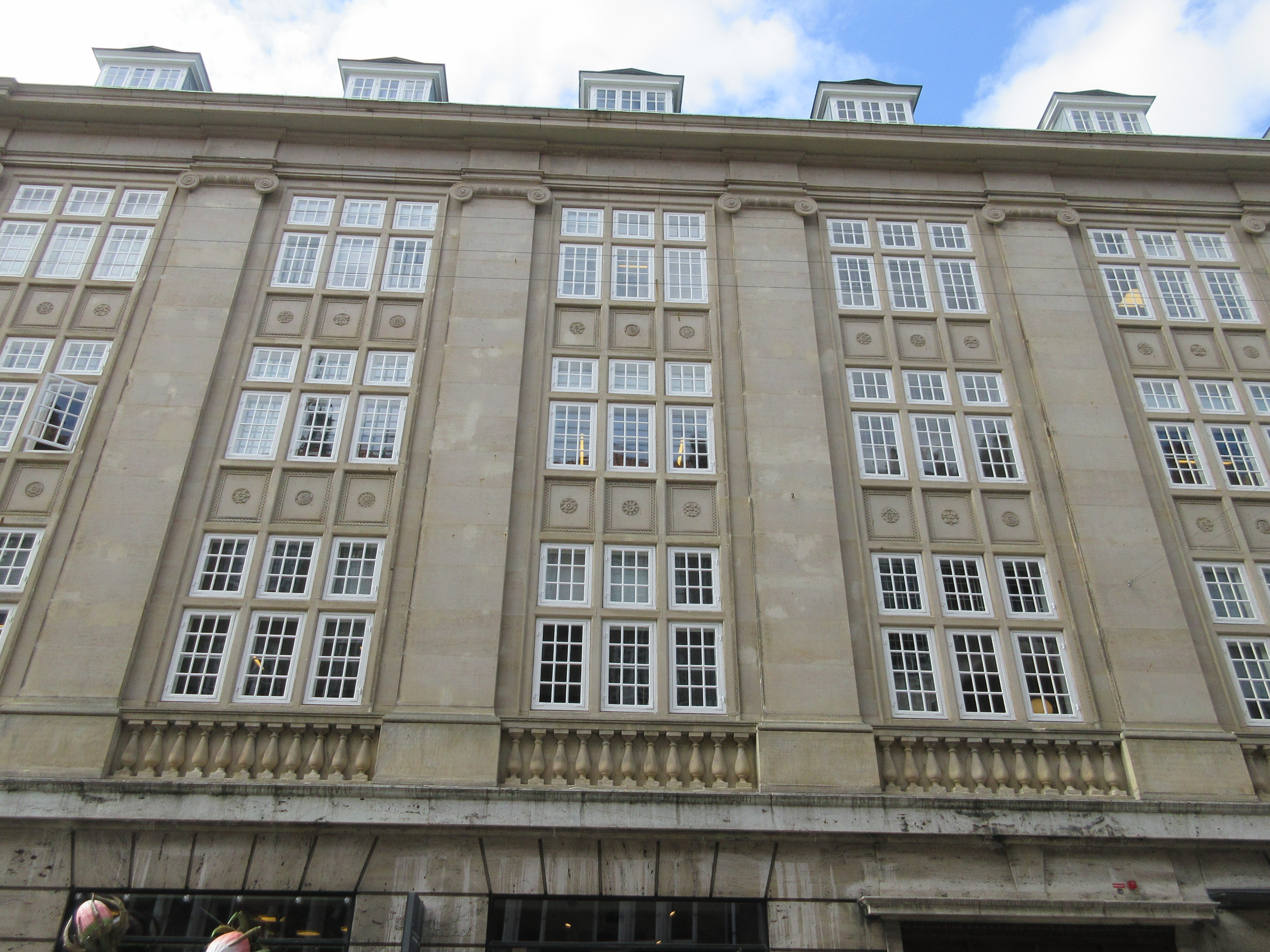
No. 19-21: Møntergården

Møntergården (No. 19-21), a monumental office block located on the other side of the Vognmagergade, was built in 1915–16 to design by H. P. Jacobsen for A. C. Illum. Jacobsen also worked for Illum on the expansion of the Illum department store. The furniture and design brand GUBI has a flagship store in the ground floor at No. 19.

The triangular block on the other side of Møntergade, opposite Møntergården, is from 1909 and was designed by Eugen Jørgensen.
