= Landemærket =

Street in Copenhagen, Denmark

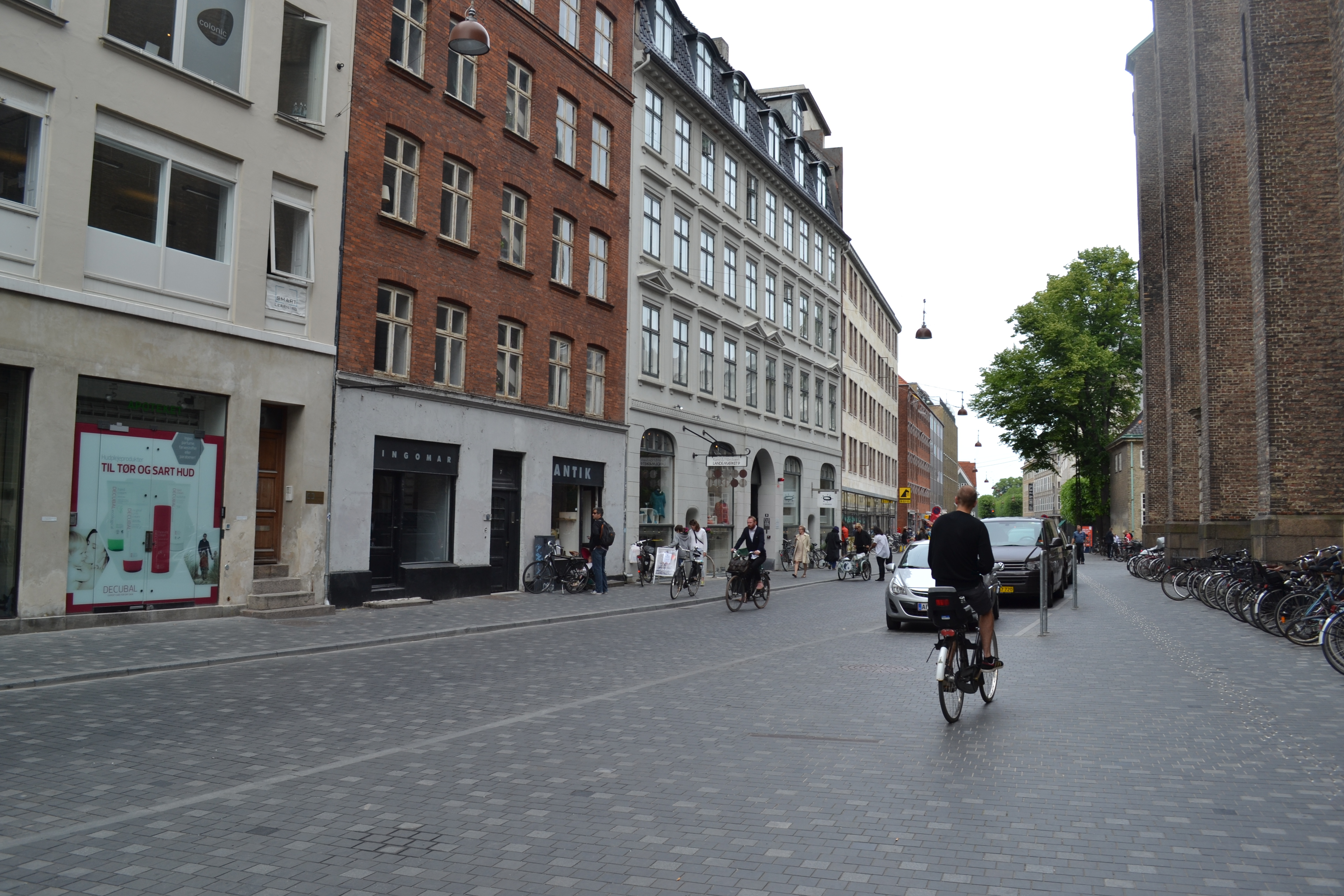
- Landemærket viewed from Købmagergade
- Length: 290 m (950 ft)
- Location: Copenhagen, Denmark
- Quarter: City centre
- Nearest metro station: Nørreport
- Coordinates: 55°40′57″N 12°34′37.2″E
- Southwest end: Købmagergade
- Northeast end: Gothersgade

Landemærket, literally "The Landmark", is a street in the Old Town of Copenhagen, Denmark. It extends from Købmagergade along the north side of the Trinitatis Complex (Round Tower and Trinitatis Church, Guttenberghus and the Film House to Gothersgade at Rosenborg Castle Gardens.

== History ==
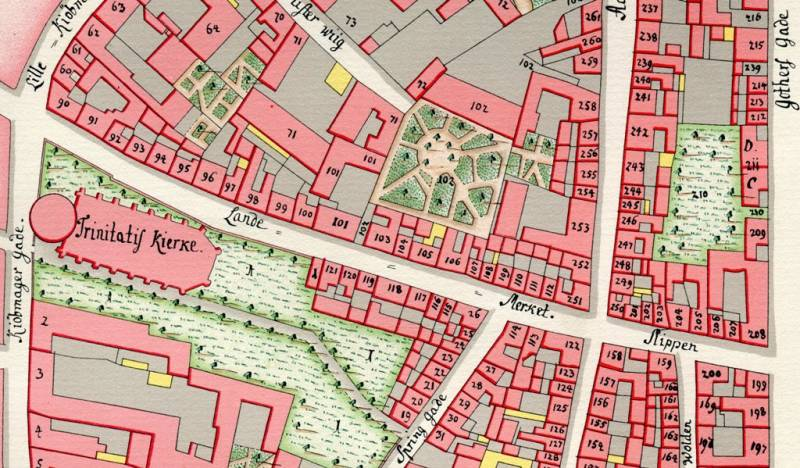
Landemærket seen on a detail from Gedde's district map

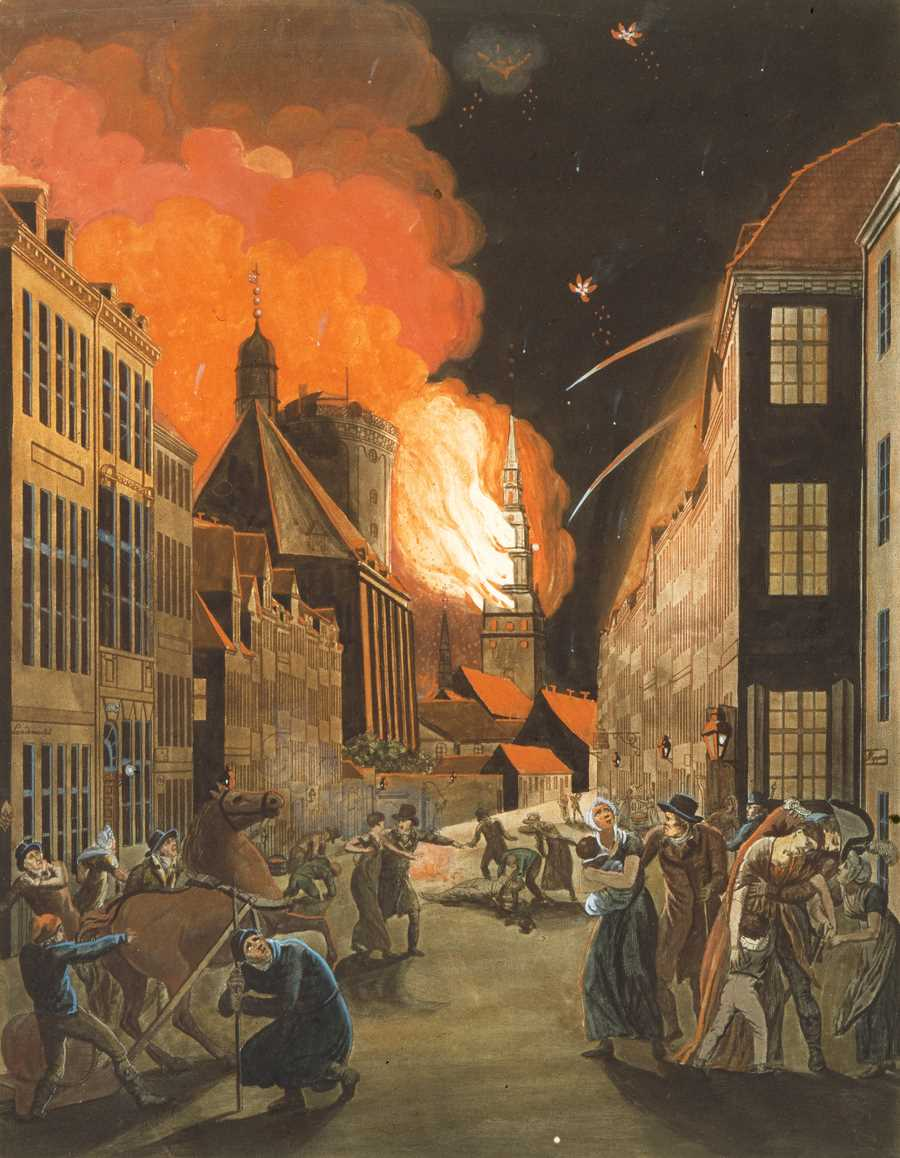
A view down Landemærket during the British bombardment of Copenhagen in 1807, painting by C. W. Eckersberg

The name Landemærket reflects the topographical situation in the late 16th century when the street marked the transition between the built-up area of the city and the last undeveloped lots within the city walls. On 23 October 1665, the last block of the street was called Slippen until 1873. The oldest surviving accounting records from Trinitatis Church lists an expense for "a hasp on the gate in the fence towards Landemerchett (German spelling)".

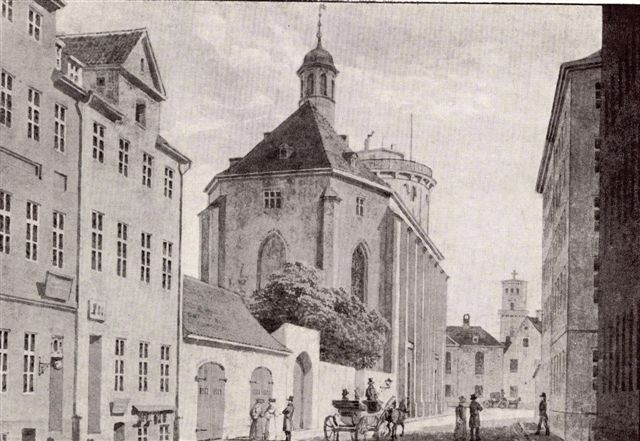
Landemærket viewed from Købmagergade

The street was from 1798 home to a row of small shops which were established along the wall that surrounded Trinitatis Church's graveyard to create an extra income for the church. They sold various goods, including tea and coffee, porcelain, stockings and bread. The wall was demolished and the shops removed in connection with a renovation of the church in 1817. The main entrance to the church was also moved from its south side to its current location on Landemærket. The last block of the street, from Aabenraa to Gothersgade, was called Slippen until 1887.

A small run-down area of houses between Landemærket and Møntergade, known as Brøndstrædekvarter, was demolished in 1910 in the first municipal urban renewal project of its kind.

== Notable buildings and residents ==
Trinity Church has its main entrance in the street at No. 4. The house row at No. 43–55 dates from the 1730. No. 55 is listed.

Copenhagen Business Academy has its headquarters at No. 11. The building also houses the administration and management of the school as well as a library.

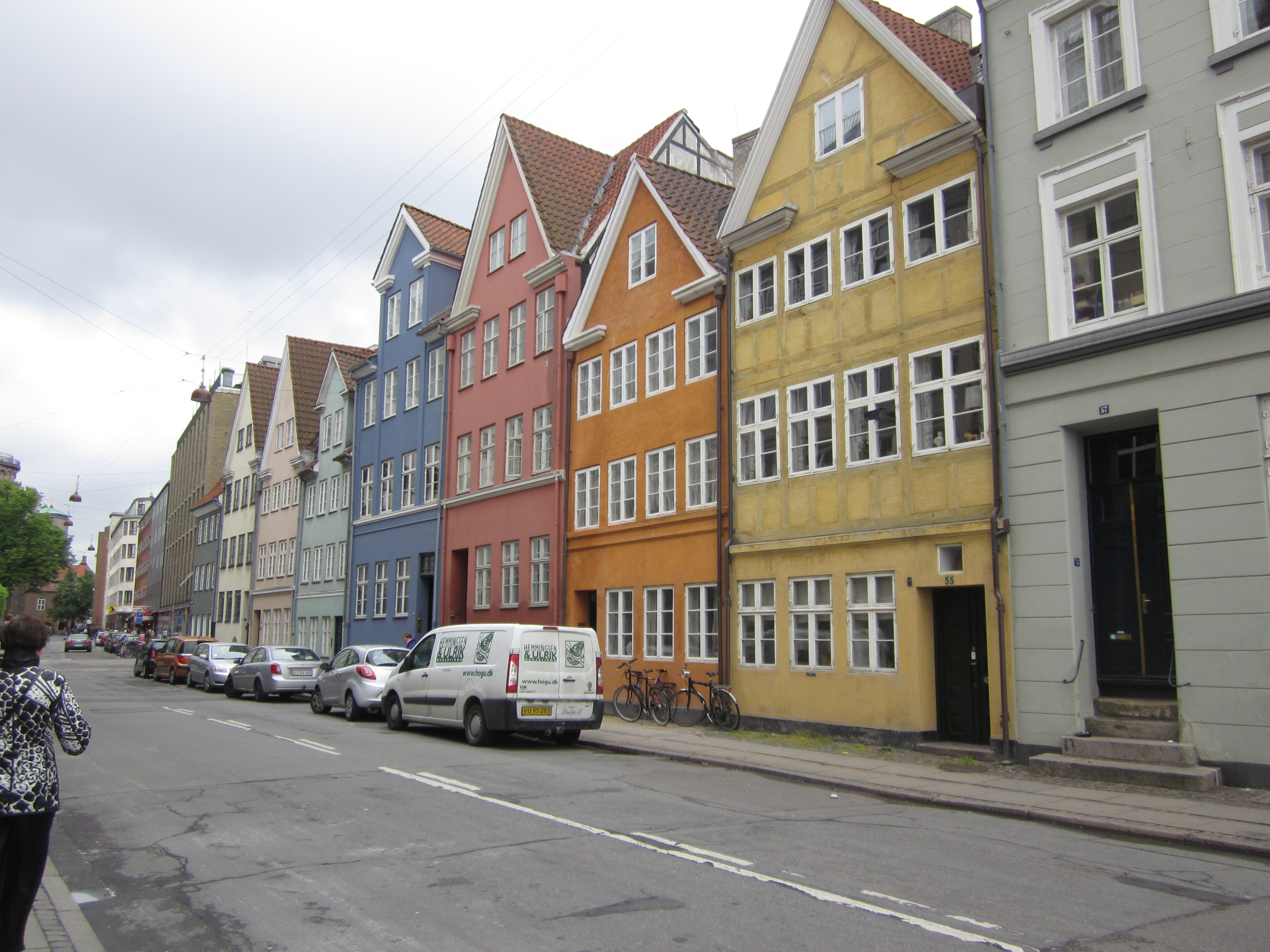
The house row at No. 43–55

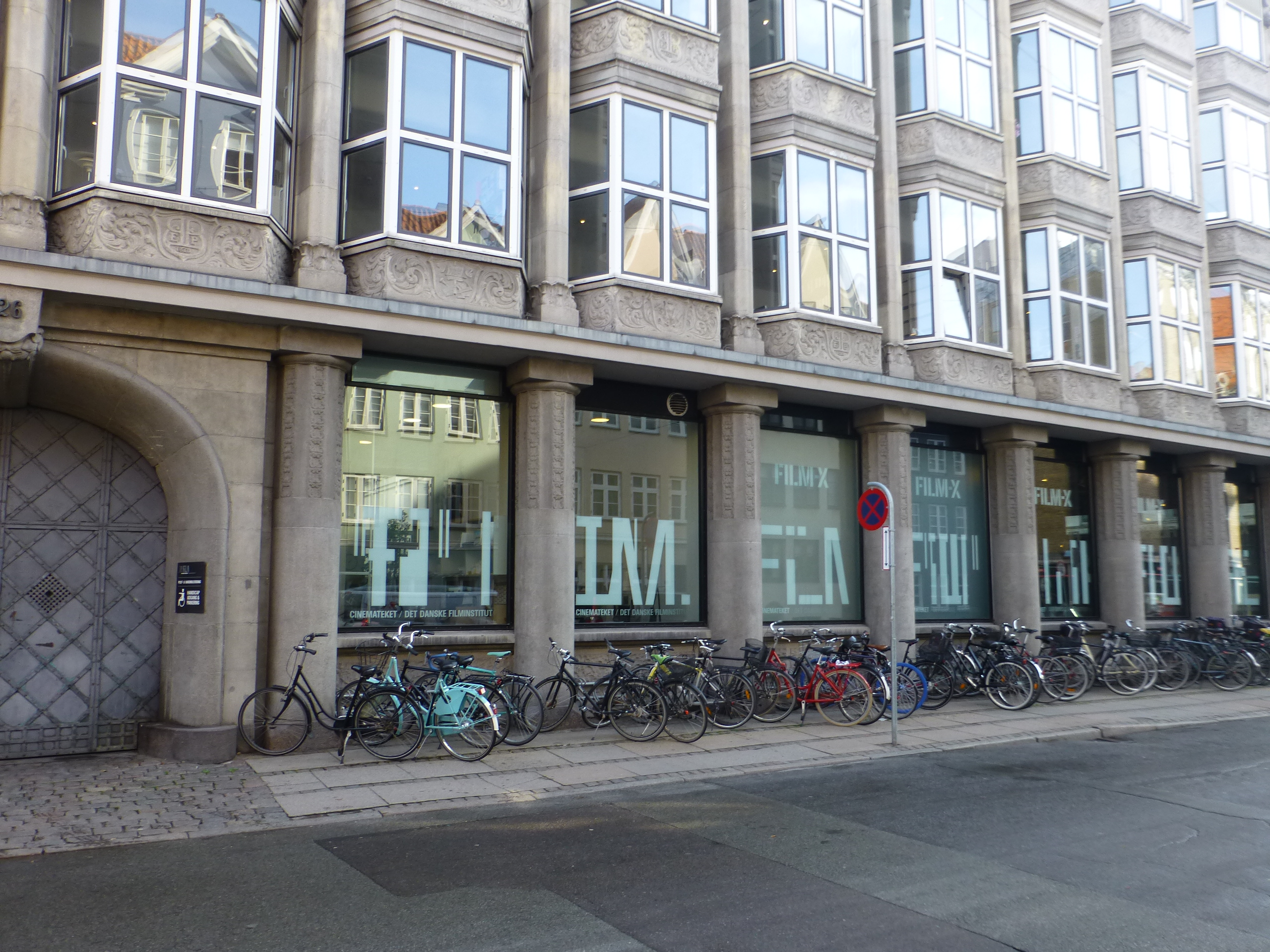

== See also ==
- Pilestræde
- Rosenborggade
