= Eugen Jørgensen =

Danish architect and politician

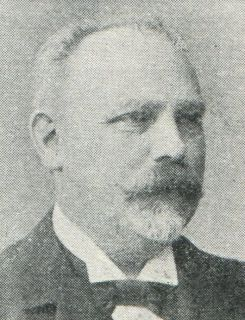
- Born: 13 May 1858; Frederikssund, Denmark
- Died: 1 September 1910 (aged 52); Copenhagen, Denmark
- Occupation: Architect

Eugen Jørgensen (13 May 1858 – 1 September 1910) was a Danish architect and local politician. His apartment building at Strandboulevarden 35 in Copenhagen has been listed on the Danish registry of protected buildings and places. Other works include Østerfælled Barracks and the belongs Christian IX's Gade.

== Early life and education ==
Jørgen was born on 13 May 1858 in Frederikssund, the son of Christian Erhard Jærgensen Veng (1827–1906) and Eugénie Françoise Eva Vincent (1834–1906). He graduated from Metropolitanskolen in 1875 and apprenticed as a mason before enrolling at the Royal Danish Academy of Fine Arts in 1877. He studied under Hans Jørgen Holm and graduated as an architect from the Academy in 1884. He won the Neuhausen Award in 1889.

== Career ==
Jørgensen started his independent career by working for the Danish army. He designed the army's new Equestrian School in Frederiksberg as well as Østervold Barracks in Østerbro. He later focussed more on designing large houses for wealthy customers in the Copenhagen area. Yjeu were designed in the so-called Mansion Style, introduced by Andreas Clemmesen some time earlier.

Jørgensen was a co-editor of the magazine Architekten from 1898 to 1905. He was a member of Copenhagen City Council from 1904 to 10. He was also involved in the work with creating a more formalized architect's education.

In 1906, Hørgensen was involved in the creation of the new street Christian IX's Gade. He was both involved in the consortium that developed it and designed all the buildings.

== Personal life ==
Jørgensen married Camilla Maria Permin (3 October 1858 – 27 January 1940) on 27 September 1887. He died on 1 September 1910 and is buried in Assistens Cemetery.

== Selected works ==
- Military Equestrian School, Kong Georgs Vej/Nordre Fasanvej 122, Frederiksberg (1890–1891, demolished)
- Østerfælled Barracks, Copenhagen (1896–1898, under instructions of engineer captain Bierring, adapted and partly demolished in 1993–1995)
- Østerbrogade 84, Copenhagen (1898–1900)
- Ringsted Børs, Ringsted (1897–1898)
- Villa Ejstrup, Hveensvej, Vedbæk (1903–1904)
- Kong Georgs Vej/Kronprinsesse Sophies Vej, Frederiksberg (1900)
- Strandboulevarden 35 (1902–1903, listed)
- Edvard Brandes' house, Olof Palmes Gade 8 (then Skjoldsgade), Copenhagen (1902–1903)
- Lykkens Gave (O.H. Bærentzen House), Fuglevadsvej, Kongens Lyngby (1903)
- Frederik VI's Allé 1–11, 2–14, Frederiksberg (1905)
- Christian IX's Gade, Copenhagen (1906–1910)

== Image gallery ==
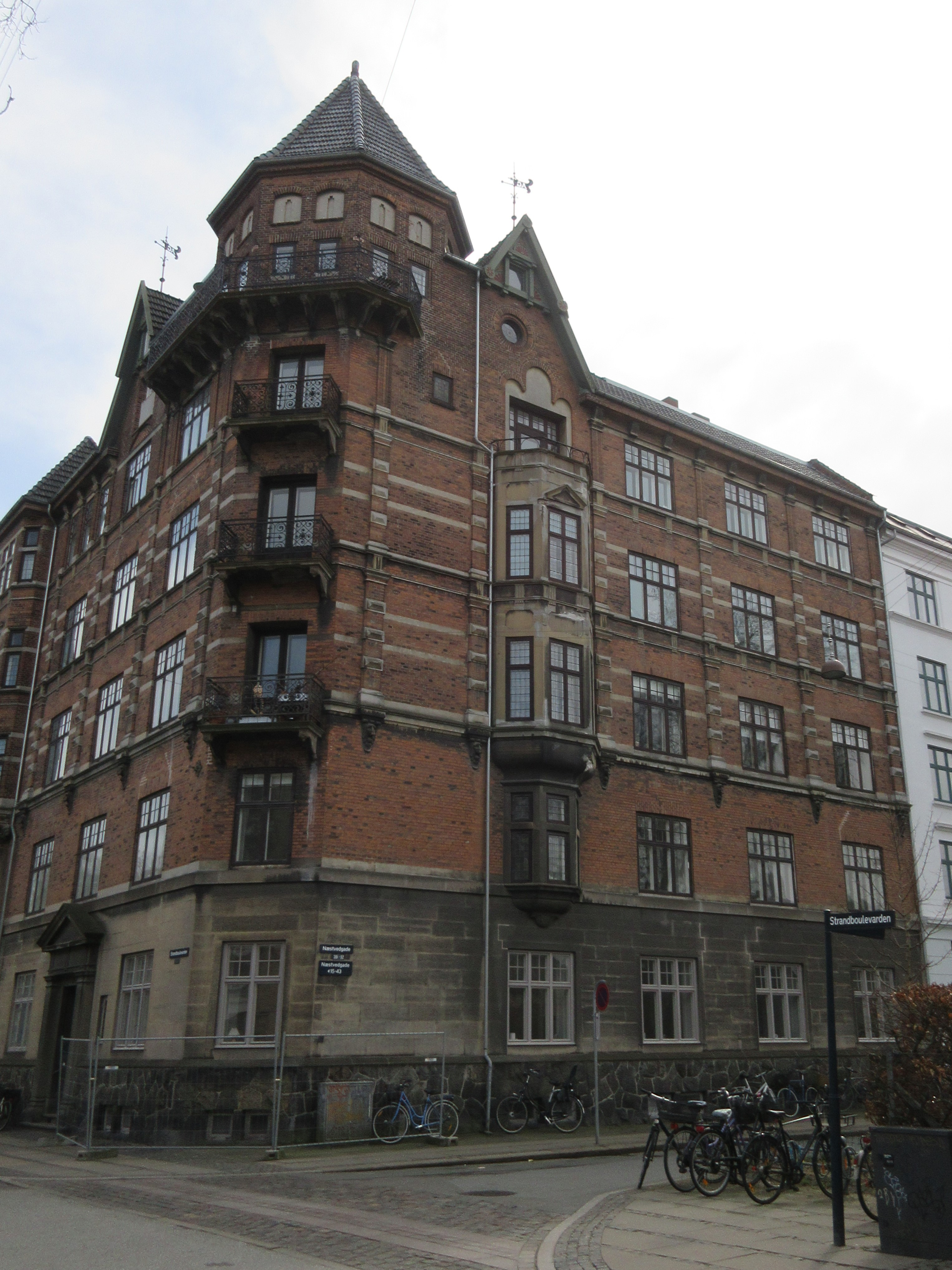
Strandboulevarden 35

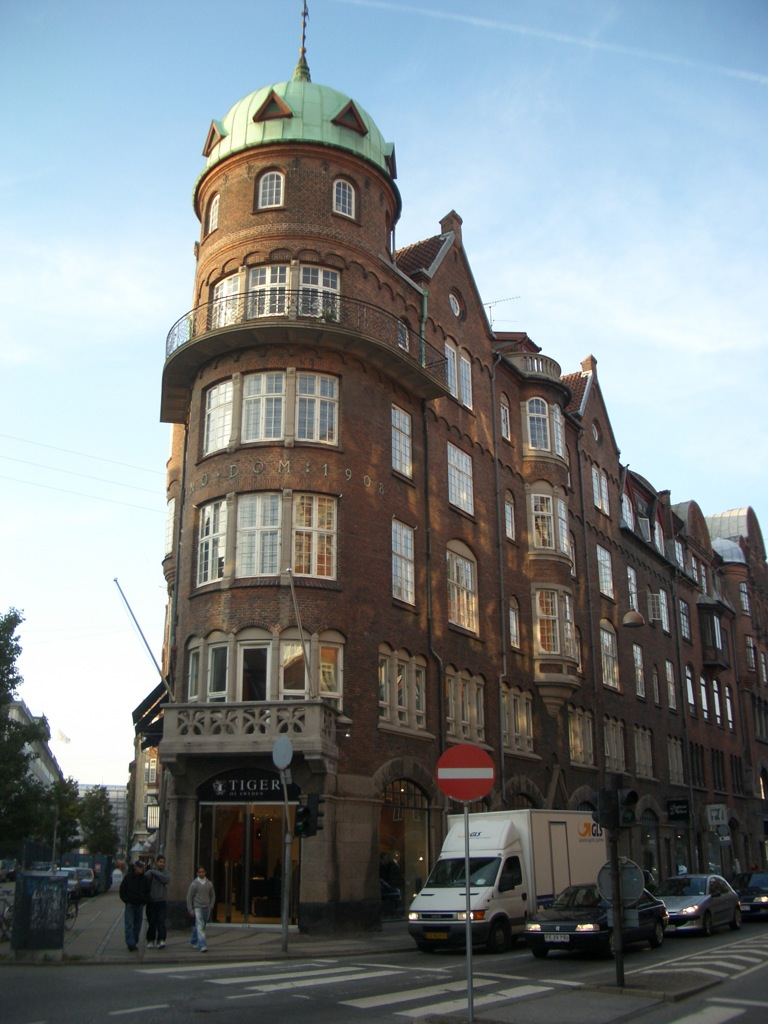
Christian IX's Gade

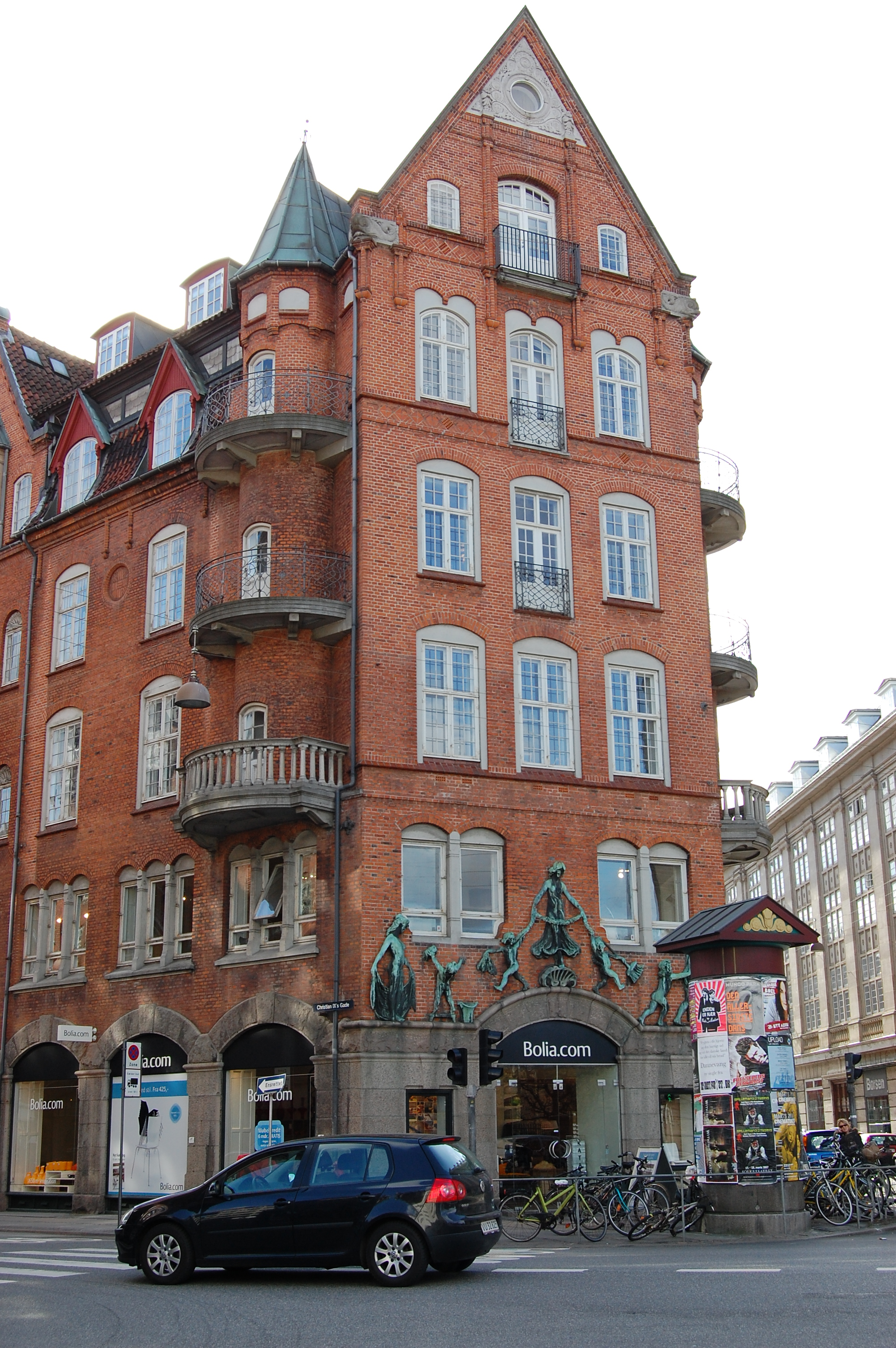
Christian IX's Gade

== Kunstindeks Danmark ==
- Eugen Jørgensen at Kunstindeks Danmark
