= Købmagergade 38 =

Building in Copenhagen, Denmark

Købmagergade 39
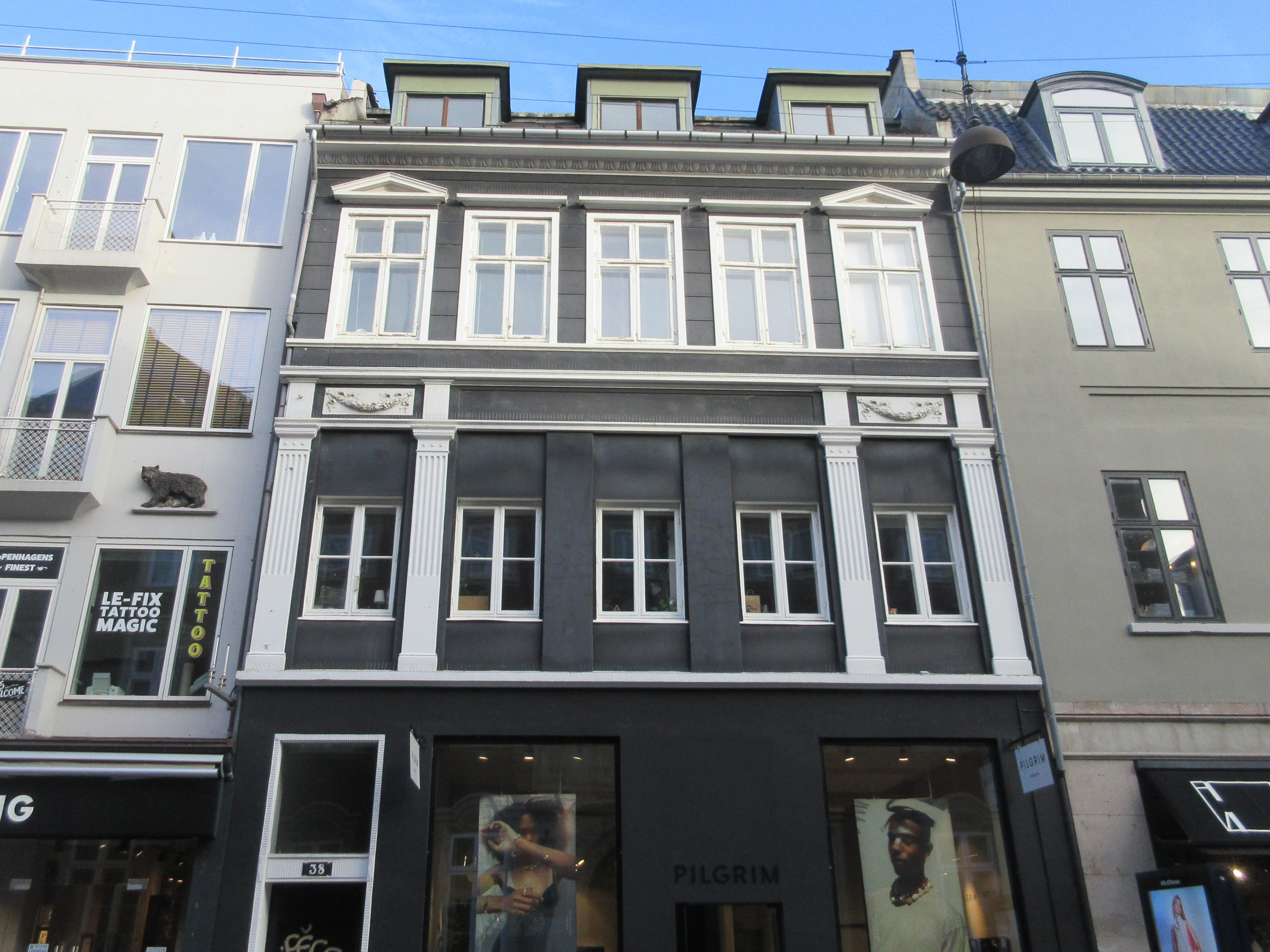
- Interactive map of the Købmagergade 39 area

General information
- Location: Copenhagen, Denmark
- Coordinates: 55°40′50″N 12°34′42″E
- Completed: 1795

Købmagergade 38 is a building on Købmagergade in Copenhagen, Denmark. C. G. Iversen's Bookshop (Danish: C. G. Iversen's Boghandel) was located in the building from 1846 to 1857. It was later continued as Tillge's Bookshop (Danish: Tillge's Boghandel), first by E. S.Tillge and then by his son Holger Tillge. E. S. Tillge's brother, Vilhelm Tillge, operated a photographic studio in the building from 1873 to 1893.

== History ==
=== Site history, 1689–1799 ===
In the late 17th century, the site was part of a large property owned by Conrad von Reventlow (1644–1708). This property was listed in Copenhagen's first cadastre from 1689 as No. 44 in Købmager Quarter. After Reventlow's death in 1708, the property was passed to his son Christian Detlev Reventlow (1671–1738). The buildings were destroyed in the Copenhagen Fire of 1728 but subsequently rebuilt.

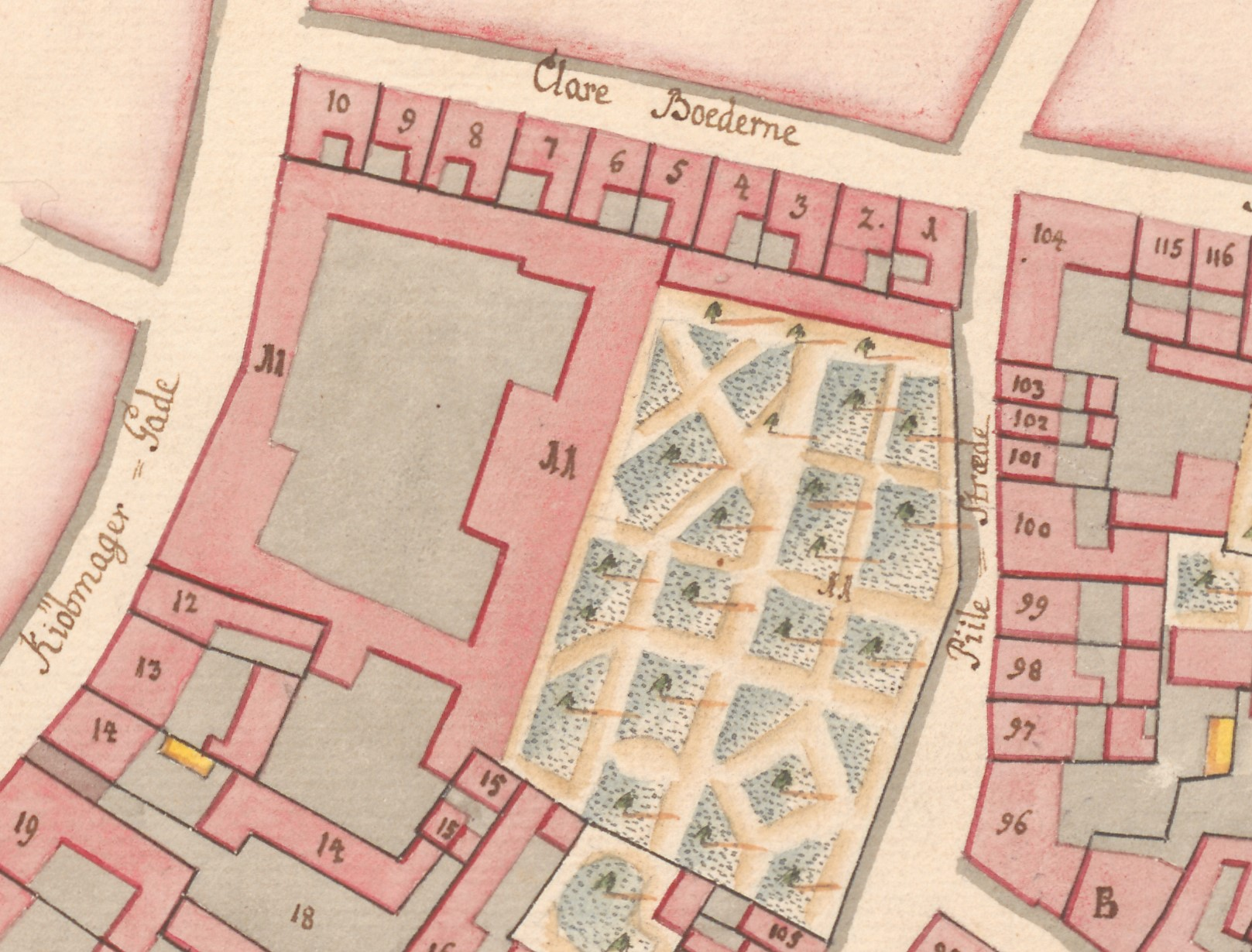
No. 11 seen on a detail from Christian Gedde's map of Købmager Quarter, 1757.

On Christian Ditlev Reventlow's death, the property passed to his son Christian Ditlev Reventlow. The property was listed in the new cadastre of 1756 as No. 11 in Købmager Quarter. It was referred to as Reventlow's Hotel at that time. A large four-winged building complex surrounding a central courtyard occupied the half of the property that faced the more prominent street Købmagergade. The half of the property that faced the quieter street Pilestræde was the site of a large garden complex. A row of small properties separated the property from Klareboderne in the northwest.

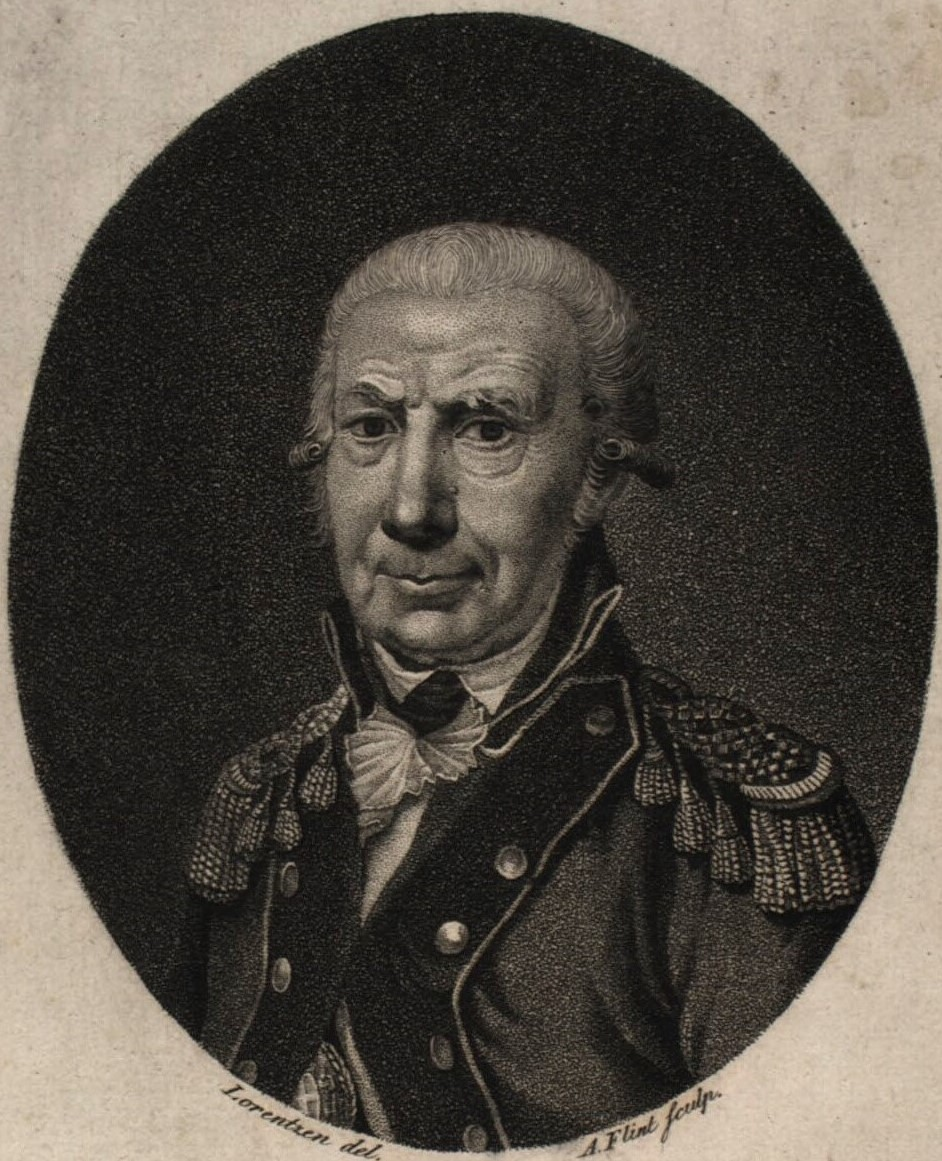
Johan Peter Boye Junge

In 1783 the property was acquired by the master builder Johan Peter Boye Junge (1735–1807), who was shortly thereafter granted royal permission to establish the new street Kronprinsensgade on the land. Boye Junge was one of the largest private employers in Copenhagen of his time.

The row of new buildings on Pilestræde and some of the ones in Krpinprinsensgade were constructed by Boye Junge. The other properties, including the one now known as Købmagergade 38, were sold to others.

=== Early history ===
The present building on the site was constructed in 1799. In the new cadastre of 1806, the property was listed as No. 9 in Købmager Quarter. It was at that time still owned by Knud Erneberg.

When Georg Nikolaus von Nissen and Constance Mazaart, moved to Copenhagen from Vienna in 1812 they initially lived in the building for around a year. In 1813, Nissen bought a property at the corner of Lavendelstræde and Kattesundet.

=== Residents, 1840–1845 ===
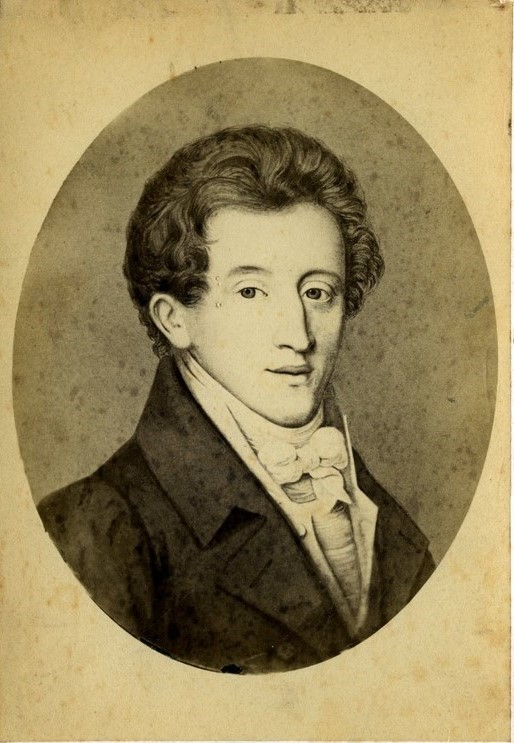
Dorthea Bolette v. Stöcken.

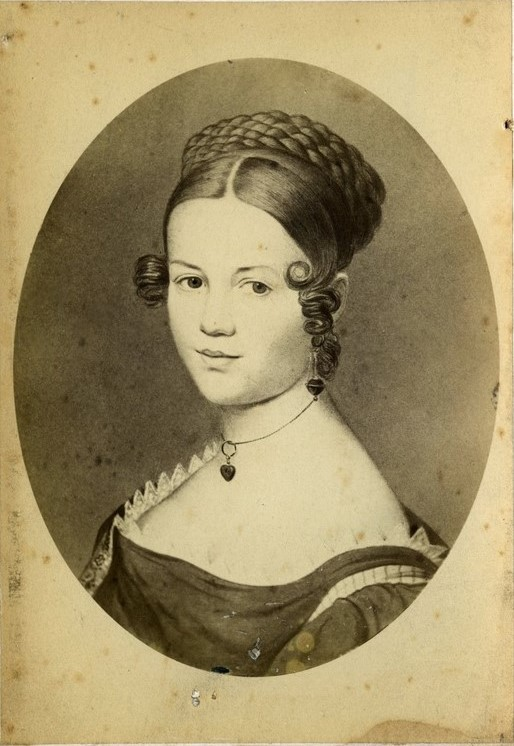
August Peter Tillge.

The property was home to 20 residents in four households at the 1840 census. August Peter Tillge (1794–1850), an employee at the post office on the other side of the street, resided on the second floor with his wife Dorthea Bolette Yoææge (1800–1856, née von Stöcken), their five children (aged two to 14) and three maids. Ludvig Adolph Thayssen, an employee at the post office on the other side of the street, resided on the first floor with his wife Marianne Frederikke Døcher and 24-year-old Ane Margrethe Larsen. Ole Petersen, a draper (silke- og klædehandler), resided on the ground floor with an apprentice. Jens Andersen Skou, a flour and oats retailer, resided in the basement with his wifeCaroline Stepansen and their three children (aged three to eight).

Prior to the 1845 census, Tillge and his family moved to Kronprinsensgade No. 40 (now Kronprinsensgade 2). Prior to the 1850 census, the family had moved to Kronprinsensgade No. 37 (now Kronprinsensgade 8).

At the time of the 1845 census, No. 9 was home to 15 residents in three households. Ludvig Adolph Thayssen, director of the Department for Private Letters /personbrevskontoret), resided on the Personpostkontoret (1806-1868), resided on the first floor with his wife ariane Frederikke (née Døcker, 1806-1883), their four-uear-old son Ludvig Peter Gerhard Clemens Thayssen and two maids. Anton Wilhelm Henningsen, a new draper (silke- og klædehandler), resided on the ground floor and second floor of the building with his wife Andrea Cecilie Henningsen, their five-year-old daughter Louise Georgine Henningsen, his miother-in-law Inger Louise Sørensen, a draper (employee), a draper's apprentice and a maid. Mads Peter Fonnesbech, another fashion retailer (modehandler), resided in the building with his wife Antoinette N. Fonnsebech and one maid.

=== Bookshop, 1846–1903 ===
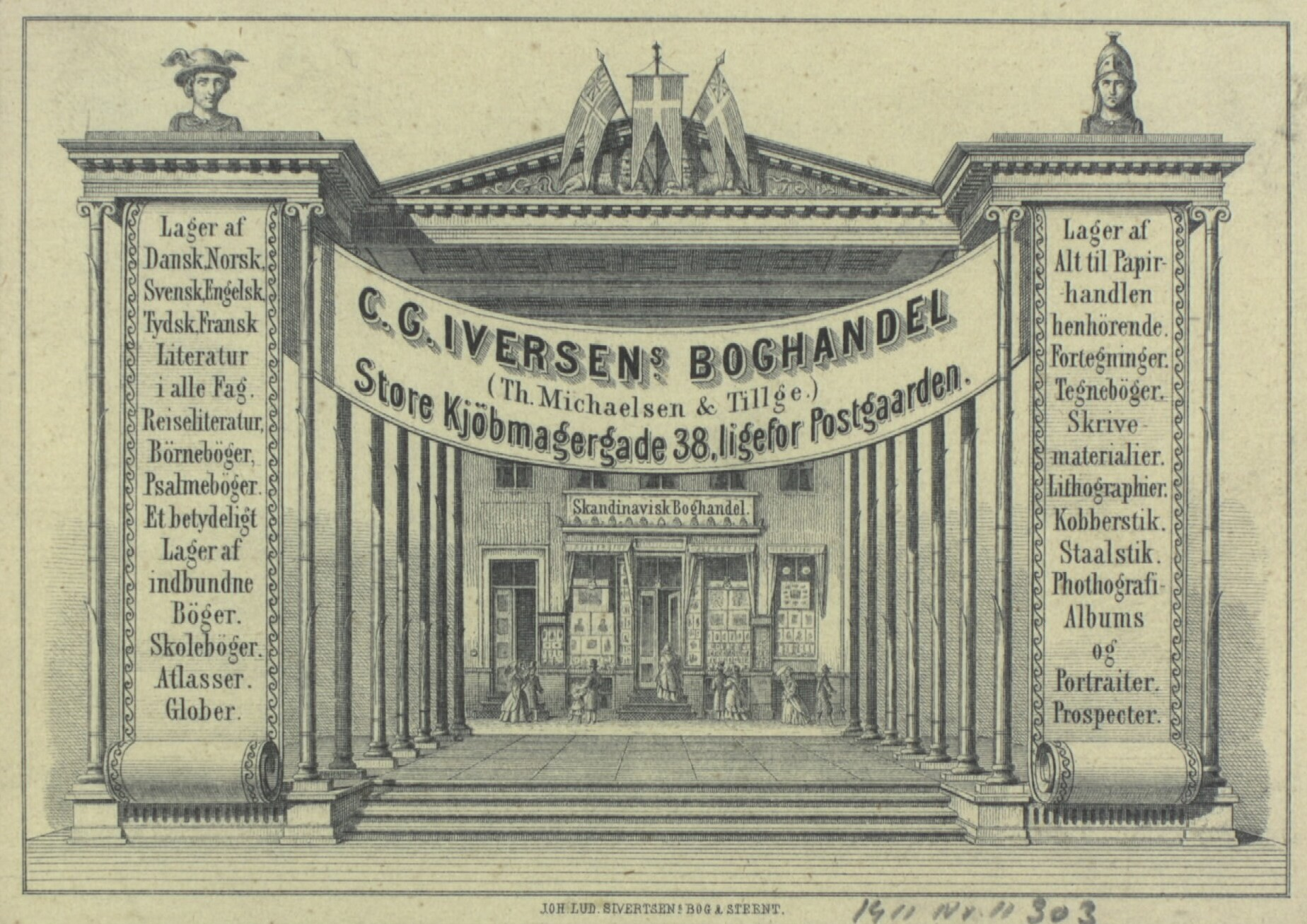
Advert for C. C. Iversen.

Tillge's eldest daughter Sidsel Dorothea Elise Augusta Tillge was married to bookseller Christian Gellert Iversen (1816-1881). On 14 May 1846, C. G. Iversen established a bookshop in the building. He was also active as a publisher. He was the first Danish bookdealer with regular correspindance with English publishers. On 1 September 1854, he also founded Forlagsbureauet in partnership with Gyldendal (based around the corner at Klareboderne 3) and Lose & Delbanco.

At the 1850 census, No. 9 was only home to three households. Christian and Dorothea Iversen resided on the ground floor and first floor with the apprentice Carl Magnussen and one maid. Hans Jørgen Nielsen, a clothing retailer (manufakturhandler), resided on the second floor with his wife Sine Chatrine Nielsen, their three children (aged one to four), his father Niels Nielsen (former grocer) and one maid.

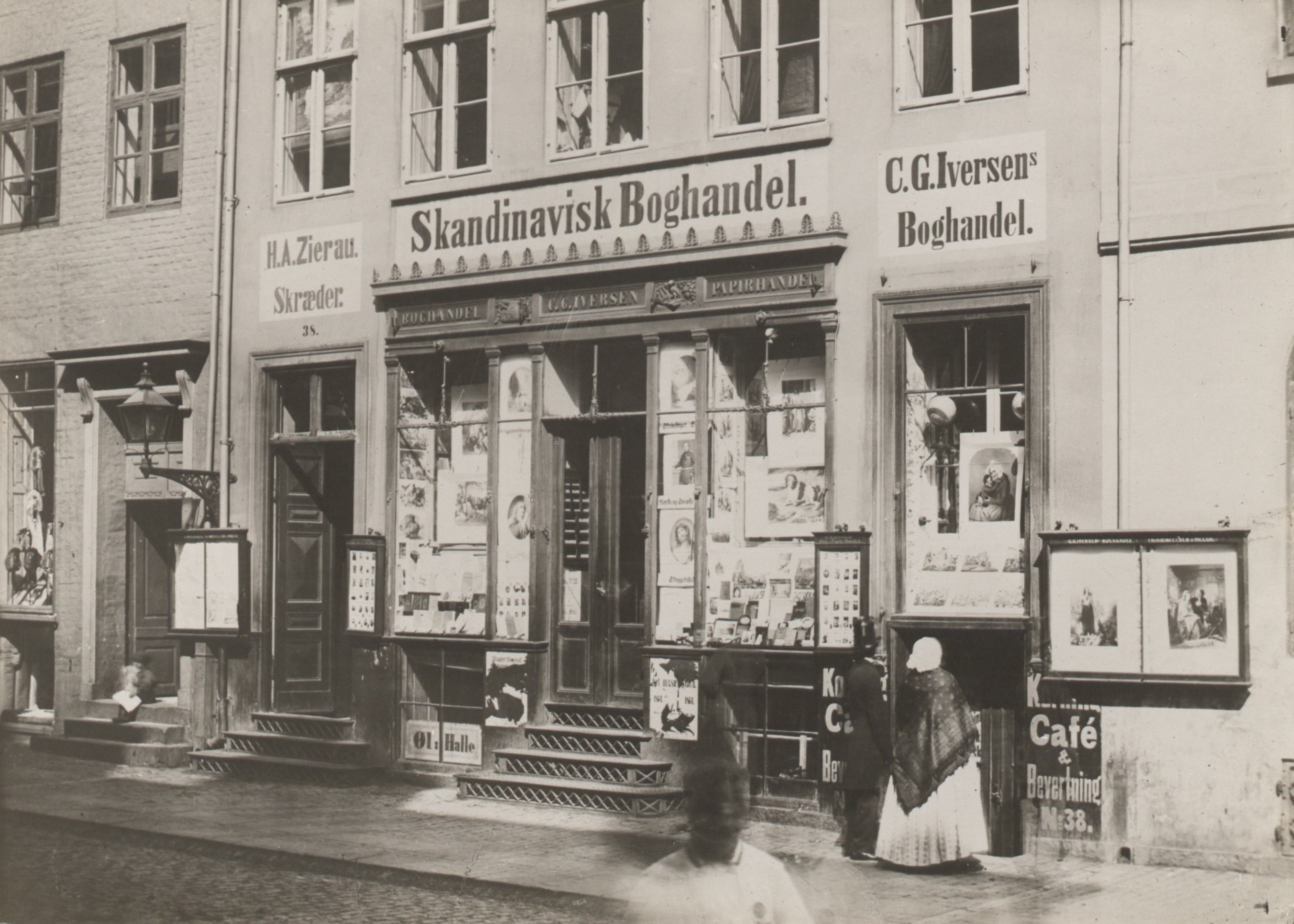
Skandinavisk Boghandel in 1864.

In 1855, he was engaged as a commissioner by Bokförläggareföreningen in Stockholm, The name of his bookshop was subsequently changed to Skandinavisk Boghandel.

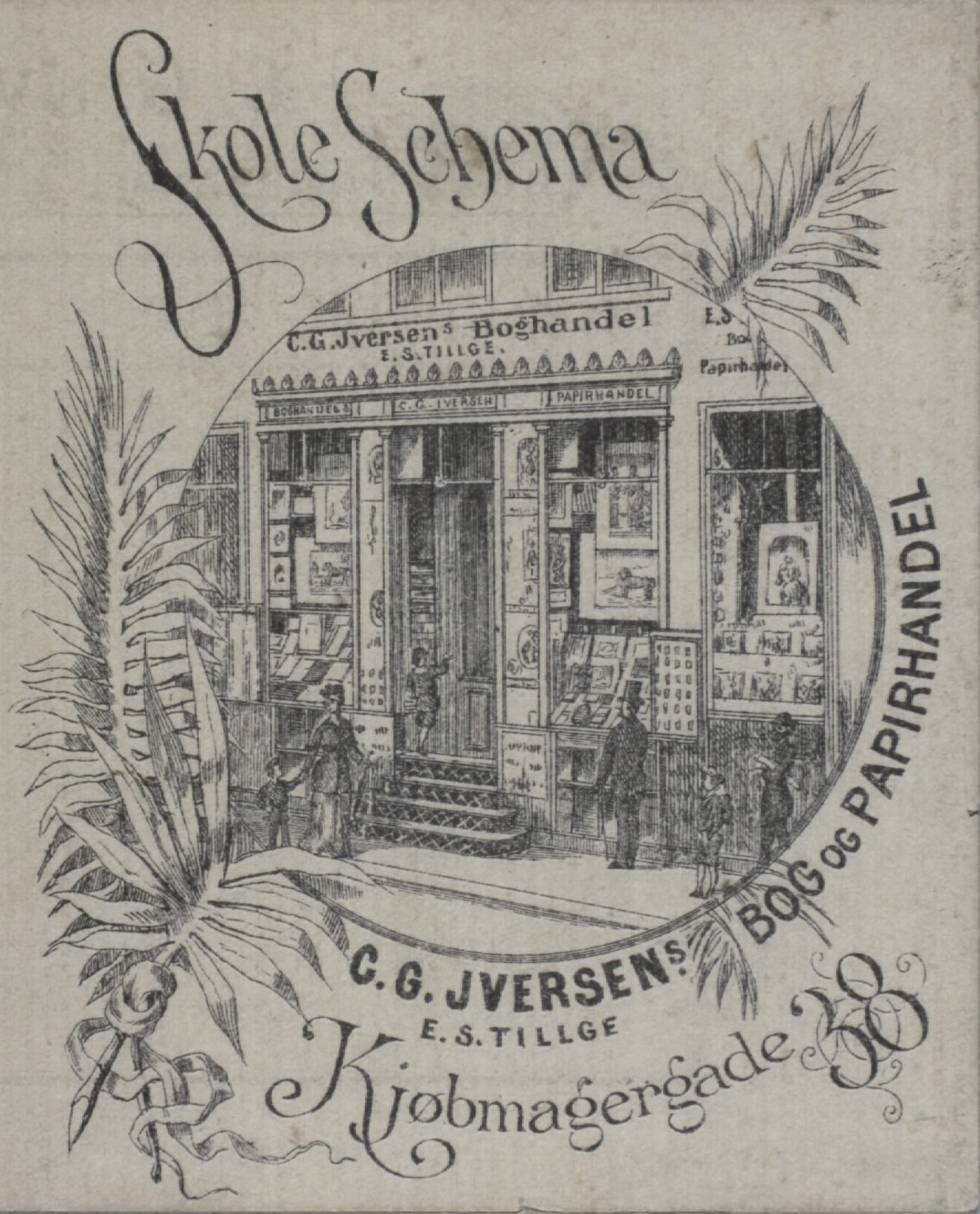
Advert for V. G. Iversen.

On 1 January 1857, Iversen passed the bookshop to his former apprentice Th. Michaelsen (1830-1907) and his brother-in-law E.S. Tillge (1834–95). The name of the firm was subsequently changed to C.G. Iversens Eftf., Michaelsen & Tillge. The publishing arm of the firm was later taken over by E.L. Thaarup. Tillge was also active as a publisher.

On 19 July 1869, Michaelsen left the firm. He established a new bookshop at No. 6 (later moved to Gammel Strand 30).

On 30 October 1875, Tillge went bankrupt. On 7 October 1876, he was able to reopen the bookshop. In 1892, he took his son Holger Tillge (1865-) as partner. On 1 October 1895, Holger Tillge became the sole owner of the firm. Its fifty years anniversary was celebrated in 1896. In 1788, it was taken over by Rud. Kleins Eftf. (Th. Sørensen).

=== 1860 census ===
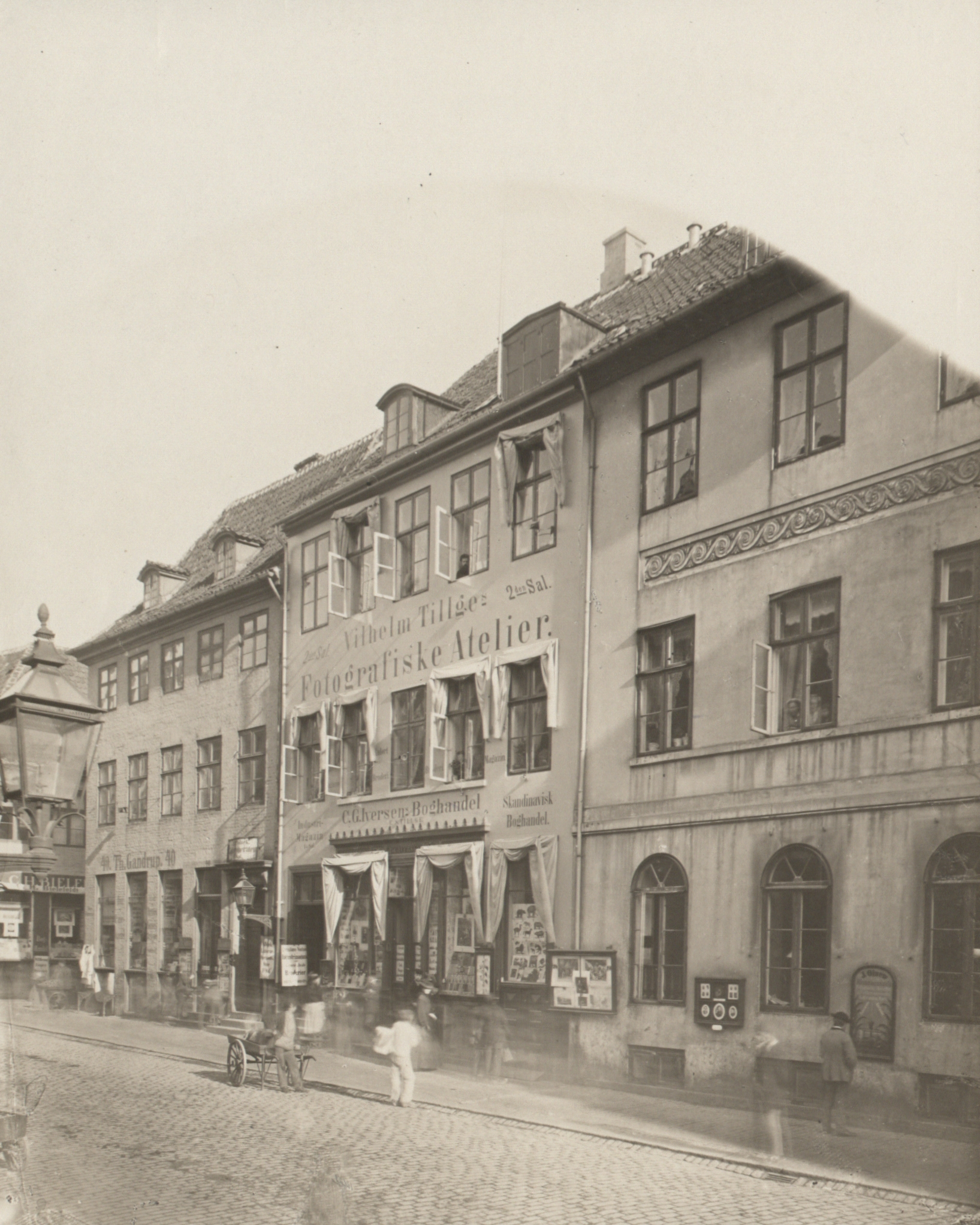
The building in the 1870s.

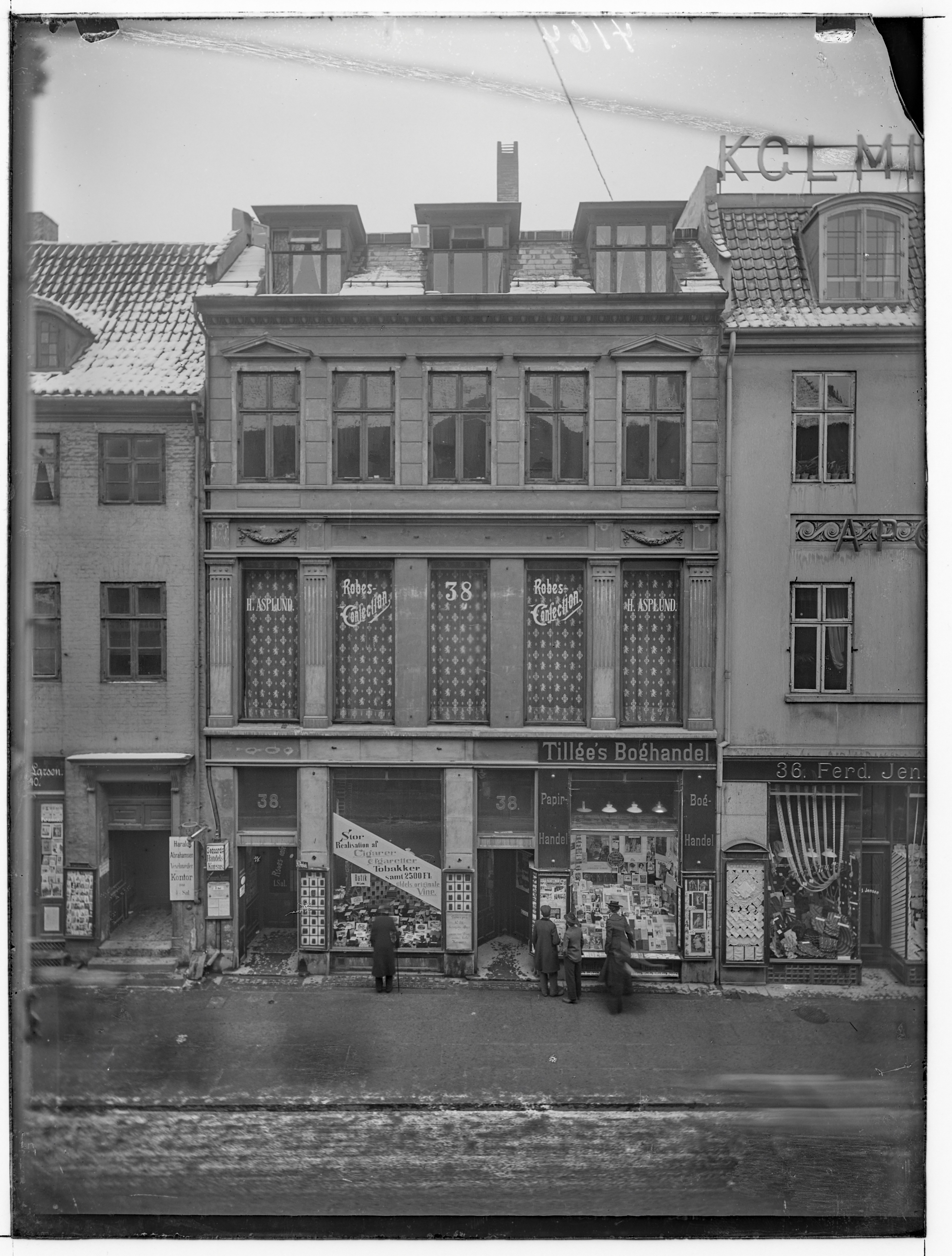
The building with Tillge's Bookshop, 1903.

The property was home to four households at the 1860 census. Hans Jensen, a barkeeper, resided in the building with his three children (aged 13 to 22) a housekeeper and a maid. Carl Christian Schwadahl, a tailor employed at master tailor H. A. Zieraus Etablisement, resided in the building with his wife Nicoline Rosalia Caroline Schwadahl, their one-year-old son and one maid. Marie Frederikke Schwartzkopf, an unmarried woman in her 50 with means, resided in the building with one maid.

=== Vilhelm Tillge's photographic studio, 1873–1893 ===
In 1873, Vilhelm Tillge moved his photographic studio to the second floor of the Købmagergade 38. Prior to that, he had operated photographic studios at Bjergegaden 282 in Helsingør (1862 to 186), Frederiksberg Allé 36 in Copenhagen (1865-1867) and Stengaden 258 in Helsingør (1868-1873).

=== 20th century ===
On 15 September 1913, P. E. Bluhme /-1733( acquired the bookshop. He had until then operated a bookshop under his own name at Linds Allé 13 in Vanløse. On 20 February 1934, Aage Meibom (1909-) took over the firm. In 1939, he moved the bookshop to Vanløse. The name was changed to Aage Meiboms Bog- og Papirhandel.

Charles Schæffer's gentlemen's clithing shop and Bluhme's nookshop were later based on the ground floor. Nordisk Annonce Bureai occupied the first floor.

== Architecture ==
Købmagergade 38 is a give bays wide, three storey building. The plastered facade is rendered in a charcoal grey colour with white-painted decorative details. The two outer windows on the first floor are flanked by fluted pilasters and topped by festoon reliefs.The second-floor windows, are visually brought together by a white-painted cill course. They are also accented with white framing and the two outer windows are tipped by triaugular pediments. The building's main entrance is located in the bay furthest to the left. The roof features three dormer windows towards the street.

== Today ==
Købmagergade 38 is now owned by E/F Købmagergade 38.
