= Gyldendal (disambiguation) =

Gyldendal may refer to:

- Gyldendal, a Danish publishing house
- Gyldendal Norsk Forlag, a Norwegian publishing house founded as a demerger from the Danish one
- Søren Gyldendal, the founder of the Danish publishing house
