= Klareboderne =

Street in Copenhagen, Denmark

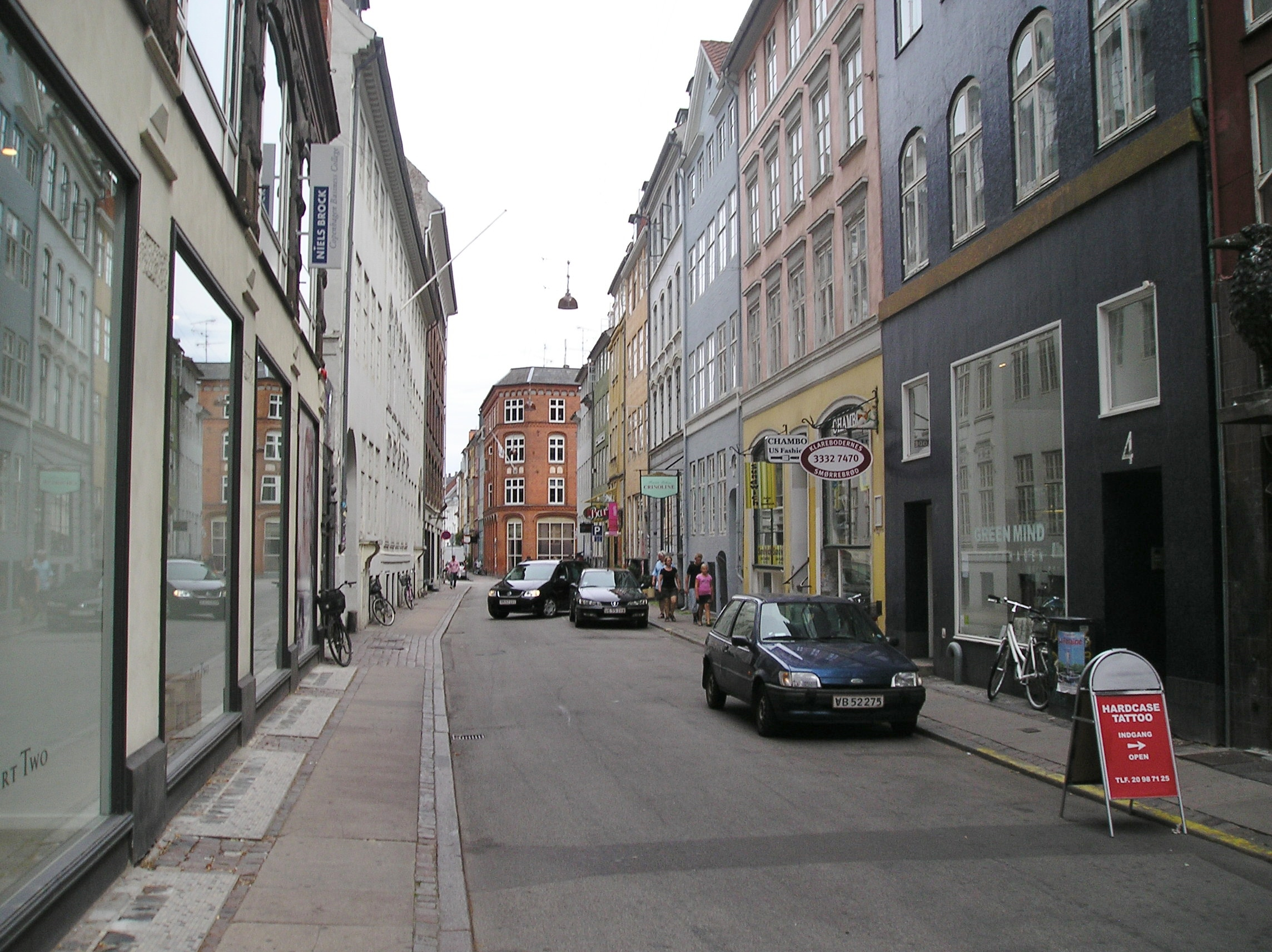
- Interactive map of Klareboderne
- Length: 95 m (312 ft)
- Location: Indre By, Copenhagen, Denmark
- Postal code: 1115
- Nearest metro station: Nørreport
- Coordinates: 55°40′51.6″N 12°34′42.24″E

Klareboderne is a street in the Old Town of Copenhagen, Denmark. It runs from Købmagergade in the west to Pilestræde in the east where it turns into Møntergade and continues to Gothersgade. The Gyldendal publishing house is based in the Gyldendal House at No. 3.

== History ==
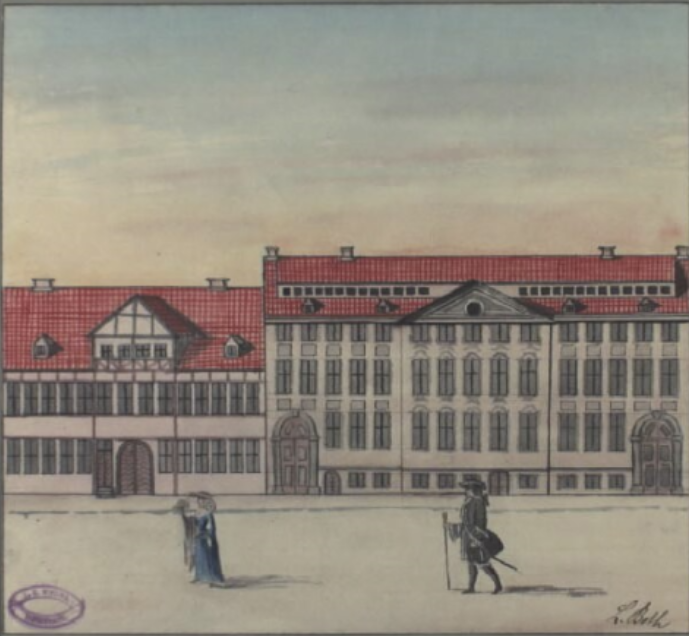
Klareboderne with the Sten House where Gyldendal is now based in 1749

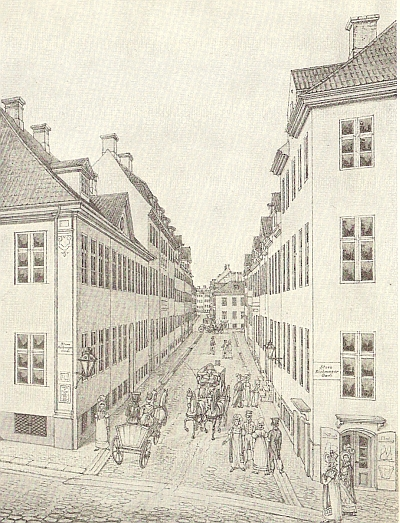
A view down Klareboderne from Købmagergade on a drawing by Heinrich Gustav Ferdinand Holm, 1923

The street name refers to St. Clare's Monastery which was established at the eastern end of the street in 1493. The name is known from at least 1518 when a document mentions "Albritt van Gocks bod her, som nu kallis Clare bodher" ("Albritt van Gock's houses which are now called Clar'e houses". Later in the century the street was variously referred to as "Clara Stræde" (Clara's Alley) and "Clara boder". The monastery closed after the Reformations and its buildings were used for a time for other purposes before its site was builtover between 1631 and 1650.

== Notable buildings and residents ==
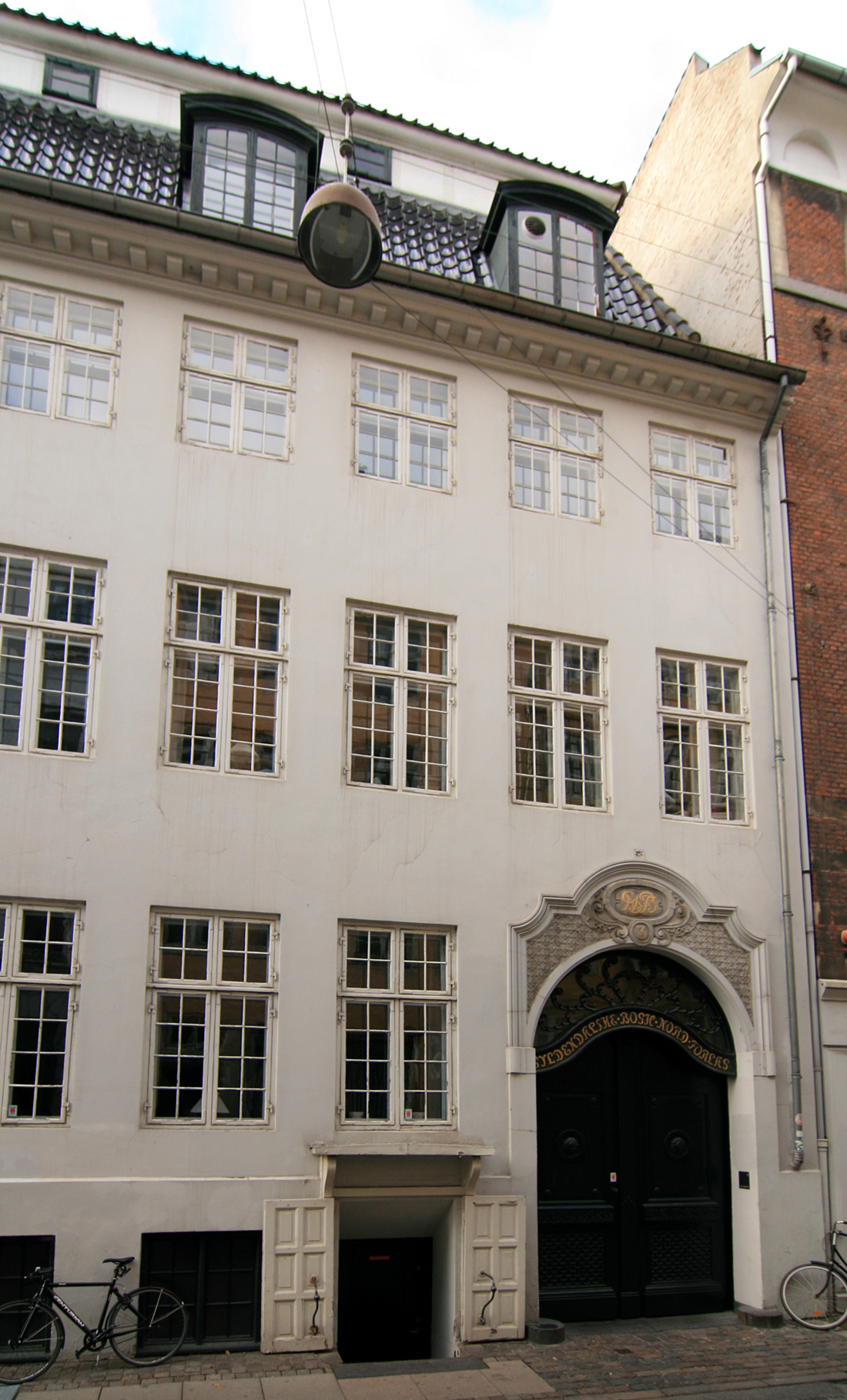
Gyldendal

No. 1 is the former Messen department store which fronts Købmagergade. The building was designed by Emil Blichfeldt and completed in 1895.

Gyldendal, Denmark's largest publishing house, is based at No. 3. The building dates from the 1730s and housed Borgerdydskolen ("The School of Civic Virtue") before it was acquired by Søren Gyldendal in 1783.

No 8, 10, 14 and 16 which also date from the 1730, and No. 18 from 1780 are also listed.

== Cultural references ==
It is in Bo-bi Bar that Alex (Nikolaj Lie Kaas) and Aimee -(Maria Bonnevie) meet each other for the first time in Christoffer Boe's 2003 film Reconstruction.

== See also ==
- Gammel Mønt
- Sværtegade
