= Wivels Forlag =

Publishing house from Denmark

Wivels Forlag was a publishing house operated by Ole Wivel from 1945 to 1954 in Copenhagen, Denmark. It published the literary magazine Heretica.

== History ==
Ole Wivel established Wivels Forlag and experienced his literary breakthrough as a poet with his own I Fiskens Tegn which was published the same year. Wivels Forlag published the conservative literary and cultural magazine Heretica from 1948. The publishing house closed in 1953 and most of the authors followed Wivel to Gyldendal the following year.

== See also ==
- Gads Forlag
