= Izzet Celasin =

Norwegian author of Turkish descent

Izzet Celasin (born 1958 in Istanbul, Turkey) is a Norwegian author of Turkish descent.

He was a left-wing activist, and spent several years in prison after the 1980 military coup in Turkey. After moving to Norway in 1988, as a political refugee, he began writing novels about the leftist revolt in Turkey. His first novel, "Black Sky, Black Sea" was one of the winners of Gyldendal competition for best political novel.

Traducciones. Cielo negro, mar negro. Lengua de Trapo. Madrid, 2010. Traducción de Carmen Freixanet. 423 páginas.
