= Gyldendal House =

Building in Copenhagen, Denmark

- Gyldendals Gård
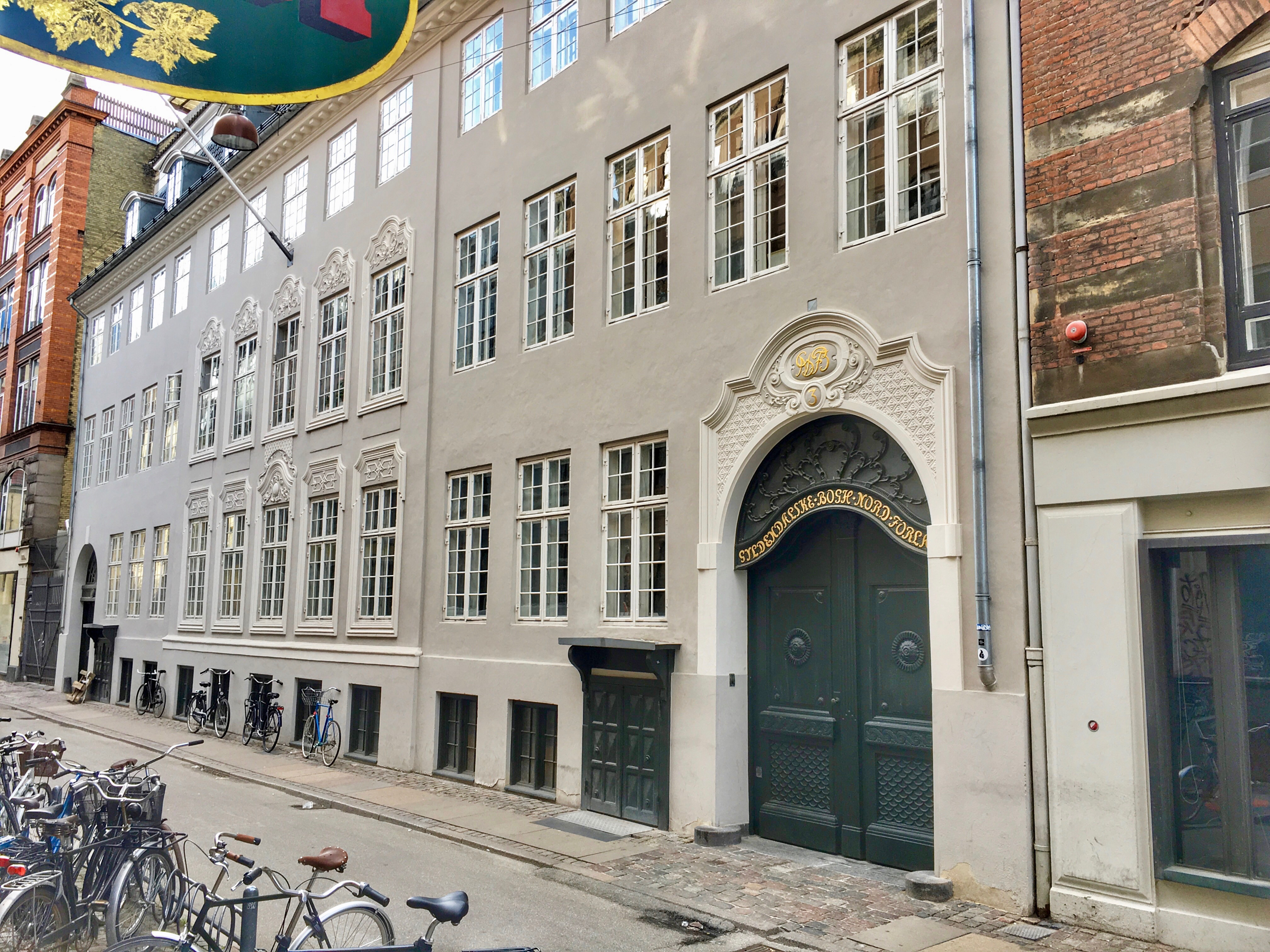
- Interactive map of the Gyldendal House area

General information
- Location: Copenhagen, Denmark
- Coordinates: 55°40′51.46″N 12°34′41.48″E
- Completed: 1730s

The Gyldendal House (Danish: Gyldendals Gård), situated at Klareboderne 3, is the current headquarters of the Gyldendal publishing house in Copenhagen, Denmark. The 15-bays-long Baroque style town mansion was constructed by master mason and stucco artist Abraham Stoy in the 1740s. It was acquired by Gyldendal-founder Søren Gyldendal in 1787, and his publishing house has been headquartered in the building since then. A large new rear wing was constructed in the 1870s. The front wing was listed in the Danish registry of protected buildings and places in 1918.

== History ==
=== 17th and 18th centuries ===
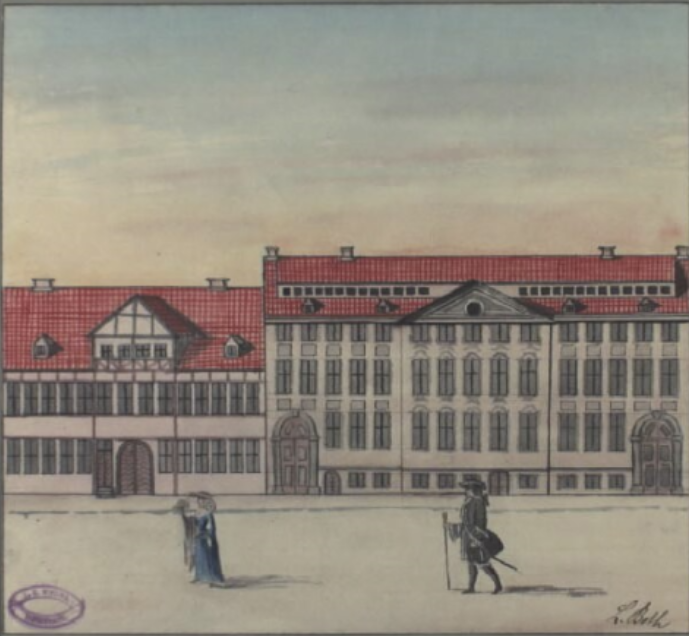
The building seen to the right on a drawing from 1840.

The property on the site was listed as No. 9 in Rosenborg Quarter in Copenhagen's first cadastre of 1689. It was at that time owned by Jørgen Bielke. The buildings on the site were destroyed in the Copenhagen Fire of 1728. The property was sold to master mason and stucco artist Abraham Stoy (c.1697-1734). A section of the property was before or after the transaction transferred to the adjacent No. 10 (No. 17/1756, No. 7/1806). Stoy is, by some sources, mentioned as one of the leading master masons in the city. He had previously worked on Fredensborg Palace. In 1731, he started the construction of a large new building on his property. The building contained two residences, a larger one in the northern part of the building and a somewhat smaller one in its southern part. The latter was by Stoy intended for his use. The new building had not yet been completed at the time of his death in 1734. His widow married one of his former employees, J. C. Böhme (before 1716-1753/1754), who subsequently continued his old employer's business. He completed the building in Klareboderne in 1835.

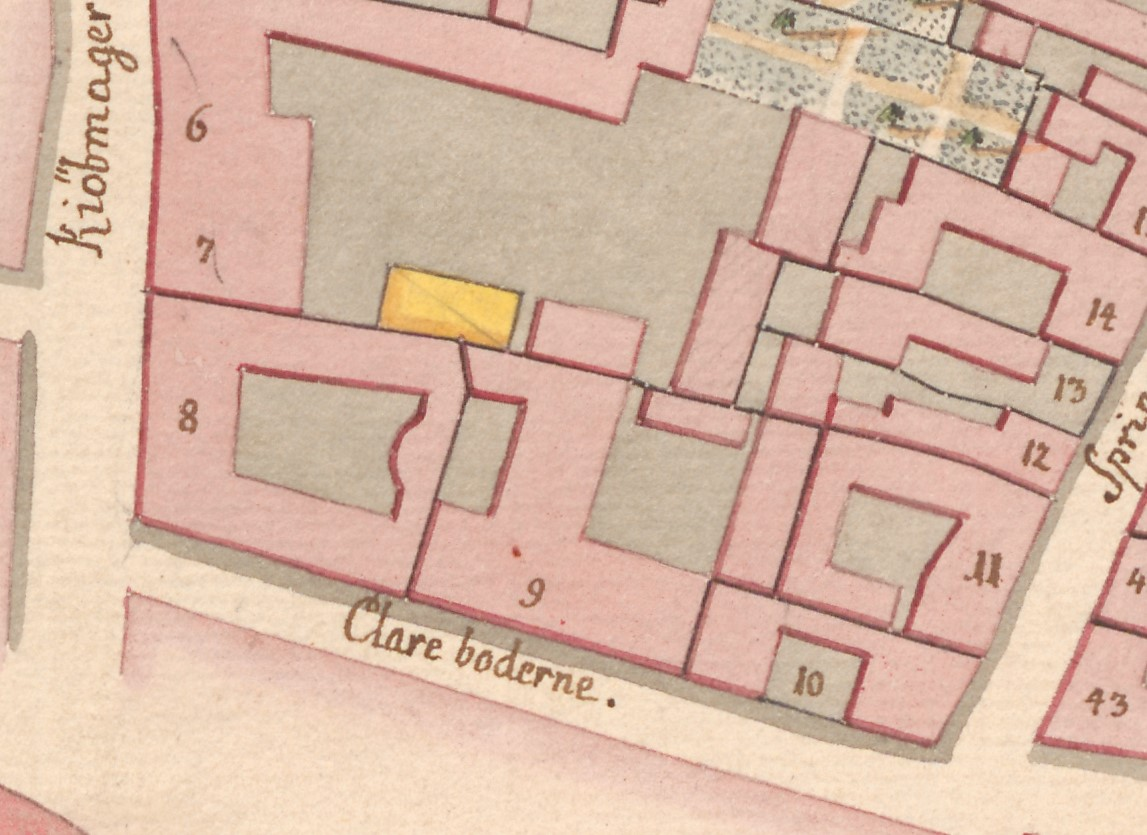
No. 9 seen on a detail from Gedde's map of Klædebo Quarter, 1757,

The property was again listed as No. 9 in the new cadastre of 1756. It was at that time owned by Mogens Scheel von Plessen .

The property was later acquired by Jewish court commissioner Joseph Bernhardt Wessely. The property was home to three households at the time of the 1787 census. Joseph Bernhardt Wessely resided in the building with his second wife Proba Wessely, their son Bernhardt Wessely, two maids. and two lodgers. Niels Poulsen, county manager (amtsforvalter) at Copenhagen County, resided in the building with the clerk Mathias Wilhjelm and one servant. Boel Cathrine, a 68-year-old widow who managed a tavern in the basement, resided in the building with her niece Anne Christine Holt.

=== Søren Gyldendal ===
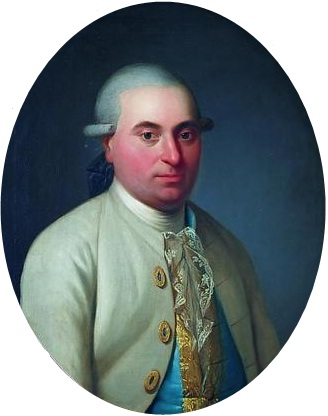
Søren Gyldendal

The property was later in 1787 sold to Søren Gyldendal. His property was home to 42 residents in four households at the 1801 census. Gyldendal resided in the building with his wife Frideriche Kraft, their eight-year-old son Jens Kraft Gyldendahl, his 11-year-old daughter Bolette Cathrine Gyldendahl (by his second wife), his nephew Thomas Møller (a volunteer in the firm), five lodgers, two maids, a coachman and a caretaker. Johan Leiner Arntsen, a club host, resided in the building with his wife Karen Sophie Jacobsen, their four children (aged four to 14), his sister-in-law Kirstine Jacobsen, two male servants, and three maids. Peder Johannes Heide, a game and fruit merchant, resided in the building with his wife Anne Margrethe Sørensdatter, their five children (aged two to 12), three lodgers and one maid. Johan Philip Bistrup, a baker, resided in the building with his wife Jacobine Lovise Hein and their two daughters (aged 18 and 21).

Frederikke Gyldendal kept the property after her husband's death in 1802. Her property was listed as No. 8 in the new cadastre of 1806.

=== Jacob Deichmann ===
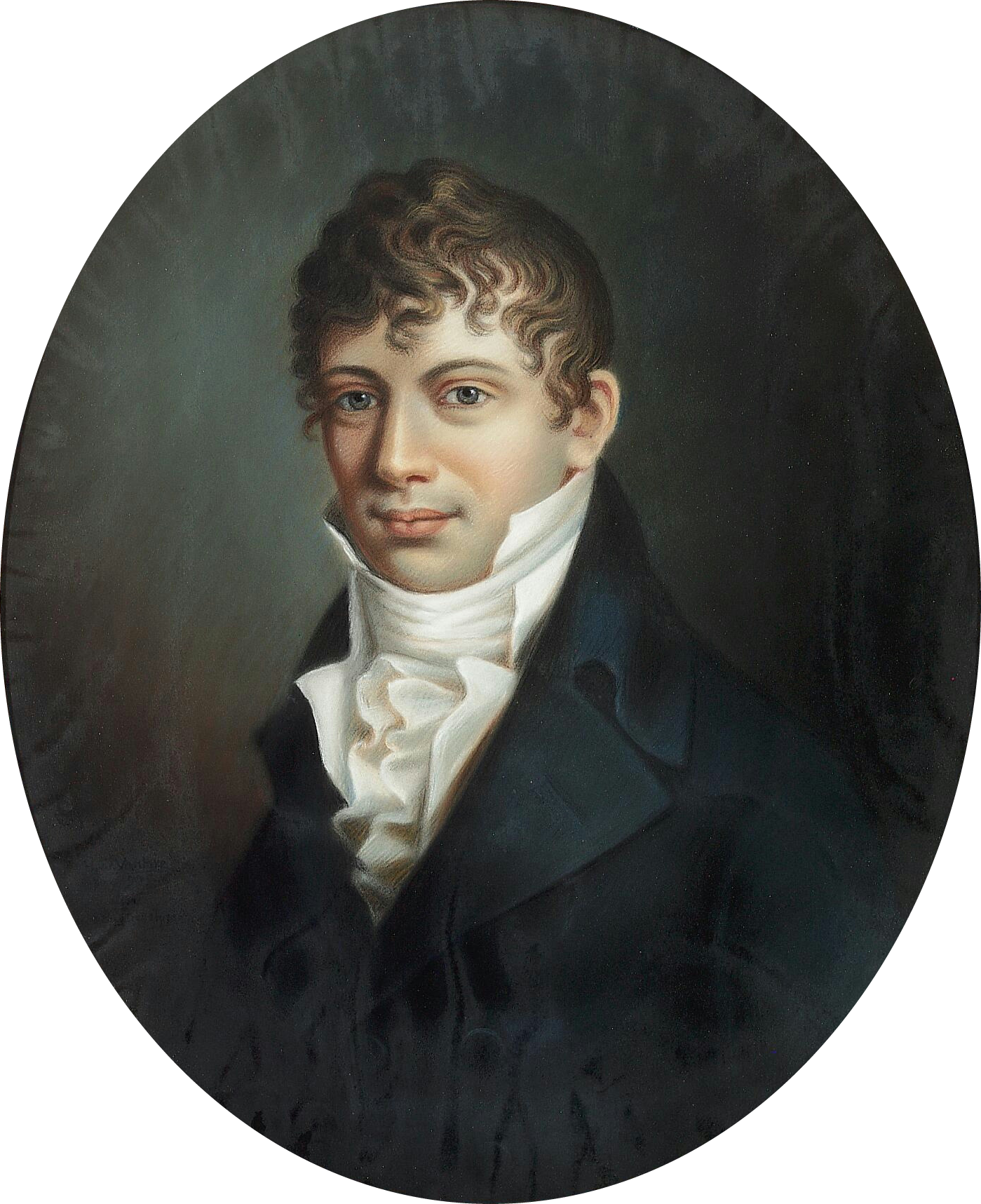
Jacob Deichmann

In 1809 Frederikke Gyldendal ceded the property and associated business to her son-in-law Jacob Deichmann.

In 1813, Borgerdyd School was by Michael Nielsen moved from its old premises in Møntergade two the two upper floors of Deichmann's building. It was based in the building until 1843. Pupils at the school included C. V. Rimestad, Søren Kierkegaard, Orla Lehmann and Carlsberg-founder J. C. Jacobsen.

Christian Molbech (1783-1857), a literary historian, was among the residents of the building from 1814 to 1820.Laurids Engelstoft (1774-1851), a professor of history, was among the residents of the building from 1815 to 1830. Christian Flor an inspector at the Borgerdyd School resided in the building in 1821–22.

Jacob Deichmann's property was home to 50 residents at the time of the 1840 census. Deichmann resided on the ground floor with his wife Bolette Cathrine Kraft (née Gyldendal), his sister Johanne Christine Deichmann, his employees Niels Frederik Wilhelm Healt and Ludvig Christian Floor, two male servants and two maids. Micael Nielsen (1776–1846), a professor and manager of Borgerdyd School, resided on the first floor with his wife Elise Geil, their give children (aged six to 19(, the wife's Johanne Gjerløff, pupil Heinrich Bech, one male servant, two maids and the lodgers Frederik Christian Willemoes (1812-1909), Niels Peter Wilhelm Willemoes (1814-1892) and Carl Joseph Julius Bonfils. Christian Alexis Flensborg, a Hof- og Stadsretten judge, resided in one of the second floor apartments with his wife Christine (née Boserup), their four children (aged one to nine) and two maids. Jacob Christian Hald, secretary of the Royal Danish Agricultural Society, resided in the other second floor apartment with his wife Emilie Beate Hald (née Jacobsen), their four children (aged three to seven) and two maids. Hans Christian Nielsen, a grocer (høker), resided in the basement with his wife Mine Jensen. Jacob Nielsen, a mailman, resided in the basement with his wife Kirstine Nielsen (née Petersen), their five children (aged one to ten) and the 25-year-old woman Helene Levartine Christiane Wieth.

The building was home to 39 residents in 1845. Jacob Christian Hald occupied the entire first floor with his wife, their four children, one house teacher and two maids. Christian Alexis Flensborg occupied the entire second floor with his wife, their five children and two maids. Hans Jensen Thostrup, an innkeeper, resided in the basement with his wife Anna Mathilde Riise and their two daughters (aged 12 and 15).

=== Frederik Wilhelm Hegel ===
The company was ceded to Frederik Vilhelm Hegel (1817-1887) in 1846–50. Om the 1860s and 1870s, Gyldendal developed into the leading publisher of books on Denmark and Norway. The company headquarters in Klareboderne was expanded in 1875. He lived in the apartment on the first floor. In 1880, he purchased Gammel Skovgaard in Ordrup.

The property was home to 43 residents at the time of the 1880 census. Frederik Vilhelm Hegel resided on the first floor with his son Jacob Deichmann Frederik Hegel. his daughter-in-law Julie Frederikke Louise Hegel, (née Bagge), their two daughters (aged one and four), one male servant and two maids. Julius Goldschmith, a shipping broker, resided on the ground floor with his wife Caroline Marie Goldschmith, their five children (aged 12 to 25), one male servant and three maidfs. Frantz Johan Gerhardt Bøving, a book dealer, resided in one of the second floor apartments with his wife Vilhelmine ?? Bøving (née Knudsen), three of their children and one maid. Christine Brygmann Flensborg (née Boserup), widow of a judge, resided on the second floor with her Eva Christiane Flensborg, her son Julius Vilhelm Flensborg and two maids. Peter Petersen, an innkeeper, resided in the basement with his wife Ellen Petersen and three of their children (aged 18 to 21). Peter Andersen Freiler, a beer seller, resided in the other basement apartment with his wife Cathrine Charlotte, their three children (aged one to three), two male servants and one maid.

=== Later history ===
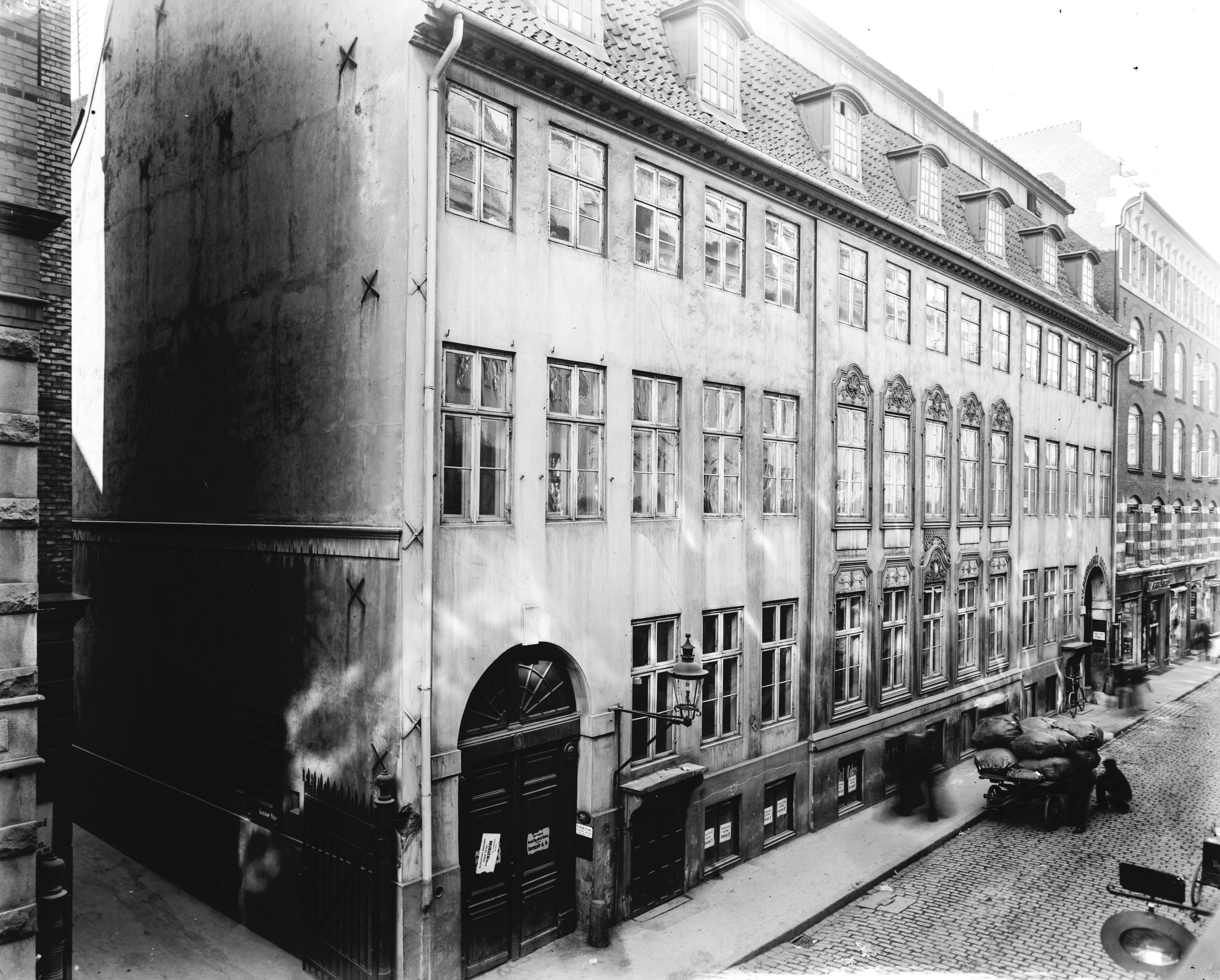
The building photographed by Frederik Riise.

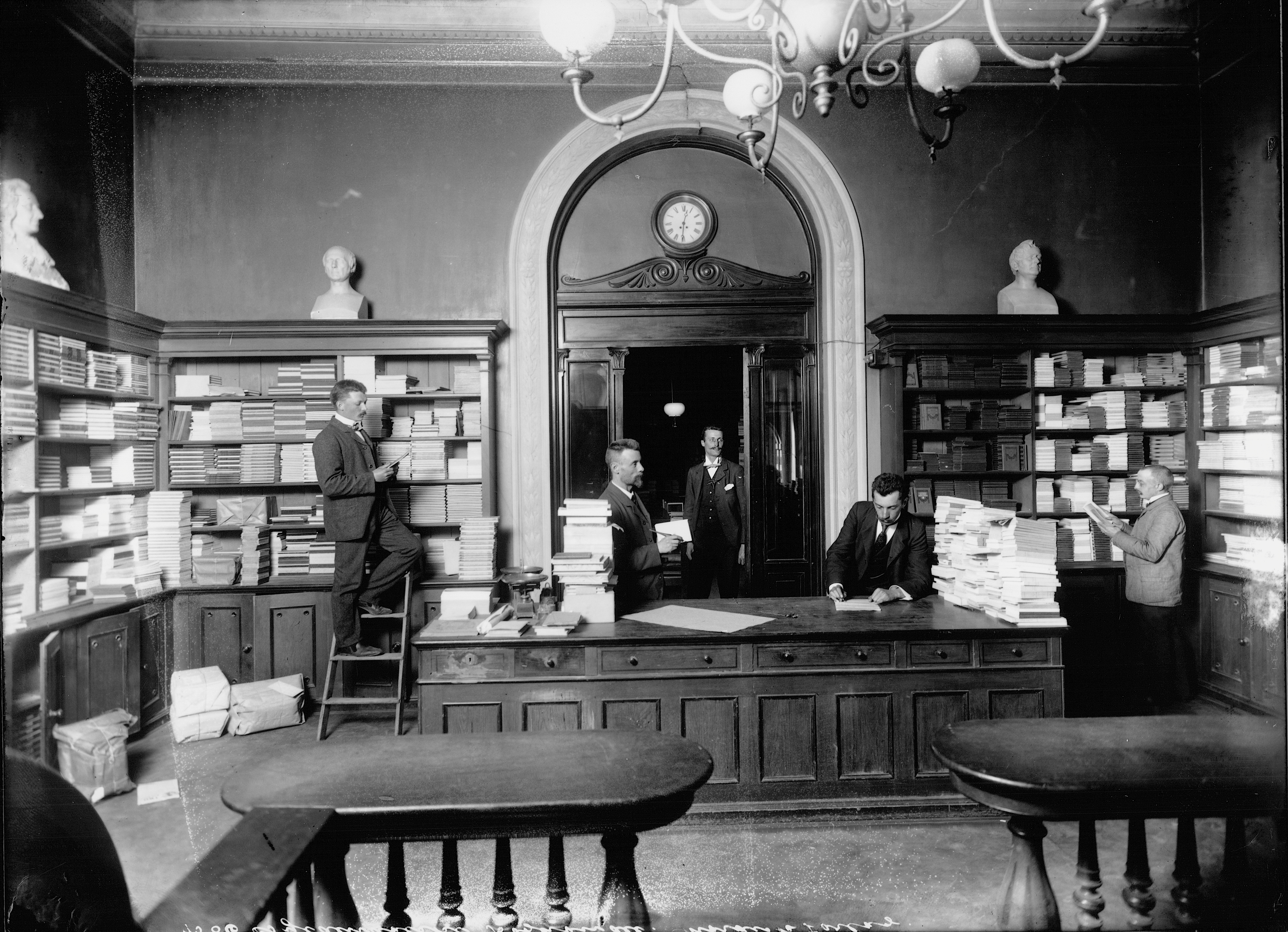
The interior of the bookshop photographed by Peter Elfelt in 1904.

Frederik W. Hegel made his son Jacob Hegel (1851-) a partner of the company in 1877.Jacob Hegel continued the company alone following his father's death in 1887.

In 1896, Gyldendal purchased C. A. Reitzel, In 1901, it also purchased Det jydske Forlag (founded 1892). In 1903, Gyldendal merged with Det Nordiske Forlag under the name Den Gyldendalske Boghandel, Nordisk Forlag with August Bagge, Ernst Bojesen and Peter Nansen as management. A large new combined administration building and warehouse was inaugurated the same year at Lindgreen Allé 12 on Amager. The new building was designed by architect Ludvig Andersen. The management of the firm remained in the old building on Klareboderne.

Jacob Hegel moved out of the apartment in Klareboderne but kept Skovgaard after his father's death. The building in Klareboderne was only home to a single household in 1907, consisting of concierge Niels Christian Hansen, his wife Oline Hansen and their eight-year-old son Ove Laurits Hansen.

Jacob Hegel died in 1918 and us buried in Ordrup Cemetery. His son Frederik Hegel Jr. was managing director of Gyldendal from 1912 until 1939. In 1914–15. Hegel constructed his own summer residence in Springforbi with the assistance of the architect Henning Hansen. Hegel, whose wife was English/Irish, named it "Tipperary". The house was conveniently located close to Copenhagen Golf Club's's new golf course at Jægersborg Dyrehave. Hegel had been an enthusiastic member of the golf club since its foundation in 1898 and won his first Danish championship in 1911.

== Architecture ==
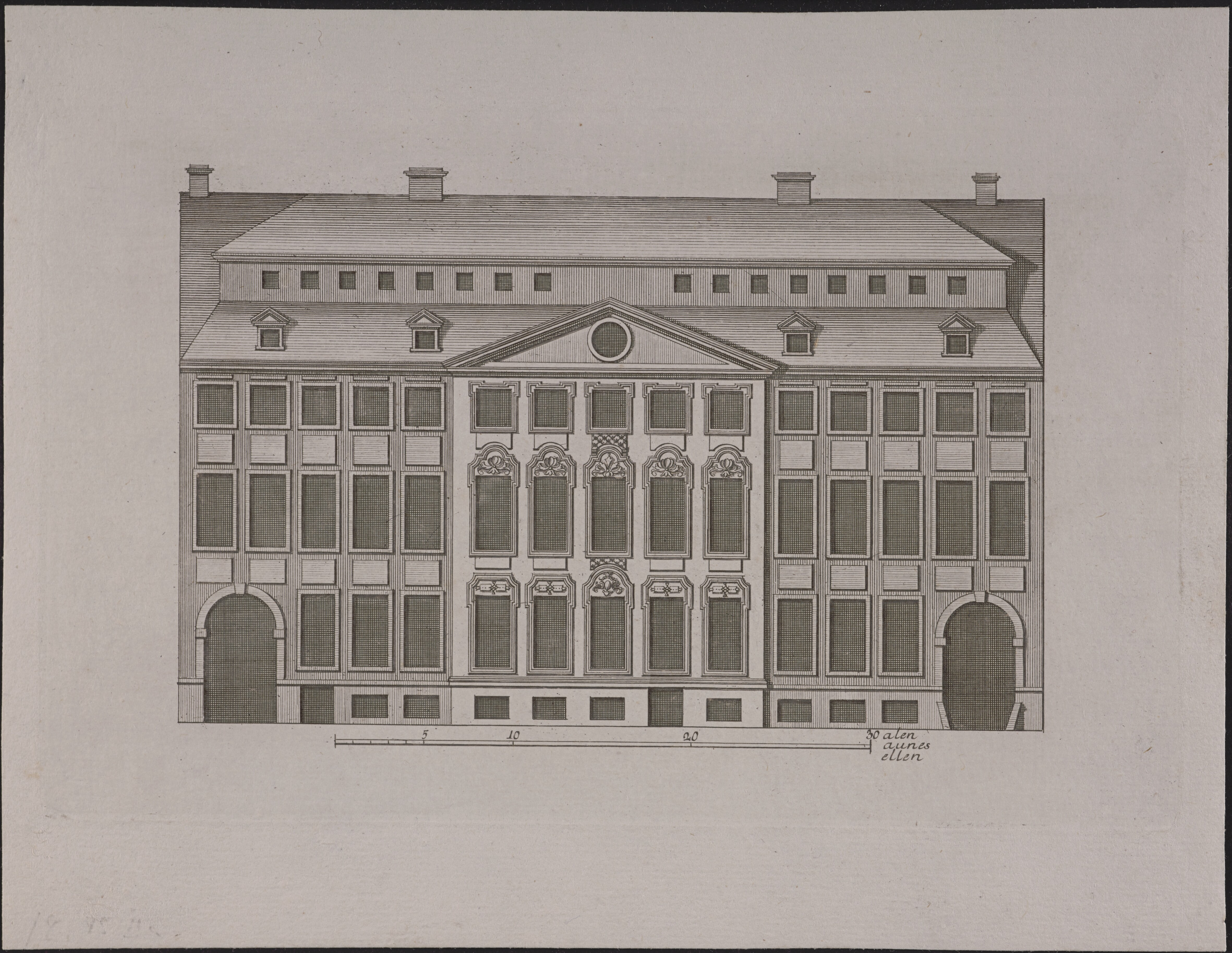
A drawing of the original facade design.

Klareboderne 3 is constructed with three storeys over a walk-out basement and is 15 bays wide. The slightly projecting (with jalf a brick) five bays wide median risalit is decorated with stucco ornamentation around the windows. A gateway is located in each of the outer bays. The one on the southernmost bay was redesigned by in 1800s, accentuating its status as the principal entrance of the complex. Two basement entrances are located in the bays next to the gateways. The Mansard roof features seven dromer windows towards the street and five dormer windows towards the yard. The roof ridge is pierced by a single chimney.

== Today ==
Gyldendal is still based in the building. The garret has been converted into a canteen. The courtyard is frequently used for events.
