= Hans Reitzels Forlag =

Danish publishing house

- Industry: Publishing
- Founded: 1949
- Founder: Hans Reitzel
- Headquarters: Copenhagen, Denmark
- Parent: Gyldendal
- Website: hansreitzel.dk

Hans Reitzels Forlag, founded in 1949, is a Danish publishing house that publishes fiction and textbooks in psychology, social work, education, social sciences, humanities, economics, law, communication and organization and direction subjects.

It is part of the Gyldendal publishing group based in Copenhagen, Denmark.
