= Gjellerups Forlag =

Publishing house and bookshop in Copenhagen, Denmark

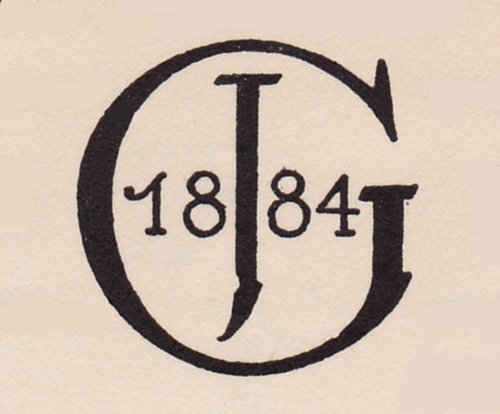
- Industry: Publishing
- Founded: 1884
- Founder: Julius Gjellerup
- Defunct: 1984
- Headquarters: Copenhagen, Denmark

Gjellerups Forlag, originally Jul. Gjellerups Forlag, was a publishing house and bookshop located in Copenhagen, Denmark. Gjellerups Forlag is no longer operated as an independent subsidiary but the name Gjellerup survives as a brand for publication of textbooks for law students and other legal literature.

== History ==
Jul. Gjellerups Forlag was founded on 15 March 1883 when 25-year-old Julius Gjellerup (1858-1917) opened a combined publishing house and bookshop on the square Sølvtorvet in the new district that was emerging after the decommissioning of Copenhagen's fortifications. Early publications of fiction included Dansk Folkebibliotek, a series of translations of international classics for 25 øre published in collaboration with P. Hauberg & Co, as well as works by new Danish writers such as Martin Andersen Nexø and Johan Skjoldborg.

With the opening in 1900 of the new Polytechnical College on the other side of the square, Gjellerup began to specialize in technical textbooks and other scientific literature. In 1903, his fictional portfolio was sold to E. Jespersens Forlag and from then on the publishing hose focused exclusively on school books and other nonfiction.

Gjellerup's widow Anine Gjellerup (1862-1943) took on the company after his sudden death on 6 June 1917, assisted by Harald Jensen as manager of the publishing house and Jens Peter Olsen as manager of the bookshop. In 1935 Harald Jensen took on the position as CEI of the company as well as of Nordisk Atlasfabrik. With Anine Gjellerup's death on 30 June 1943, ownership of the company passed to the daughters Karen Hartmann-Bornebusch and Inger Gjellerup Andersen. The company relocated to Rømersgade 11 in 1960. On 1 April 1972, the company was converted into a limited company (aktieselskab) with P.E. Bjørrild as new CEO. In 1974 the company was converted into an anpartsselskab (Aps).

The company was acquired by G.E.C. Gad on 1 April 1984. The bookshop is merged into Harcks Boghandel at the corner of Fiolstræde and Nørre Voldgade, which has been renamed to Hack og Gjellerup.

Gjellerups Forlag and Gads Forlag co-founded Gad & Gjellerup, a publisher of school books that later merged with Aschehoug's school book activities under the name Alinea.

== Today ==
Gjellerups Forlag is no longer operated as an independent subsidiary but the name Gjellerup survives as a brand for publication of textbooks for law students and other legal literature.
