= Søren Gyldendal =

Danish bookstore owner (1742–1802)

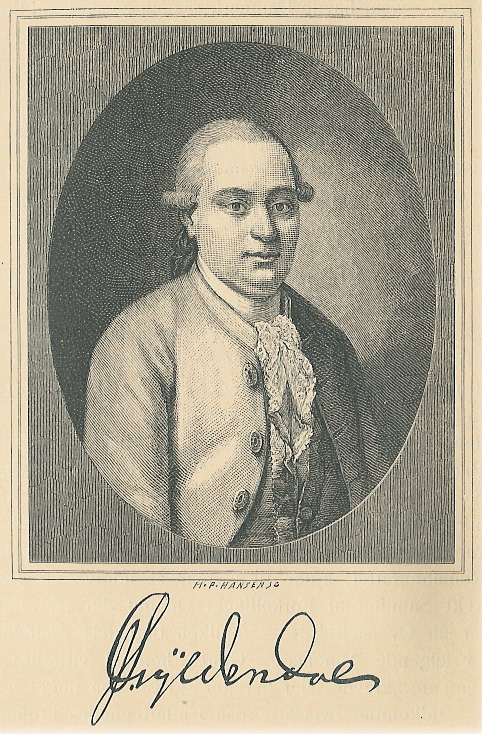
- Born: 12 April 1742
- Died: 8 February 1802 (aged 59)

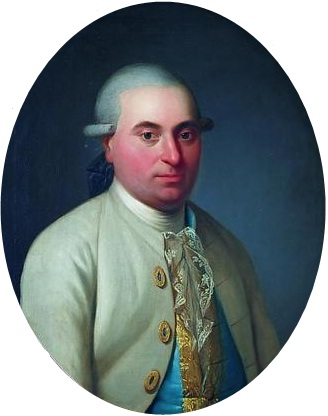
Portrait of Søren Gyldendal

Søren Gyldendal (12 April 1742 – 8 February 1802) was a Danish bookstore owner who founded Gyldendal which became Denmark's largest publishing house.

== Biography ==
Søren Jensen Gyldendal was born at Aars in Vesthimmerland, Denmark. Gyldendal attended Aarhus Katedralskole, graduated from the University of Copenhagen in 1766 and took the examen philosophicum the following year. He acquired a bookstore and in 1770 he began his independent publishing house.

Every year on the anniversary of his birthday, the Søren Gyldendal Foundation (Søren Gyldendal Fonden) awards a prize in his name, the Søren Gyldendal Prize (Søren Gyldendal Prisen). Since 2009, the prize has been DKK 200,000. Every second year a fiction writer is awarded and every second year the prize goes to a non-fiction author.
