= Gyldendal =

Danish publishing house

- Company type: Public
- Traded as: Nasdaq Copenhagen: GYLD A, GYLD B
- Industry: Publishing
- Founded: 1770
- Founder: Søren Gyldendal
- Headquarters: Copenhagen, Denmark
- Key people: Morten Hesseldahl (CEO); Poul Erik Tøjner (Chairman)
- Products: Books
- Revenue: Net 863 million DKK (2017)
- Operating income: 44,8 million DKK (2017)
- Number of employees: 448 (as of 2017)
- Subsidiaries: Rosinante & Co. A/S; Publizon A/S; EyeJustRead; Forlaget Systime A/S
- Website: www.gyldendal.dk

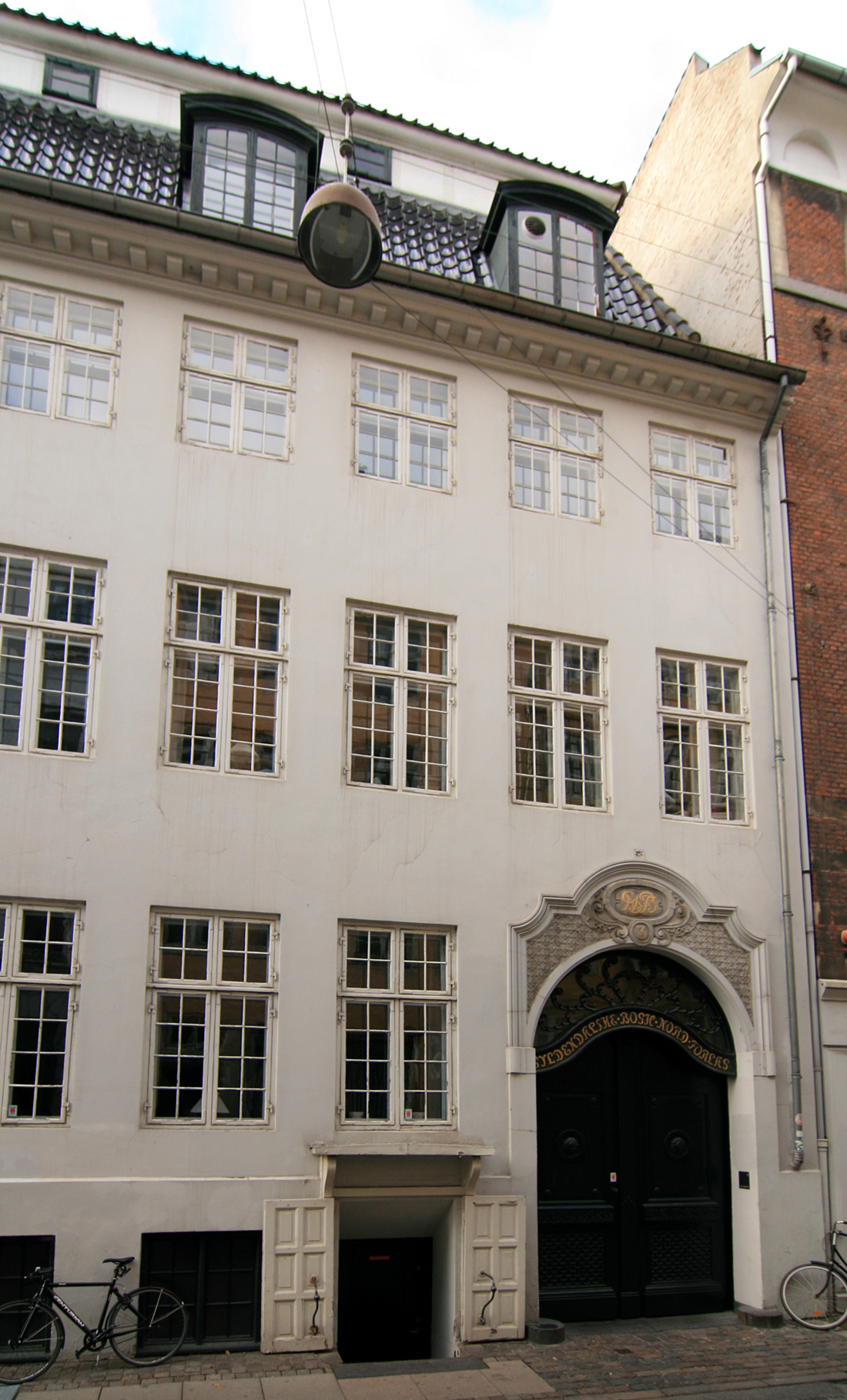
Gyldendal Publishing House, Klareboderne 3, in Copenhagen.

Gyldendalske Boghandel, Nordisk Forlag A/S, usually referred to simply as Gyldendal (Danish pronunciation: [ˈkylˀn̩ˌtɛˀl]), is a Danish publishing house.

Founded in 1770 by Søren Gyldendal, it is the oldest and largest publishing house in Denmark, offering a wide selection of books including fiction, non-fiction and dictionaries. Prior to 1925, it was also the leading publishing house in Norway, and it published all of Henrik Ibsen's works. In 1925, a Norwegian publishing house named Gyldendal Norsk Forlag ("Gyldendal Norwegian Publishing House") was founded, having bought rights to Norwegian authors from Gyldendal.

Gyldendal is a public company and its shares are traded on the Copenhagen Stock Exchange (Nasdaq Copenhagen: GYLD A, GYLD B).

Gyldendal stopped the print version of their encyclopedia in 2006, focusing instead on selling paid subscriptions for its online encyclopedia, Den Store Danske Encyklopædi. By 2008 it had decided that it needed another approach to support that online site. In February 2009 Gyldendal began publishing the encyclopedia online using a subscription-free advertising model. In 2017 the online encyclopedia was closed and in 2020 its contents were included in Lex, another online encyclopedia.

== Subsidiaries ==
Subsidiaries include:

- Rosinante
- Høst & Søn
- Samlerens Forlag
- Forlaget Forum
- Forlaget Fremad
- Hans Reitzels Forlag
- Munksgaard
- Academica
- Systime
- Exlibris
- Gyldendals Bogklubber

== See also ==
- Wivels Forlag
