= List of streets in Copenhagen =

This list of streets in Copenhagen lists streets in Copenhagen, Denmark.

== City centre ==
Name	Image	Coordinates	Length	Landmarks	Refs
Åbenrå		55°40′58.8″N 12°34′37.2″E	223 m	Danish Association of Architects	Ref
Adelgade		55°41′6.72″N 12°35′4.92″E	345 m	Danish Association of Architects	Ref
Admiralgade		55°41′6″N 12°35′39″E	170 m		Ref
Amagertorv		55°40′42.96″N 12°34′38.64″E			Ref
Amaliegade		55°40′42.96″N 12°34′38.64″E	780 m	Amalienborg, Classen Library	Ref
Amalienborg Slotsplads					Ref
Antonigade		55°40′49.08″N 12°34′53.04″E			Ref
Asylgade		55°40′42″N 12°35′1.92″E			Ref
August Bournonvilles Passage				Brønnum House, Stærekassen	Ref
Badstuestræde		55°40′41.16″N 12°34′31.08″E			Ref
Bispetorv		55°40′45.12″N 12°34′18.12″E		Reformation Memorial	Ref
Boldhusgade		55°40′38.3″N 12°34′54.6″E			Ref
Borgergade		55°41′2.69″N 12°35′7.42″E			Ref
Børsgade				Børsen	Ref
Bredgade		55°41′6.72″N 12°35′18.6″E		Danish Museum of Art and Design	Ref
Bremerholm		55°40′44″N 12°34′58.5″E			Ref
Brolæggerstræde		55°40′39.36″N 12°34′28.92″E			Ref
Bryghusgade					Ref
Christian IX's Gade		55°49′55.56″N 12°34′51.24″E			Ref
Cort Adelers Gade					Ref
Delfingade					Ref
Dronningens Tværgade		55°41′24″N 12°35′9.24″E			Ref
Dybensgade					Ref
Dyrkøb		55°40′44.76″N 12°34′22.08″E		Kunstnerkollegiet	Ref
Esplanaden		55°41′16″N 12°35′41″E			Ref
Farvergade					Ref
Fiolstræde		55°40′53″N 12°34′21″E			Ref
Fredericiagade		55°41′10.57″N 12°35′19.1″E			Ref
Frederiksborggade		55°41′5.28″N 12°34′6.24″E			Ref
Gammel Mønt		55°40′53″N 12°34′50″E			Ref
Gammel Strand		55°40′39″N 12°34′41.16″E		Kunstforeningen	Ref
Gammeltorv		55°40′41″N 12°34′20″E		Stelling House, Suhr House	Ref
Gammelvagt					Ref
Gernersgade		55°41′17.88″N 12°35′12.3″E			Ref
Grønnegade		55°40′51.96″N 12°34′58.08″E			Ref
Hammerensgade					Ref
Haregade					Ref
Havnegade		55°40′38″N 12°35′26″E			Ref
Højbro Plads		55°40′42″N 12°34′48″E			Ref
Holmens Kanal		55°40′40.08″N 12°35′8.88″E		Erichsen Mansion, Peschier House	Ref
Hyskenstræde		55°41′41.94″N 12°34′35.05″E			Ref
Kastellet					Ref
Kattesundet					Ref
Kejsergade					Ref
Klareboderne		55°40′51.6″N 12°34′42.24″E			Ref
Klerkegade		55°41′11.4″N 12°35′6.36″E			Ref
Klosterstræde		55°40′45.12″N 12°34′31.44″E			Ref
Knabrostræde		55°40′38.64″N 12°34′30.36″E			Ref
Kompagnistræde					Ref
Kongens Nytorv		55°40′49″N 12°34′9″E		Erichsen Mansion, Peschier House	Ref
Kristen Bernikows Gade		55°40′49.44″N 12°34′55.2″E			Ref
Krokodillegade					Ref
Kronprinsensgade		55°40′50.52″N 12°34′45.48″E			Ref
Kronprinsessegade		55°41′11″N 12°35′2″E			Ref
Krusemyntegade					Ref
Krystalgade		55°40′51.24″N 12°34′24.96″E		Copenhagen Central Library, Great Synagogue	Ref
Kultorvet		55°40′57″N 12°34′26.76″E			Ref
Kvæsthusgade					Ref
Købmagergade		55°40′50.88″N 12°34′38.28″E		Round Tower	Ref
Laksegade		55°40′42″N 12°35′1.92″E		Danish Association of Architects	Ref
Landemærket		55°40′42″N 12°35′1.92″E		Danish Association of Architects	Ref
Landgreven		55°40′58.98″N 12°35′8.39″E			Ref
Larsbjørnsstræde		55°40′42.14″N 12°34′9.99″E			Ref
Larslejsstræde					Ref
Lavendelstræde					Ref
Lille Kannikestræde					Ref
Lille Kirkestræde					Ref
Lille Kongensgade		55°40′46″N 12°35′0″E			Ref
Lille Strandstræde					Ref
Læderstræde				Ref	
Løngangstræde					Ref
Lønporten					Ref
Løvstræde					Ref
Magstræde					Ref
Mikkel Bryggers Gade					Ref
Møntergade					Ref
Naboløs		55°40′39″N 12°34′37.5″E			Ref
Niels Hemmingsens Gade		55°40′46.56″N 12°34′37.92″E			Ref
Niels Juels Gade					Ref
Nikolaj Plads					Ref
Nikolajgade					Ref
Nordre Toldbod					Ref
Ny Adelgade					Ref
Ny Kongensgade					Ref
Ny Vestergade					Ref
Ny Østergade					Ref
Nybrogade					Ref
Nygade					Ref
Nyhavn		55°40′47″N 12°35′26″E			Ref
Nytorv		55°40′39.36″N 12°34′22.8″E			Ref
Nørre Voldgade					Ref
Nørregade					Ref
Olfert Fischers Gade					Ref
Palægade		55°40′54.84″N 12°35′13.56″E			Ref
Peder Hvitfeldts Stræde		55°40′54.46″N 12°34′26.95″E			Ref
Peder Skrams Gade					Ref
Pilestræde		55°40′53.04″N 12°34′43.68″E			Ref
Rådhusstræde					Ref
Rævegade					Ref
Rigensgade		55°41′17.88″N 12°35′0.6″E			Ref
Rosenborggade					Ref
Rosengade					Ref
Rosengården					Ref
Sankt Annæ Plads					Ref
Sankt Gertruds Stræde					Ref
Sankt Pauls Gade					Ref
Sankt Pauls Plads					Ref
Sankt Peders Stræde					Ref
Sankt Petri Passage					Ref
Silkegade		55°40′47.8″N 12°34′47.86″E			Ref
Sjæleboderne					Ref
Skindergade					Ref
Skoubogade					Ref
Slotsholmsgade					Ref
Sølvgade				Sølvgade Barracks, Sølcgade School, Jacob Holmblad House	Ref
Stockholmsgade					
Stokhusgade					
Store Kannikestræde					Ref
Store Kongensgade					Ref
Store Strandstræde			Waagepetersen House	Ref	
Stormgade					Ref
Studiestræde					Ref
Suensonsgade					Ref
Toldbodgade					Ref
Tøjhusgade					Ref
Tornebuskegade					Ref
Valkendorfsgade					Ref
Vandkunsten					Ref
Ved Kongeporten					Ref
Ved Stranden					Ref
Vestergade					Ref
Vognmagergade					Ref

=== Christianshavn ===
Name	Image	Coordinates	Landmarks	Landmarks	Reference	
A. H. Vedels Plads					Ref	
Anagergade					Ref	
Andreas Bjørns Gade					Ref	
Applebys Plads					Ref	
Arsenalvej					Ref	
Asiatisk Plads					Ref	
Bådsmandsstræde					Ref	
Bodenhoffs Plads					Ref	
Bohlendachvej					Ref	
Brobergsgade					Ref	
Burmeistergade						Ref
Christianshavns Kanal						Ref
Christianshavns Torv						Ref
Christianshavns Voldgade						Ref
Danneskiold-Samsøes Allé						Ref
David Balfours Gadel						Ref
Dronningensgadel						Ref
Ekvipagemestervej						Ref
Ekvipagemestervej						Ref
Eskadrevej						Ref
Fabriksmester						Ref
Galionsvej						Ref
H. C. Sneedorffs Allé						Ref
Halvtolv						Ref
Hammerhøjs Kaj						Ref
Henrik Gerners Plads						Ref
Henrik Spans Vej						Ref
Johan Semps Gade						Ref
Kanonbådsvej						Ref
Kongebrosvej						Ref
Langebrogade					Ref	
Overgaden Oven Vandet						
Sankt Annæ Gade		55°40′28.92″N 12°35′26.88″E			Church of Our Saviour	Ref
Sofiegade						Ref
Spanteloftvej						Ref
Store Søndervoldstræde						
Strandgade		55°40′28.92″N 12°35′26.88″E				Ref
Takkeladsvej						Ref
Torvegade						Ref
Theodor Christensens Plads						Ref
Ved Sixtusbatteriet						Ref
Ved Søminegraven						Ref
Wilders Plads						Ref
Wildersgade						Ref

== Amager ==
Name	Image	Coordinates	Length	Landmarks	Reference
Ahrenkildes Allé					
Amager Boulevard		55°41′6″N 12°34′10.08″E			
Amager Strand vej					
Amagerbrogade		55°39′2″N 36°36′44″E			
Amagerfælledvek					
Arne Jacobsens Allé					
Artillerivej					
Blekingegade					
Christmas Møllers Plads					
Egilsgade					
Frankrigsgade					
Holmbladsgade					
Islands Brygge					
Jemtelandsgade					
Myggenæsgade					
Njalsgade					
Øresundsvej					
Østrigsgade					
Oxford Allé					
Prags Boulevard					
Raffinaderivej					
Reykjaviksgade					
Strandlodsvej					
Sundbyvester Plads					

== Frederiksberg ==
Name	Image	Coordinates	Length	Landmarks	Reference
Åboulevard					
Alhambravej					
Allégade		55°40′35.04″N 12°31′57.72″E			
Amalievej					
Amicisvej					
Ane Katrines Vej					
Bakkegårds Allé					
Bille Brahes Vej					
Brøndsteds Allé					
Bülowsvej		55°40′53.4″N 12°32′39.12″E			
Dalgas Boulevard		55°40′59.93″N 12°30′43.26″E			
Danasvej					
Doktor Abildgaards Allé					
Dr. Priemes Vej					
Erik Menveds Vej					
Energiens Torv					
Engtoftevej					
Falkoner Allé		55°40′55.28″N 12°32′5.51″E			
Falkonergårdsvej					
Fillipavej					
Finsensvej					
Forchhammersvej					
Forhåbningsholms Allé					
Franckesvej					
Frederiksberg Allé					
Frederiksberg Bredegade					
Frederiksberg Runddel					
Gammel Kongevej					
Godthåbsvej		55°41′16.44″N 12°31′39.72″E			
Grundtvigsvej					
H. C. Ørsteds Vej					
Halls Allé					
Harsdorffsvej					
Hauchsvej					
Haveselskabetsvej					
Henrik Ibsens Vej					
Henrik Steffens Vej					
Hospitalsvej					
Hostrups Have					
Hostrupsvej					
Howitzvej					
Johnstrups Allé					
Julius Thomsens Plads					
Kammasvej					
Kingosgade					
L. I. Brandes Allé					
Lykkesholms Allé					
Madvigs Allé					
Mariendalsvej		55°41′27.6″N 12°31′54.48″E			
Martensens Allé					
Martinsvej				St. Martin's Church	
Mynstersvej					
Niels Ebbesens Vej					
Nordre Fasanvej					
Prinsesse Maries Allé					
Rolighedsvej		55°41′04.5″N 12°32′30.7″E			
Rosenørns Allé		55°40′55.85″N 12°33′6.05″E			
Sankt Knuds Vej		55°40′37.45″N 12°32′57.34″E			
Sankt Markus Allé					
Schønbergsgade					

== Nørrebro ==
Name	Image	Coordinates	Length	Landmarks	Reference
Åboulevard					
Blågårds Plads					
Blågårdsgade					
Borups Allé					
Ewaldsgade					
Fælledvej					
Griffenfeldsgade					
Guldbergsgade					
Heinesgade					
Jægersborggade					
Jagtvej					
Laurids Skaus Gade					
Kapelvej					
Møllegade					
Nørre Allé					
Nørrebrogade					
Rantzausgade					
Ravnsborggade				Nørrebros Teater	
Rosenørns Allé					
Ryesgade					
Ryesgade					
Sortedam Dossering					
Skotterupgade					
Stefansgade					

== Østerbro ==
Name	Image	Coordinates	Length	Connecting streets	Landmarks	Reference
Århusgade		55°42′23.76″N 12°35′6″E				
Bergensgade						
Blegdamsvej		55°41′48″N 12°34′18″E				
Bogensegade						
Carl Johans Gade						
Classensgade						
Gammel Kalkbrænderi Vej						
Gunnar Nu Hansens Plads						
Gustav Adolfs Gad						
Holsteinsgade						
Helsingborggade						
Hornemansgade						
Indiakaj		55°41′43.08″N 12°34′47.76″E				
Jacob Erlandsens Gade						
Jagtvej						
Kastelsvej						
Kildevældsgade						
Koldinggade						
Kristianiagade				Dag Hammerskjölds Allé, St5randboulevarden	Domus Medica, G. A. Hagemanns Kollegium	
Løgstørgade						
Niels W. Gades Gade						
Nordre Frihavnsgade		55°42′7.56″N 12°35′0.24″E				
Østbanegade		55°42′6.48″N 12°35′28.32″E		Oslo Plads, Århusgade	Glacisgården	
Odensegade						
Øster Allé		55°42′5.4″N 12°34′19.2″E				
Østerbrogade						
Præstøgade						
Randersgade		55°41′18.36″N 12°34′50.88″E				
Rosenvængets Allé						
Ryesgade						
Sankt Jakobs Plads						
Sortedam Dossering						
Slagelsegade						
Strandboulevarden						
Trianglen						
Trondhjemsgade						
Vestagervej						
Vesterled						
Viborggade						
Victor Borges Plads						
Vordingborggade						
Weysesgade						
Willemoesgade						

== Valby ==
Name	Image	Coordinates	Length	Connecting streets	Landmarks	Reference
Bjerregårdsvej						
Carl Jacobsens Vej						
Toftegårds Plads						

== Vesterbro/Kongens Enghave ==
Name	Image	Coordinates	Length	Connecting streets	Landmarks	Reference
Abel Cathrines Gade						
Absalonsgade						
Amerikavej						
Asger Rygs Gade						
Bagerstræde						
Bernstorffsgade						
Brorsonsgade						
Colbjørnsensgade						
Dannebrogsgade						
Dybølsgade						
Enghave Plads						
Enghavevej						
FlensborggadeGade						
Gasværksvej						
HaderslevgadeCathrines Gade						
Ingerslevsgade						
Istedgade						
Istedgade						
Kaalundsgade						
Matthæusgade						
Mysundegade						
Ny Carlsberg Vej						
Oehlenschlægersgade						
Kalvebod Brygge						
Saxogade						
Skydebanegade						
Stenosgade						
Sønder Boulevard						
Staldgade						
Tullinsgade						
Værnedamsvej						
Valdemarsgade						
Vesterfælledvej						
Vesterbrogade						
Vesterbros Torv						
Viktoriagade						
Westend						
