= Ny Adelgade 9 =

Listed building in Copenhagen

Ny Adelggade 9
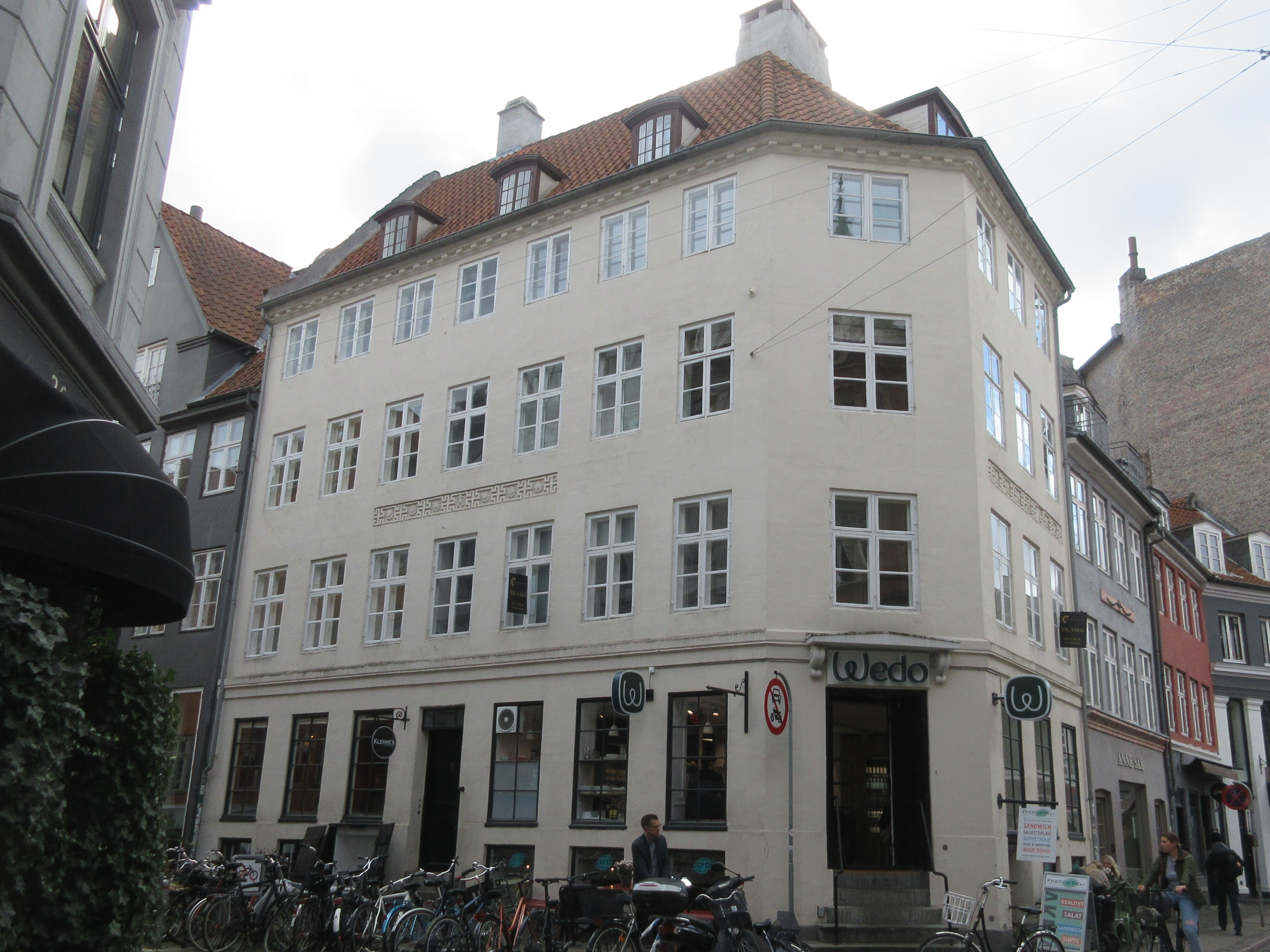

General information
- Location: Copenhagen. Denmark, Denmark
- Coordinates: 55°40′53″N 12°35′00″E
- Completed: 1802–03

Ny Adelgade 9/Grønnegade 32 is a Neoclassical building situated at the corner of Ny Adelgade and Grønnegade in the Old Town of Copenhagen, Denmark. The building was listed in the Danish registry of protected buildings and places in 1982.

== History ==
=== 18th century ===
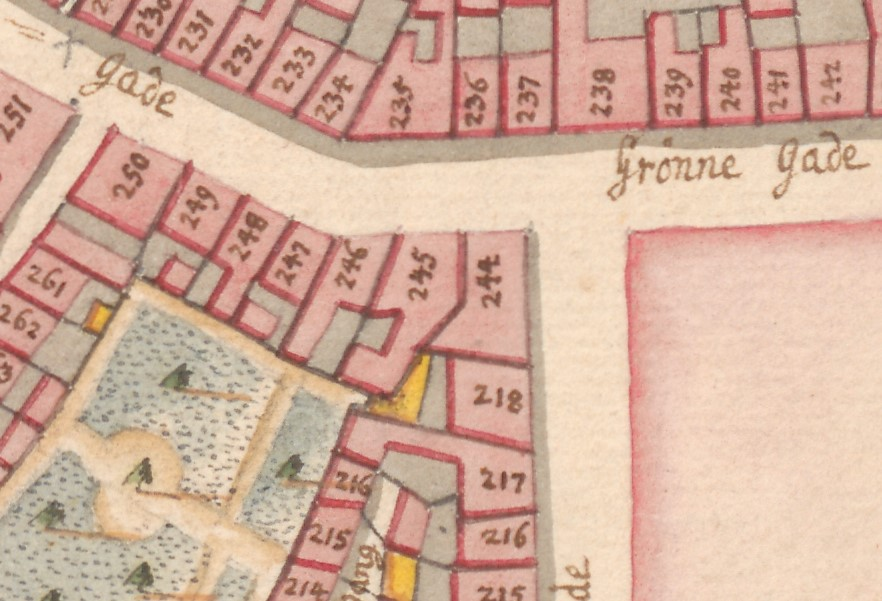
No. 244 seen on a detail from Christian Gedde's map of St. Ann's West Quarter, 1757.

The property was listed in Copenhagen's first cadastre of 1689 as No. 198 in Købmager Quarter and was owned by grocer (hørkræmmer) Richart Winken at that time. It was listed in the new cadastre of 1756 as No. 244 in Købmager Quarter and was owned by Hans Hansen Gasse at that time.

The property was home to 16 residents in five households at the 1787 census. Henning Andreas Berg, a tea merchant, resided in the building with his wife Maren Dittelberg and two maids. Jens Petersen Lund (1731-1797), a landscape painter, resided in the building with two maids. Marie Elise Bet: Abbels, a widow, resided in the building with her son Peter Abbels (clockmaker) and the lodger Hans Klein /clockmaker). Johan Houmann, a tailor, resided in the building with his wife Elisabeth Rasmusdatter and the lodger Peder Olsen (carpenter at Holmen). Niels Rasmussen Lund, a servant, resided in the building with his second wife Sophie Thorsen and an eight-year-old son from his first marriage.

The property was later destroyed in the Copenhagen Fire of 1795, together with most of the other buildings in the area.

=== 19th century ===
The present building on the site was constructed in 1792–03 for Jean Wendel. He was married to Marrigje van der Linde. The property was listed in the new cadastre of 1806 as No. 314 in Købmager Quarter. It was owned by Bertel Wad at that time.

The property was home to 27 residents in five households at the 1845 census. Hans Sanders West, a grocer (urtekræmmer), resided on the first floor and part of the ground floor with his wife Mancine Hermine West (née Meyer), rqo ubnmarried daughters (aged 25 and 32), two grocers (urtekræmmersvende, employees9), two apprentices, two male servants (one of them a six-year-old boy) and two maids. Peter Erhard August Høeg, a clockmaker, resided on the second floor and part of the ground floor with his wife Anna Emilie Høeg (née Høeg), their one-year-old Nyfødt Pigebarn and one maid. Niels Nicolai Bryde (1801-1879), a merchant trading on Iceland, resided on the second floor with his wife Johanne (Hanne) Bergitte Bryde (née Petersen), their 14-year-old son Johan Peter Thorkelin Bryde (1831-1910) and one maid. Ferdinand Christensen, a tailor, resided on the third floor with his wife Lovise Christensen and their one-year-old son Villiam Christensen. Rasmus Eriksen, a rye bread baker and flour merchant, resided in the basement with his wife Hane Margrethe (née Westsøe(and one maid.

The property was home to 24 residents at the time of the 1880 census. The ground floor of the building housed a grocery shop at the corner and a barber shop next door in NyAdelgadee. Hans Christian Hansen, a grocer (urtelræmmer) resided on the ground floor with the floor clerk Franchaus Leopold Viliare Nielsen and the apprentice Nicolai Olsen. Alfred Viggo Niels Kristian Nielsen, a barber's apprentice, resided in the barber shop. Christian Marius Holm, a clock maker. resided in the first-floor corner apartment with his wife Thora Vilhelmine Holm (née Leig) and their 14-year-old foster son Marius Edvard Holm. Carl Gustav Bechstrøm, a tailor, resided in the second-floor corner apartment with his wife Marie Cathrine Bechstrøm. Caroline Margrethe Bentzen, a former school teacher, resided in the other second-floor apartment. Martin Sørensen, a sailor, resided in the third-floor corner apartment with his wife Marie Christine Sørensen, their two children (aged one and nine) and two lodgers. Frederikke Petrine Amalie Myhre, a cleaning lady, resided in the fourth-floor corner apartment with a seamstress, another cleaning lady and a brick-layer. Conradine Emilie Charlotte Bartz, another unmarried woman employed with washing and needlework, resided in the other fourth-floor apartment. Peter Jensen, a barkeeper, resided in the basement with his wife Elna Jensen, (née Petersen).

=== 20th century ===
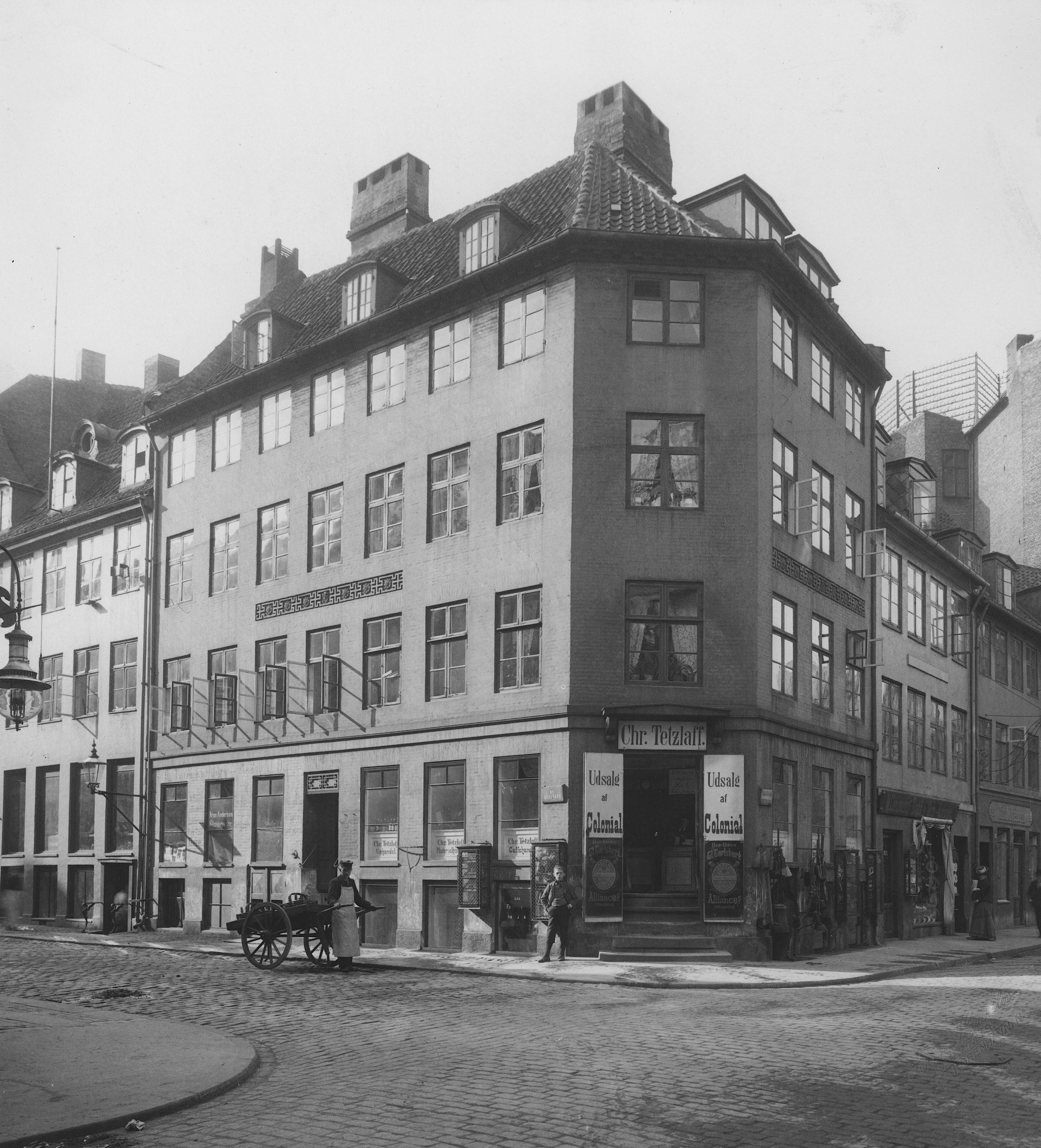
The building photographed by Frederik Hendriksen in 1903.

Chr. Tetzlaff's grocery shop (Chr. Tetzlaff Colonialforretning) was located at the corner in the 1900s. Aron Andersen 's tailor shop was located next to it in Ny Adelgade.

The building was listed in the Danish registry of protected buildings and places in 1982.

== Architecture ==
The building is constructed with four storeys over a walk-out basement. It has a seven-bays-long facade towards Ny Adelgade, a three-bays-wide facade towards Grønnegade and a chamfered corner bay. The latter was dictated for all corner buildings by Jørgen Henrich Rawert's and Peter Meyn's guidelines for the rebuilding of the city after the fire so that the fire department's long ladder companies could navigate the streets more easily. The facade is plastered and white-painted. It is finished with a belt course above the ground floor, a Greek key freeze with rosette ornamentation above the three central windows of the first floor towards Ny Adelgade and a modillioned cornice. The belt course above the ground floor is broken by a hood mould supported by corbels above the corner entrance.. The pitched red tile roof features three dormer windows towards Ny Adelgade and two dormer windows towards Grønnegade. The roof is pierced by two chimneys, a large one on the side that faces the yard and a smaller one in the roof ridge towards Ny Adelgade.

== Today ==
The ground floor of the building houses a café houses a café at the corner and a small shop next door in Ny Adelgade. Two residential apartments are located on each of the upper floors: A larger corner apartment and a smaller apartment in Ny Adelgade.
