= IJG =

IJG may refer to:

- Islamic Jihad Group, now known as the Islamic Jihad Union, a militant Islamist organization
- Independent JPEG Group, which develops the libjpeg image processing library
- I. J. Good, a British mathematician and cryptologist
- Ingrid Jespersens Gymnasieskole, private school in Copenhagen, Denmark
