= Letz Sushi =

Danish sushi restaurant chain

- Company type: Private
- Industry: Restaurant
- Genre: Japanese restaurant
- Founded: 2003
- Founder: Louise Ertman Baunsgaard
- Defunct: 2024
- Fate: Lack of profitability
- Headquarters: Copenhagen, Denmark
- Area served: Denmark
- Key people: Søren Flemming Larsen (CEO)
- Website: www.letzsushi.dk

Letz Sushi was a Danish chain of sushi restaurants headquartered in Copenhagen. It focused on sustainable sushi and saving the world oceans. It consisted of 20 restaurants and a retail division delivering to 500 supermarkets and convenience stores. The chain has been closed in 2024.

== History ==
Letz Sushi was founded when Louise Ertman Baunsgaard opened a sushi take-away restaurant at Nordre Frihavnsgade No. 15 in March 2003. Over the next decade, it grew with an additional five restaurants. In 2013, it merged with Dondon Sushi, a chain founded by Jysk heir Jacob Brunsborg in 2008, bringing the total number of Letz Sushi restaurants up to 13. In 2017, Letz Sushi became wholly owned by Lars Larsen Group. In 2023, Søren Flemming Larsen replaced Anders Barsøe as CEO of the company.

== Restaurants ==
- Nørre Farimagsgade 63, City Centre
- Overgaden Neden Vandet 41, Christianshavn
- Nordre Frihavnsgade 15, Østerbro
- Amagerbrogade 142, Amager
- Værnedamsvej 8, Vesterbro
- Kalvebod Brygge 59m Vesterbro
- Elmegade 23, Nørrebro
- Fredensvej 1, Nørrebro
- Godthåbsvej 49, Frederiksberg
- Strandvejen 68C, Hellerup
- Lyngby Hovedgade 49, Kongens Lyngby
- Rungsted Bytorv 3, Ringsted
- Vedbæk Stationsvej 14, Vedbæk
