= Ingrid Jespersen =

Danish pedagogue

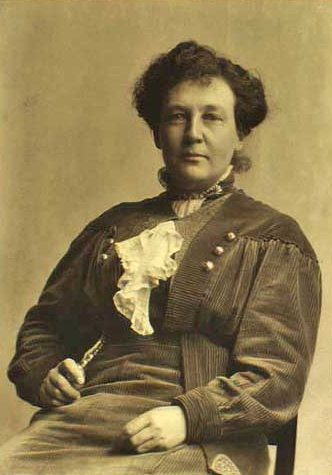
Ingrid Jespersen

Ingrid Jespersen (1867–1938) was a Danish pedagogue and school principal. The founder of Copenhagen's Ingrid Jespersens Gymnasieskole in 1894, initially a primary school for girls, she introduced a number of groundbreaking measures in support of girls' education in Denmark.

== Bibliography ==
The daughter of the bookseller Edvard Julius Marie Jespersen (1831–1904) and his wife Henriette Klein (1831–1922), Jespersen was born in Lyngby on 24 January 1867. Raised in Copenhagen with her siblings, from the age of 11 she set her mind on becoming a headmistress. After attending N. Zahle's School, she completed teacher training at N. Zahle's seminary in 1889 and went on to qualify as a school principal in 1891. For the next three years she was not only head of Elisabeth Gad's School but taught women at the Hjælpeforening for kvindelige Haandarbejder under L.I. Brandes. In 1894, she founded Ingrid Jespersen's Girls School in the Østerbro district of Copenhagen. Starting with only 19 pupils, she extended the school over the following years. In 1897, when there were 100 pupils, new buildings were added followed a series of additional extensions up to 1932. The school was given the status of a gymnasium in 1906, the first students matriculating in 1908.

Despite various educational reforms, the institution continued to operate as a private school with Jespersen as principal until 1930. Thereafter she continued as chair of the school board for the remainder of her life. She was responsible for various pedagogical developments: the first physics and chemistry laboratory in a Danish school in 1903, the inclusion of housekeeping in the curriculum, and the first girls' school to include carpentry as part of the matriculation examination. The school was also the first to offer foreign travel for its pupils with trips to Italy, Switzerland and Austria.

On the academic front, Jespersen introduced a far more demanding curriculum than that required by the authorities, taking a special interest in covering the main figures of the Modern Breakthrough. She also taught poetry, encouraging her pupils to write verse. Under the pen name Hella S. Lynge, she published two books for schoolgirls: Kursuskammerater (Coursemates, 1894) and Ungdom (Youth, 1896). She also served on various school boards and commissions.

Jespersen spent her retirement translating several of Pearl S. Buck's works into Danish. In 1930, she was awarded the Danish Medal of Merit.

Ingrid Jespersen died on 22 November 1938 in Ullerød, Karlebo Municipality. Her ashes are buried in the cemetery of Egebæksvang Church, south of Helsingør.
