= Sankt Annæ Plads =

Square in Copenhagen, Denmark

Coordinates: 55.6815°N 12.5915°E

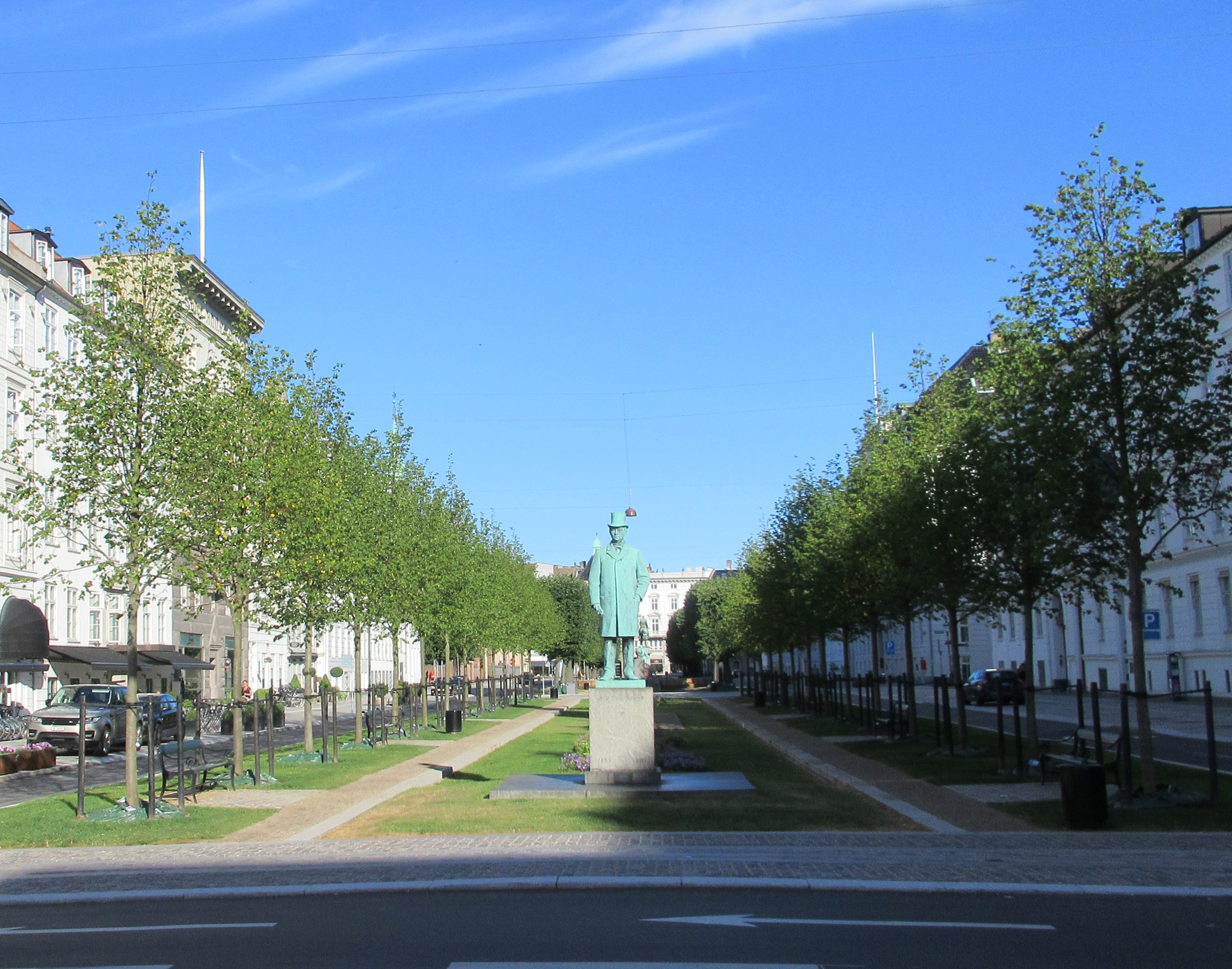
Sankt Annæ Plads with the Tietgen statue

Sankt Annæ Plads (English: St. Ann's Square) is a public square which marks the border between the Nyhavn area and Frederiksstaden neighborhoods of central Copenhagen, Denmark. It is a long narrow rectangle which extends inland from the waterfront, at a point just north of the Royal Danish Playhouse at the base of the Kvæsthus Pier, now known as Ofelia Plads, until it meets Bredgade. A major renovation of the square was completed in 2016.The Garrison Church is located on the south side of the square. Amaliegade, one of the two axes on which Frederiksstaden is centered, extends from the square.

The square has a central garden complex along its length with an equestrian statue of Christian X of Denmark facing Bredgade.

== History ==
=== 18th century ===
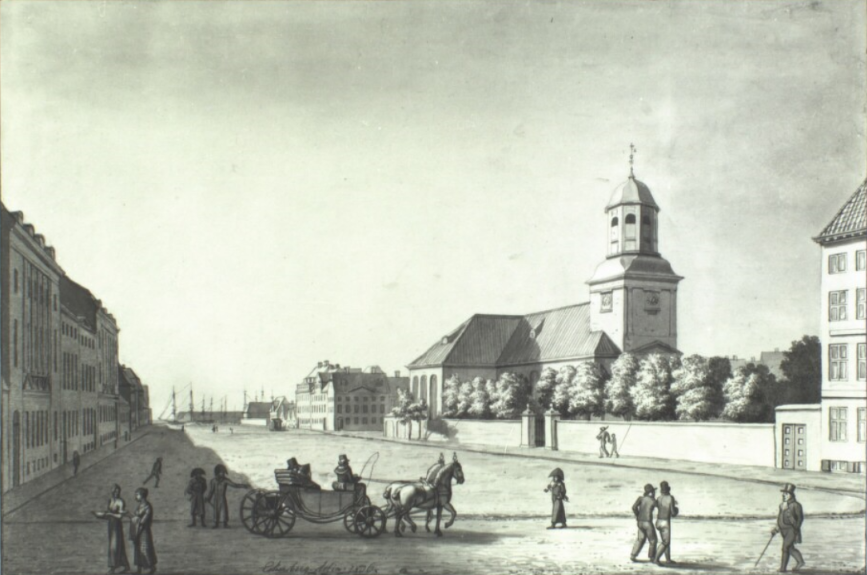
C. W. Eckersberg: Sankt Annæ Plads, 1801

Sankt Annæ Plads was originally part of a canal which continued along present-day Bredgade and Esplanaden, surrounding Sophie Amalienborg. The Royal Naval Hospital was built by Hans van Steenwinckel the Younger on reclaimed land on the south side of the canal in 1686. It later moved to Christianshavn and the building was then used as poorhouse and later storage space. The Garrison Church was built in 1703–06.

=== 19th century ===
The square was created when the canal was filled in connection with the foundation of the ambitious new Frederiksstaden district in circa 1750.

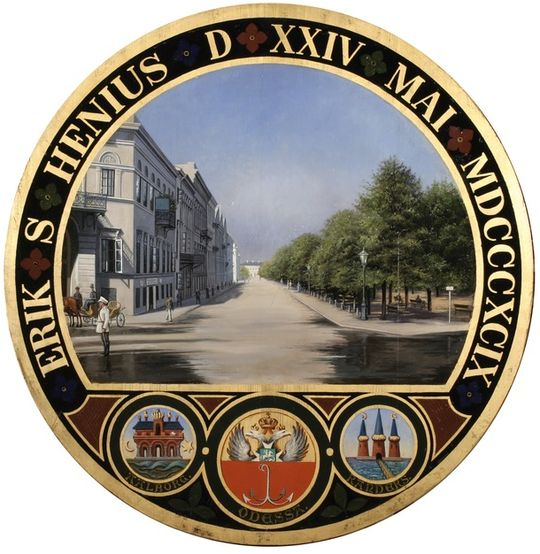
Sankt Annæ Plads on a ceremonial target from the Royal Copenhagen Shooting Society, 1898

The central garden complex was established in 1852. It was the result of one of the first successful initiatives of the recently founded Society for the Beautification of Copenhagen. With the establishment of the Kvæsthus Pier at the end of the square, the site had become a hub for the new steam ferries that had begun to operate between Copenhagen and the largest cities in the provinces. The ferry company Det Forenede Dampskibs-Selskab (The United Steam Ferry Companies) was from 1871 based in the former naval hospital. The building was later expanded.

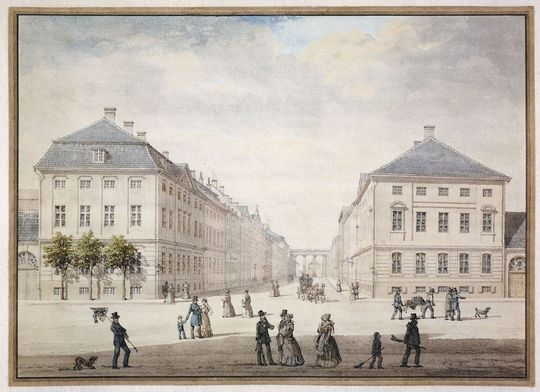
Sankt Annæ Plads on a drawing by H.G.F. Holm from circa 1842

The company would for the next many years dominate the square with hectic activity around the clock, both with passengers and goods. Eventually first cargo ships and later also passenger boats disappeared from the area. In 2003 the Royal Naval Hospital building was acquired by the Danish Nurses' Organization which has since been headquartered in it. The neighbouring building, originally built by DFDS in 1890, has since 1871 housed the JL Foundation which owns the J. Lauritzen shipping company as well as 56% of DFDS.

=== 20th century ===
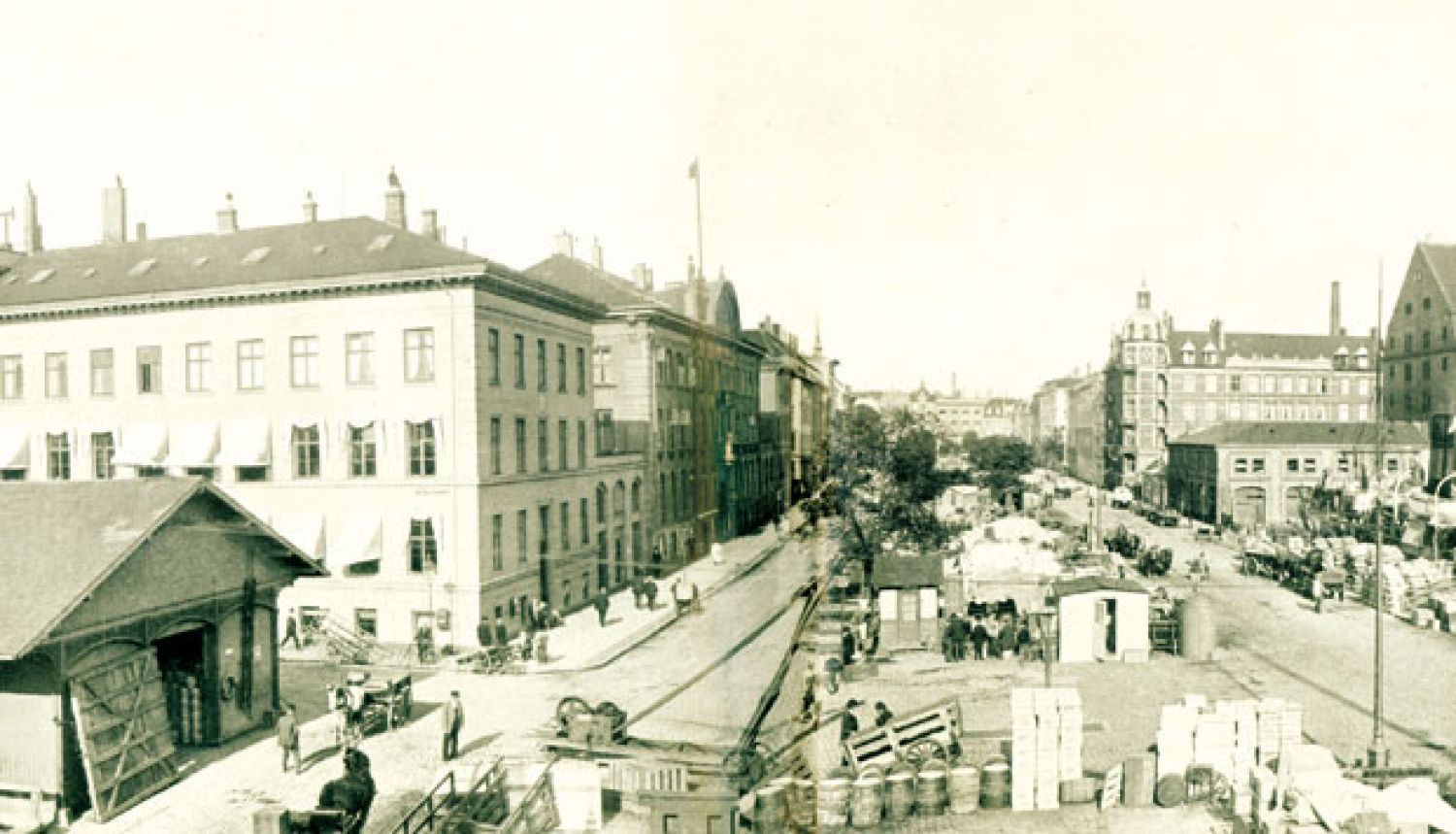
Sankt Annæ Plads with harbor activity in 1916

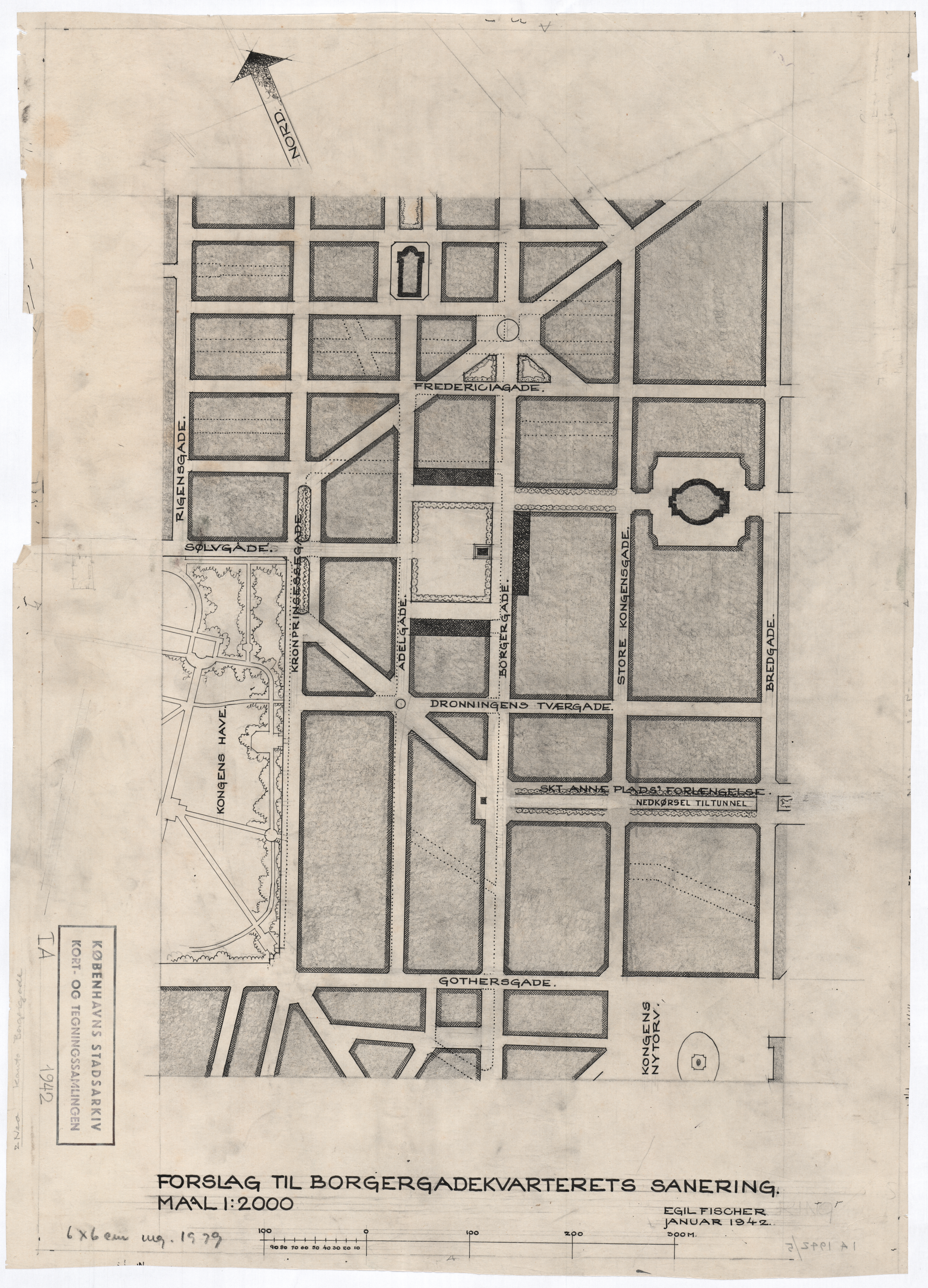
Holsøe's proposal for linking the western end of the square with Kronprinsessegade

In 1942, it was proposed to extend Sankt Annæ Plads westwards to Landegreven and onwards to Kronprinsessegade. The proposal involved the demolition of Bredgade 27–33. Another proposal would extend the square in a more northernly direction. Neither of the proposals were realized.

In 2014 a major renovation began, with a scheduled completion in 2016. The stated aims of the renovation were to provide a better experience for pedestrians and cyclists, as the waterfront project of Kvæsthusmolen plans to draw more activity to the area. The project resulted in the removal of some of the trees that lined the center of the street, although more trees are due to be planted in their place.

== Notable buildings ==
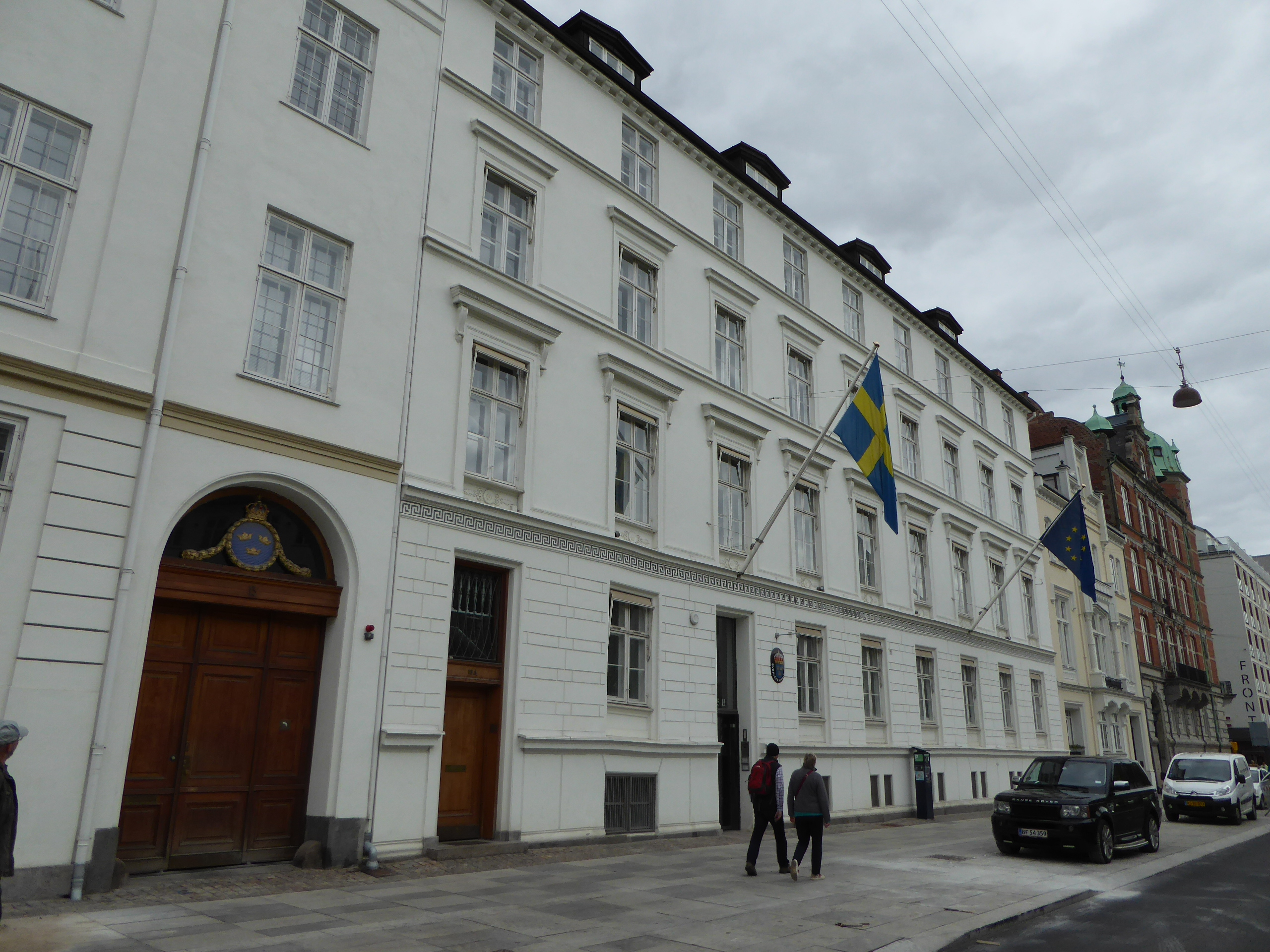
Embassy of Sweden

A number of buildings on the square date from back when it was first established. These include the symmetrically arranged twin houses at No. 7–9 (1750) and the Jegind House at No. 15, which were all designed by Nicolai Eigtved who also created the masterplan for Frederiksstaden. Copenhagen Mason's Guild is headquartered in No. 7 while No. 15 houses the Embassy of Sweden. The Prince William Mansion at No. 13 was completed in 1751 by an unknown architect but has later been extended with an extra floor.

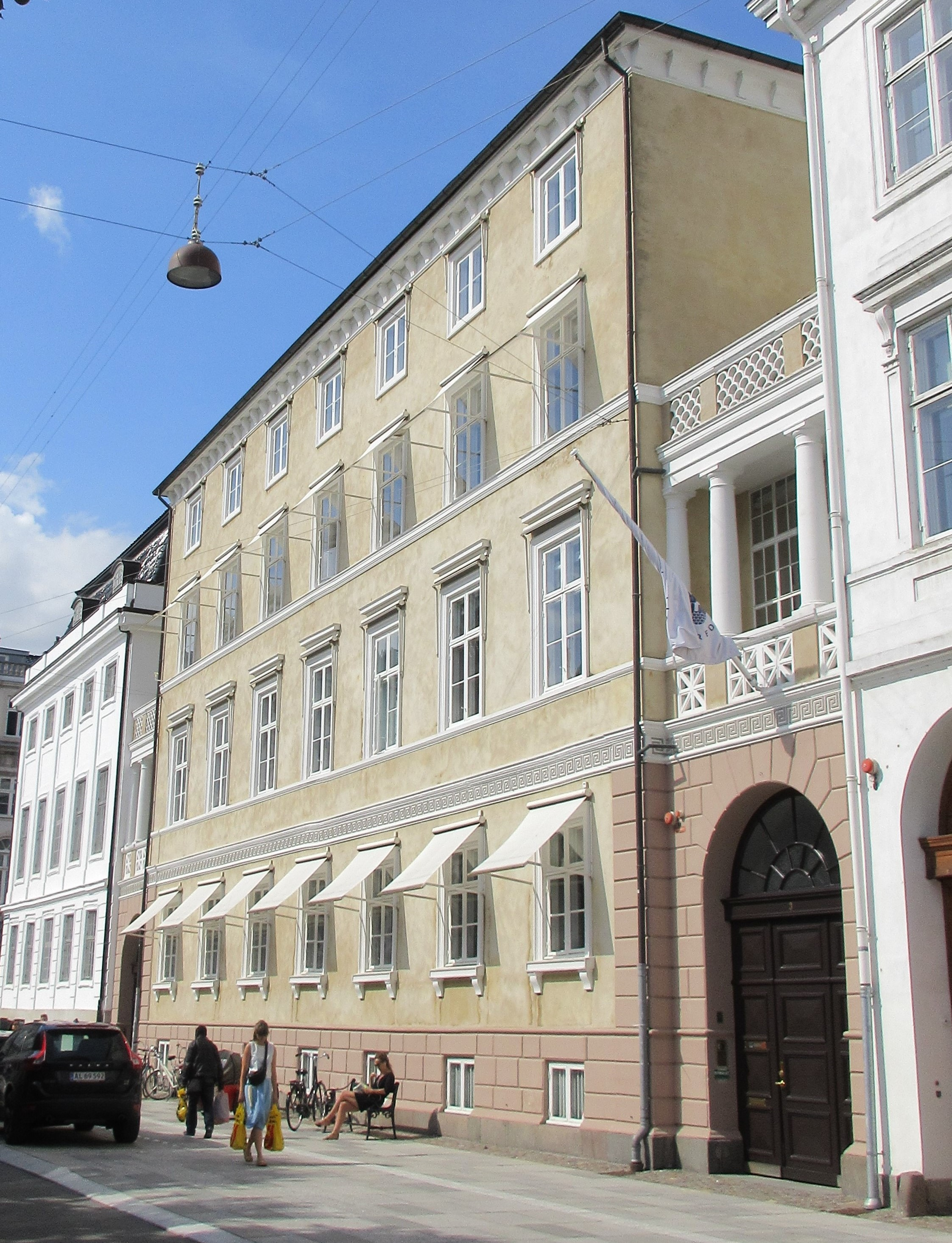
No. 1-3

Slightly younger are Andreas Hallander's building at No. 10 (1785, listed) and city builder Jørgen Henrich Rawert's two consecutive homes at No. 5 and No. 11, built in 1796 and 1801 respectively.

Other buildings are in the Historicist style that dominated Danish architecture in the second half of the 19th century. Listed in 1932, No. 1–3 was built between 1847 and 1849 to designs by Gustav Friedrich Hetsch as an extension of the Lindencrone Mansion on Bredgade. Also listed is No. 2, on the opposite corner with Bredgade, which was completed by Niels Sigfred Nebelong in 1866. The Neo-Gothic mansion at No. 17 was built in 1868 as winter residence of the Knuthenborg counts.

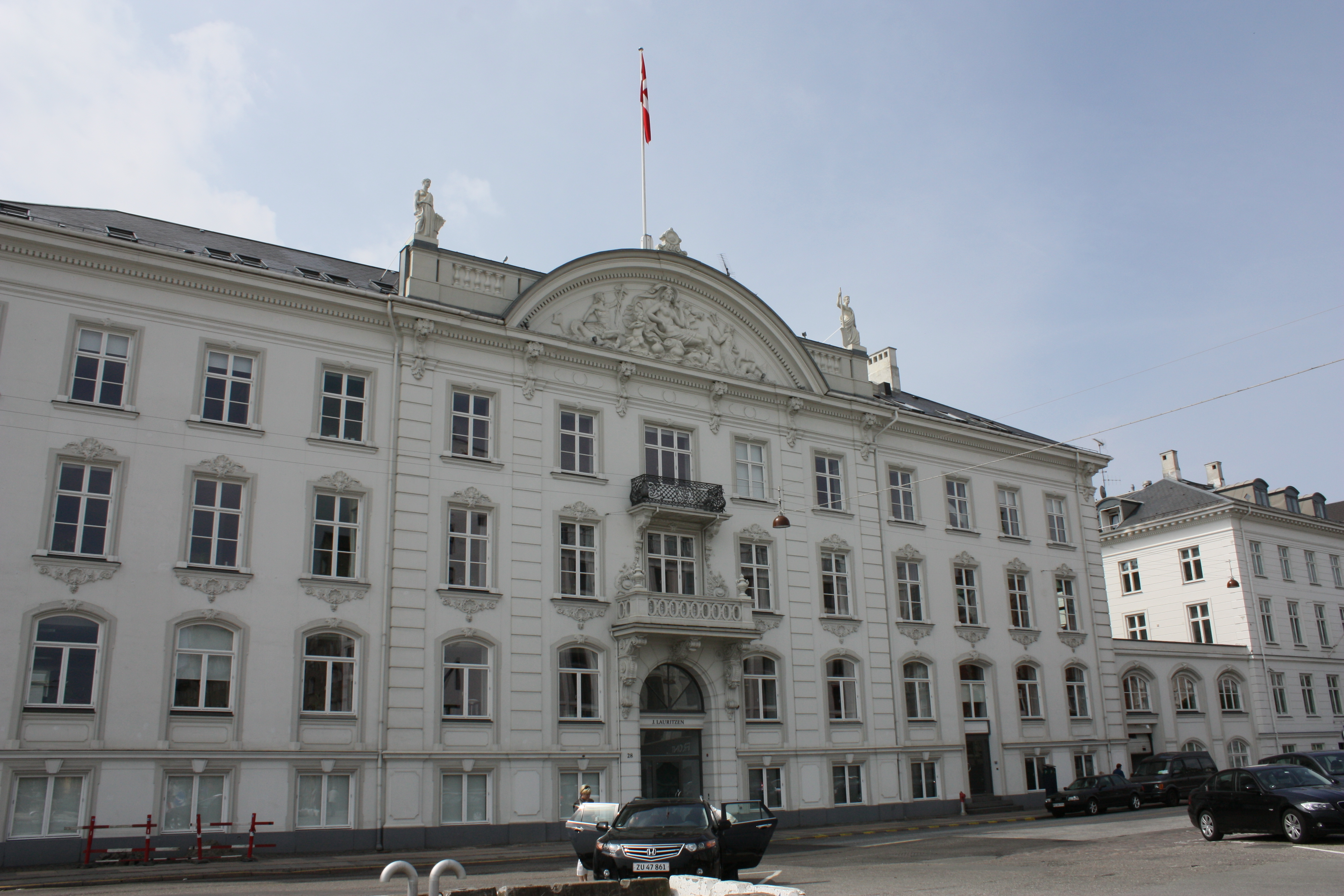
DFDS' former headquarters

The former DFDS headquarters at No. 24–30 was designed by Albert Jensen. The two corner pavilions now houses the Embassy of Finland (No. 24) and the Danish Nurses' Organization (No. 30). No. 26–28 has housed the shipping company J. Lauritzen A/S as well as the Lauritzen Foundation, but they have moved and the building is now for sale (2016). Albert Jensen also designed the original home of the Brock School of Commerce on the other side of the square, at No. 19, which is from 1891.

The square is also home to two hotels. Hotel Skt. Annæ, a boutique hotel which reopened after a major renovation in 2016, is located at No. 18. Hotel Scandic Waterfront overlooks Ofelia Plads.

== Public art and monuments ==
The Carl Frederik Tietgen statue was originally located at Børsen but moved to its current site in 1904. It was designed by Rasmus Andersen.

A statue depicting composer Johan Peter Emilius Hartmann was also installed on the square in 1904. It was designed by August Saabye.

The equestrian statue of Christian X, which faces Bredgade, was added to the garden complex in 1954. It was designed by Einar Utzon-Frank.

A memorial with a bust of Franklin D. Roosevelt was unveiled at the square on May 5, 1953, to commemorate America's role in World War II. It is a copy of a bust created by Jo Davidson in 1933.

A bust of Herman Bang by Ingeborg Plockross Irminger from 1901 was installed on the square in 2012.

== Cultural references ==
Sankt Annæ Plads is used as a location in several Olsen-banden films. It is for instance seen at 0:34:43 in The Olsen Gang Outta Sight (1977) and the gang steals a precious Ming vase in one of the mansions on the square at0:10:06 in The Olsen Gang Sees Red.

== See also ==
- Store Strandstræde
