= Nordre Frihavnsgade =

Street in Copenhagen, Denmark

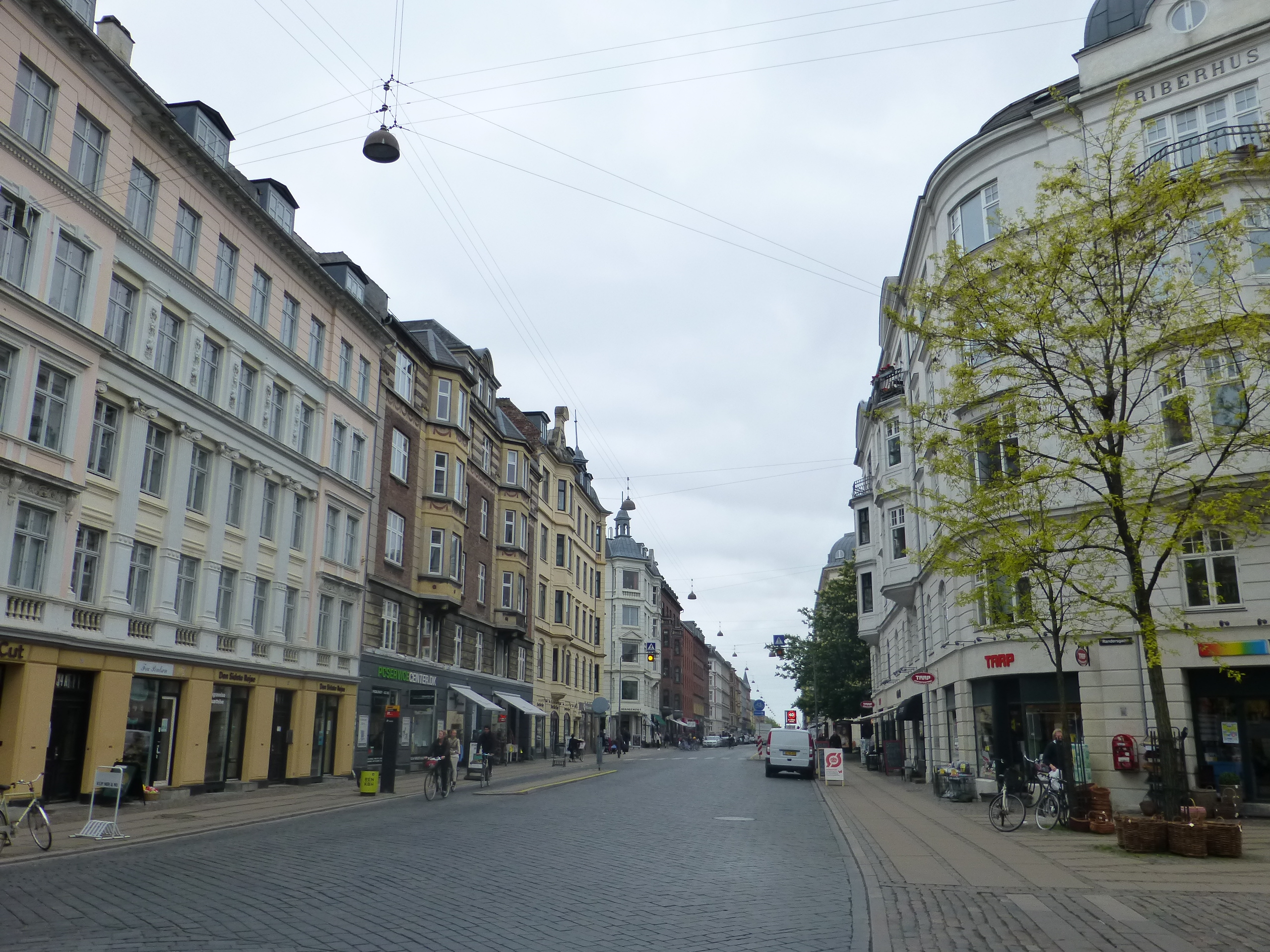
- Nordre Frihavnsgade with the corner of Randersgade
- Length: 963 m (3,159 ft)
- Location: Copenhagen, Denmark
- Postal code: 2100
- Coordinates: 55°42′7.56″N 12°35′0.24″E

Nordre Frihavnsgade (lit. 'Northern Freeport Street') is a street in the Østerbro district of Copenhagen, Denmark, linking the junction Trianglen in the southwest with Østbanegade In the northeast. The street passes the two small squares Victor Borges Plads and Melchiors Plads. An underpass under the raised railway tracks at the end of the street provides access to Nordhavn's Århusgade neighbourhood.

Nordre Frihavnsgade is one of Copenhagen's most popular shopping- and café streets with many food, clothing and antique stores. Many urban "Hipster"-shops can be found on the street as well, including many restaurants. Famous buildings on the street include Ingrid Jespersens Gymnasieskole, a private school located near the Trianglen-end of the street.

== History ==
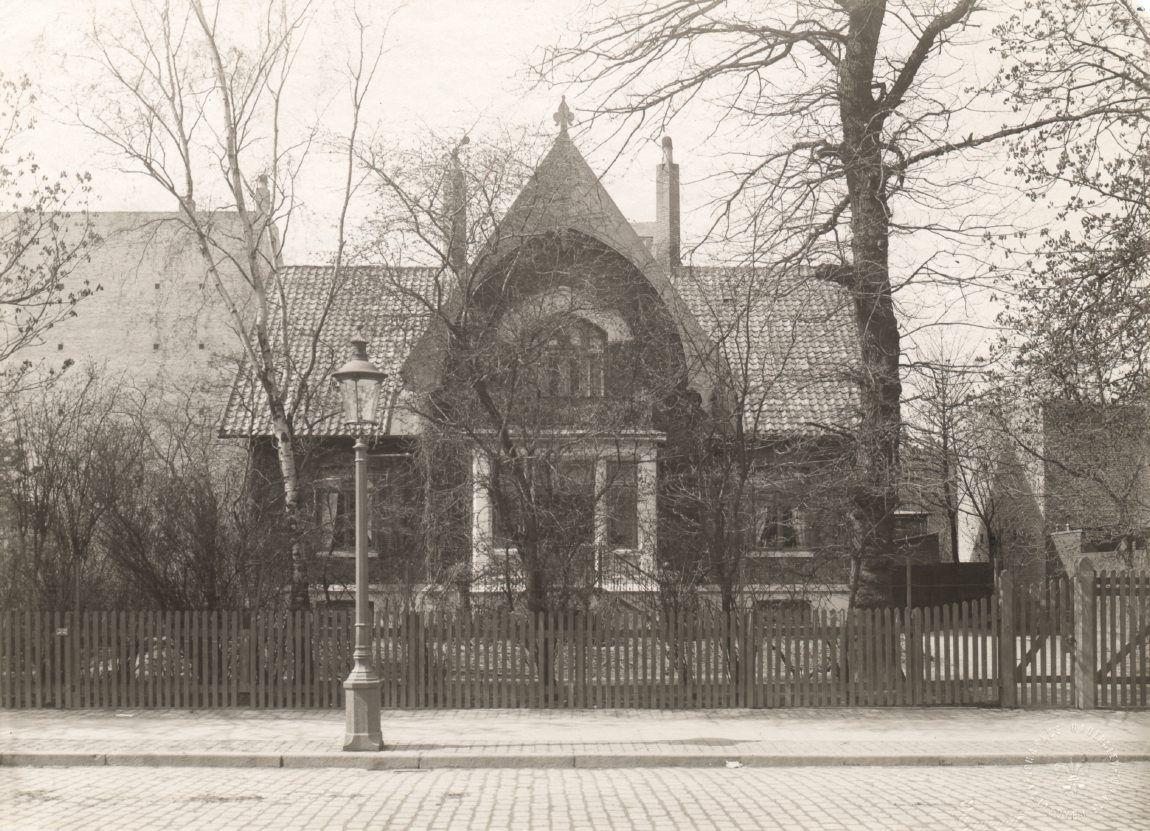
Kalkbrænderivej 27

The first section of the street was originally part of Kalkbrænderivejen (literally "The Lime Plant Road") which provided a link to the lime plant which was established on the coast to the north of the city in 1731.

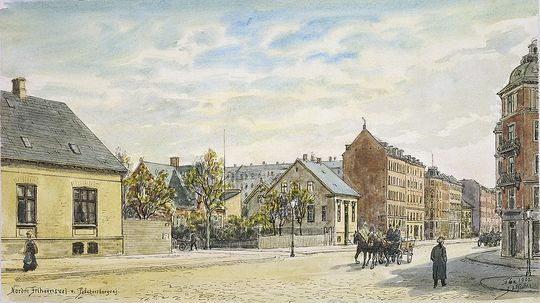
Nordre Frihavnsvej in 1902, watercolour by Janus Laurentius Ridter School

The name was changed to Nordre Frihavnsvej ("Northern Freeport Road") in 1892 in connection with the establishment of the Freeport of Copenhagen. The land along the street was built over with apartment buildings during the following decade and the name of the street was changed to Nordre Frihavnsgade ("Northern Freeport Street") in 1906. The building was listed in 1995.

== Notable buildings and residents ==
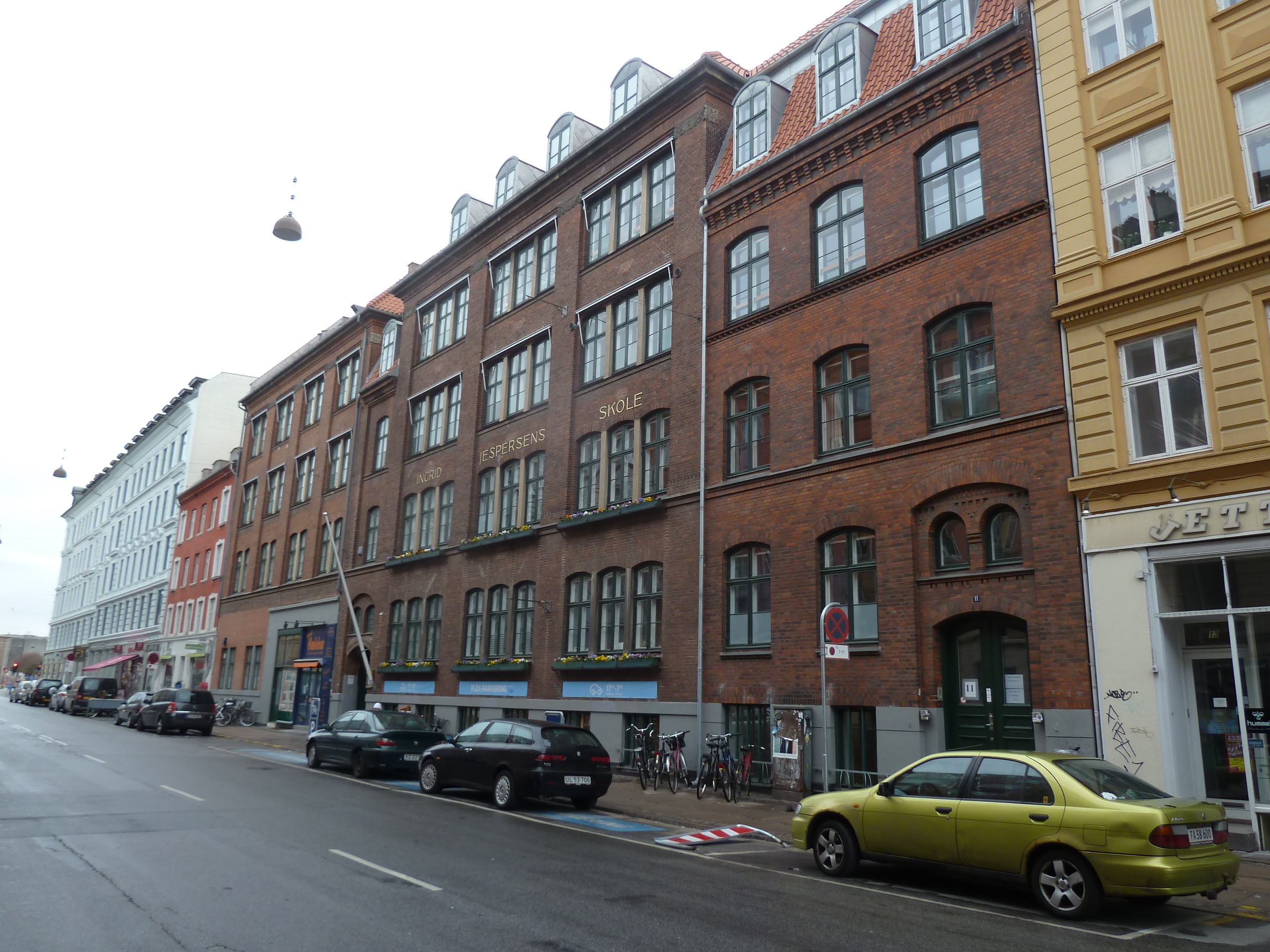
Ingrid Jespersen's School

The property Petersborg on the corner of Trianglen is from 1888 and was designed by Ferdinand Vilhelm Jensen.

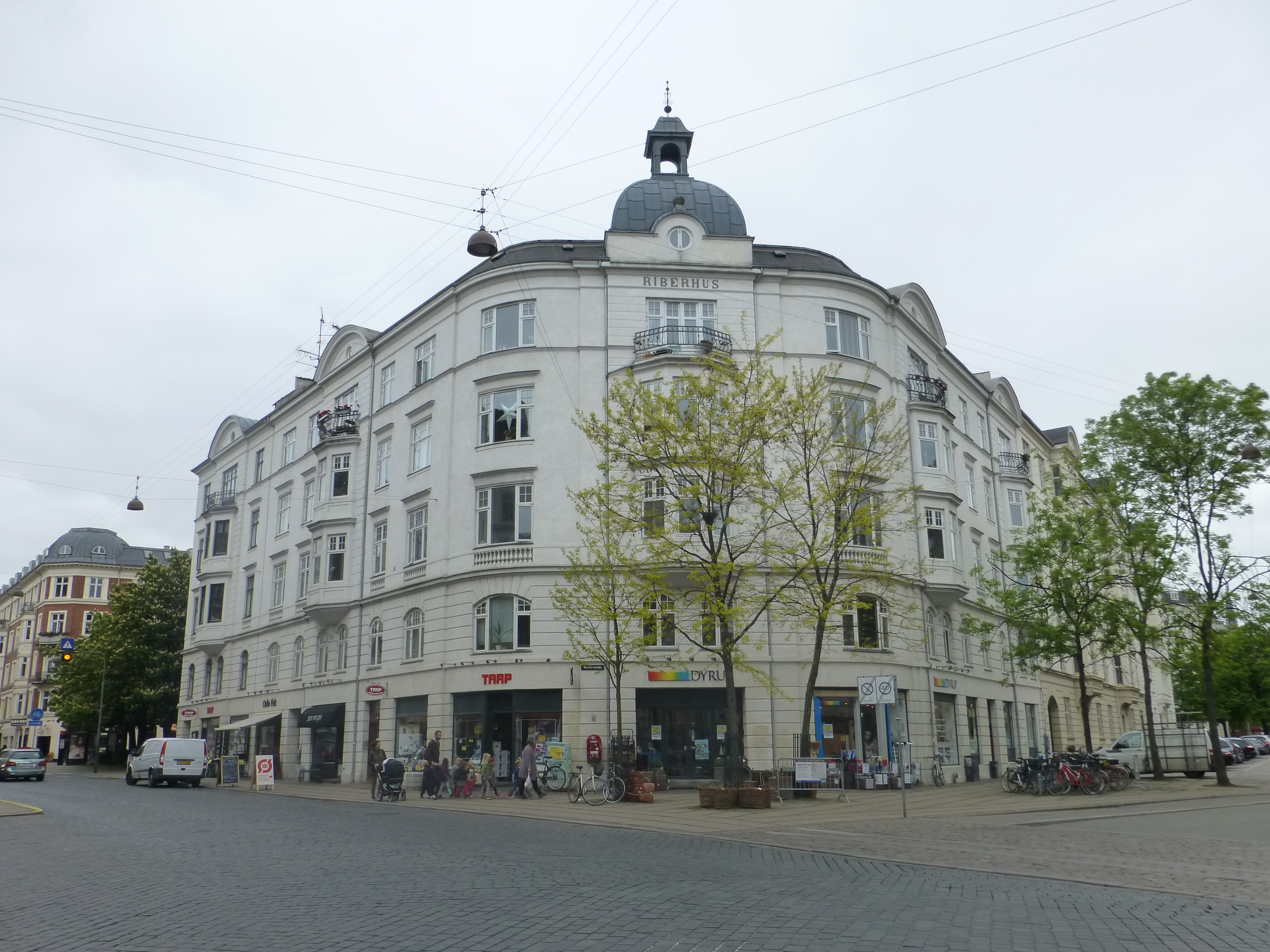
Riberhus (No. 31) corner with Randersgade

Ingrid Jespersen's School at No. 11 was established as a girls' school in 1894 and was for many years one of the most progressive of its kind in the country. It was originally based in rented rooms in Gustav Adolph Hagemann's former house but it was replaced by a three-storey building in 1897. In 1929, it took over the former police station at No. 9. The block at No. 31, between Victor Borges Plads and Randersgade, is one of the more stately properties along the street. It is from 1900 and was designed by Thorvald Sørensen.

The first Letz Sushi restaurant opened at No. 15 in 2003.
