= Victor Borges Plads =

Public square in Østerbro, Copenhagen, Denmark

Coordinates: 55.7016°N 12.5808°E

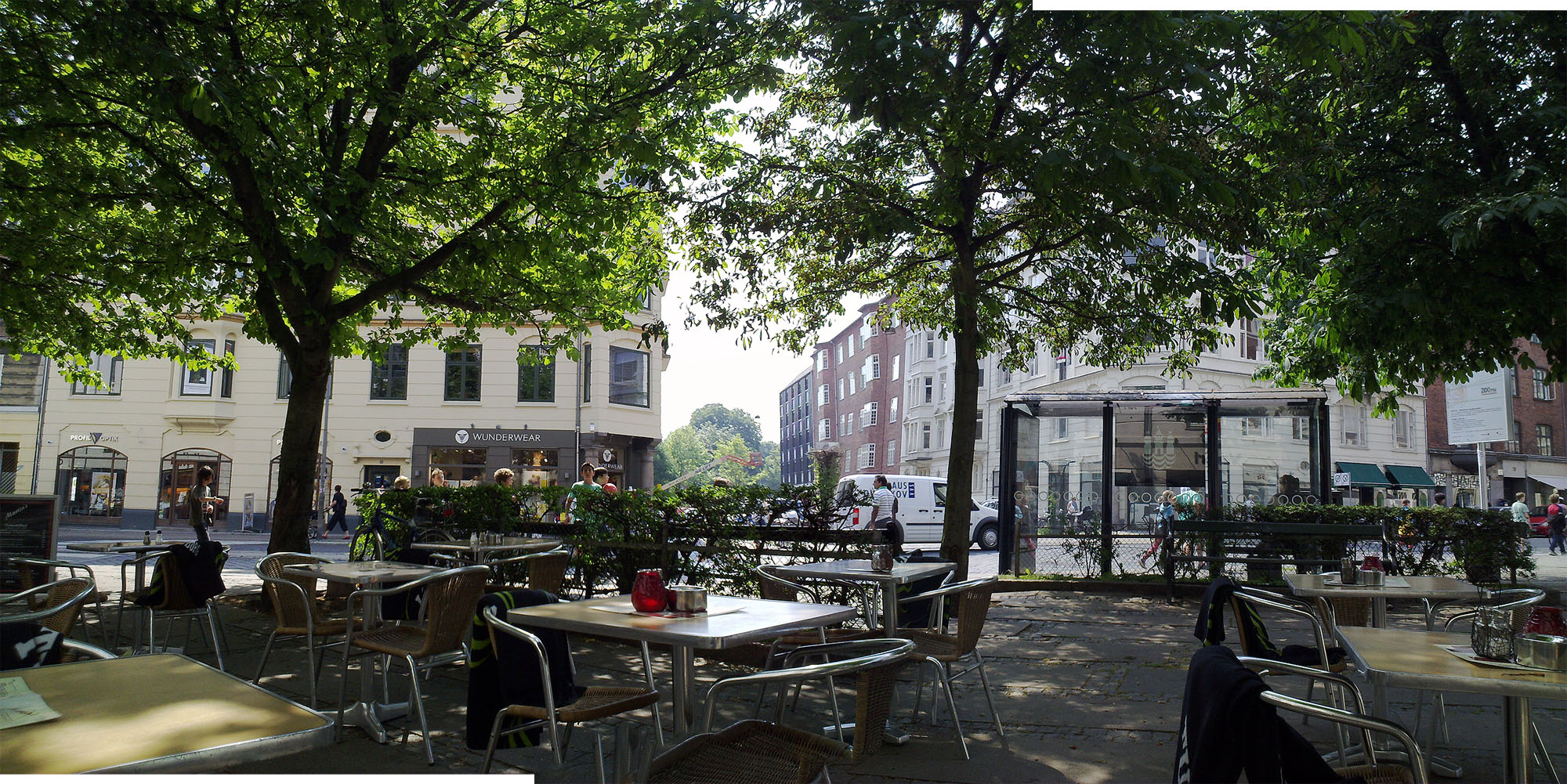
Outdoor service at Victor Borges Plads

Victor Borges Plads is a public square in the Østerbro district of Copenhagen, Denmark.

== Overview ==
It is located on Nordre Frihavnsgade, roughly halfway between Trianglen and Strandboulevarden, and has several restaurants and cafés with outdoor service.

The square is named after Victor Borge, who was born in nearby Classensgade. Previously known informally as Hjertepladsen ("Heart Square"), it received its current name in October 2002, following Borge's death on 23 December 2000. In celebration of Borge's centennial in 2009, a statue was erected on the square.
