= Viborggade =

Street in Copenhagen, Denmark

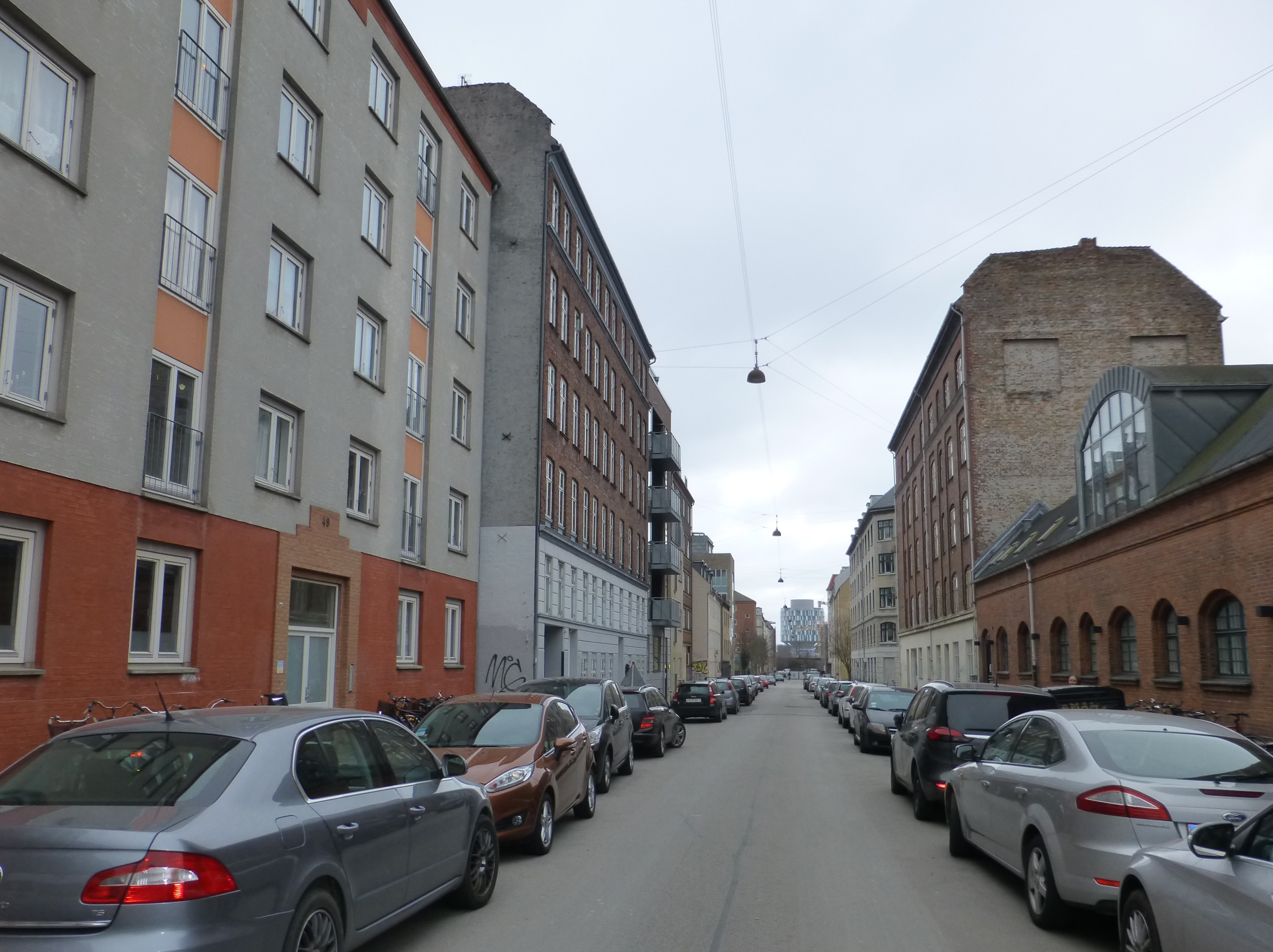
- Interactive map of Viborggade
- Length: 565 m (1,854 ft)
- Location: Copenhagen, Denmark
- Quarter: Østerbro
- Postal code: 2100
- Nearest metro station: Nordhavn
- Coordinates: 55°42′18.25″N 12°34′43.53″E
- West end: Østerbrogade
- Major junctions: Randersgade
- East end: Strandboulevarden

Viborggade (lit. 'Viborg Street') is a street in the Østerbro district of Copenhagen, Denmark, linking Østerbrogade in the west with Strandboulevarden in the east. The street is closed to through traffic at Bopa Plads, a small square located at the intersection with Randersgade.

== History ==
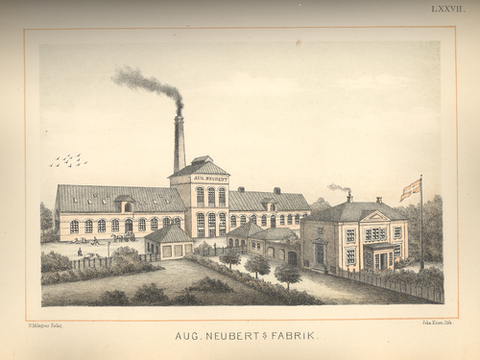
August Neubert's Textile Factory

The area south of Jagtvej and east of Østerbrogade was up until the middle of the 19th century a rural area known as Slaftervangen ("The Butchers' Pasture"). It was owned by the city but leased by the Butchers' Guild and used for livestock fattening. In 1852, the so-called demarcation line was moved from Jagtvej to The Lakes, paving the way for redevelopment of the area. The older, eastern section of the street was initially called Batterivej ("Battery Road". The name referred to Kalkbrønbderihavns Batteri ("Limery Dock Battery", a coastel fortress constructed at the site in the 1850s as part of Copenhagen's new defensive ring.

J. Kornbecks Asfaltfabrik opened in the street in 1865. In 1867, it was joined by August Neubart's Textile Factory. A small working-class neighbourhood of two-storey buildings developed around the factories.

In 1886, the street was extended to Østerbrogade and renamed Viborggade. The new name was in line with a naming scheme introduced by Thorvald Krak according to which streets in the area were named after Danish market towns.

The industrial activities continued for more than a hundred years. J. Kornbecks Asfaltfabrik had by 1897 been taken over by Trækompagniet, a wood factory, and by 1920 by Københavns Smergelfabrik. The factory in Voborggade was decommissioned when a new one in Maribo on Lolland was occupied in 1975. August Neubert's Textile Factory was later taken over by Pia Lys, a manufacturer of candles. The factory was destroyed in a fire in 1982.

== Notable buildings ==
A few of Københavns Smergelfabrik's former buildings have survived. The building at No. 70 is from 1907 and was designed by Anton Rosen.

== Transport ==
The western end of the street is located approximately halfway between the metro stations at Poul Henningsens Plads (510 m) and Trianglen (590 m). The eastern end of the street is located approximately 500 metres from the Nordhavn S-train station.
