= Ny Adelgade =

Street in Copenhagen, Denmark

Coordinates: 55.6812°N 12.5840°E

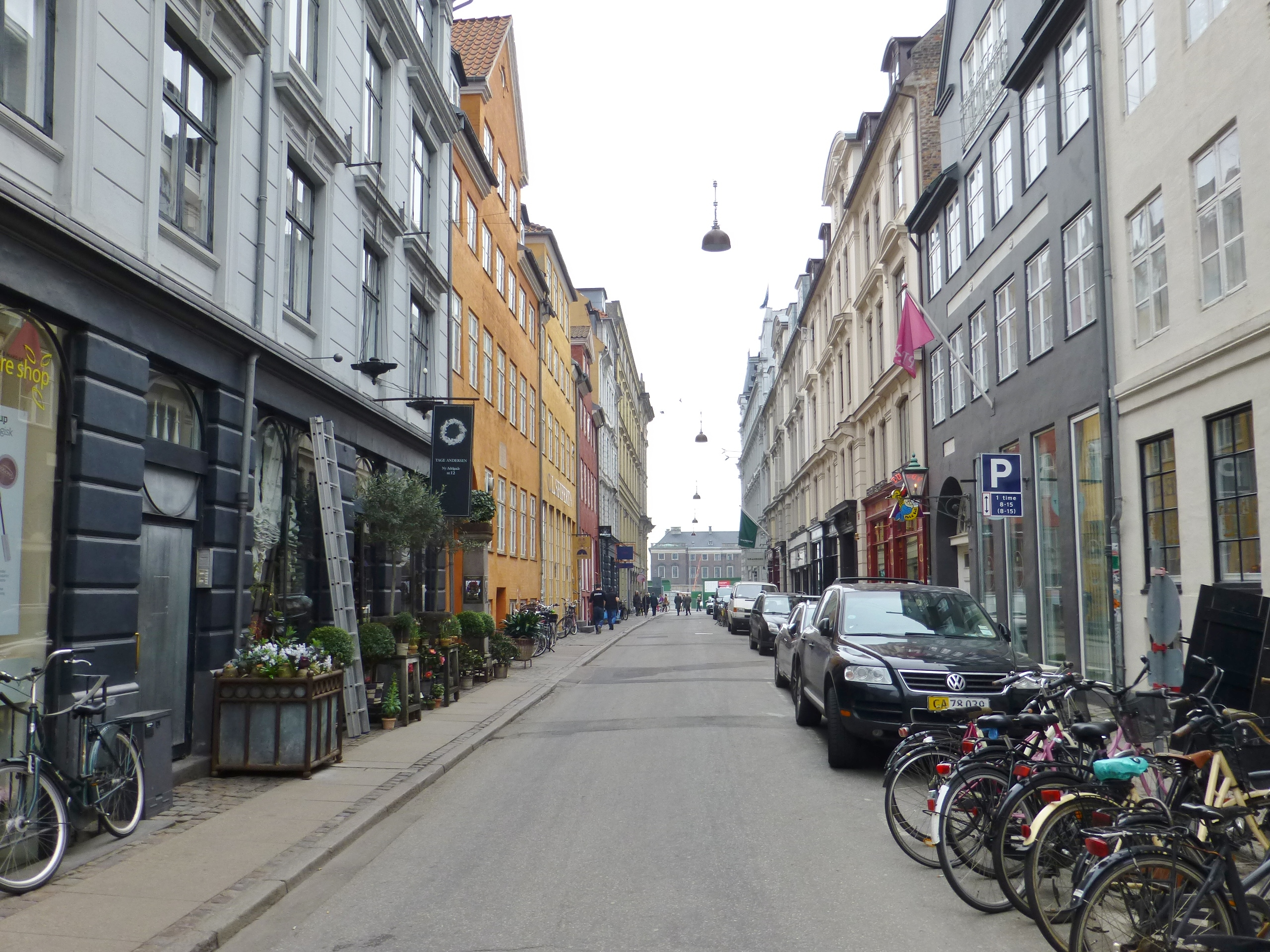
Ny Adelgade

Ny Adelgade is a street in the Old Town of Copenhagen, Denmark. It runs from Kongens Nytorv in the east to Grønnegade in the west.

== History ==
Ny Adelgade was created after Copenhagen's East Rampart was moved from its original course along present-day Gothersgade to present-day Øster Voldgade. Former viceadmiral and governor of Norway Niels Trolle had to part with some of his estate at the site for the project in 1668. In 1681, the street is referred to as "Lille Adelgade (Little Adelgade") at the Corps de Guard" and in 1701 as "Bag Corps de Guarden" ("Behind the Corps de Guard").

In the 18th century, the street was for a while known as Lille Grønnegade. In 1721, the French actor and restaurateur Etienne Capion was granted a license to open a theatre. Lille Grønnegade Theatre's building was completed in January 1722 and the first performance, in September that same year, was Molière's l'Avare. The theatre closed in 1728.

== Notable buildings and residents ==
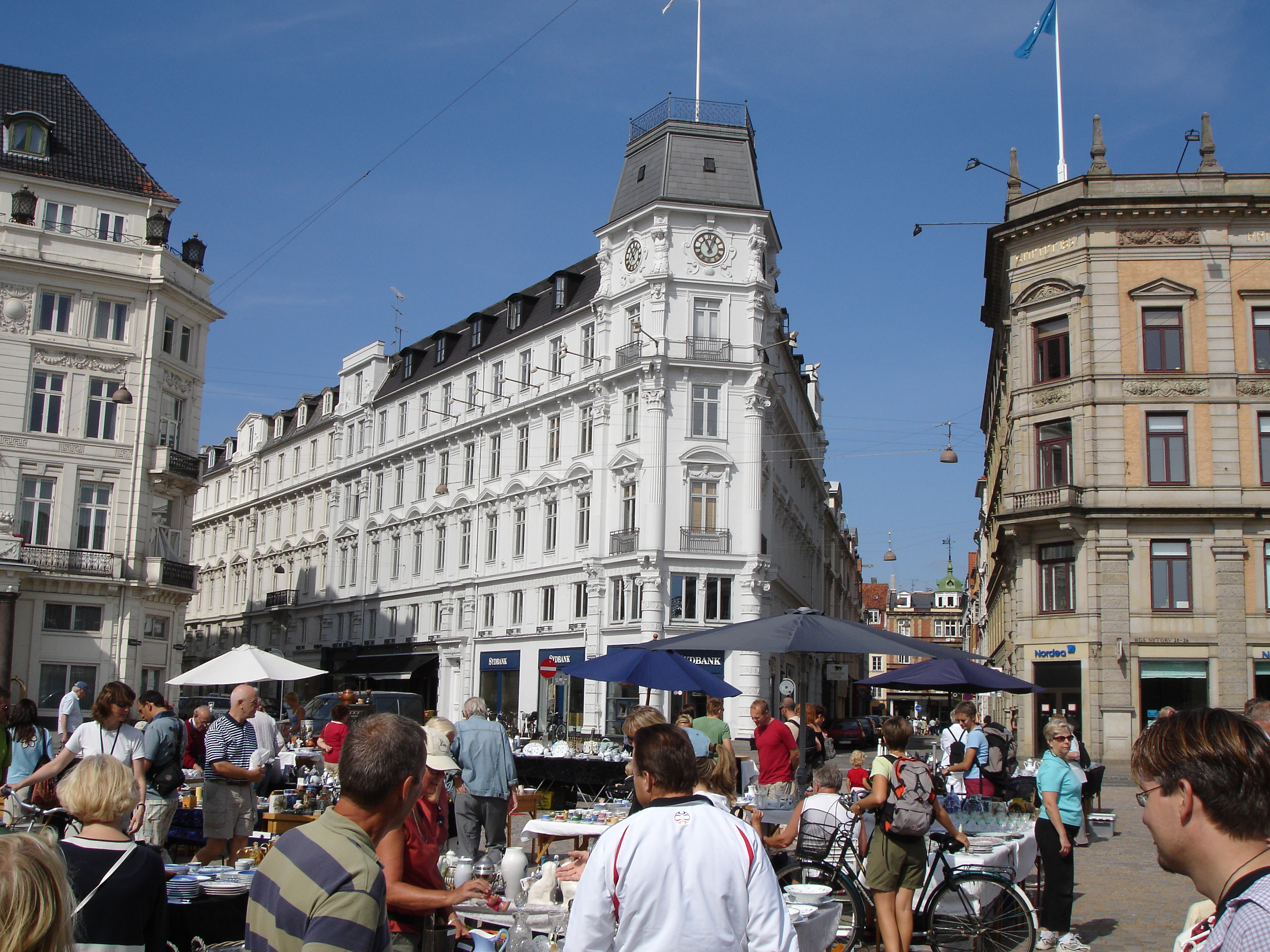
Ludvig Fenger's buildings at No. 3-5 viewed from Kongens Nytorv

No. 3 and No. 5 are from the 1870s and were designed by Ludvig Fenger. The six-bay house at No. 6 dates from before 1738 and is listed. No. 9 (Ny Adelgade 9/Grønnegade 32) is from 1802 to 1803 and is also listed. The flower artist Tage Andersen is based at No. 12.
