= Frankrigsgade =

Street in Copenhagen, Denmark

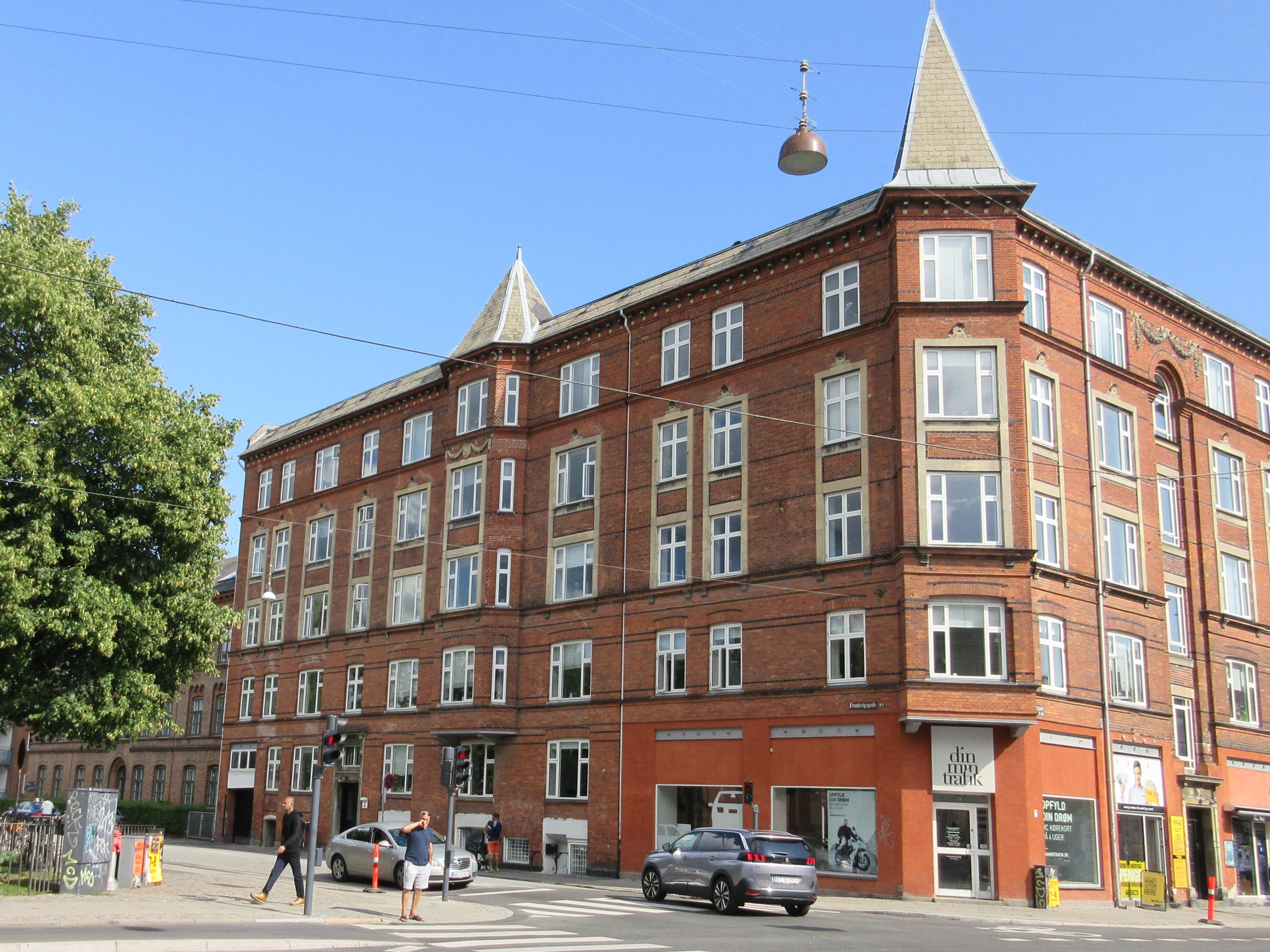
- Interactive map of Frankrigsgade
- Length: 578 m (1,896 ft)
- Location: Amager Øst, Copenhagen, Denmark
- Postal code: 2300
- Nearest metro station: Amagerbro

Frankrigsgade (lit.: "France Street") is a street in the Amager district of Copenhagen, Denmark. It runs from Amagerbrogade in the southwest to Moselgade in the northeast. Frankrigsgade Svømmehall, an indoor covered swimming pool, is located at No. 35.

== History ==
The street follows one of the two old main streets in Sundbyøster.

The street was originally named Østrigsgade but this name was changed to Frankrigsgade in 1901(1902 when Sundbyerne was merged with Copenhagen Municipality which already had an Østrigsgade. The new street name was in line with other streets in the area which were named after countries in Southern Europe.

The street continued straight to Lybækgade and then continued in a more southeastern direction down to Øresundsvej. The direct continuation of the straight section of the street was called Lauenborggade. Lauenborggade was 1942 incorporated in Frankrigsgade while the eastern, more winding section of Frankrigsgade was renamed Wittenberggade and connected to the extension of Østrigsgade.

Several industrial enterprises were located in the street. Christian Ludvig Scheel owned a cardboard factory at the southern corner with Amagerbrogade. The site had previously belonged to Jacob Holm who owned a ropewalk in Reberbanegade. The cardboard factory was from circa 1900 continued by Scheel's son-in-law, Carl Reiermann, who moved it to the other side of Amagerbrogade.

Gruberts Metalvarefabrik, a manufacturer of lamps, chandeliers and other metal products, was until c.1940 located at the corner of Frankrigsgade and Wittenberggade. The factory had been founded by Heinerich August Grubert in Tyrolsgade in 1863 but was by his sons moved to the site in Frankrigsgade in circa 1915. It was with its up to 250 workers one of the largest employers in the area.

== Notable buildings and residents ==
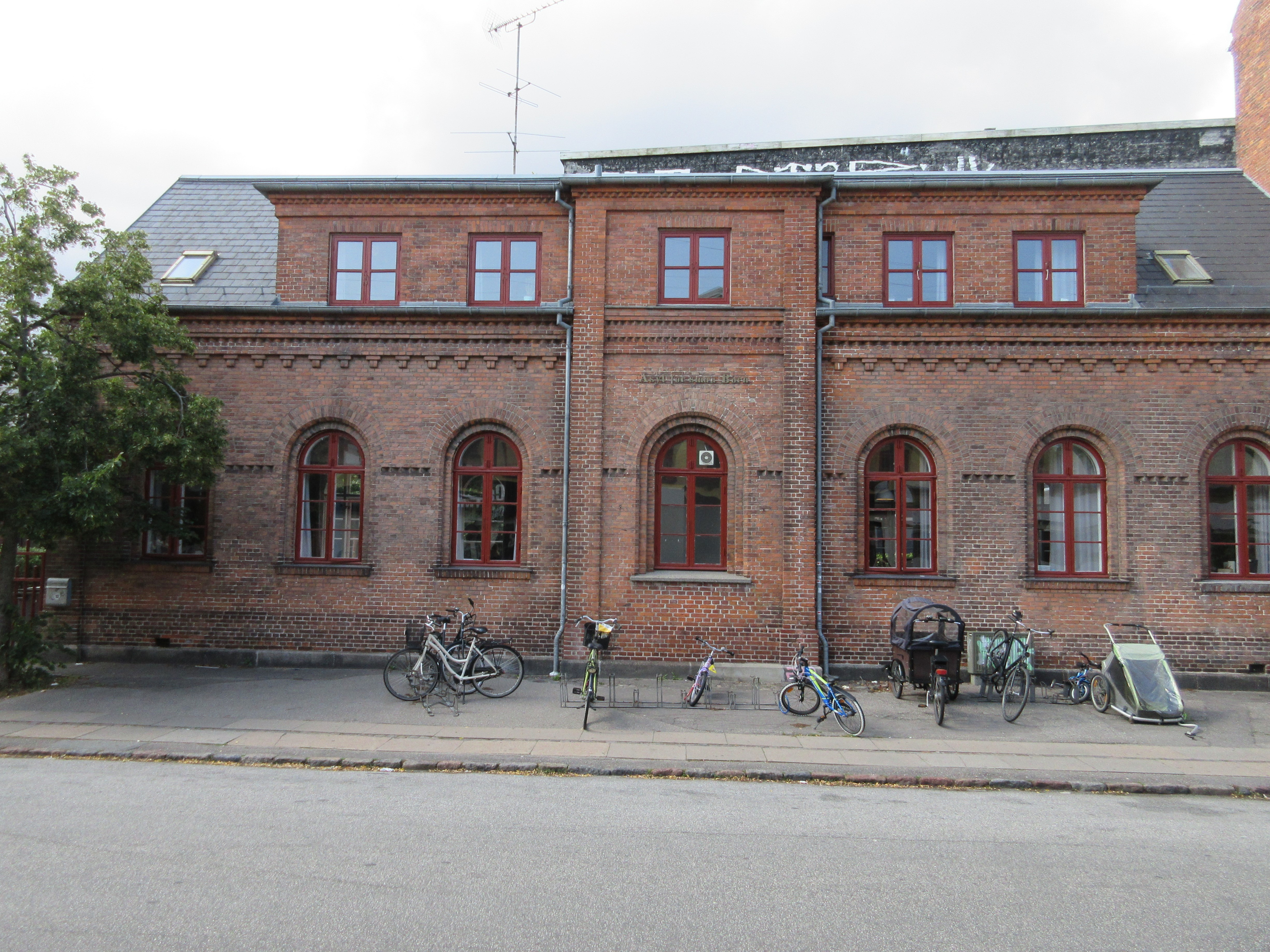
No. 3: The former Sundby Asyl

Sundby Church is located at the northern corner with Amagerbrogade. It was completed in 1870 to a Historicist design by Hans Jørgen Holm. The former Sundby Asyl (No. 3) was a daycare donated by Jacob Holm.

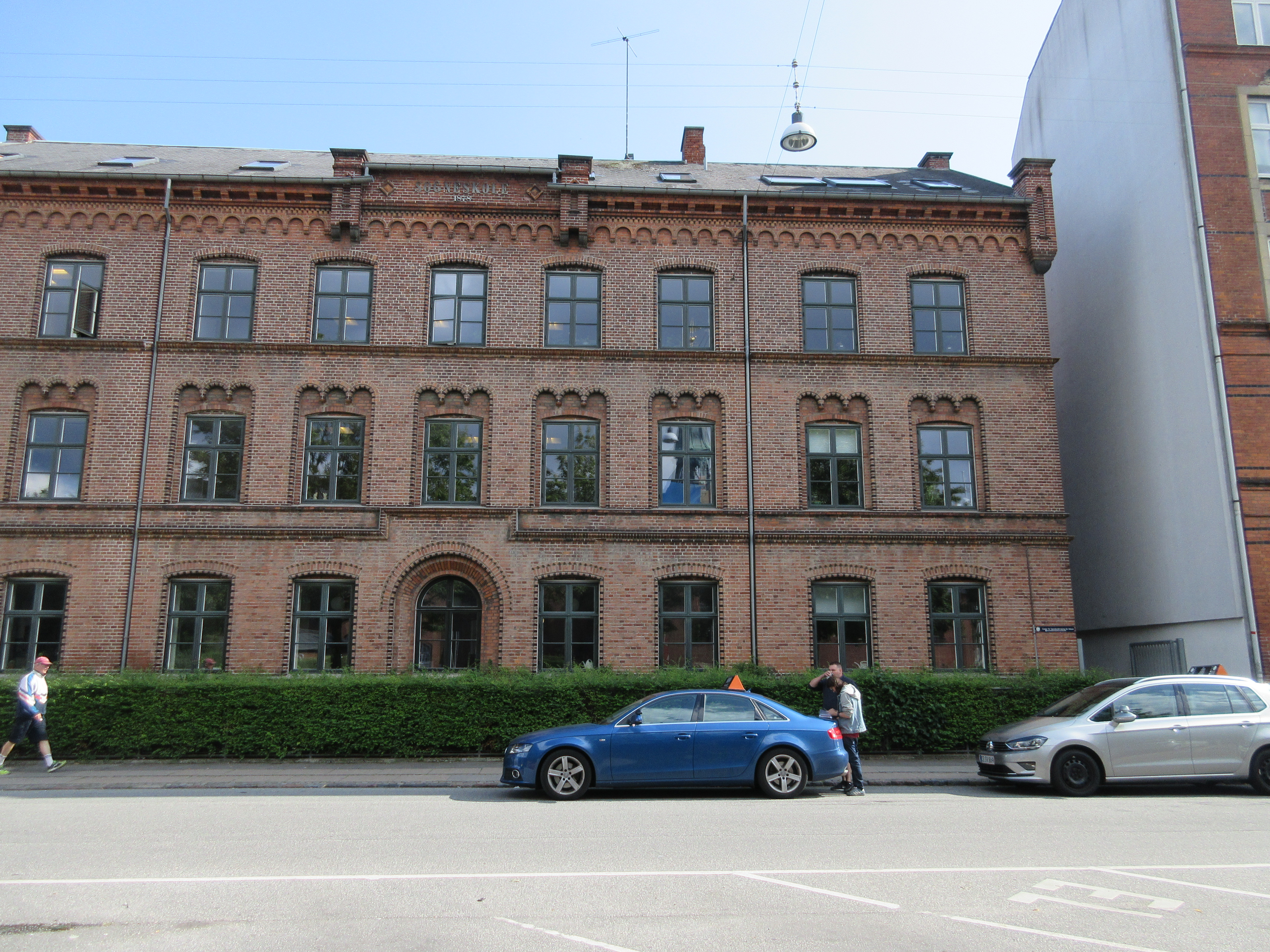
No. 4: The former Frankrigsgade School

The former Frankrigsgade School (No. 4) was built in 1878 as a public school for pupils from both Sundbyøster and Sundbyvester. Sundbyerne was then part of the Parish of Tårnby. Two rooms and an archive were used by Tårnby Parish Council. An extra building designed by Holger Klaumann Krøyer and located to the rear of the main wing was constructed in 190. It was taken over by Copenhagen Municipality and renamed Frankrigsgade School when Sundbyerne was merged with Copenhagen Municipality in 1902.

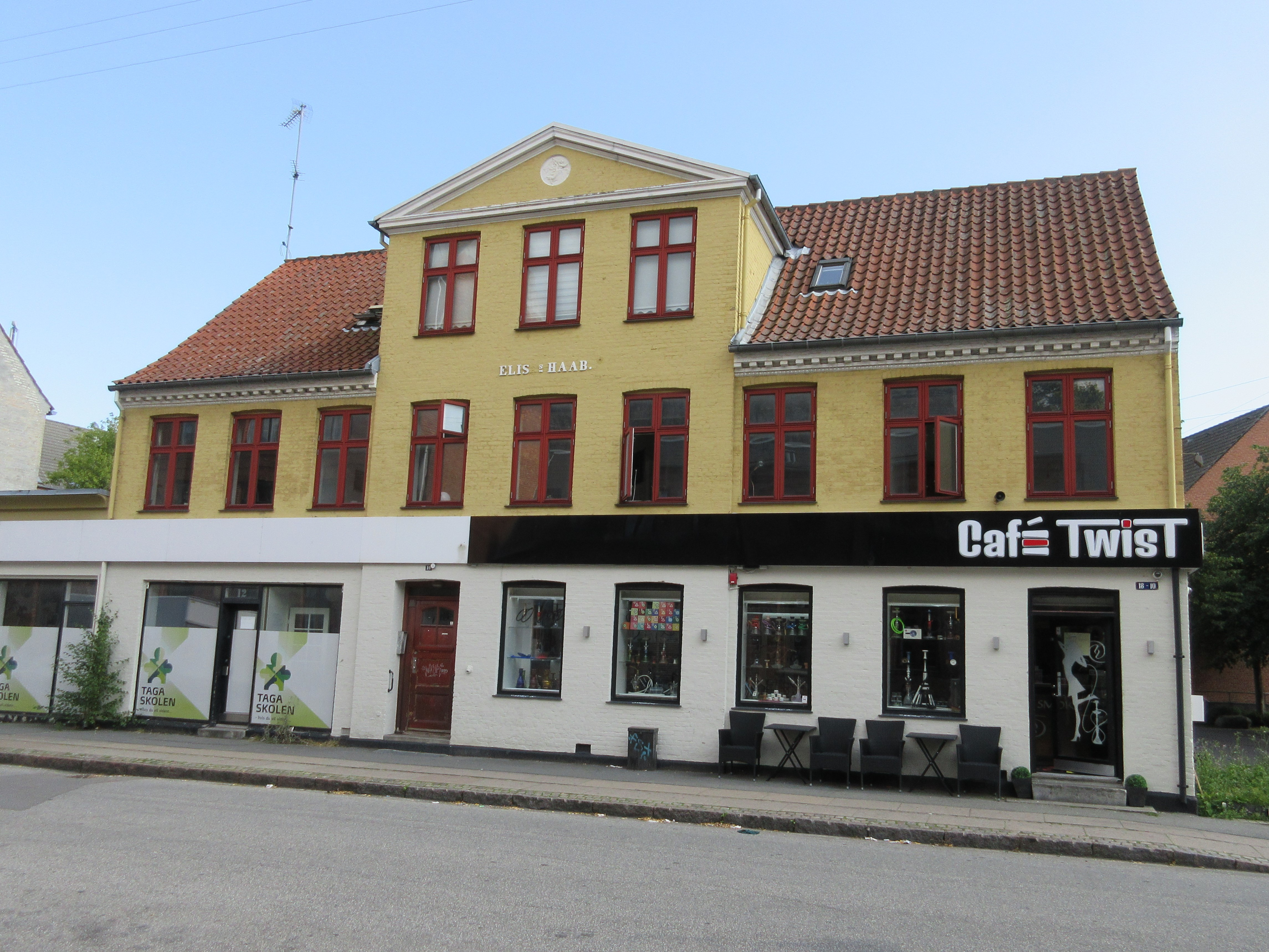
No. 10: The former Knud Klaumanns Skole

Another former school, Knud Klaumanns Skole, is located at No. 10. The building is from 1868.

Frankrigsgade Badeanstalt og Svømmehal (No. 35), a public baths and indoor swimming pool complex, opened in 1944. The buildings were designed by city architect Poul Holsøe in collaboration with Carl Bie.

Frankrigsgade Kollegiet (No. 50) is a dormitory with 126 dwellings for students. It was inaugurated in 1972.
