= Ingrid Jespersens Gymnasieskole =

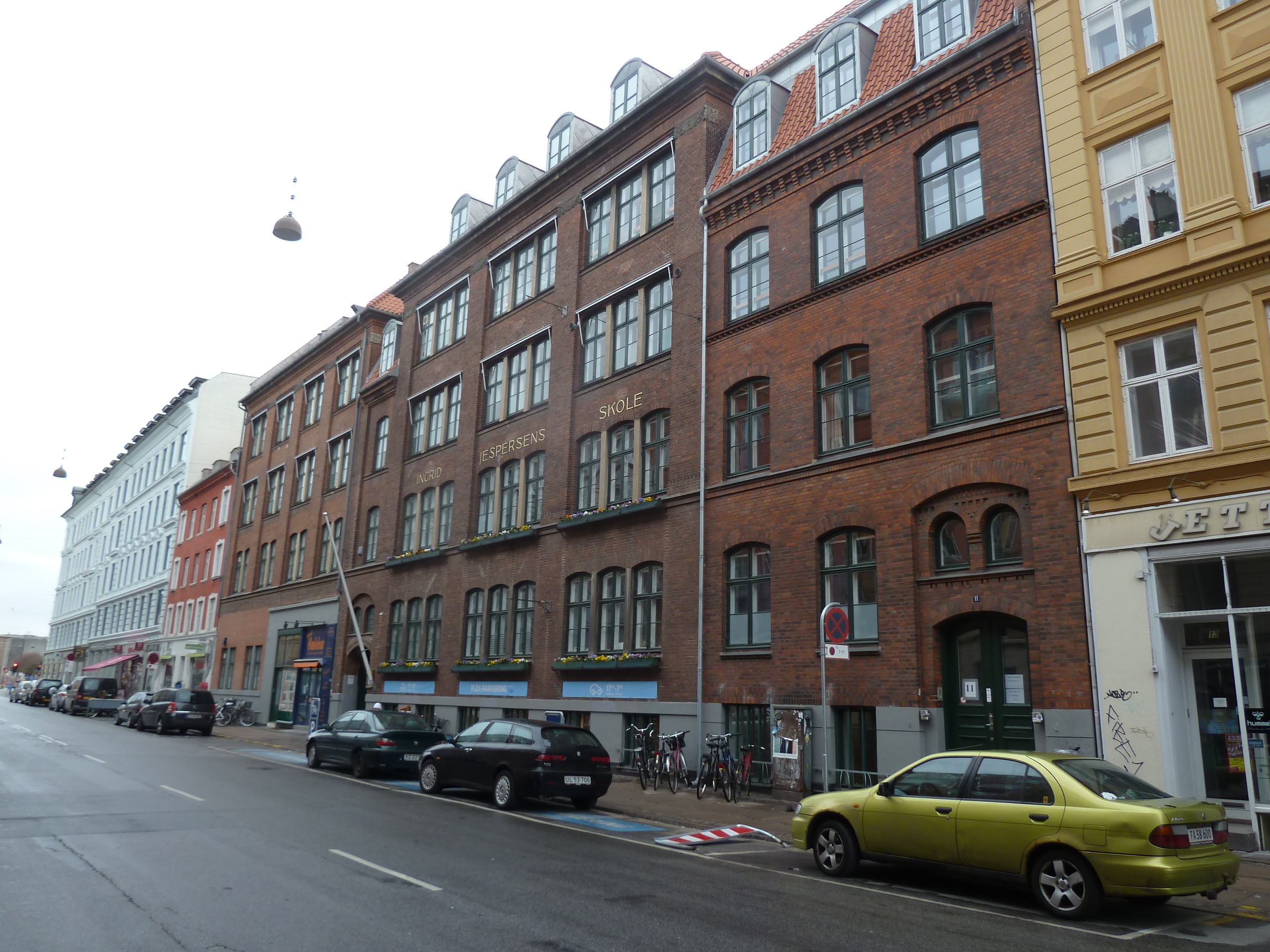

Location
- Østerbro, Copenhagen, Denmark
- Coordinates: 55.7003°N 12.5786°E

Information
- Type: Private primary school and gymnasium
- Founded: 1894
- Founder: Ingrid Jespersen
- Principal: Otto Strange Møller
- Grades: 0-3.G
- Enrollment: 726

Ingrid Jespersens Gymnasieskole is a private school located on Nordre Frihavnsgade in the Østerbro district of Copenhagen, Denmark.

== History ==
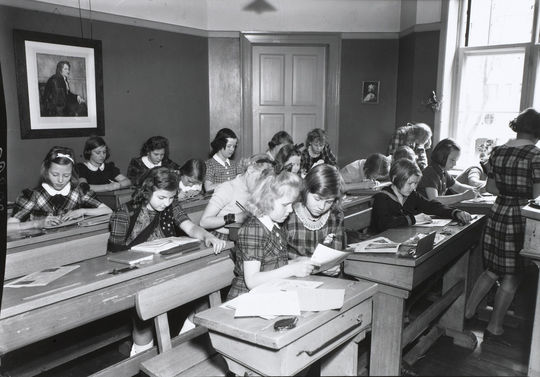
Riberhus (No. 31) corner with Randersgade

The school was established as a private primary school for girls by Ingrid Jespersen under the name Ingrid Jespersens Pigeskole in 1894. It was originally based in rented rooms in Gustav Adolph Hagemann's former house on Nordre Frihavnsvej (formerly Kalkbrænderivej, now Nordre Frihavnegade). The house was replaced by a new three-storey building at the same site in 1897. It was designed in the National Romantic style by A. M. Andersen.

In 1905, it was expanded to also include a gymnasium (High school). Ingrid Jespersen introduced sloyd laboratories for physics and chemistry classes in 1908, which was unusual for a girls' school at the time. The school was converted into a privately owned institution in 1912 and was expanded by the architect Kristoffer Varming.

In 1932, the school took over the neighbouring building at No. 9, the former Østerbro Police Station. The school was opened to male students in 1960.

As of today, the school remains one of Copenhagen's most popular private schools.

== Famous graduates ==
- 195?: Jane Aamund, author
- 1959: Tine Bryld, social worker, writer, radio personality
- 1975: Tøger Seidenfaden, journalist, editor-in-chief
- 1976: Lone Scherfig, film director
- 1982: Merete Ahnfeldt-Mollerup, architect
- 1985: Adam Price, screenwriter, television chef
- 1991: Mads Brügger, journalist
- 2023: Princess Isabella of Denmark (primary school only)
