= Randersgade =

Street in Copenhagen, Denmark

Randersgadeg
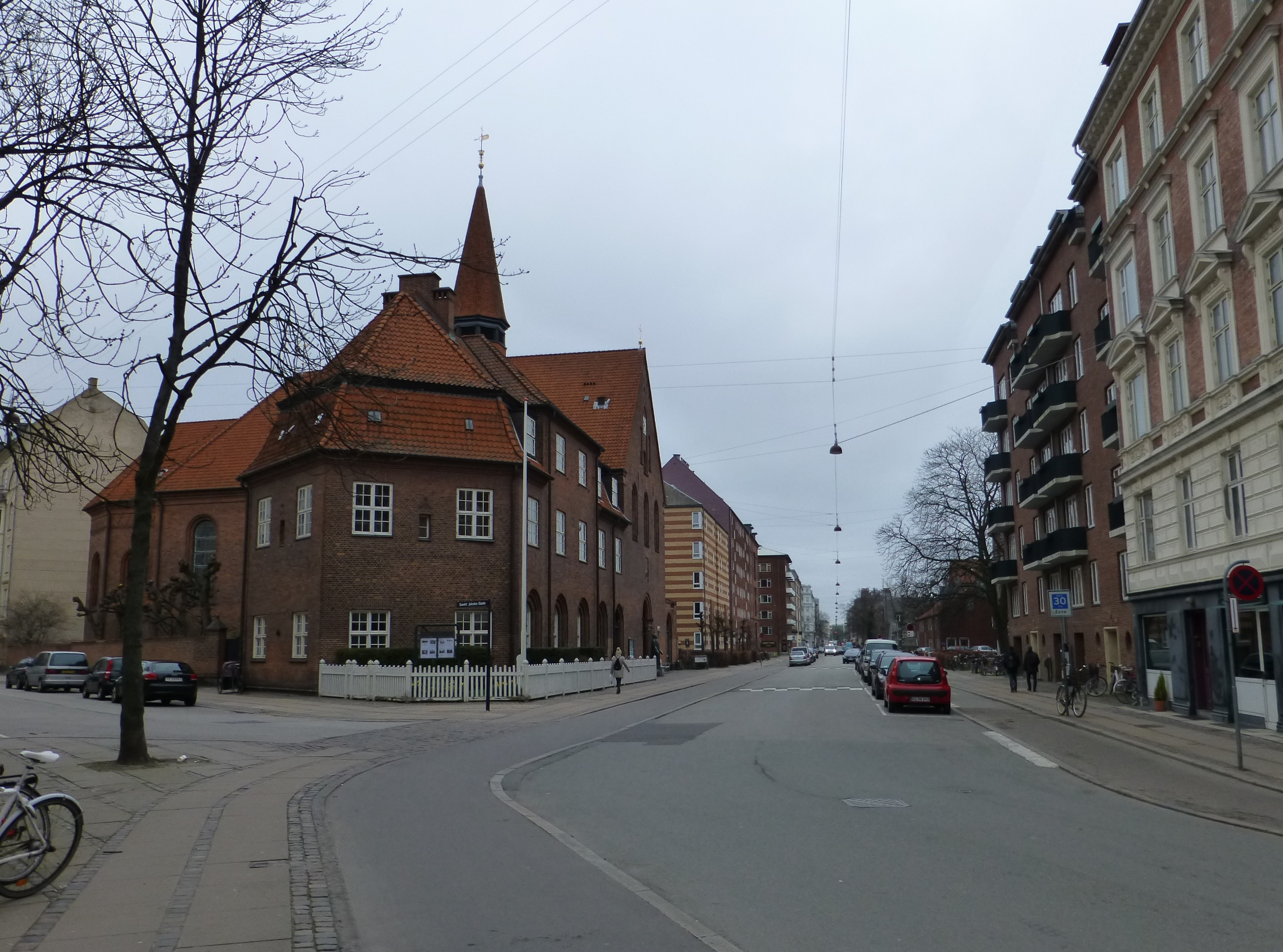
- Randersgade seen from Nordre Frihavnsgade
- Interactive map of Randersgadeg
- Length: 1,876 m (6,155 ft)
- Location: Copenhagen, Denmark
- Postal code: 2100
- Coordinates: 55°41′18.36″N 12°34′50.88″E

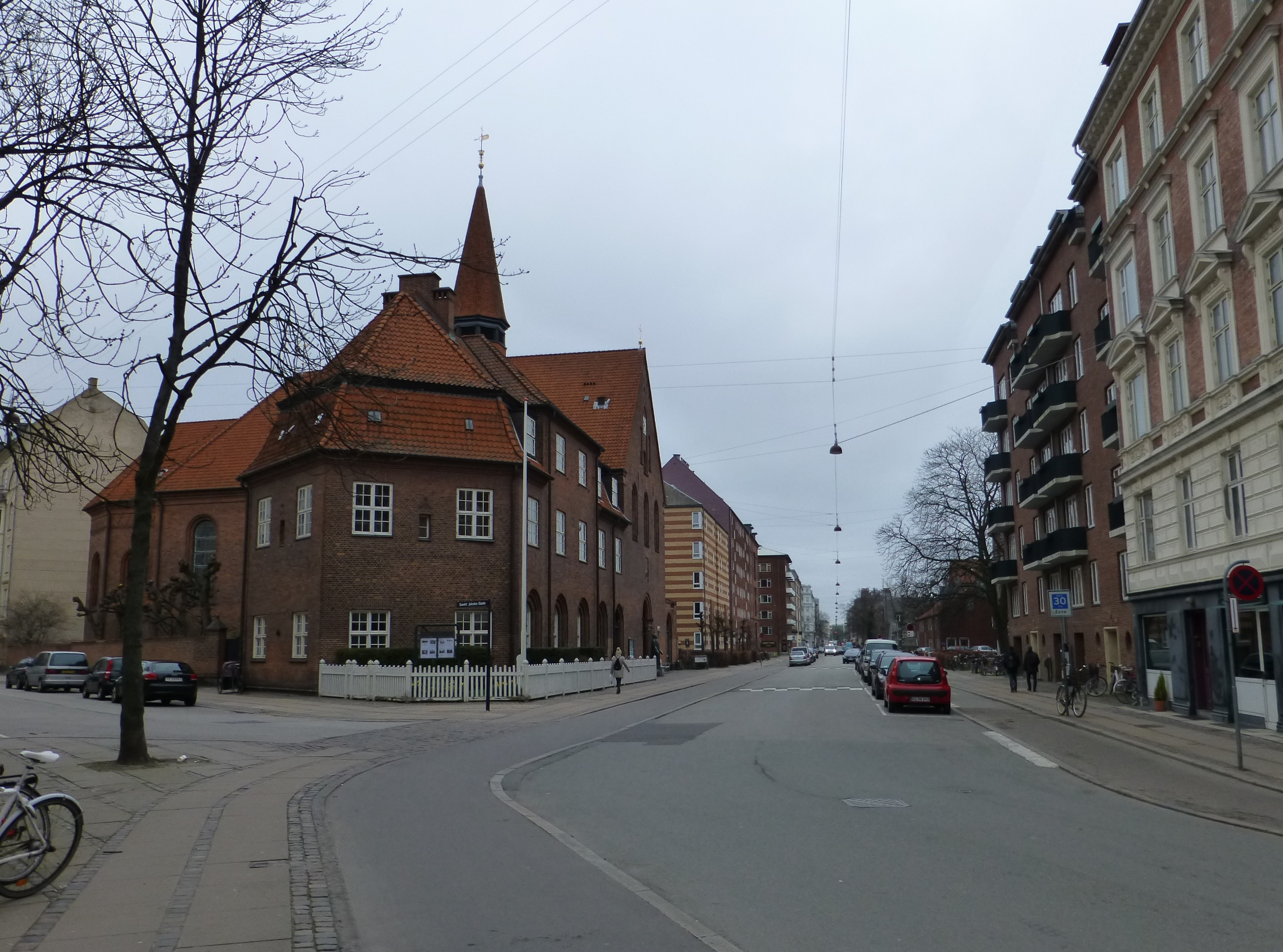
Randersgade viewed from Nordre Frihavnsgade

Randersgade (lit. 'Randers Street') is a street in the Østerbro district of Copenhagen, Denmark, linking Nordre Frihavnsgade in the south to Strandboulevarden in the north. The small square Bopas Plads is located on the corner of Randersgade with Viborggade.

== History ==
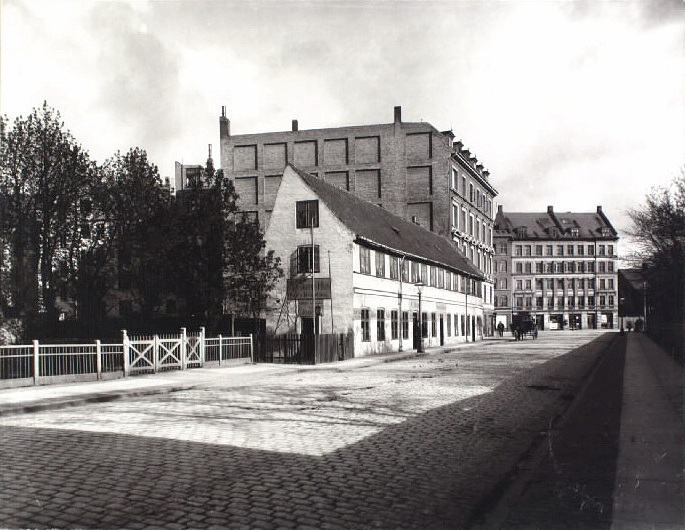
The southern part of Randersgade in 1899, looking south

Randersgade was originally called Kalkbrænderivej ("Lime Plant Road") and linked Trianglen with two lime plants. The name Randersgade was introduced for the section from Nøjsomhedsvej to Århusgade in 1886. The new name was in accordance with a naming scheme introduced by Thorvald Krak to name streets in the area after Danish market towns. In 1904, the name was also adopted for the section north of Vordingborggade, but the two sections were separated by Georg E. Mathiasen's machine factory which had opened in 1902, and were not connected until 1928 when the machine factory was demolished, the section from Nordre Frihavnsgade to Nøjsomhedsvej was also included in the street.

== Notable buildings and residents ==
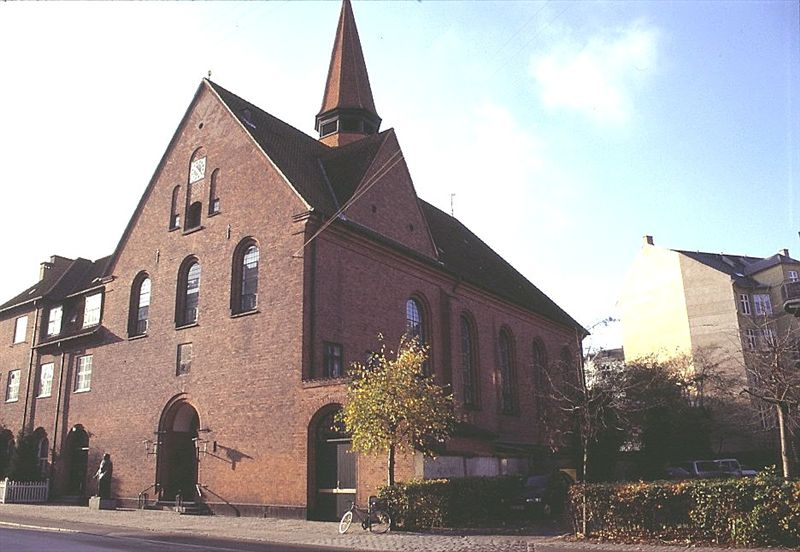
Luther Church

The Luther Church was built in 1914–18, according to a design by Martin Nyrop and Julius Smith. The name commemorates the 400-year anniversary of the beginning of the Lutheran reformation in 1918. Outside the church stands a statue of Martin Luther.

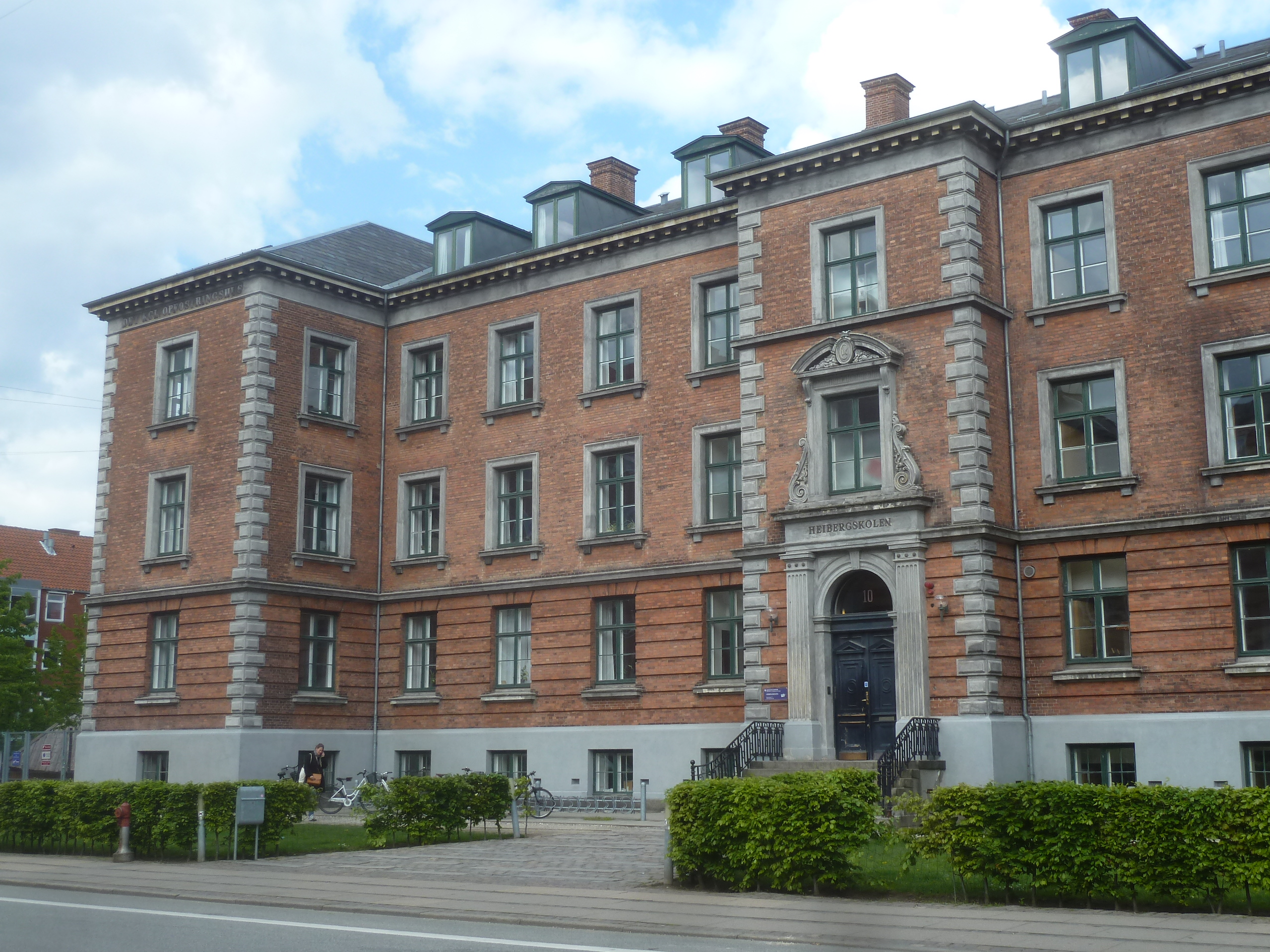
Heibergskolen School at No. 10

No. 10 was from 1880 home to the Royal Orphanage (Det Kongelige Opfostringshus). It is now home to Heibergskolen, a public primary school. Another public primary school, Randersgade School, is located at No. 38. It opened in the 1880s and was originally called Nøjsomhedsvejens Friskole. A third primary school, Vibenhus School, is located at the northern end of the street. However, its address is on Kertemindegade (No. 10). No. 66 (and Vordingborggade 15) is the former Technical Society's School. The building is from 1919 and was designed by Jesper Tvede.

== See also ==
- Århusgade
