= Landgreven =

Street and urban space in Copenhagen, Denmark

Landegreven
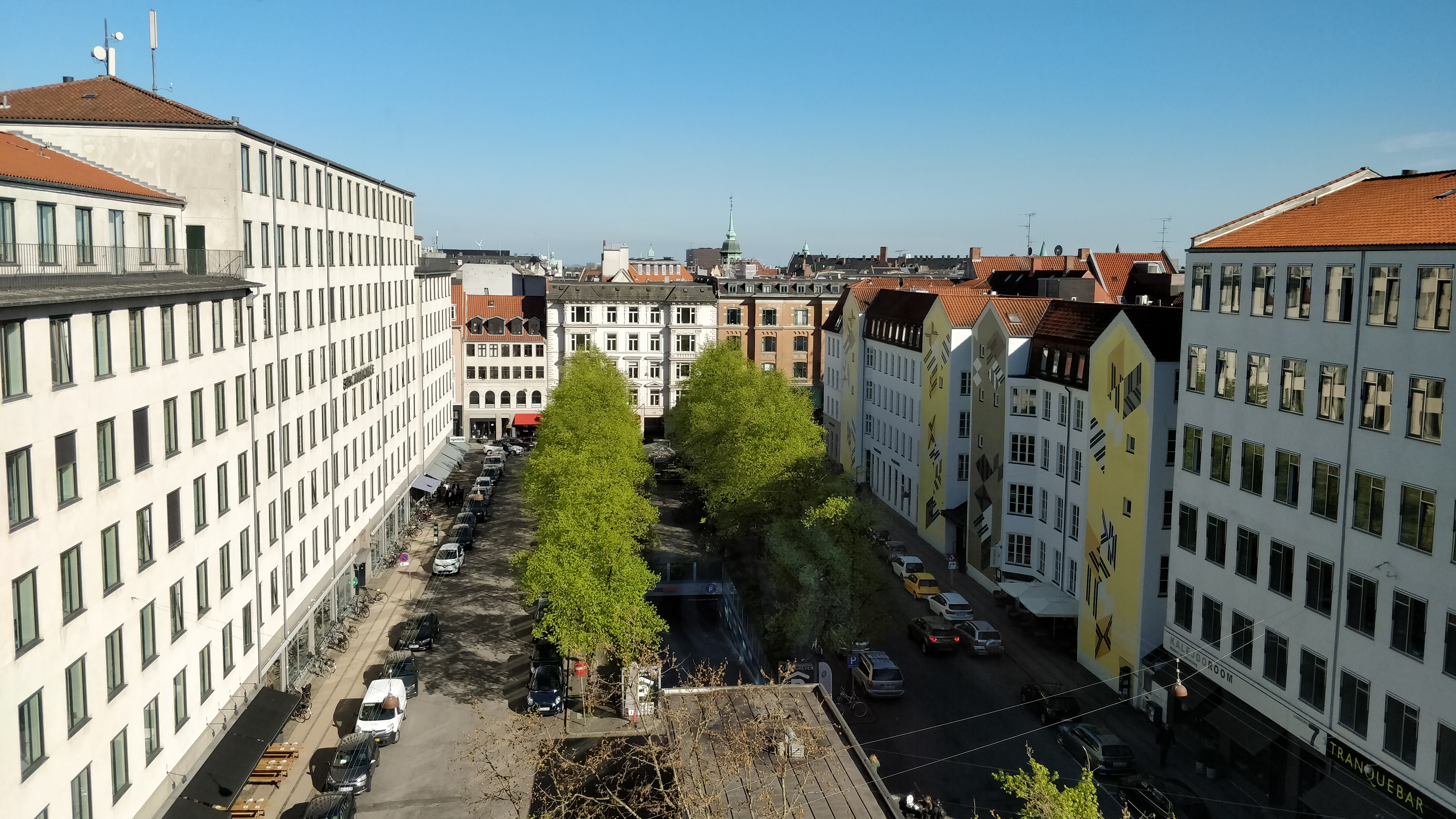
- A view down Åbenrå from the northern end of the street
- Length: 108 m (354 ft)
- Location: Indre By, Copenhagen, Denmark
- Postal code: 1301
- Nearest metro station: Kongens Nytorv
- Coordinates: 55°40′58.98″N 12°35′8.39″E

Landegreven is a street and urban space in central Copenhagen, Denmark, linking Borgergade and Store Kongensgade. It is the site of an underground parking facility. A former filling station facing Borgergade has been converted into a burger joint.

== History ==
Landgreven was created as part of an urban renewal project in the 1950s. The name refers to a private garden known as Landgreven af Hessen which was located at the site in the 18th century. The garden was used as an assistant cemetery of the graveyard of St. Nicolas' Church during the 1711 plague outbreak.

== Buildings ==
Gasoline Grill, a burger joint located in a former petrol station facing Borgergade, opened in 2016. In 2017, Bloomberg included it on a list of 27 of the best burgers in the world.

The building complex at Landgreven 3 / Store Kongensgade 27 dates from 1851. The building were refurbished by Tage Nielsens Tegnestue and Hans Munk Hansen (f.1929) for Boligfonden Bikuben. The minimalistic murals on the two gables that face Landereven were at the same event created by the artist Ole Schwalbe. The neighbouring building at Landgreven 7 / Borgergade 2-14 / Gothersgade 12-14 was built in 1943–1944 to design by Thorvald Dreyer.

Landgreven 2–6, an office building, is from 1960 and was designed by Ole Falkentorp. The building at Landgreven 10 is from 1958.
