= Grønnegade =

Street in Copenhagen, Denmark

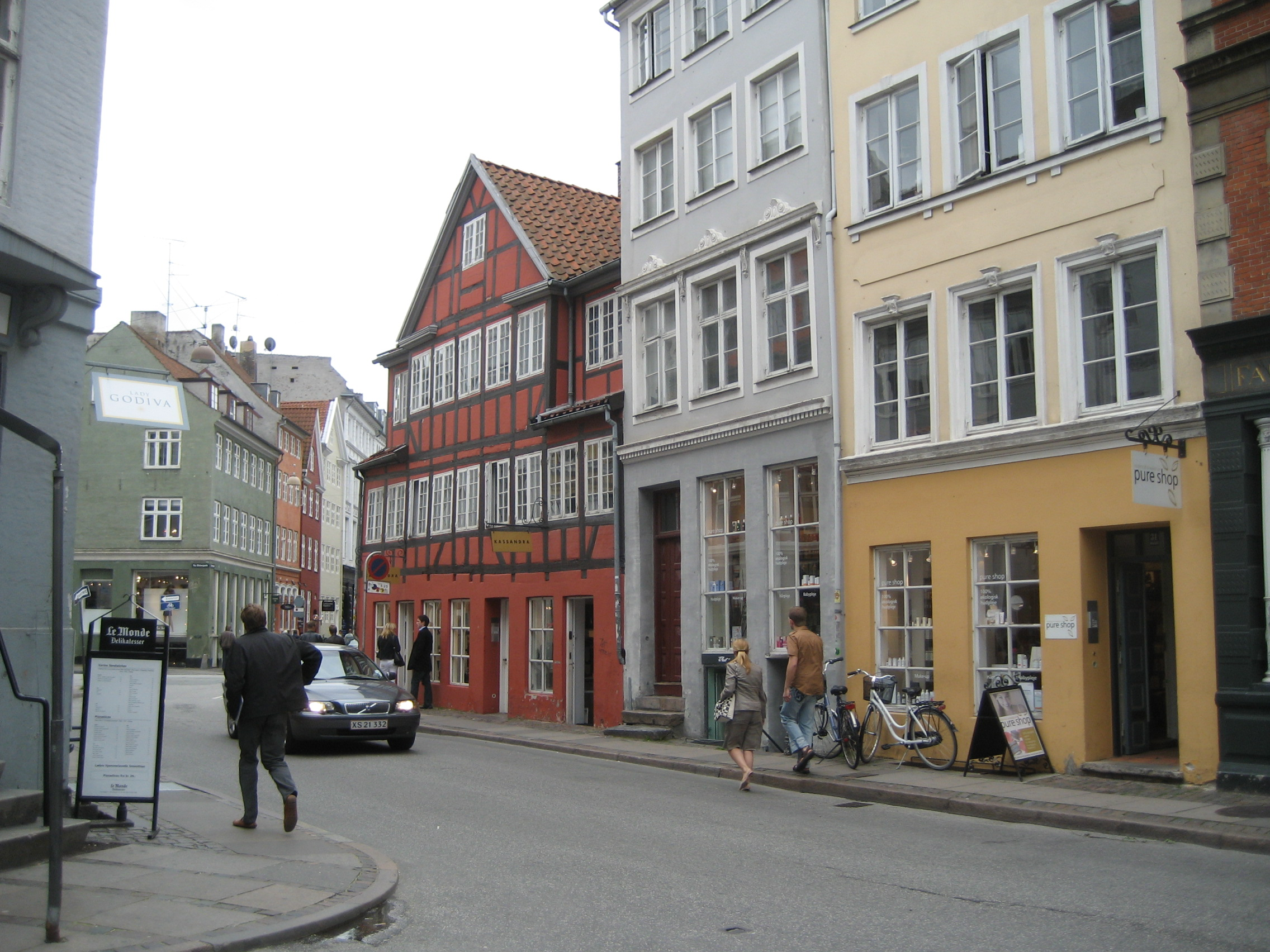
- Grønnegade at No. 27
- Length: 172 m (564 ft)
- Location: Indre By, Copenhagen, Denmark
- Postal code: 1107
- Nearest metro station: Kongens Nytorv
- Coordinates: 55°40′51.96″N 12°34′58.08″E

Grønnegade (lit.: Green Street) is a street in the Old Town of Copenhagen, Denmark, running northeast from Gammel Mønt to Gothersgade where it turns into Borgergade. It is part of Copenhagen's most exclusive shopping area, located northwest of Kongens Nytorv.

== History ==
The street name Grønnegade, then as Grønægade, is already registered in 1377, making it one of the oldest street names in Copenhagen which still exist today. In the Middle Ages, it was a grassy path that passed through an area with private gardens and undeveloped sites. From at least 1689, a closed passageway, later referred to as Smids Gang, extended from the north side of the street. Another narrow alleyway, Peder Madsens Gang, connected Grønnegade to Østergade. Its buildings were demolished in 1873 to make way for the wider street Ny Østergade.

== Notable buildings ==
The oldest buildings in the street are No. 26, 27 and 39 which date from before 1700, although they have all undergone later alterations.
