= Nyhavn 22 =

Historic building in Copenhagen, Denmark

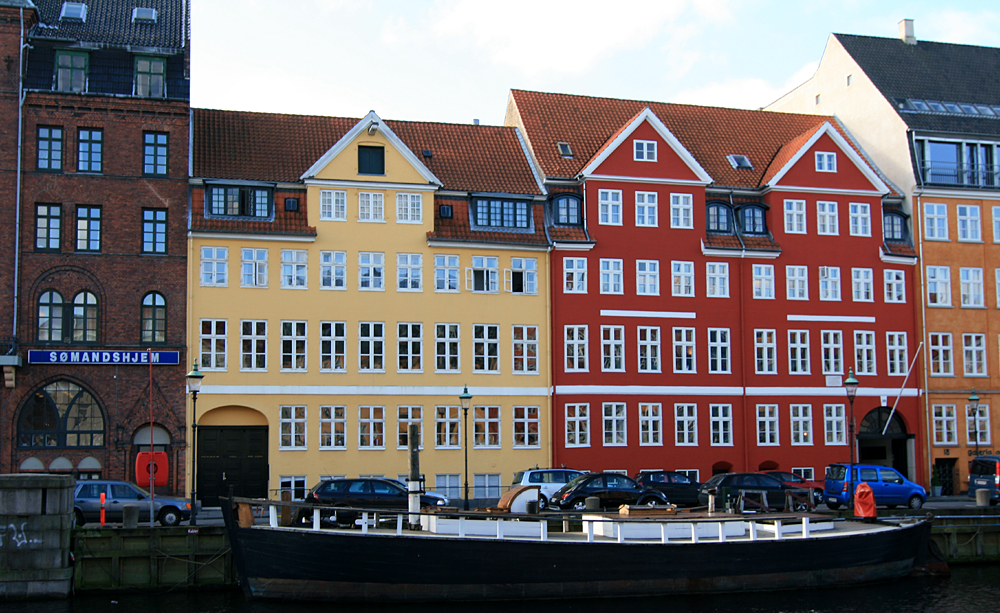
- Interactive map of the Nyhavn 22 area

General information
- Location: Copenhagen, Denmark
- Coordinates: 55°40′46.06″N 12°35′26.63″E
- Completed: 18th century

Nyhavn 22 is an 18th-century building overlooking the Nyhavn Canal in central Copenhagen, Denmark. In 1949, it was acquired by neighboring Hotel Bethel and used for an extension of the hotel. In the mid-19th century, it was owned by the businessman Mathias Wilheæl Saas. Other notable former residents include the medical doctor C.E. Fenger and painter Johan Rohde.

== History ==
=== Early history ===
The site was formerly part of Ulrik Frederik Gyldenløve's large property at the corner of Kongens Nytorv and Nyhavn. In Copenhagen's first cadastre from 1689 it was listed as No. 54 in St. Ann's East Quarter. On 5 January 1700. Gyldenløve ceded the property to dowager queen Charlotte Amalie. A narrow strip of land along the canal, from Charlottenborg to Møntgade (now part of Holbergsgade), was used for the construction of a row of very small, identical houses for low-ranking officials at the dowager queen's court. The houses were given numbers from 3 to 22.

In the new cadastre of 1756, No. 19–22 (now Nyhavn 22–24) were listed as No. 292–295 in St. Ann's East Quarter.

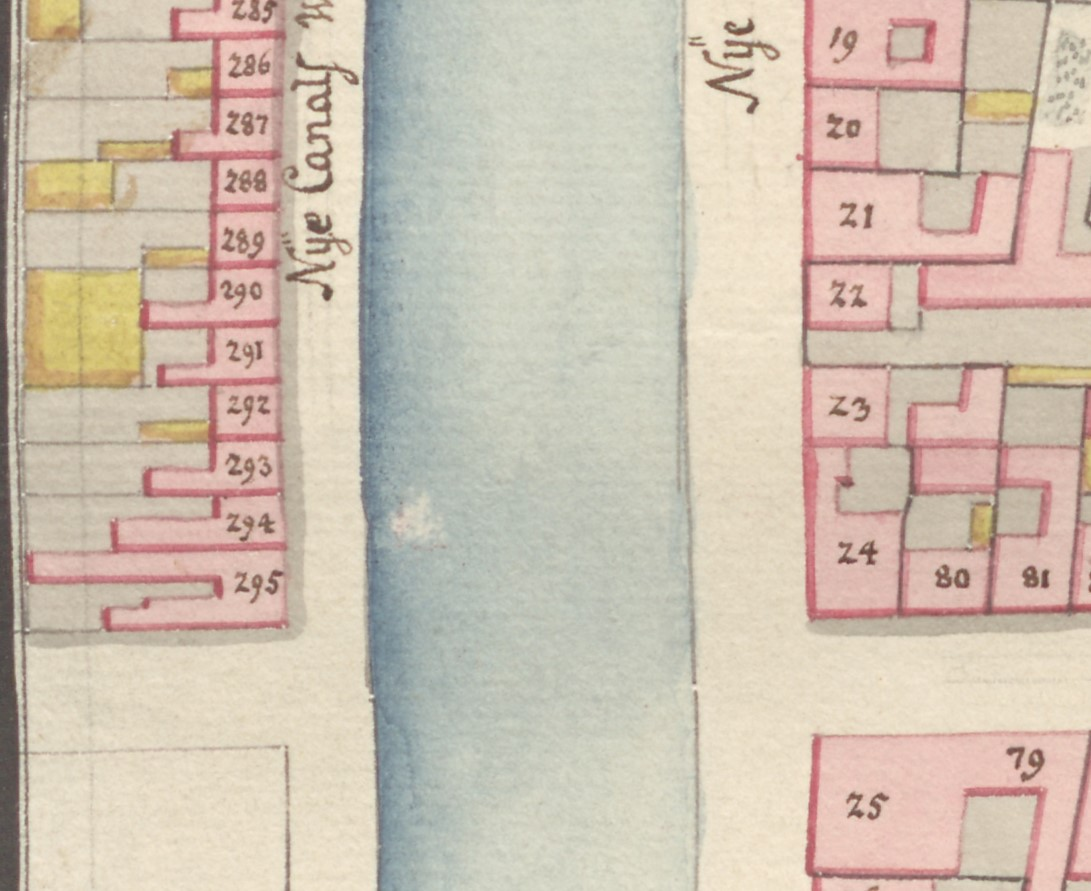
No. 278 seen in a detail from Christian Gedde's map of St. Ann's East Quarter, 1757

By royal resolution of 3 February 1770, it was decided to sell the houses at auction. The aim was to have them replaced by taller buildings that matched the houses on the other side of the canal and were more suitable for a location next to Kongens Nytorv. In conjunction with the sale, it was decided to widen the very narrow street along the canal. The properties were instead expanded with a strip of Charlottenborg gardens. The auction took place on 24 March 1770.

At the auction, No. 19–22 (aka No. 292–295) were sold to merchant (kommissinær) Peter Leegaard. He sold them to tanner Niels Kønsberg. By sales contract of 10 June 1778, he sold them to lace merchant Hans Jensen and master mason Samuel Bliclifeld. The present building on the site was constructed by them in 1779.

In the new cadastre of 1806, the property was listed as No. 282 in Eastern Quarter. It belonged to Andreas Espensen at that time, possibly the ship captain of the same name who owned Lille Strandstræde 16 on the other side of the canal.

=== Saas family ===
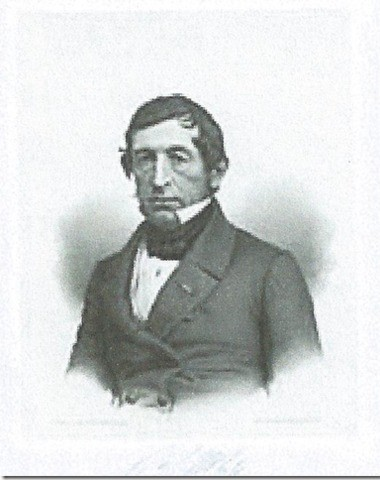
Mathias Wilhelm Sass

The property was later owned by Mathias Wilhelm Sass (1792–1856). Saas took citizenship as a wholesaler (grosserer) in 1824. Prior to that, he had worked as a warehouse manager for Andresen & Schmidt.

Saas lived in the building with his wife Emma Wilhelmine Saas (née Rosenkilde, 1809–1883), daughter of sailing master (styrmand) and later lieutenant Jens Jacob Rosenkilde (1770–1811) and Jensine Palæmona Aagaard (1786–1826). His trading firm M. W. Sass & Sønner was also based in the building.

The medical doctor C.E. Fenger (1814–1884) was a tenant in the building from 1847 to 1851.

Mathias Wilhelm Sass died on 16 January 1866. At the time of the 1880 census, Nyhavn 22 was home to 14 residents. Emma Saas resided on the first floor with her housekeeper Karen Vilhelmine Birch and two maids. Magdalene Andrea Tuxen (1813-1881) and Louise Amalie Tuxem (1831–1917), two music teachers (daughters of Peder Mandrup Tuxen and Elisabeth Marie Tuxen), resided on the second floor with one maid. Rasmus Larsen Petersen, a watchman associated the Nyhavn Bridge, resided in the basement with his wife Ane Petersen (née Mortensen) and their five children (aged one to 12).

Johannes Petersen's flag factory was located in the building in 1888. The artist Johan Rohde (1856–1935) resided in the building from 1888 to 1900.

=== 20th century ===
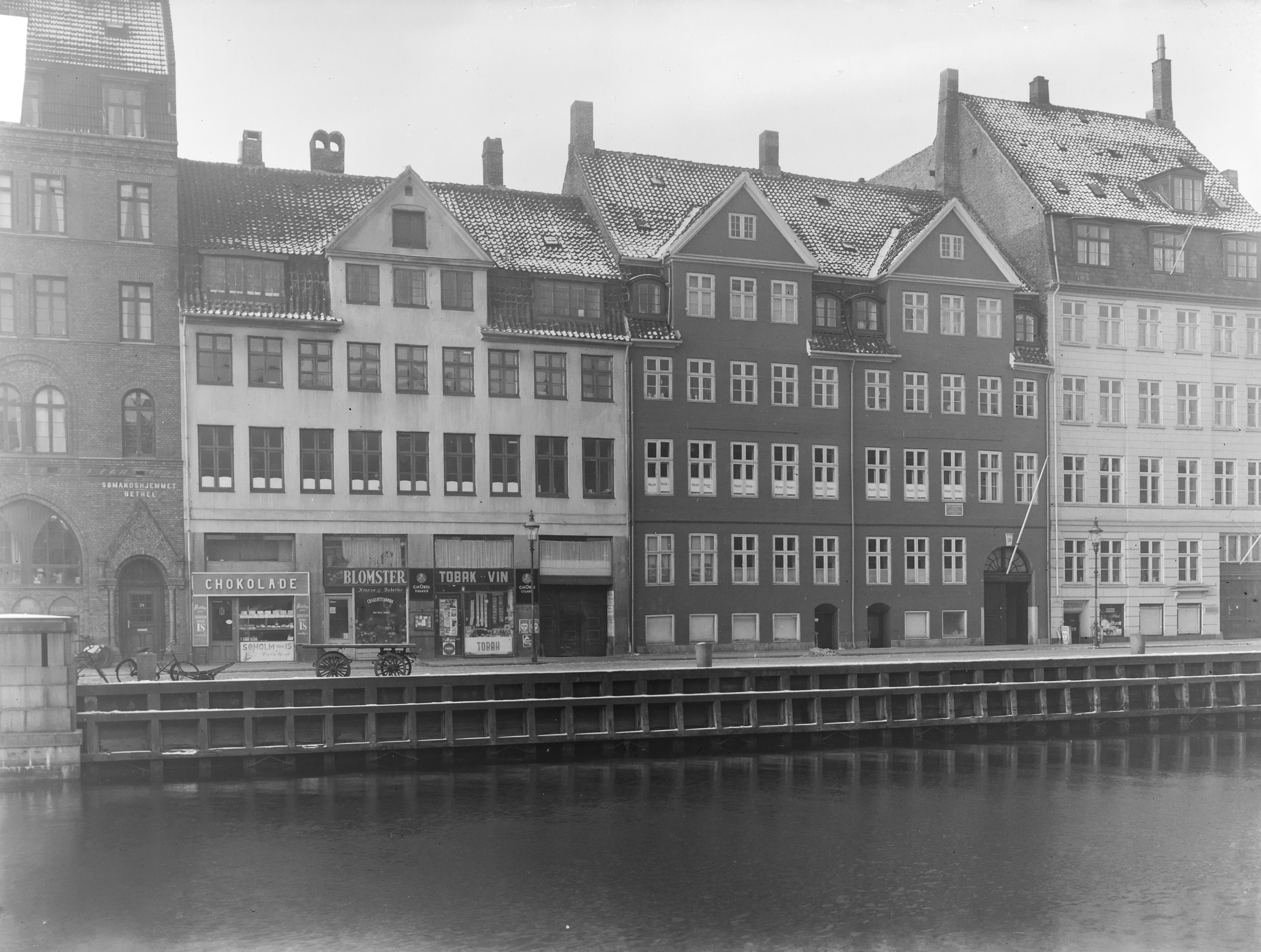
Nyhavn 22 in 1950

Ax. Petersen & Co. was based in the building. The founder Axel Wilhelm Petersen (1868–1921) died in the building on 6 January 1921. By 1950, Ax. Petersen & Co. had moved to Vesterbrogade 30.

In 1949, Nyhavn 22 was acquired by Hotel Bethel. In 1951–52, it was adapted for use as a hotel building by the architects Peter Koch (1905–1980) and Esben Klint (1915–1969). In 1953, their renovation received an award from the City of Copenhagen.

== Architecture ==
Nyhavn 22 is a nine bays wide building constructed with three storeys over a walk-out basement. The facade is crowned by a three-bay gabled wall dormer. A gateway is located in the bay farthest to the left.
