= Knabrostræde 25 =

Listed building in Copenhagen

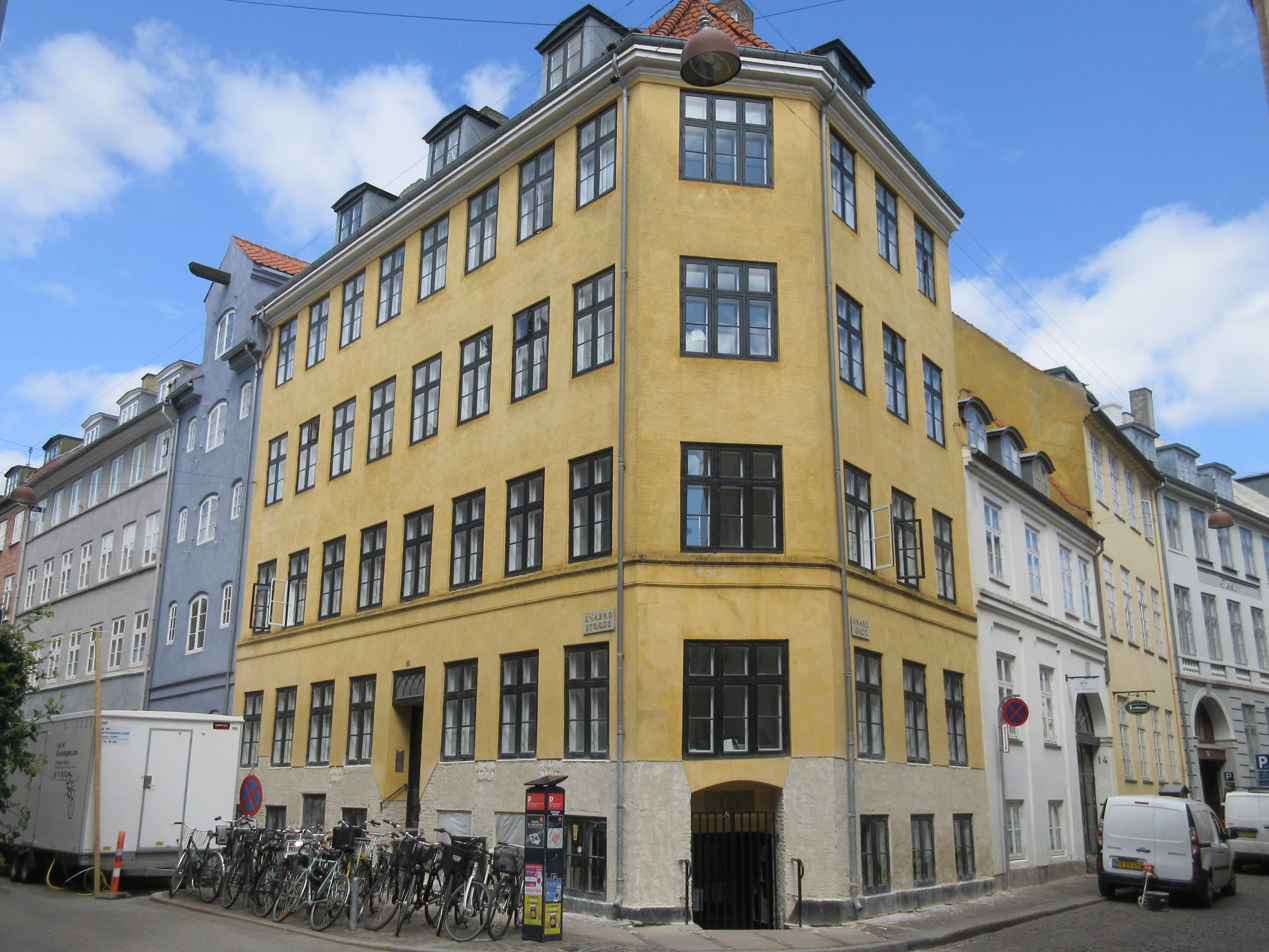
- Interactive map of the Knabrostræde 25 area

General information
- Architectural style: Neoclassical
- Location: Copenhagen, Denmark
- Coordinates: 55°40′36.66″N 12°34′33.64″E
- Completed: 1838

Knabrostræde 25 is an 1830s apartment building situated at the slightly acute-angled corner of Knabrostræde and Snaregade, close to Gammel Strand, in the Old Town of Copenhagen, Denmark. It was listed in the Danish registry of protected buildings and places in 1945.

== History ==
=== Site history, 1689–1834 ===
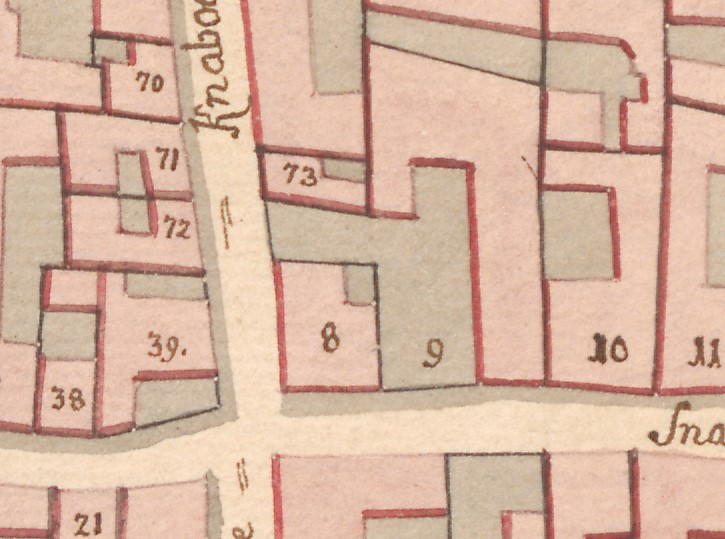
No. 8 seen in a detail from Christian Gedde's map of Snaren's Quarter, 1757

The site was formerly made up of three small properties. One of them was listed in Copenhagen's first cadastre of 1689 as No. 9 in Snaren's Quarter, owned by tailor Jens Nielsen. Another one was listed as No. 10, owned by stopper Laurids Jensen. The third one was listed as No. 77, owned by Icelandic merchant Jens Hansen. The three properties were later merged into a single property, possibly after the Copenhagen Fire of 1728.

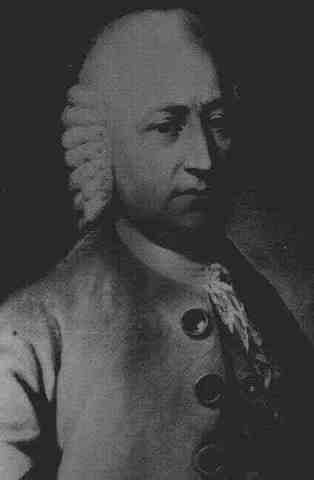
Jacob Lobeck

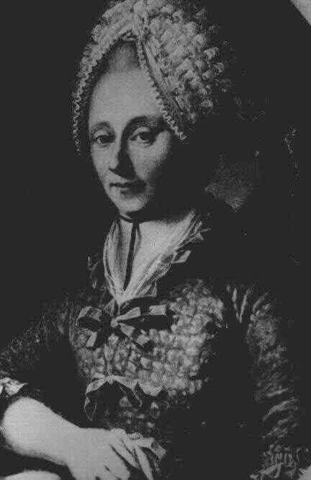
Catharina Lobeck

The property was at some point acquired by master baker Jacob Lobeck. His property was listed in the new cadastre of 1756 as No. 8 in Snaren's Quarter. No. 205 in the West Quarter (Stormgade) was also owned by Lobeck in 1756. Lobeck had come to Copenhagen from Meldorf in Schleswig-Holstein. His first wife was Anna Maria Olsdatter Børresen, who bore him eight children. He was after her death in around 1754 the second time married to Catharina Lobeck (1727-1805), widow of hørkræmmer Lorentz Reimer (-1771).

Lobeck would later buy Einert Sivertsen's property in Østergade (No. 54 in Købmager Quarter, now Østergade 16). He had his son-in-law Erik Pauelsen decorate the walls with murals with motifs from the Bible.

No. 8 in Snaren's Quarter was not registered with any residents in the 1787 census.

No. 8 in Snaren's Quarter was again not listed with any residents in the 1801 census. The property was listed in the new cadastre of 1806 as No. 7 in Snaren's Quarter. It belonged to G. L. Becker at that time.

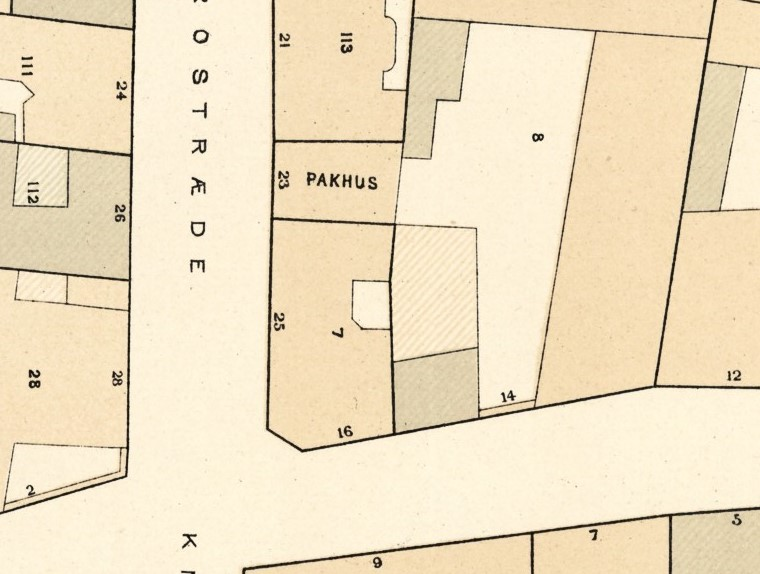
Knabrostræde 25 seen in a detail from Berggreen's cadastral map of Snaren's Quarter, 1884

=== The new building, 1838–1900 ===
The present building on the site was constructed in 1838 for carpenter (tømmersvend) Johan Philip Petersen. The new building contained two small apartments on each floor.

The property was home to 31 residents in eight households at the 1840 census. Jens Peder Hansen, a mechanician, resided on the ground floor with his wife Sophie Magdelene Schæbel, his mother Bodil Petersen and one maid. Maria Bødkjer, a widow, resided on the first floor to the right with her 26-year-old son Peter Vallentin and her 24-year-old daughter Sophie Vallentin. Maria Larsen, another widow, resided on the first floor to the left with her 19-year-old daughter Hermannine Larsen. Frederik Bastian, a master tailor, resided on the second floor to the right with his wife Karen Havtorn and their five children (aged one to 13). Magdelene Palle, a widow, resided on the second floor to the left with her 31-year-old daughter Anne Gissing and the 23-year-old student Wilhelm Øvere. Hermannine Huvitfelt, Maria Meier and Maria Hansen—three young, unmarried women employed with needlework—resided on the third floor to the right with two student lodgers Charl Ludvig Dorn and Hans Satterup. Frederik Brackhoff, a portrait painter, resided on the third floor to the left with his wife Ane Lind and one maid. Ole Christensen Giede, a workman, resided in the basement with his wife Anne Rasmusen, workman Ole Hansen Østerby and Østerby's wife Anne Christensen.

The property was home to 18 residents in seven small households at the 1860 census. Pehr Daniel Svenson, a barkeeper, resided in the basement with his wife Anna Sophie Svenson and one maid. The other tenants were three widows employed with needlework, a policeman, a brick-layer and a workman.

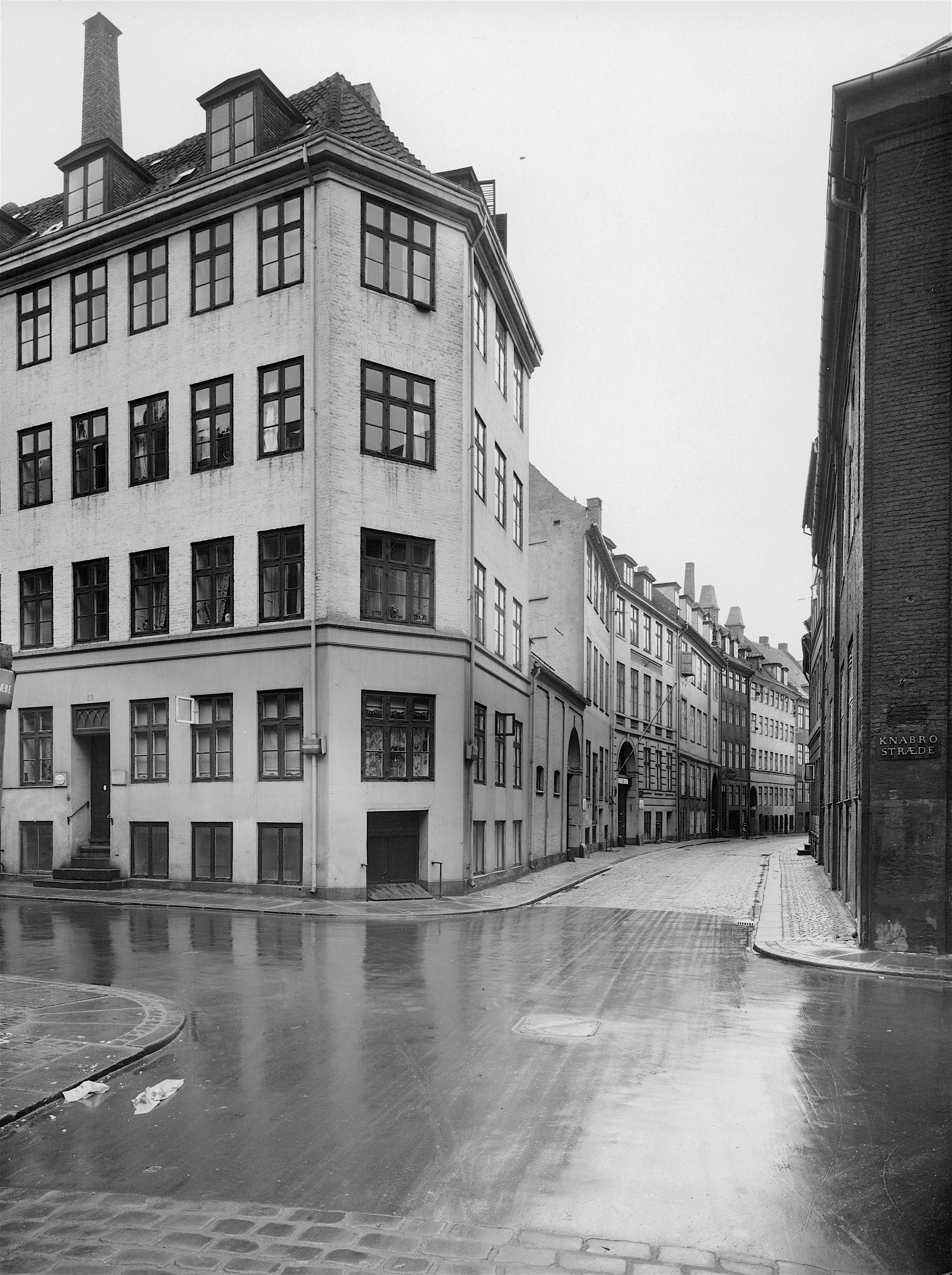
Knabrostræde 25

The property was home to 36 residents at the 1860 census. Andreas Henrick Christian Schebel, a master shoemaker, resided in one of the ground-floor apartments with his wife Susanne M. Schebel and one maid. Sophie Magalene Hansen, a widow, resided in the other ground-floor apartment with her daughter (aged 17) and two sons (aged eight and 19). Johan Lauritz Glæsner, an official in Hof- og Stadsretten, resided in one of the first-floor apartments to the left with his wife Marie Glæsner, their two sons (aged 12 and 17) and his mother Maren Gramelstorff. Emil A. Seitzberg, a master chairmaker, resided in the other first-floor apartment with his wife Vilhelmine Caroline Seitzberg and the apprentice Peter Ludvig Vilhelm Viborg. Lauritz Jensen Rosendahl, a courier, resided in one of the second-floor apartments with his wife Fredericke Rosendahl and their two-year-old daughter. Johan Friederich Holger Jacobsen, a royal equestrian escort (forrider), resided in one of the three remaining apartments with his wife Dorothea Augusta Jacobsen, their two-year-old daughter Johanne Sophie Josephine Jacobsen and one lodger (shoemaker). Søren Hansen, a royal concierge, resided in another apartment with his wife Nicoline Frederike Hansen. Ida Emilie Colts, Wilhelmine Caroline Colts and Conradine Josefine Colts—three sisters employed with needlework—resided in another apartment with one lodger. Juliane Constanze Smith, a widow employed with needlework, resided in the basement with her four children (aged nine to 26). Johan Frederik Goldenbaum, a miller (møllersvend), resided in the basement with his wife Johanne Jacobine Goldenbaum and one maid.

=== 20th century ===
The building was listed in the Danish registry of protected buildings and places in 1945.

== Architecture ==
Knabrostræde 25 is a slightly acute-angled corner building constructed in brick with four storeys above a walk-out basement. It has an eight-bays-long facade towards Knabrostræde, a three-bays-long facade towards Snaregade and a chamfered corner. The facade is plastered and yellow-painted, with green-painted window-frames and doors. It is finished with a cornice band above the ground floor and a white-painted cornice below the roof. The main entrance is located in the fourth bay from the corner in Knabrostræde. One of the two basement entrances is located in the corner bay. The other one, in Snaregade, is closed by green-painted wooden places. The red tile roof is sloped towards the street and a mansard roof towards the courtyard. The roof ridge is pierced by two chimneys. A side wing extends from the rear side of the building along one side of the central courtyartd. The rear side of the building (towards the courtyard) is also plastered and yellow-painted.

== Today ==
The property is now owned by E/F Knabrostræde 25. The two first-floor and swecond-floor apartments have been merged into a single apartment on each of the two floors.
