= Pan Club Copenhagen =

Defunct gay club in Copenhagen, Denmark

Coordinates: 55°40′41.87″N 12°34′27.42″E

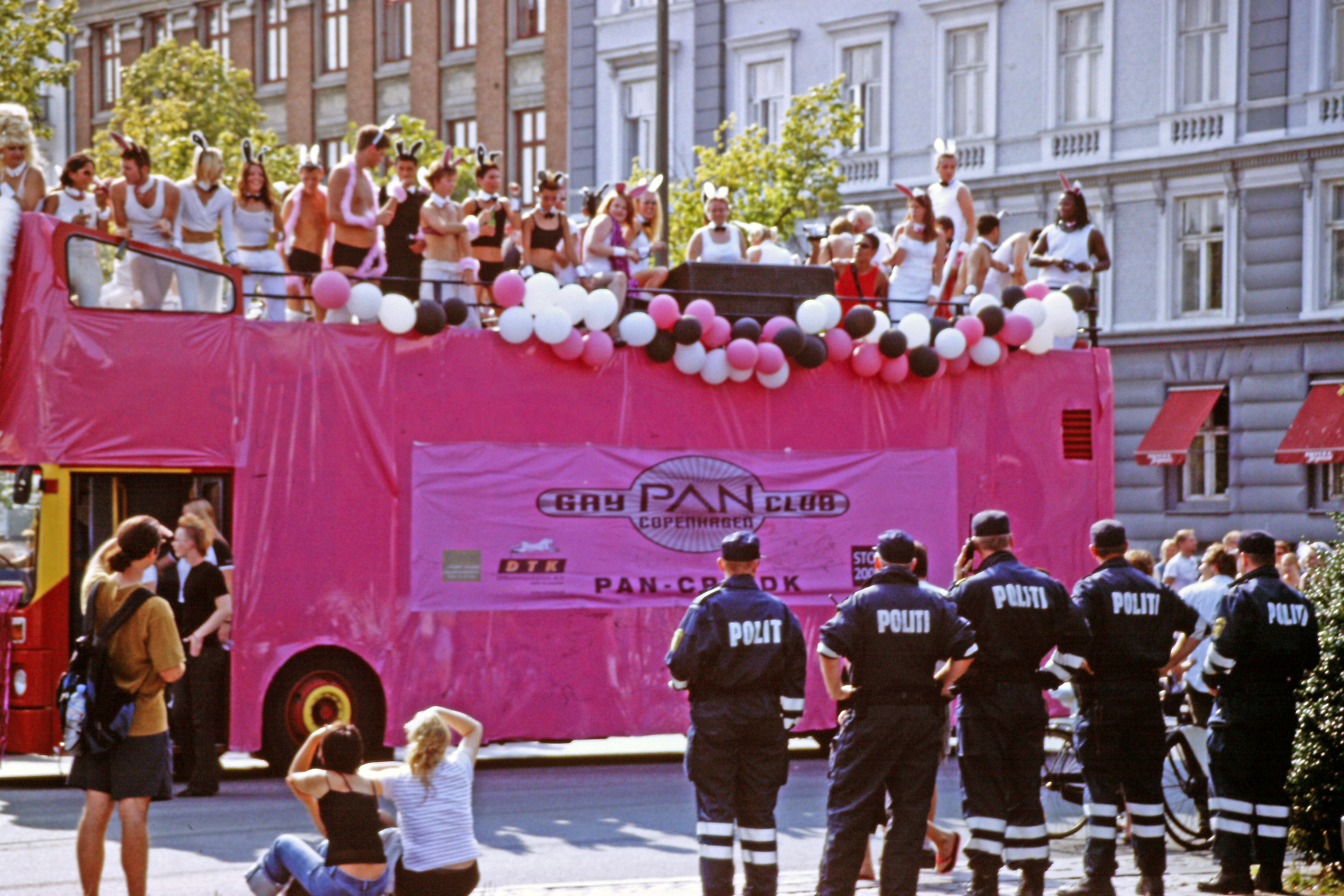
The Pan Club float at the 2002 Mermaid Pride parade

Pan Club Copenhagen (often just referred to as Pan) was a gay club in central Copenhagen, Denmark which closed in 1994 after having been in operation on various locations in Copenhagen since 1970. However already in 1996 private owners opened a club at the former location with the same name and concept, successfully reviving the club until 2007.

Pan was one of Europe's largest gay clubs and the biggest in Copenhagen. It attracted a large number of people, particularly in the weekends with Saturday being the biggest night. While people of almost all age groups came to the club, it was most popular with younger gay men and lesbians. It also attracted a heterosexual crowd, and in periods it was one of the more fashionable places to go in Copenhagen with many celebrities visiting the club. The club was originally run and owned by LBL (now, LGBT Denmark), the Danish national organization for gays, lesbians and bisexuals. The place has since become a commercial venue and has changed owners several times. Most recently, it was taken over by three men, Munir, Rico and Sadi in 2005 until it closed in 2007.

Located at Knabrostræde 3 in the city center, the club had four floors (although not all floors were open at all times) for a total of 2 dance floors and 6 bars. The ground floor featured the cloakroom. The first floor (also known as Pan One) played mostly dance music. The second floor (Pan Two) featured primarily new and old pop music. The third floor featured a karaoke bar and a view over the dance floor of Pan Two. There was also a mezzanine between the first and second floors, offering a view over Pan One along with a sitting area. In the summer, one could sit in the open-air yard outside the club. Britney Spears visited the club in 2004 the night before her concert in Copenhagen.

During the last years of the club's operation, the fraction of heterosexuals attending the club steadily increased. This generated negative comments from members of the homosexual crowd who, while generally being welcome to heterosexuals, also wanted to keep the place a gay club. In Denmark it is illegal to restrict access to a club to people of a particular sexual orientation. In September 2006 the club announced a new system that would require guests to show a member card before being allowed to enter the club. The member card was to be ordered from the club website. Guests would be admitted if accompanied by a card holder and tourists would be allowed to enter without a card. The club owners cited a growing number of heterosexual people entering the club just to get a look at the homosexuals, as the motivation for this measure. The member card requirement was put into effect on April 1, 2007. However, a few days later the club announced that it was shutting down, citing a decreasing number of visitors as the reason. April 14, 2007 was the last night the club was open to the public.

In the building that used to host PAN, a new nightclub, K3 opened in April 2007. It does not cater specifically to the homosexual community but describes itself as gay-friendly. In August 2008, it was reported that the K3 club would be hosting gay parties under the name "PAN retro", with the first party planned for December 28, 2008.

== Chain of the Original PAN Clubs in Denmark ==
LBL's division in Aarhus, followed in 1976 with PAN Club Aarhus, and throughout the 1980s several more followed in its peak in the early 1990s having 6 nightclubs in total, most located in Jutland. During a receivership in 1994, PAN A/S was forces to sell all their estate property and to lease or sell all of their night clubs to avoid bankruptcy. Unfortunately the only night club that was saved was the one in Aarhus, that continued until 2006, where it had to close because of competition from especially one larger and more modern nightclub in Aarhus, also aiming at the LGBT audience. In 1996, 2 year after the closure of the PAN Club in Copenhagen, a man named Thorstein Viggoson opened a new night club with the name "PAN Club" at the same location of the former PAN Club in Copenhagen successfully recreating the image of the former PAN Club, however it closed in 2007 only a year after the last original PAN Club in Aarhus. In 2009 private owners opened a new LGBT nightclub in Aarhus inspired by Pan Club in Aarhus and Copenhagen, called G-Bar (short for Gay-Bar) with a smilair logo as the Pan Clubs. The G-bar nightclub is still open as of 2022.

== See also ==
- List of LGBTQ bars
