= Johan Rohde =

Danish painter, lithographer and designer

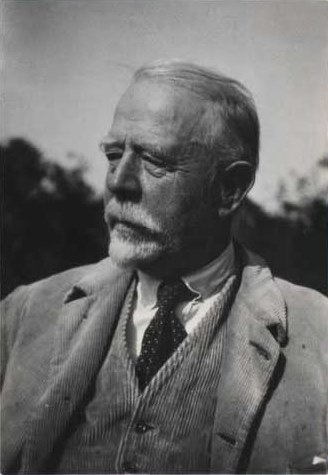
- Rohde in 1934
- Born: Johan Gudmann Rohde; 1 November 1856
- Died: 18 February 1935 (aged 78)
- Education: Kunstnernes Studieskole
- Known for: Painting, lithographyand design
- Awards: Thorvaldsen Medal; 1934

Johan Gudmann Rohde (1 November 1856 – 18 February 1935) was a Danish painter, lithographer and designer. He was the principal founder of Den Frie Udstilling, established in 1891 to allow artists to exhibit works which did not fall within the Academy's selection criteria.

== Early life ==
Rhode was born on 1 November 1856 in Randers, the son of merchant Hermann Peter Rohde (1827–97) and Ane Marie Schmidt (1832–1915). He matriculated from grammar school in 1875 and first studied medicine before deciding to turn to art and painting. After studying privately under Wenzel Tornøe, he entered the Academy in 1882. Unhappy with the institution's refusal to accept modern trends, he left less than a year later together with a number of other students. Thereafter he studied at the newly established Kunstnernes Studieskole (Students' School of Study) under Laurits Tuxen and P.S.Krøyer (1883–1886).

== Career ==
Rohde first exhibited at Charlottenborg's spring exhibition in 1888 with an everyday scene: En Beværtningshave i Udkanten af København (A Tavern Garden on the Outskirts of Copenhagen). When his paintings were later refused by the Academy, together with those of Vilhelm Hammershøi, Fritz Syberg, Joakim Skovgaard and Julius Paulsen, in 1888 he and Rasmus Christiansen arranged an exhibition of refused works in their studio. In 1890, with J.F. Willumsen, Hammershøi, Harald and Agnes Slott-Møller and Christian Mourier-Petersen, he established Den Frie Udstilling where he exhibited throughout his life.

Rohde travelled widely, not only exhibiting his works, but playing a key role for Danish art until 1914 by following news trends, making new contacts and writing carefully formulated articles in the Danish newspapers. He had eye for works of value, buying a painting by Van Gogh in Paris in 1892 (now in the Ny Carlsberg Glyptotek. He also arranged an exhibition of Van Gogh's works in Den Frie in 1893. His own works from the 1890s are influenced by Symbolism, especially his portraits.

== Design ==
=== Furniture and silver ===
Rohde also played an important part in the development of Danish craftsmanship with his high-quality silver designs (for Georg Jensen as well as furniture in both classical and Japanese styles.

Rohde found his way into the applied artys when he began designing furniture and silver for his own home. These were produced by some of the leading Danish workshops of his time. In 1906, he thus commissioned Georg Jensen to execute some silver based on jis own drawings. Impressed with what he saw, Jensen then commissioned Rohde to create some designs for his workshop. Rohde was initially also working with other silvermsiths until Jensen secured an exclusive contract with him in 1914. Among his most significant designs for Georg Jensen are the Acorn (Konge, 1915) and Schroll (Sagam 1927) flatware patterns and the Cosmos yea and coffee service (1915).

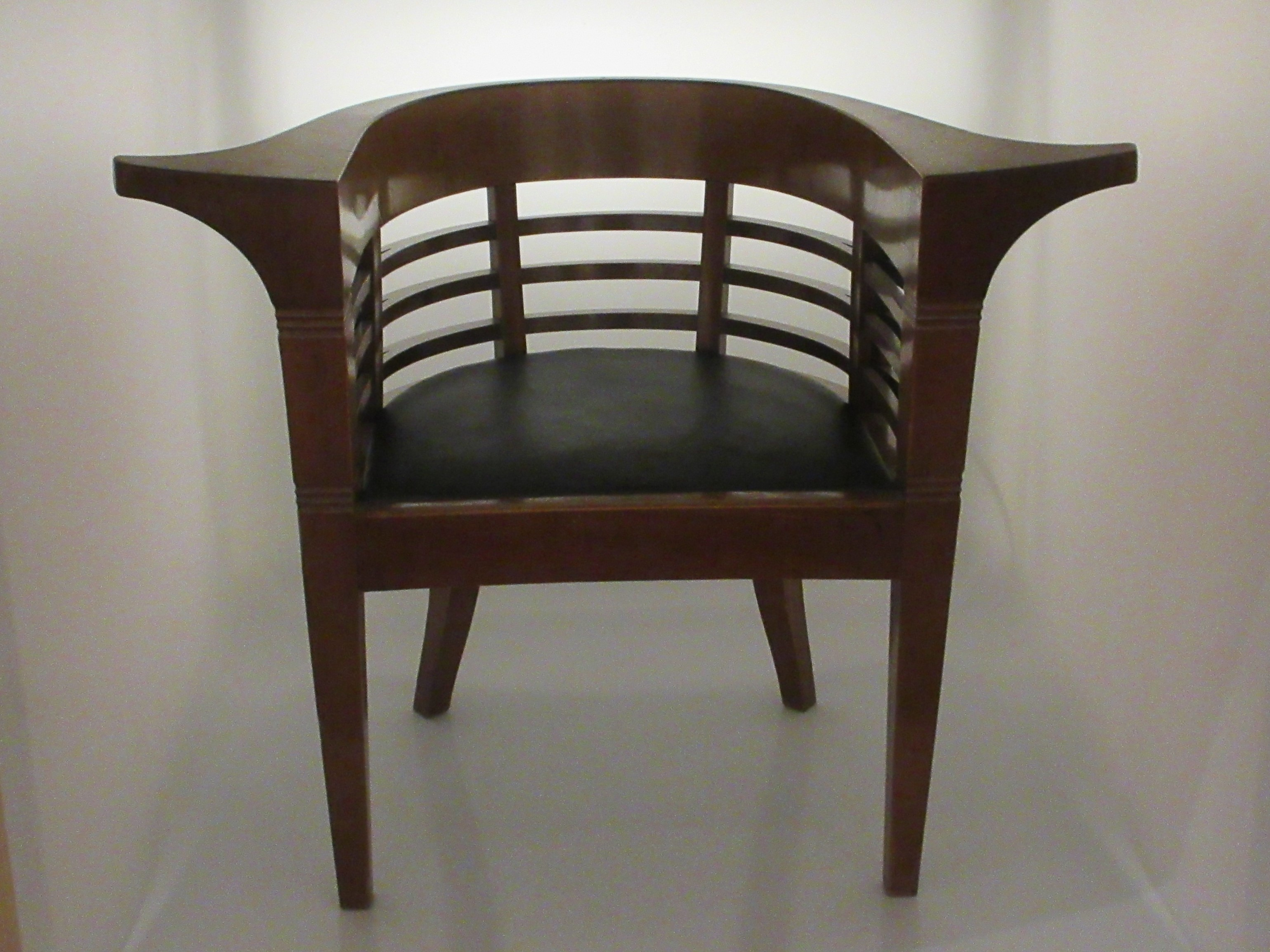
Chair designed by Rode in 1898 for Dr. Alfred Pers now on display in the Danish Design Museum

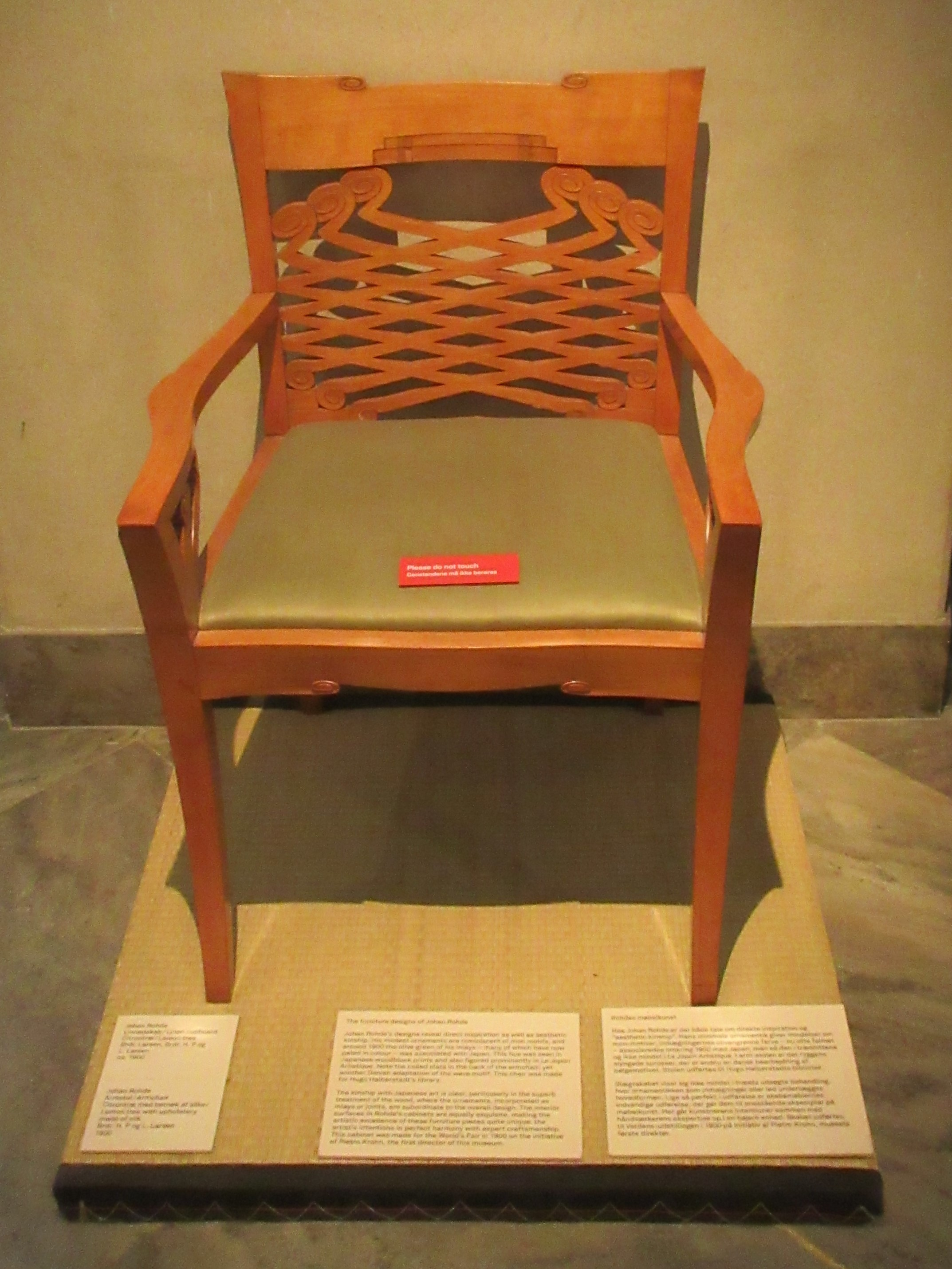
Chair designed by Rode on display in the Danish Design Museum.

=== Silver ===
Rhode's first silver designs were some spoons executed by Mogens Ballin in 1903. His first designs for Georg Jensen were created in 1906 and developed into a life-ling collaboration from 1908, although it was not contractually formalized until 1917. His work comprised cutlery and hollowware. It included the popular Acorn pattern for Georg Jensen.

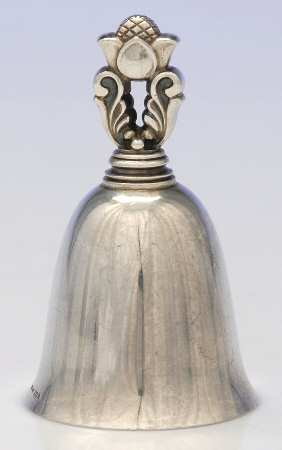
Georg Jensen - Acorn pattern tea ball.

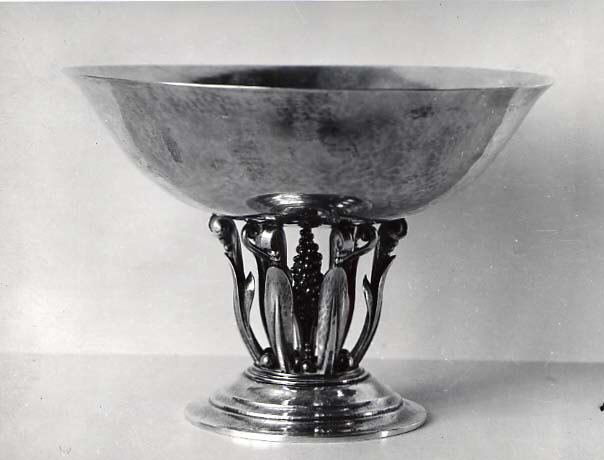
Rhode desig.

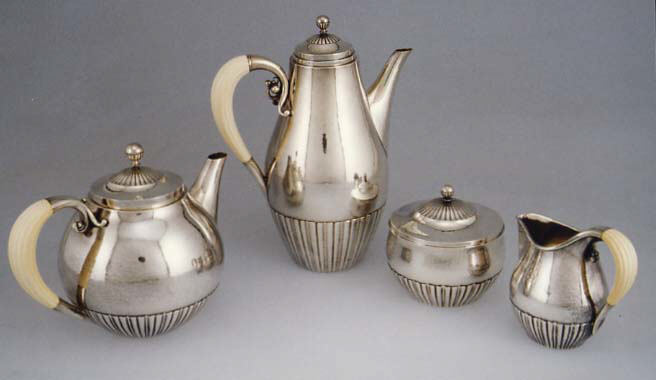
Coffee set by Rhode.

=== Printmaking ===
His 45 lithographs comprise portraits by J.F. Willumsen and Jan Verkade; as well as reproductions of Hammershøi's En Ung Pige der syer, J.-F. Millet's Brændehuggeren og Døden and Joakim Skovgaard's Bethesda Dam. He did not work with etchings until late in his life. 87 of his 97 etchings were created in the period 1932–34

He resided at Nyhavn 22 (first floor) from 1888 until 1900. On 1 November 1900, he moved to a second-floor apartment at Silkegade 13- On 1 May 1908, he moved to an apartment at Silkegade 13. On 1 May 1903 to 1 November 1904, he lived on the third floor of the Zinn House (Kvæsthusgade 3). From 1 November 1904 to 1 November 1911, he then lived at Nybrogade 12. He then resided first at Åbenrå 31 (second floor, 1 November 1911 - 1 November 1913) and Ny Vestergade 13 (third floor, 1 November 1913 -1 May 1919) before moving to his last home at Norgesmindevej 16 ub Hellerup.

== Personal life ==
Rohde married on 18 October 1903 in St. Andrew's Church in Copenhagen cand.mag. Asa Zøylner (1874-1960), daughter of businessman Johannes Henrik Emil Zøylner. (1838–1921) and Harriet Clausen (1842–1922). He was the father of the League of Nations official Gabriele Rohde and civil servant and director of the Royal Danish Theatre Henning Rohde.

== Awards ==
In 1934, Rohde was awarded the Thorvaldsen Medal.

== Selected paintings ==
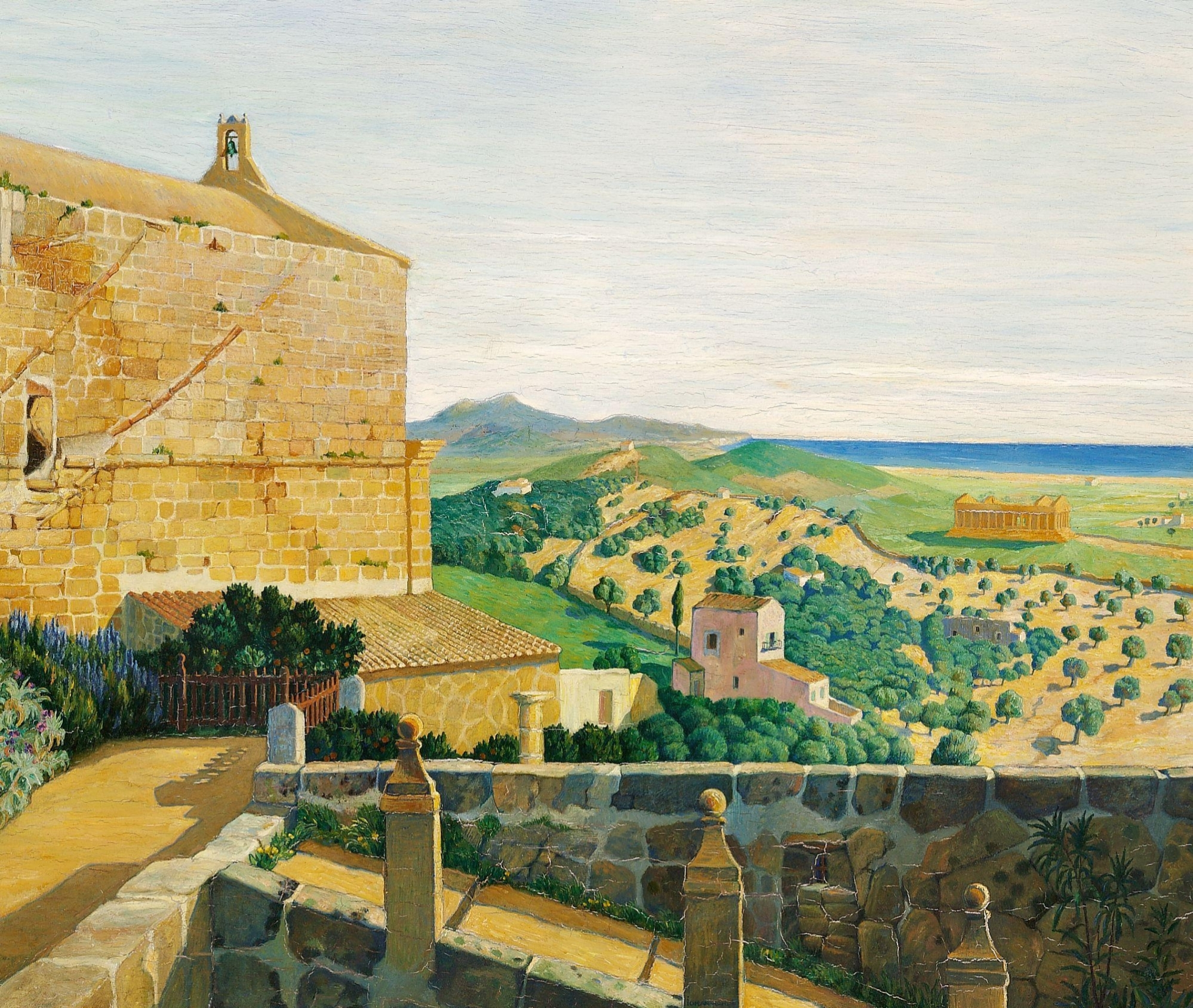
View Outside Agrigento

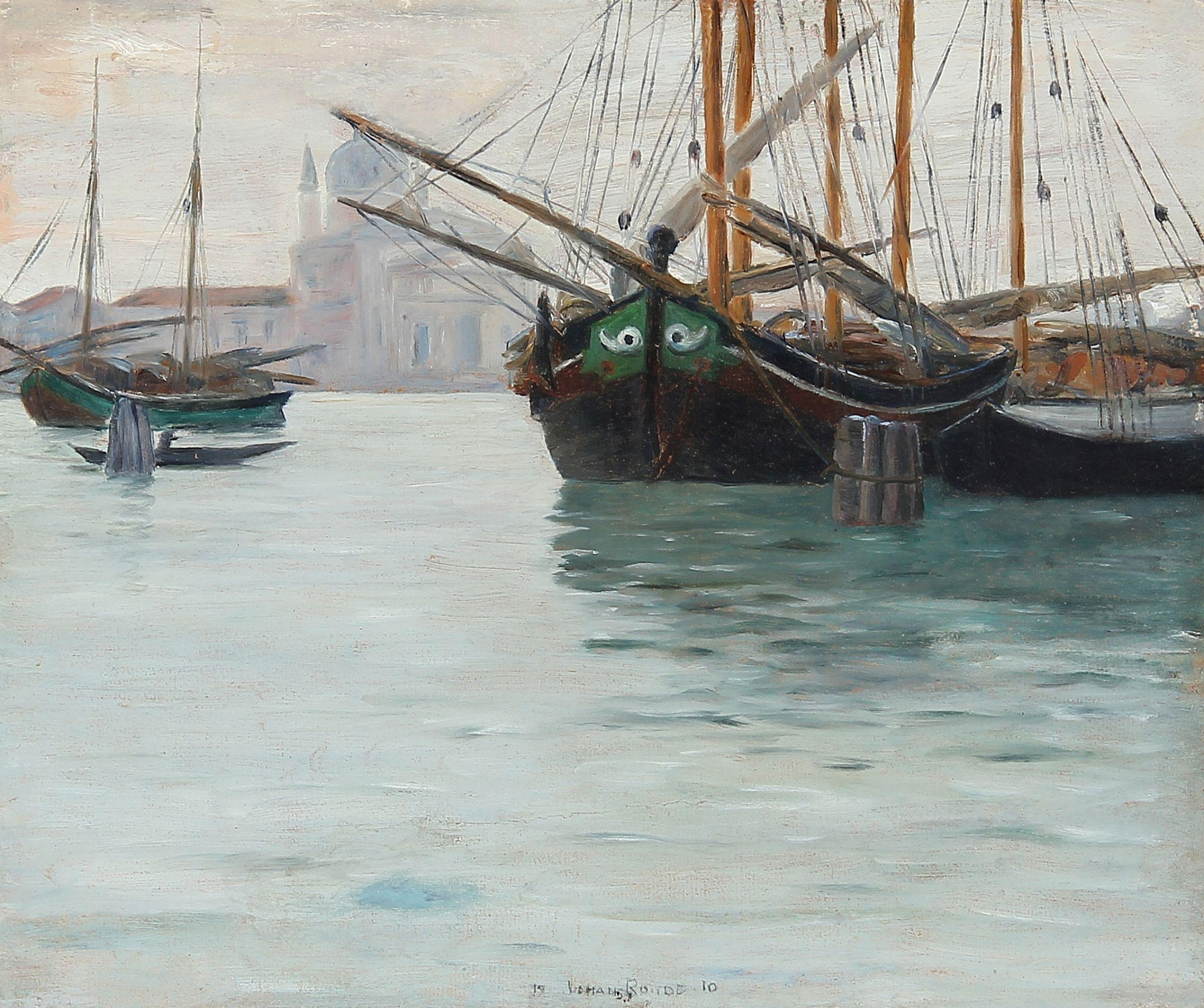
The Grand Canal in Venice

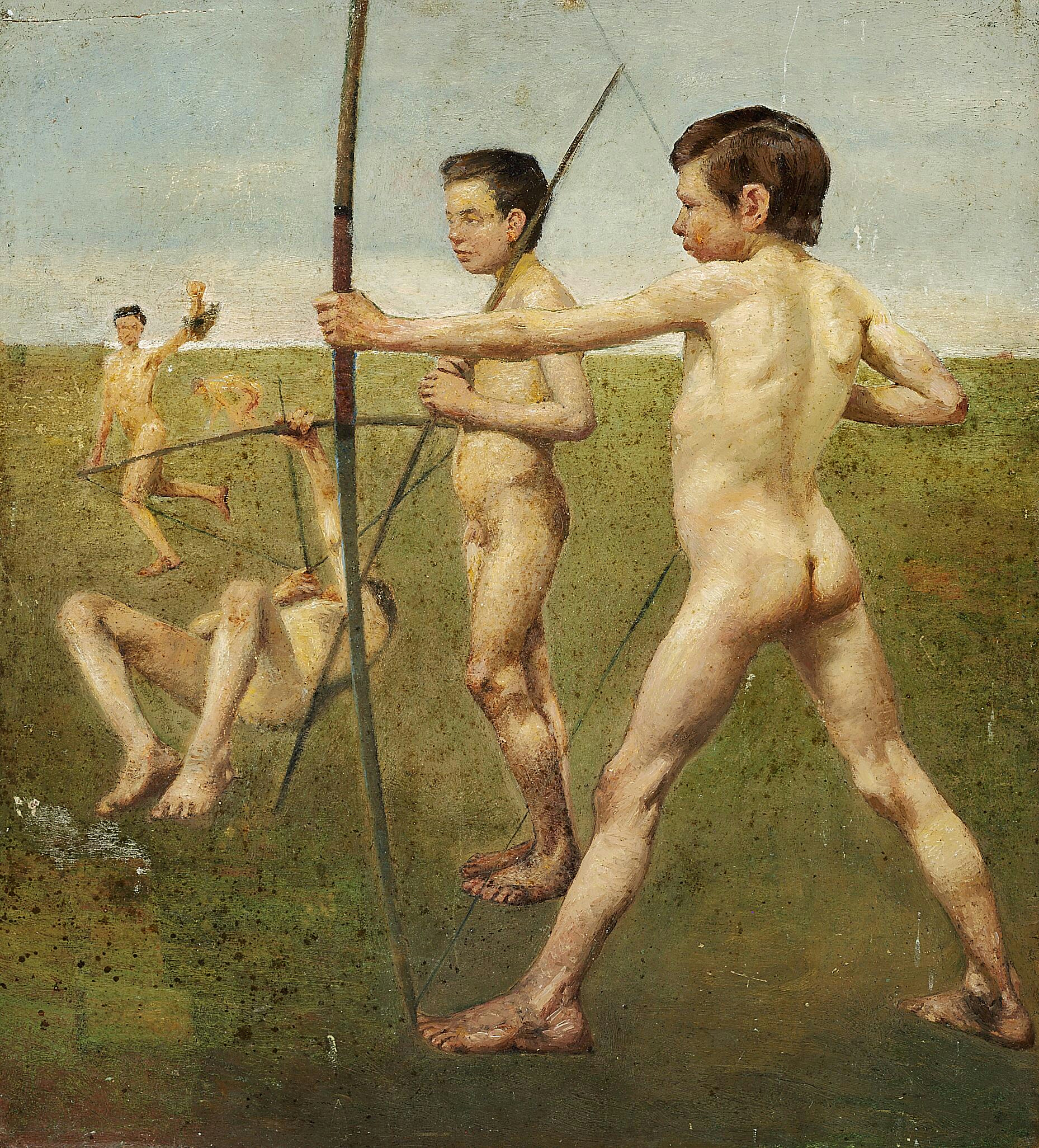
Naked Young Archers

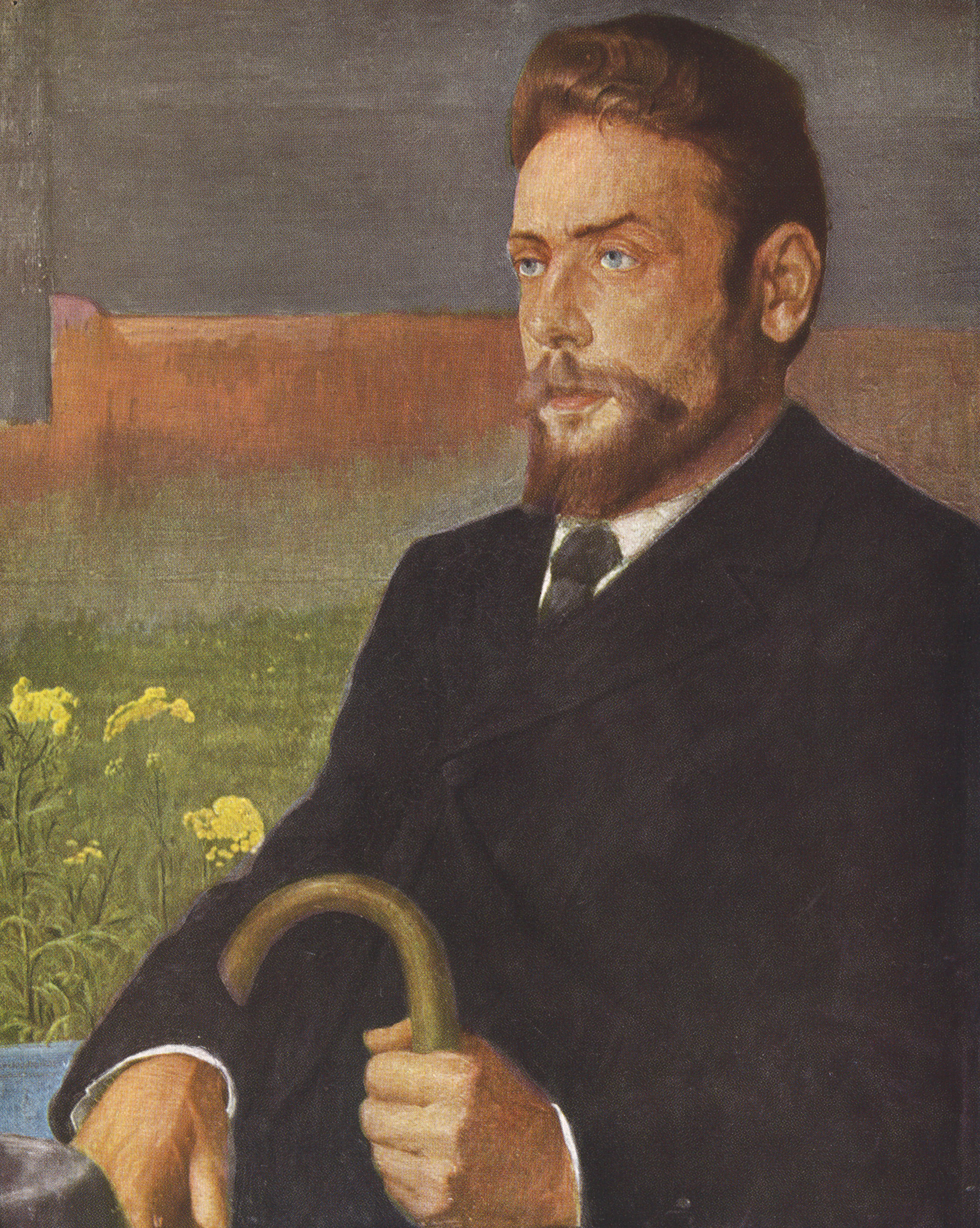
Henrik Pontoppidan

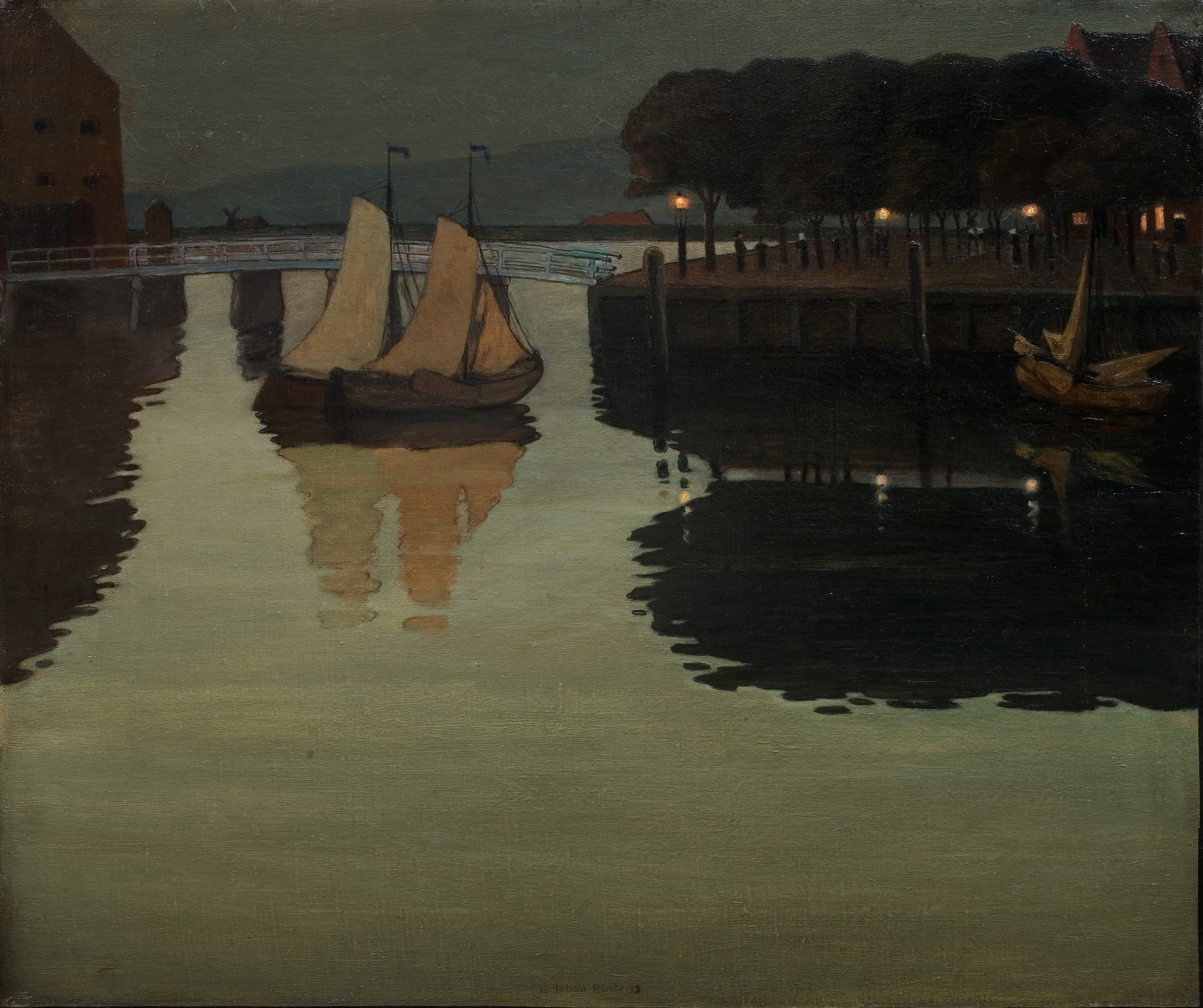
Johan Rohde: Quiet Evening in the Harbor at Hoorn, 1893. The Hirschsprung Collection, Copenhagen

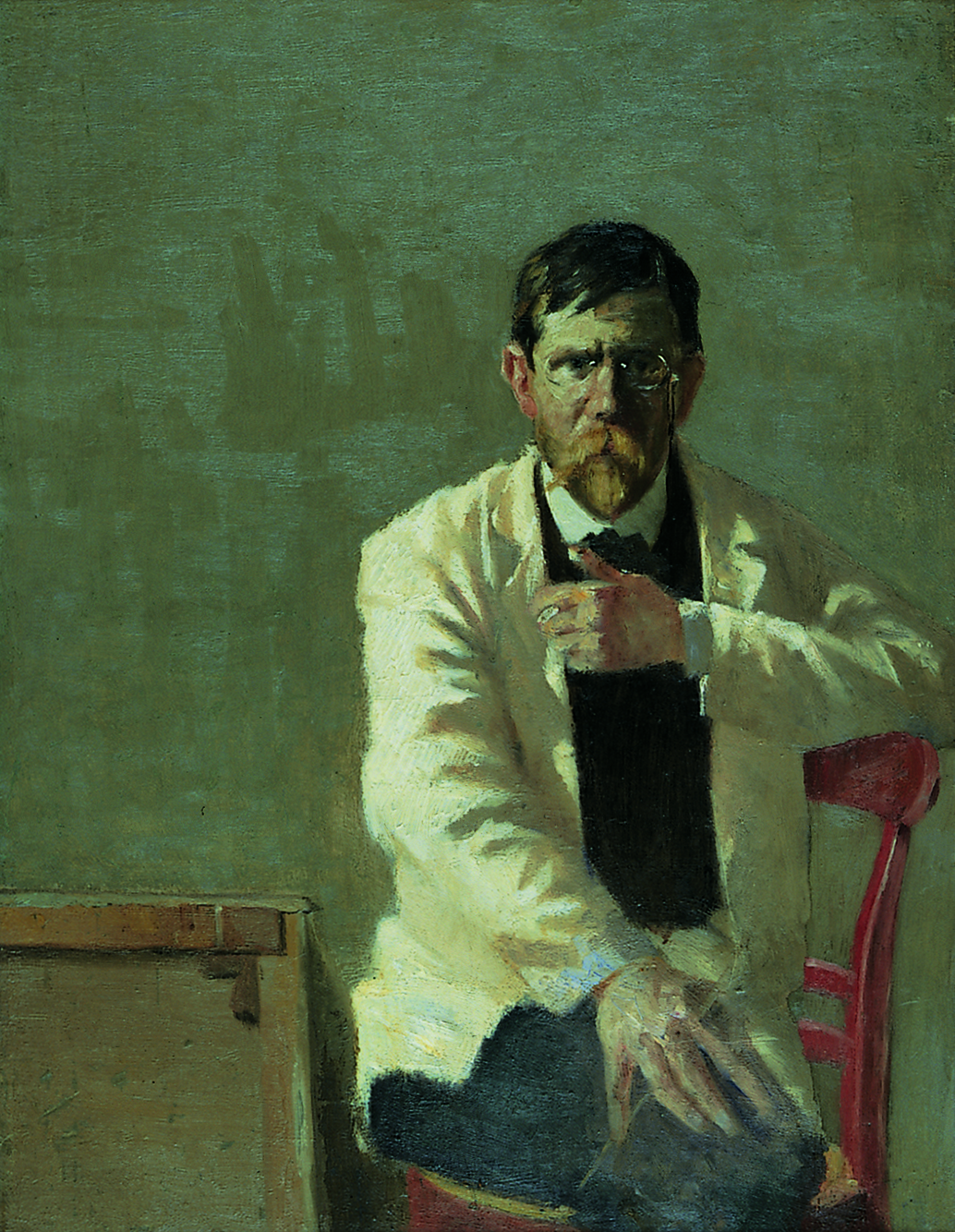
Johan Rohde: Selv-portrait, 1890. The Hirschsprung Collection, Copenhagen
