= Knabrostræde =

Street in Copenhagen, Denmark

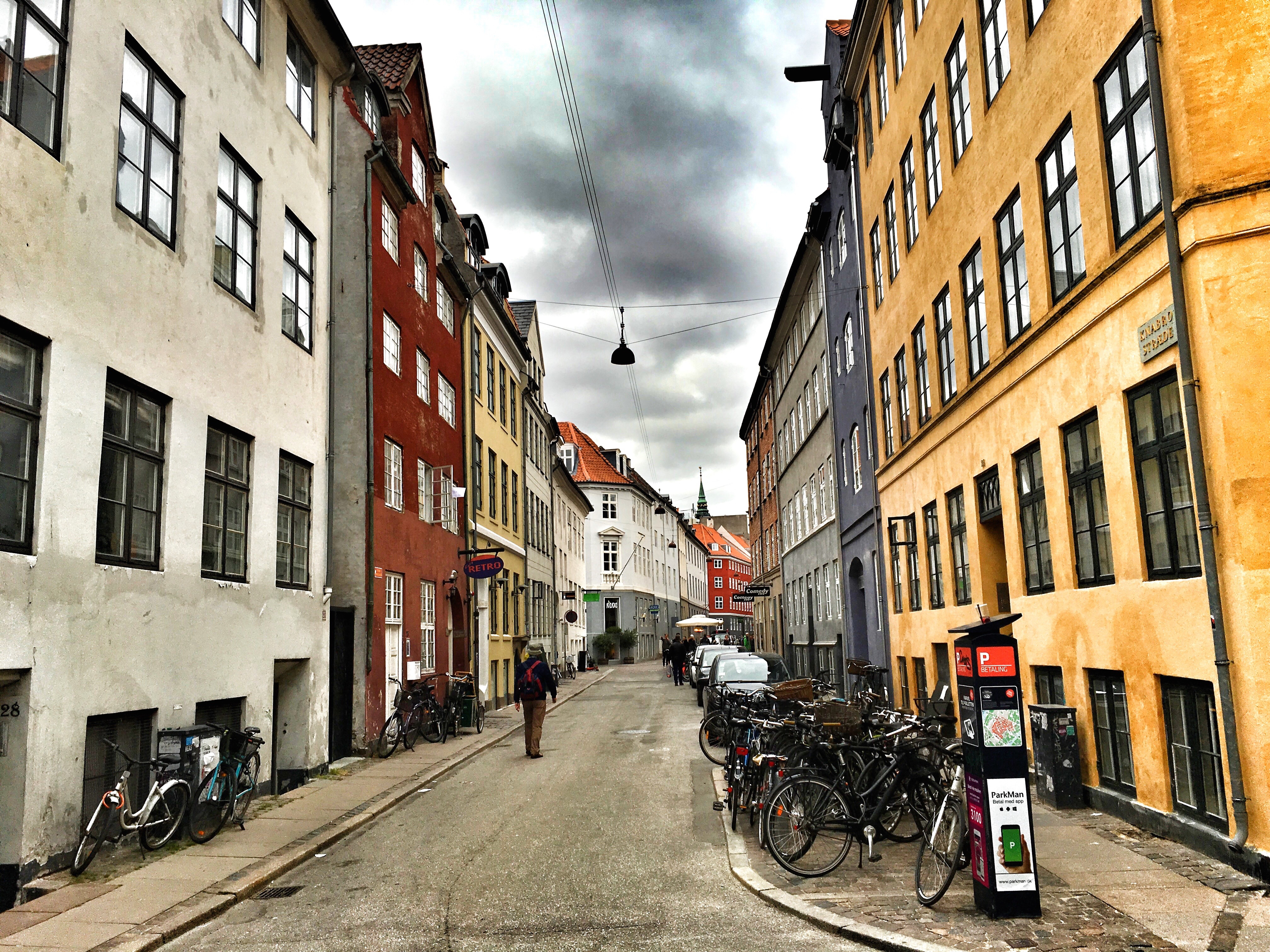
- Interactive map of Knabrostræde
- Length: 269 m (883 ft)
- Location: Copenhagen, Denmark
- Quarter: Indre By
- Postal code: 1210
- Nearest metro station: Gammel Strand
- Coordinates: 55°40′38.64″N 12°34′30.36″E
- Northwest end: Strøget
- Major junctions: Kompagnistræde
- Southeast end: Nybrogade

Knabrostræde is a street in the Old Town of Copenhagen, Denmark. It runs from Strøget (Vimmelskaftet/Nygade) in the northwest to Nybrogade at Slotsholmen Canal in the southeast, crossing Strædet (Kompagnistræde) on the way.

== History ==
The street was originally called Knagerøgstræde (lit. Alley of the Creaking Back). It is believed that the name refers to the sound it made when people used a public outhouse located on a small jetty by the beach at the end of the street. The name is later seen in the form Knækrygstræde and in its current form from 1689: The street was almost completely destroyed in the Copenhagen Fire of 1795.

== Notable buildings ==
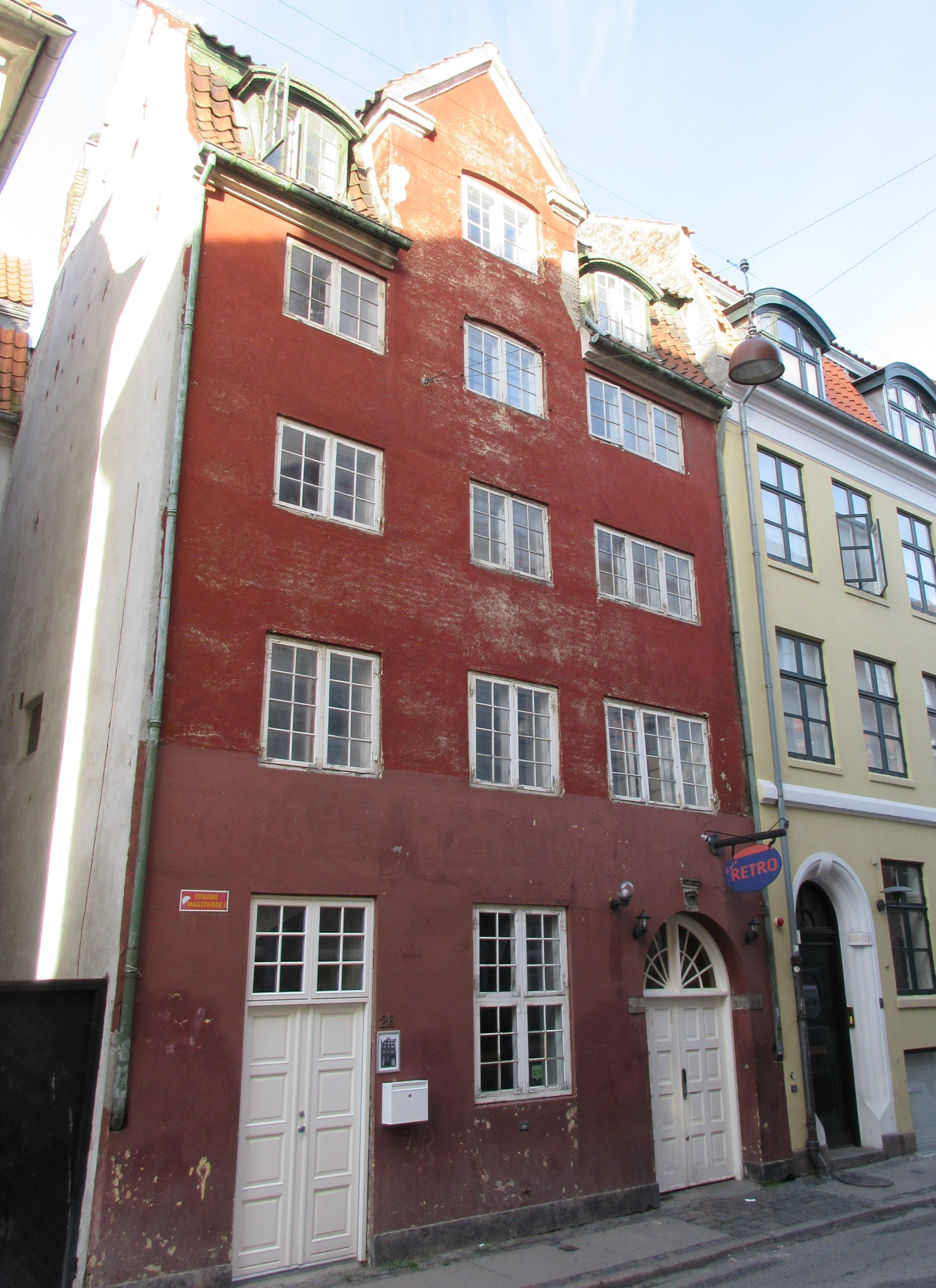
No. 26: Copenhagen International Church

The building at Knabrostræde 20/Kompagnistræde 21 is located where the Fire of 1795 stopped and the buildings at No. 20–30 (even numbers) all predate the fire and are all listed.

Np. 26 was acquired by the organisation "Young Christians" (Danish: Unge Kristne) in the late 1960s and converted into a church under the name Soli Deo Gloria. It has since 2003 been known as Copenhagen Community Church and is now especially frequented by Copenhagen's Filipino community .

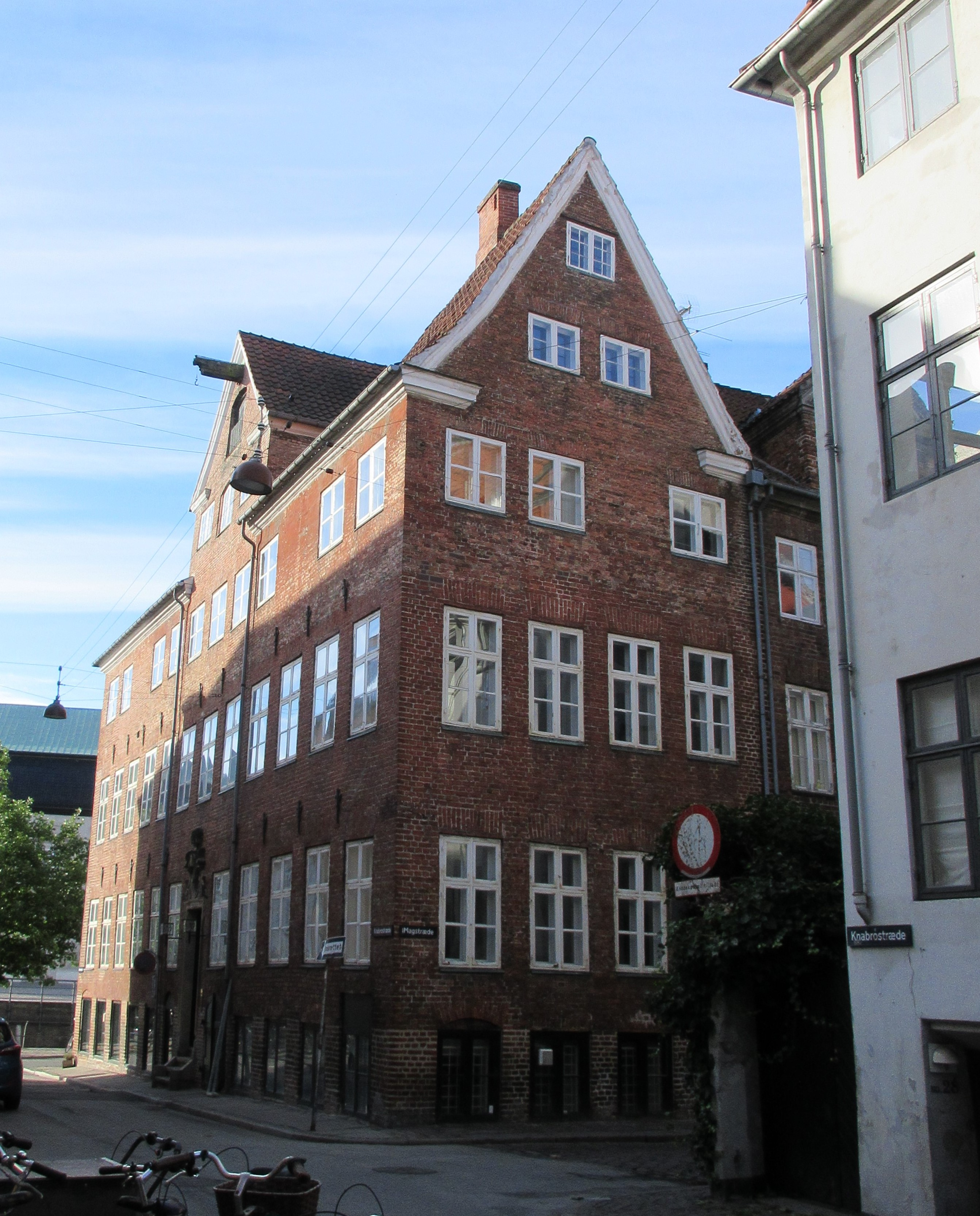
No. 30: The Fishmongers' House

No. 30 is the former building of Det Ferske Fiskehandler-Kompagni, a company associated with the fishmongers at Gammel Strand. The building is from 1730. The Rococo-style Ziegler House on the other side of the street, whose front faces Nybrogade and the canal, is also from the 1830s.

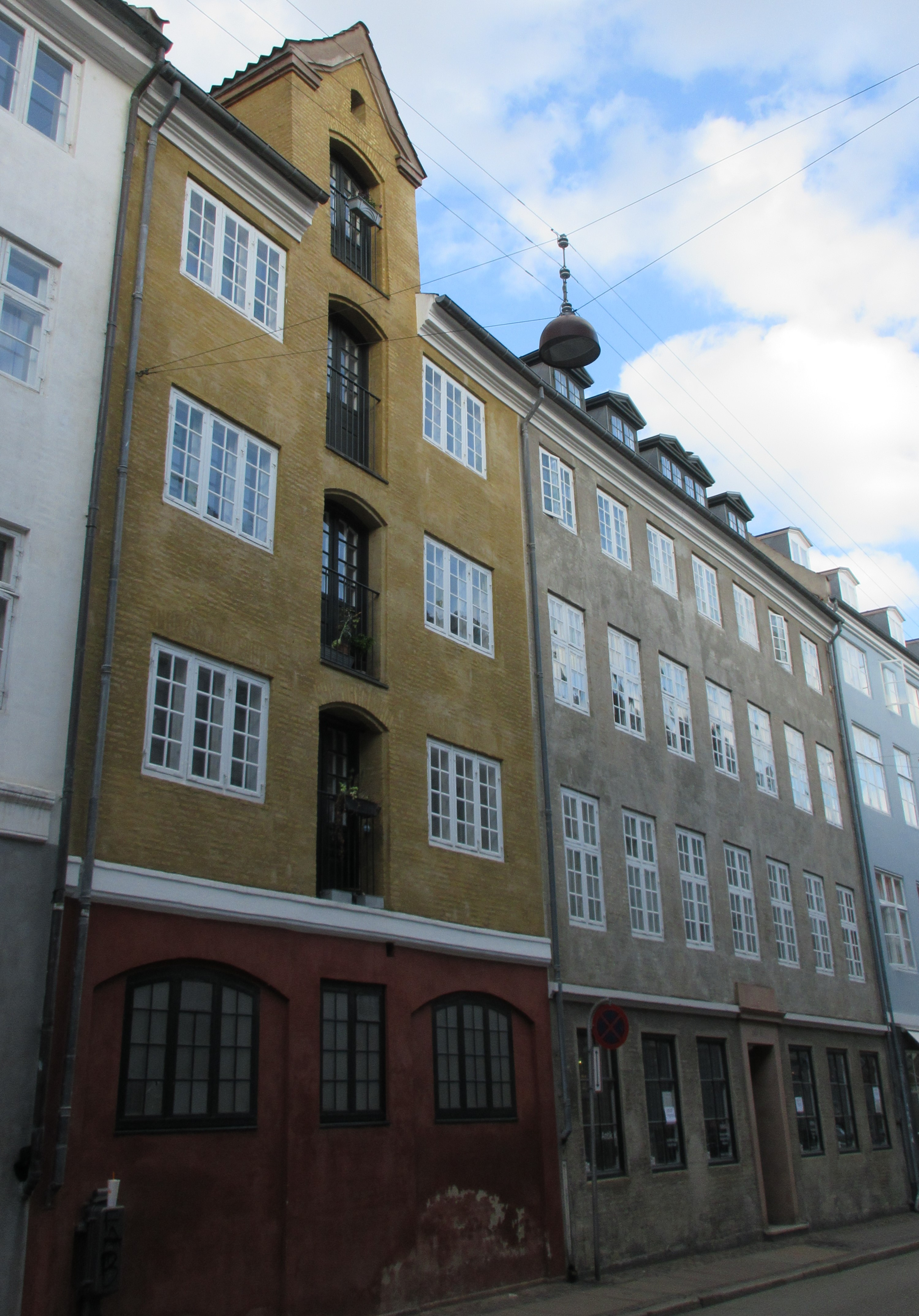
Knabrostræde 11-133

Most of the other buildings in the street date from the years immediately after the fire and are also listed. Knabrostræde 11-13 (1796–99) is part of J.C. Jacobsen's first brewery. He later moved his business to Valby, renaming it Carlsberg after his son Carl. Jacobsen was born around the corner at Brolæggerstræde 5 in 1811. Knabrostræde 19/Kompagnistræde 19 and 21 were built by Johan Martin Quist.

The night club Chateau Motel opened at Knabrostræde 3 in 2016, the former address of now closed Pan Club Copenhagen.
