= Gabriele Rohde =

Danish government official (1904–1946)

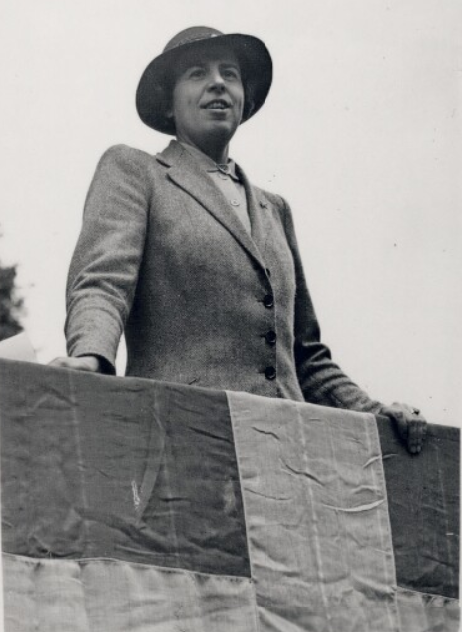
Gabriele Rohde, speaking in London (1943)

Gabriele Rohde (1904–1946) was a Danish League of Nations official in the 1930s and, during the Second World War, a member of the Danish Council (Det danske Råd) in London. She provided strong support in particular for Danish seafarers, creating a seamen's club in Newcastle. In 1943, Rohde travelled to Canada and the United States where she became an advisor to Henrik Kauffmann, the Danish ambassador in Washington. She assisted him in particular with his participation in the United Nations Relief and Rehabilitation Administration (UNRRA) conference which was held in Atlantic City that November. Shortly after returning to Denmark at the end of the war, she died in a tragic accident.

== Biography ==
Born in Copenhagen on 7 September 1904, Gabriele Rohde was the daughter of the painter Johan Gudmann Rohde (1856–1935) and Asa Zøylner (1874–1960). In May 1945, she married the estate owner and resistance member Gunnar Flemming Juncker (1904–2002).

Brought up in a cultural milieu in Copenhagen, she had two younger brothers, Henning, who became a theatre director, and Hermann, an art historian. As a child, she spent long periods with her seafaring family on the island of Fanø. After matriculating from N. Zahle's School in 1923, she studied languages and statistics. She completed her education in Paris where she studied the art and fashion industry.

After a few years of giving courses on her interests in Finland and Denmark, she spent a year undertaking statistical surveys for the Danish National Serum Institute. Thanks to her wide education and experience, she was then invited to become an official of the League of Nations in Geneva where she first worked for the health committee and then for the finance department where she managed the pension fund.

In 1940, fearing that Germany would occupy Switzerland, Rohde fled through occupied France to England where she sought to assist the Danish seafaring community while continuing to support her League of Nations interests. A strong supporter of the need for a free Danish movement in Britain, when the Danish Council was founded in September 1940, she became a member of the meetings and finance committee, establishing fruitful contacts with influential British and Danish officials. These included the Council's director Ferdinand Michael Krøyer Kielberg and Børge Møller who was responsible for the Danish seafarers' organization (De Sammensluttede Danske Sømandsorganisationer) in Newcastle. Rohde was particularly active in Newcastle where she took part in organizing the activities of the Danish centre which provided a range of services to Danish seamen.

In 1942, on behalf of the Danish Council, Rohde met the Danish ambassador Henrik Kauffmann in Washington. As a result, in 1943 she spent six months in Canada and the United States. In particular, she assisted Kauffmann with preparations for the UNRRA meeting in Atlantic City, reporting on the discussions in a lengthy article in the Danish Council's magazine Frit Danmark.

While still in London, in 1944 she met Flemming Juncker who was attached to the Special Operations Executive, where he was responsible for Danish paratroopers. The couple married in May 1945 and had a daughter Asa Margrethe on 14 November.

Less than half a year later, Gabriele Rohde fell through a hole on the first floor of Juncker's estate Overgård on Mariager Fjord in Jutland, breaking her neck on the stone floor below. Despite hospital treatment in Aarhus, she died on 5 April 1946 from pneumonia.
