= Lille Strandstræde 16 =

Building in Copenhagen, Denmark

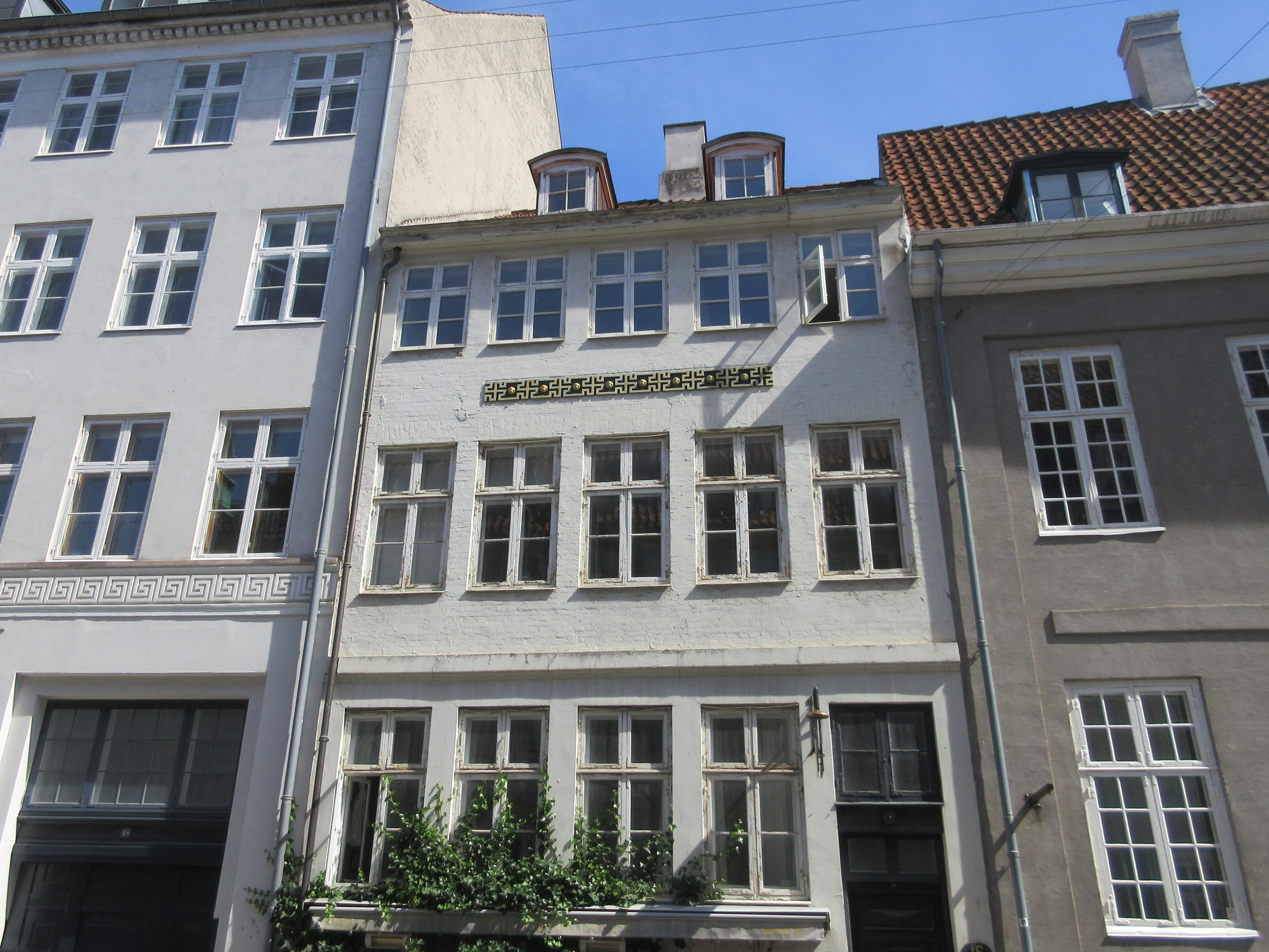
- Lille Strandstræde 15 in July 2024
- Interactive map of the Lille Strandstræde 16 area

General information
- Architectural style: Neoclassical
- Location: Copenhagen, Denmark
- Coordinates: 55°40′51.67″N 12°35′24.14″E
- Completed: 18th century

Lille Strandstræde 16 is a Neoclassical property situated on Lille Strandstræde, between Sankt Annæ Plads and Nyhavn in central Copenhagen, Denmark. The building was listed in the Danish registry of protected buildings and places in 1950.

== History ==
=== Early history ===
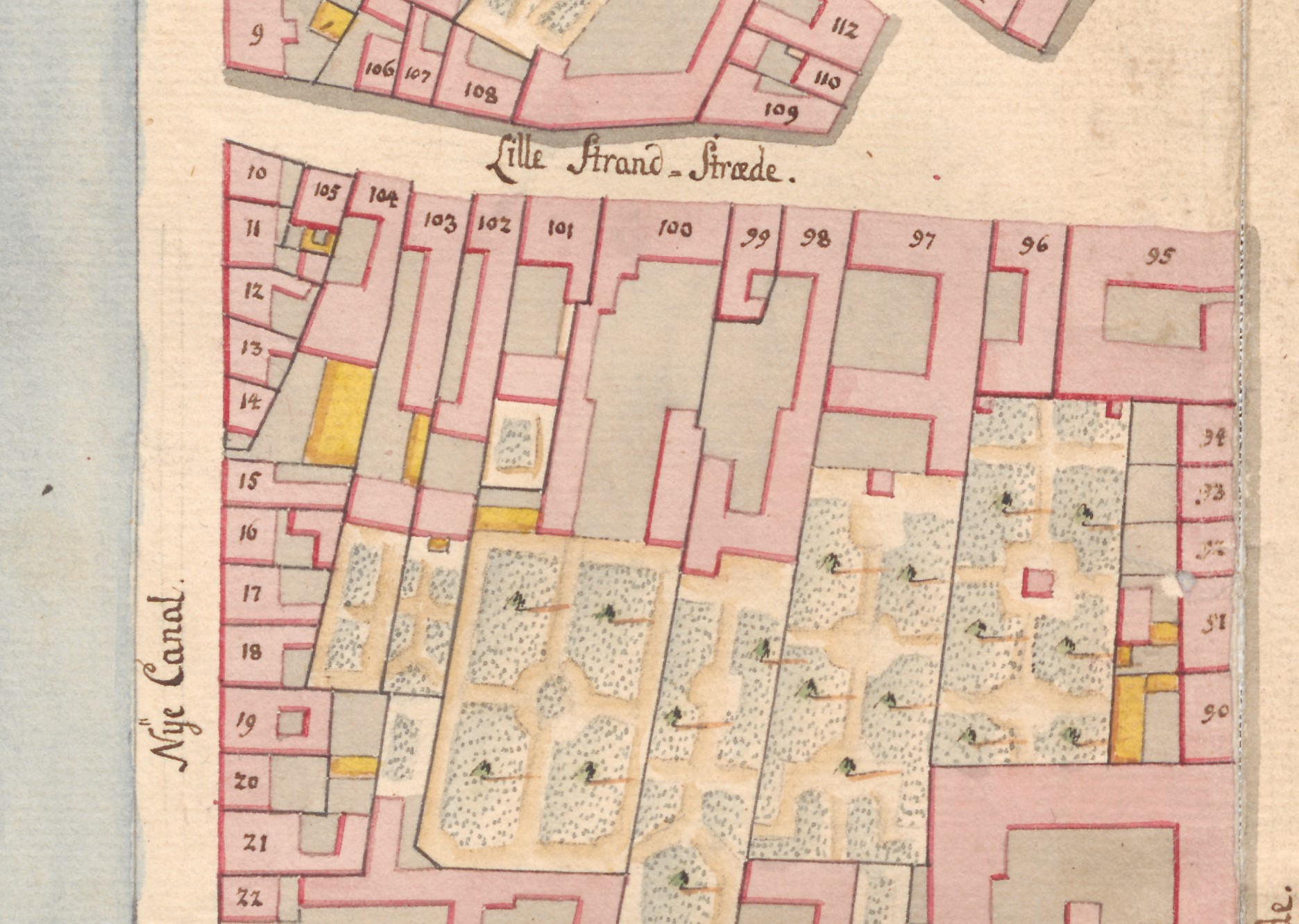
No. 99 seen in a detail from Christian Gedde's map of St. Ann's East Quarter, 1757

The property was in the late 17th century part of a larger property. This large property was listed in Copenhagen's first cadastre from 1689 as No. 26 in St. Ann's East Quarter (Sankt Annæ Øster Kvarter), owned by Jens Broch. In 1730 the property was divided into a number of smaller properties. The one now known as Lille Strandstræde 16 belonged to Iver Grøngaard in 1731. The property was listed as No. 99 in the new cadastre of 1756 and was then owned by mail coachman Jacob Boetzius.

=== Busk family ===
At the time of the 1787 census, No. 99 was home to a total of 21 residents distributed among five households. Christiane Busk, the owner of the property, resided there with his six children (aged two to ten) and one lodger. His wife is for some reason not mentioned among the residents. Sevastia Christoph Leib, a retired infantry captain, resided in the building with a maid. Johan Wølffert, a first mate (styrmand), resided in the building with his wife Marie Faber and their one-year-old son Friderich Chr. Henrich. Peder Nielsen Norup, a workman, resided in the building with his wife Dorthea Kirstine and their three daughters (aged three to 11). Niels Ellafsen Bruun, a cellarman, resided in the building with his wife Else Catrine and a maid.

=== Espersen Brandt family ===
The property was later acquired by ship captain Anders Espersen Brandt. His property was home to 16 residents in three households at the 1801 census. Brandt resided in one of the apartments with his wife Karen Christine Brandt, their three sons (aged four to seven) and three maids. Christoph Wessel, a skipper, resided in another apartment with his wife Gundel Wessel and one maid. The residents of the third apartment were three mates (all in their 20s) and a 39-year-old widow with her nine-year-old son.

In the new cadastre of 1806, the property was listed as No. 67. It was then owned by ship captain Andreas Espensen Brandt.

=== Hiese Jillebrandt family ===
At the time of the 1834 census, No. 56 was home to 28 people distributed among four households. Anna Giese (née Jessen), widow of Hans Jacob Jensen Giese (1764–1829), resided on the ground floor with her two sons (aged 25 and 28) and one lodger. Jakob Tygesen, a royal cook, resided on the first floor with his wife Johanna Adolfsen and their five children (aged two to ten). Hans Esper Hillebrandt (1786–1854), a skipper, resided on the second floor with his wife Marie Giese Hansdatter Hillebrandt (née Giese), their four children (aged two to eight) and one maid. Niels Wiberg, an office courier, resided in the basement with his wife Regine Schneider and their six children (aged one to ten).

At the time of the 1840 census, No. 67 was home to 19 residents. Ane Giese (née Jessen) was now residing in the first floor apartment with three unmarried children (aged 24 to 33) and one maid. Hans and Marie Hildebrandt, now with five children, were still residing on the second floor. Adam Nielsen, a royal stableman, resided on the ground floor with his wife Anne Ziegler and their two daughters (aged three and five). August Behrends and August Dittmar, a student at the Royal Danish Academy of Fine Arts and a sculptor, respectively, resided in a room towards the yard with one lodger.

== Architecture ==
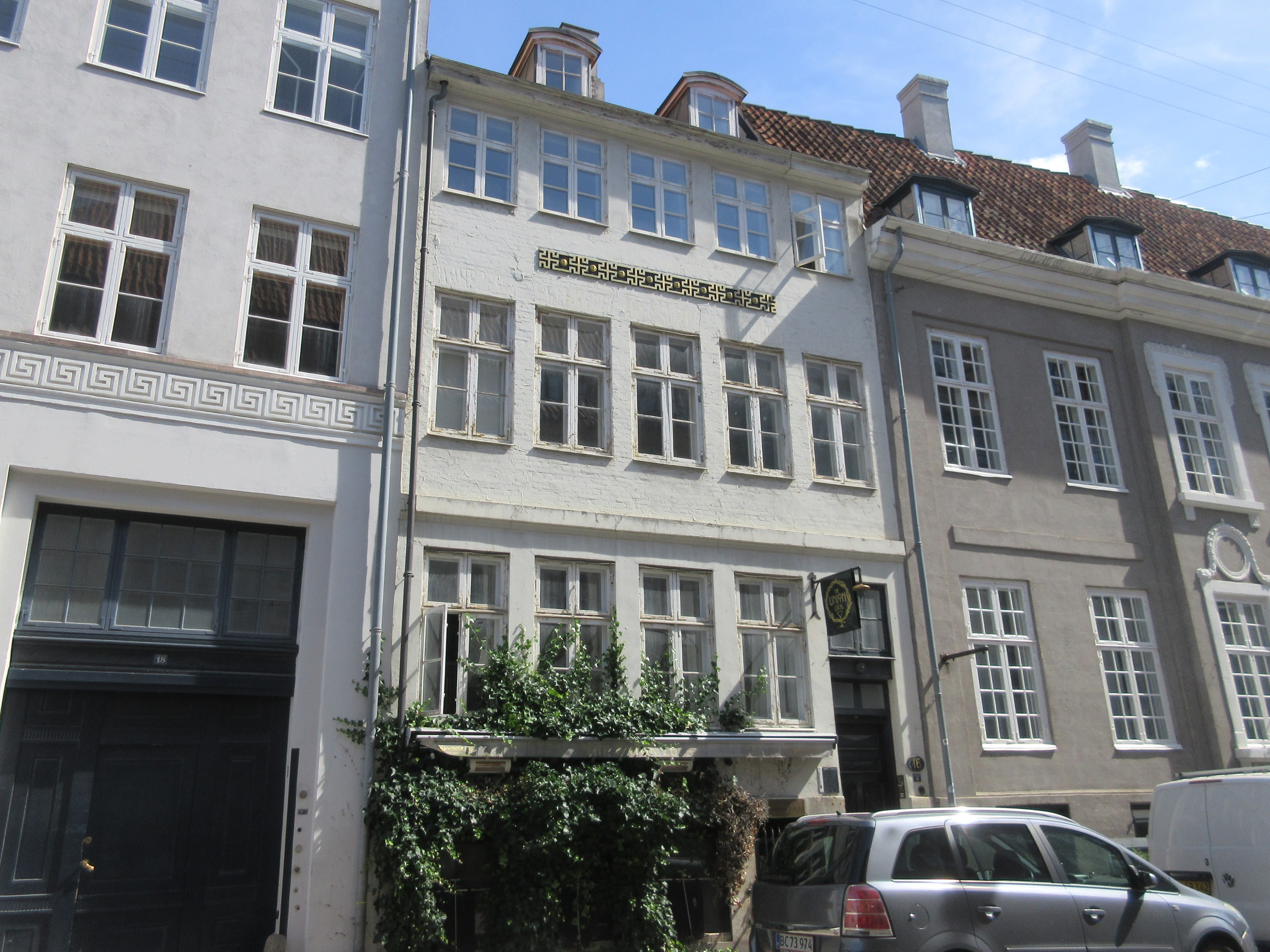
The building viewed from the street

Lille Strandstræde 16 is constructed with three storeys above a walk-out basement. The facade is finished with a belt course above the ground floor, a decorative frieze between the central windows of the two upper floors and a cornice below the roof. The roof features two dormer windows towards the street. The building was listed in the Danish registry of protected buildings and places in 1950.

== Today ==
The property was owned by Lene Thorn from 1898 until at least 2009.
