= Forhåbningsholms Allé =

Street in Copenhagen, Denmark

Forhåbningsholms Allé is a street in the Frederiksberg district of Copenhagen, Denmark. It runs from Gammel Kongevej in the south to Niels Ebbesens Vej in the north. Notable buildings in the street include the Immanuel Church from 1893 (No. 20A) and the former country house Forhåbningsholm (No. 23) for which the street is named.

== History ==
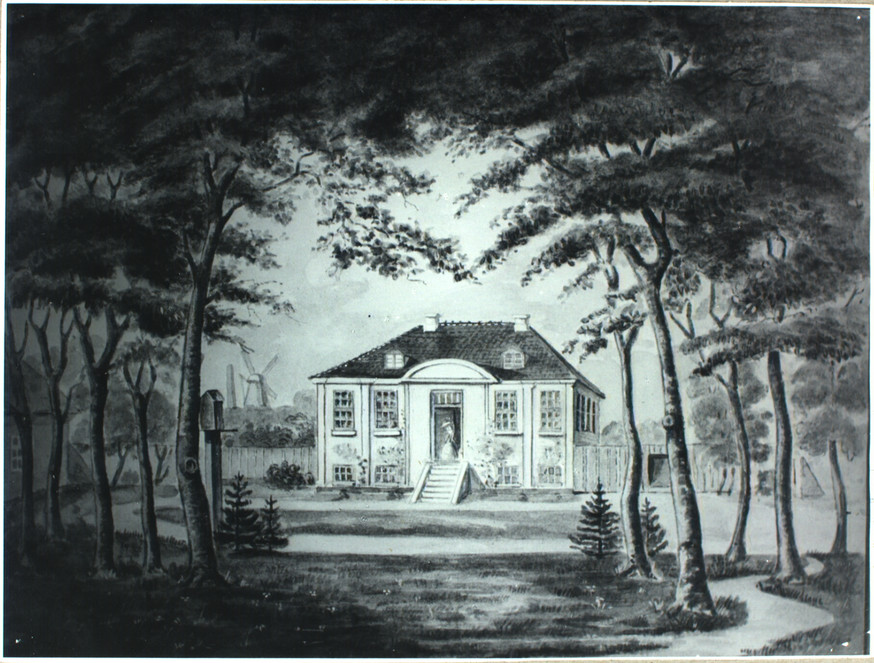
Forhåbningsholm, 1850

The merchant Henning Frederik Bargum bought a piece of land and constructed the country house Forhåbningsholm at the site in 1765. Bargum was that same year a driving force behind the establishment of Det danske Guineiske Kompagni. On 18 March 1765, he was granted a 20-year monopoly on slave trade from the Danish Gold Coast and on 1 November that same year a royal concession on the fortresses of Christiansborg and Fredensborg. The business plan was to purchase gold, ivory, and slaves on the Danish Gold Coast, then sell the slaves in the Danish West Indies and return with raw sugar to Denmark. Three ships were initially acquired of which the first departed from Copenhagen on 8 January 1766. The company went bankrupt in 1775. Betgum had fled the country the previous year.

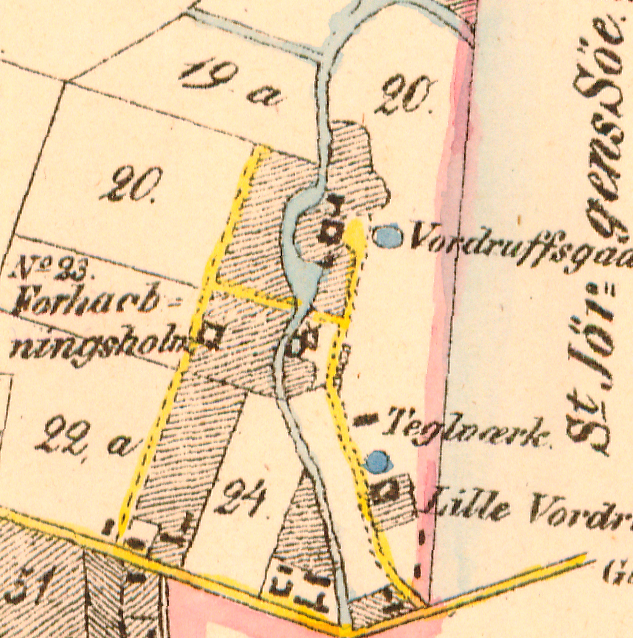
The street seen on a detail from an old map

A later owner, Arthur Howden, a Scotchman, operated the estate as a workhouse. His countryman, Alexander Mitchell, established a production of stockings at the site in the early 1780s. The house was later operated as a training facility for brewers.

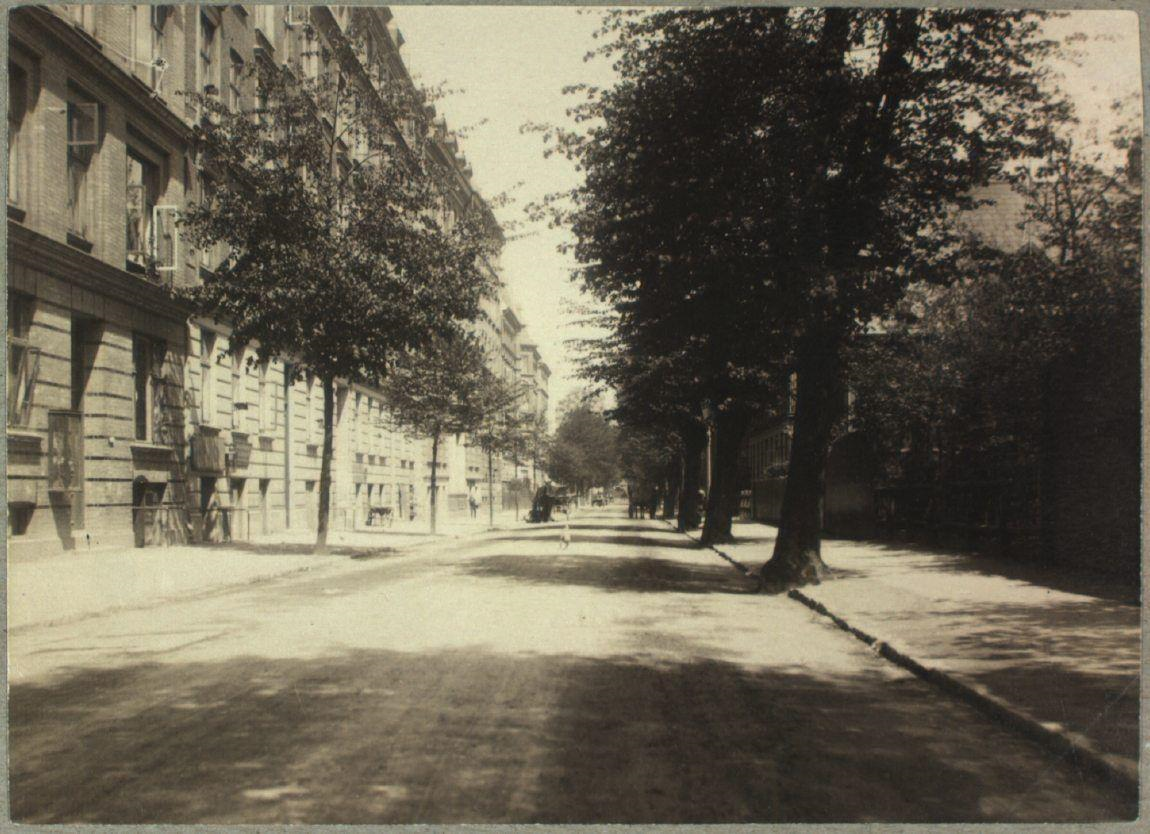
The street in 1899

Henning Wolff, Frederiksberg's first city architect, created a masterplan for a new neighbourhood of single-family detached homes in the area. It involved an extension of Forhåbningsholms Allé all the way to Niels Ebbesens Vej. The street was at the same time lined with trees. Wolff was also responsible for the construction of two houses for employees at nearby Kongens Bryghus on Vodroffsvej but they have later been demolished.

Some of the houses along the street were later replaced by taller apartment buildings. Birgitte Berg Nielsens opened Birgitte Berg Nielsens Husholdningsskole at No. 18 in 1905. The trees that used to line the street disappeared when the street was refurbished in 1942–43,

== Notable buildings ==
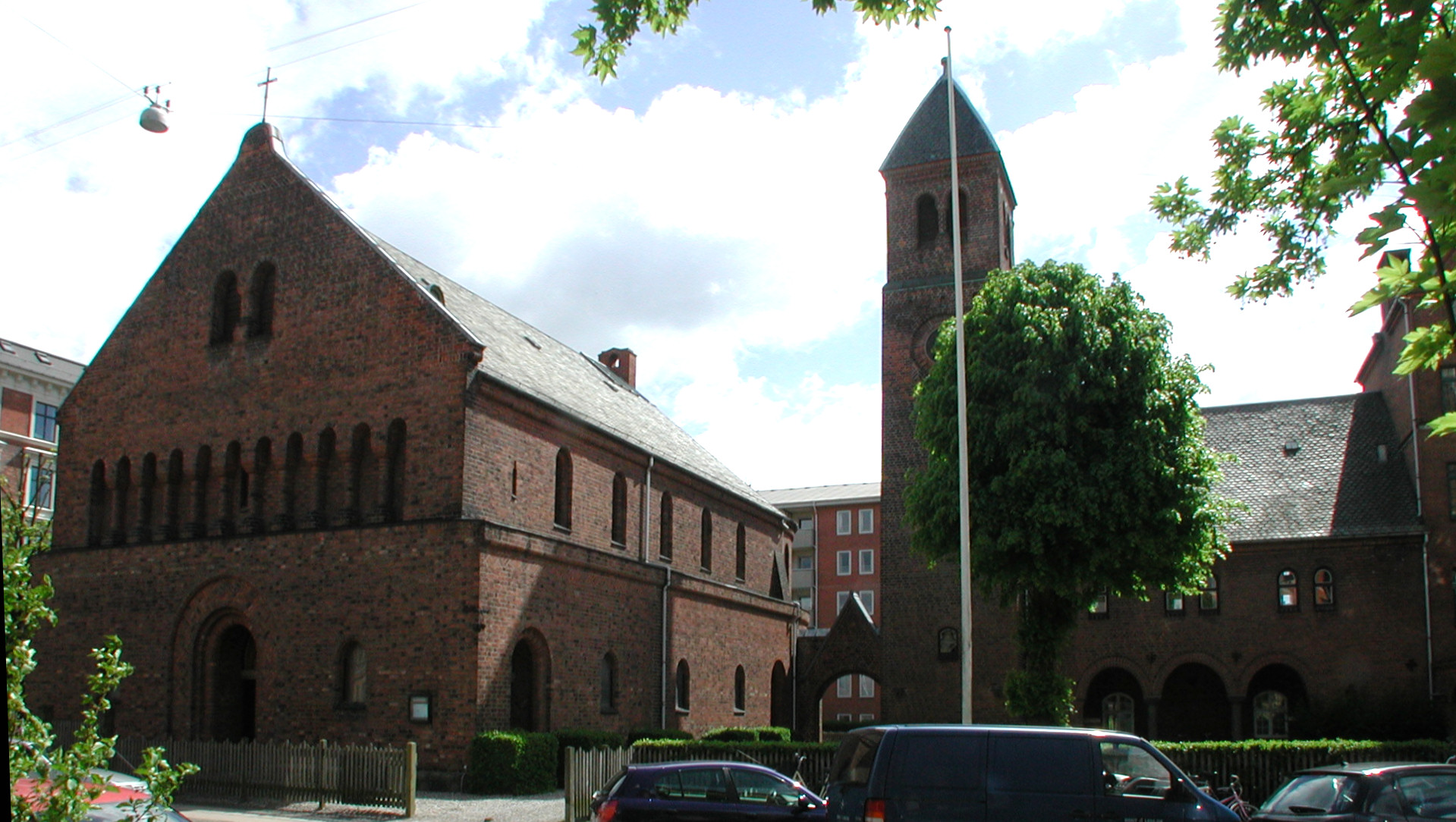
No. 20A The Immanuel Church

The Immanuel Church (No. 20A) belongs to Københavns Valgmenighed, a Grundtvigian congregation under Church of Denmark. The building was designed by Andreas Clemmesen and completed in 1893. The artists Niels and Joakim Skovgaard and Niels Larsen Stevns, all three members of the congregation, decorated the church building together with a group of other artists, providing a series of glass mosaics above the entrances as well as the church furnishings.

Forhåbningsholm (No. 24) is now owned by Frederiksberg Municipality and operated as a daycare.

== Notable people ==
- Kristian Arentzen (1823–1899), writer and educator, lived at No. 3 in 1883–99.
- Dan Turèll (1946–1993), writer

== See also ==
- Schønbergsgade
