= Ole Boye =

Danish architect

Ole Ancher Secher Sørensen Boye (4 May 1856 – 24 October 1907) was a Danish architect. He was mainly active in Frederiksberg.

== Early life and education ==
Boye was born on 4 May 1856 at i Tinning in Foldby Parish, Jutland, the son of farmer Søren Christiansen (Smed) and Ellen Laursdatter. He assumed the name Boye in circa 1885.

== Career ==
Boye was mainly active in Frederiksberg. He designed a number of robust apartment building for the upper middle class. His early works are characterized by dressed masonry and stucco decorations. In the late 1880s, he started to experiment with patterned brickwork and majolica ornamentation.

== Personal life ==
Boyye was married to Asta Dorthea Jørgensen (26. December 1867(, a daughter of tavern owner Frederik Vilhelm Jørgensen and Botilla Maria Lorentzen. The marriage was later dissolved. Boye suffered from depressions and struggled with economic difficulties. He committed suicide on 24 October 1907 and is buried at Vestre Cemetery.

== Selected works ==
- Folkvarsvej 4–6, Frederiksberg (1887)
- Ceresvej 20, Frederiksberg (1889)
- Falkoner Allé 24, Frederiksberg (1889)
- Gammel Kongevej 86A, Frederiksberg (1889)
- Frederiksberg Allé 51 (1889)
- Christian Winthers Vej 16, Frederiksberg (1890, senere ombygget)
- Frederiksberg Allé 92/Mynstersvej 2 (1892)
- Gammel Kongevej 161, Frederiksberg (1892)
- Gammel Kongevej 123–125, Frederiksberg (1893-94)
- Frederiksberg Allé 58-60 (1894)
- Gammel Kongevej 127/Madvigs Allé 15, Frederiksberg (1894)
- Gammel Kongevej 128 og 130, Frederiksberg (1895, begge med for- og baghus)
- Gammel Kongevej 174, Frederiksberg (1895)
- Amaliegade 26–36, Copenhagen (1896)
- H.C. Ørsteds Vej 31–33, Frederiksberg (1901)
- Frederiksberg Allé 53/Kochsvej 2 (1904, with Ludvig Andersen)
- H.C. Ørsteds Vej 61, Frederiksberg (1905)
- Lykkesholms Allé 6 and 6A, Frederiksberg (1905)
- Sankt Knuds Vej 11, Frederiksberg (1905)
- Tvermoesgård, Rosengården 12–14, København (1905, with Thorvald Jørgensen)

== See also ==
- Rogert Møller
