= Niels Ebbesens Vej =

Street in Copenhagen, Denmark

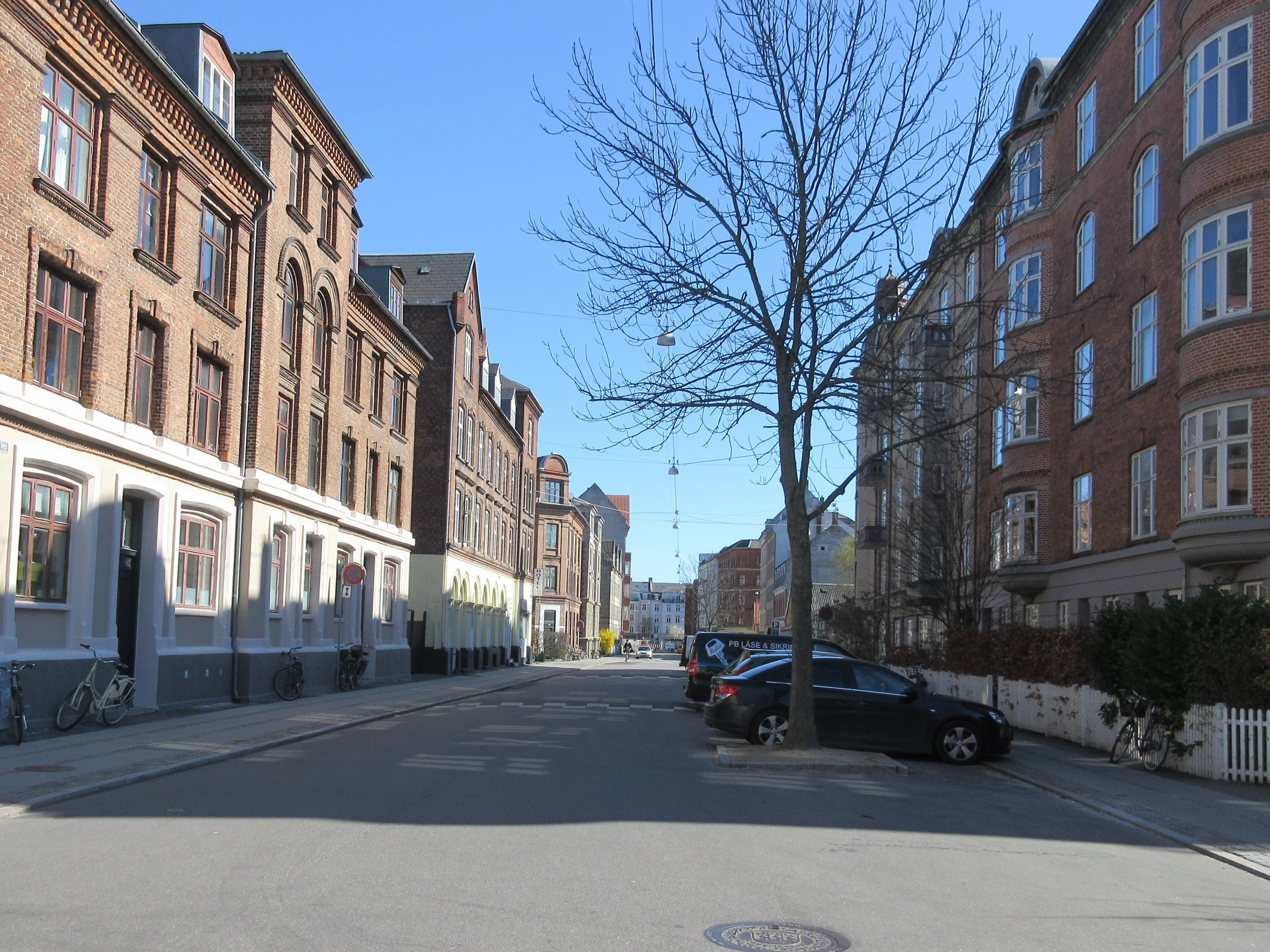
- Length: 477 m (1,565 ft)
- Location: Copenhagen, Denmark
- Quarter: Frederiksberg
- Nearest metro station: Forum
- Coordinates: 55°40′40.79″N 12°33′4.78″E
- East end: Vodroffsvej
- West end: H. C. Ørsteds Vej

Niels Ebbesens Vej is a street in the Frederiksberg district of Copenhagen, Denmark, linking Vodroffsvej in the east with H. C. Ørsteds Vej in the west. It is a one-way street and has speed reducing features. Skolen ved Søerne, a public primary school, is based at No. 10. The street is named after Niels Ebbesen.

== History ==
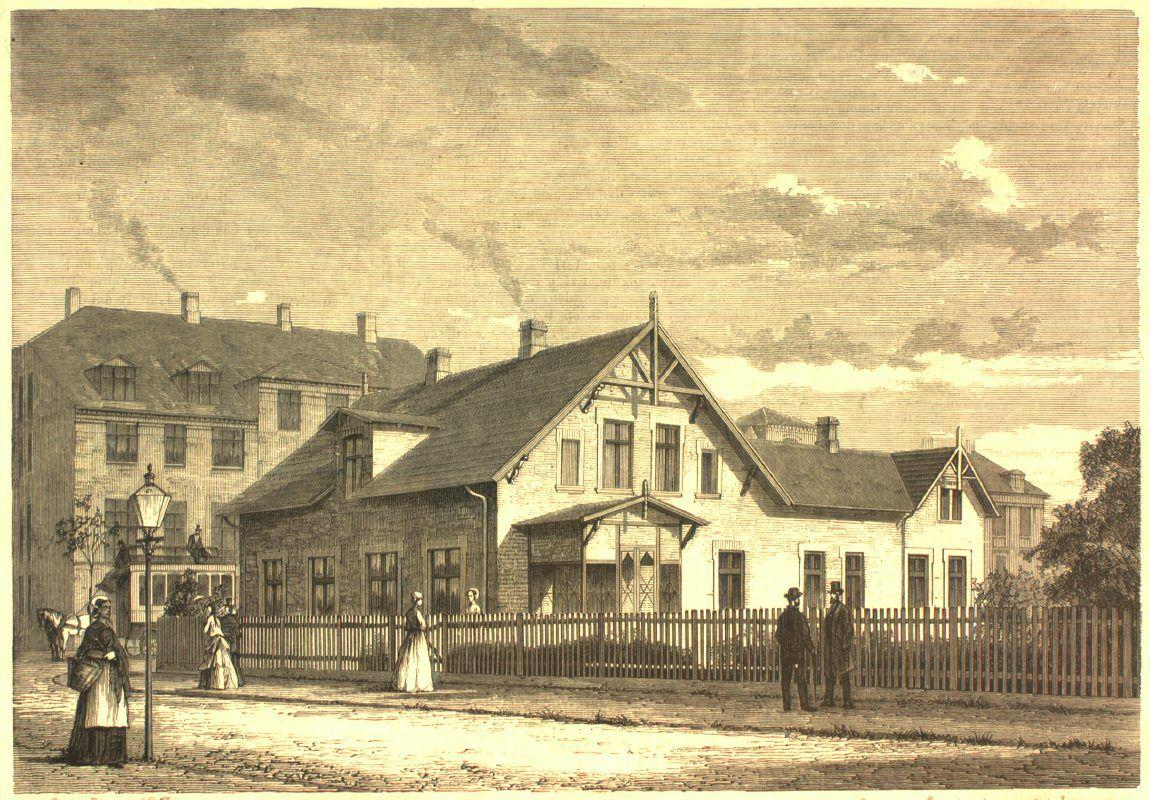
The Practical Maids' School in 1873

Niels Ebbesens Vej was originally a private road linking Vordroftsgård with its fields to the west. It was converted into a public road and gradually extended in the late 1860s.

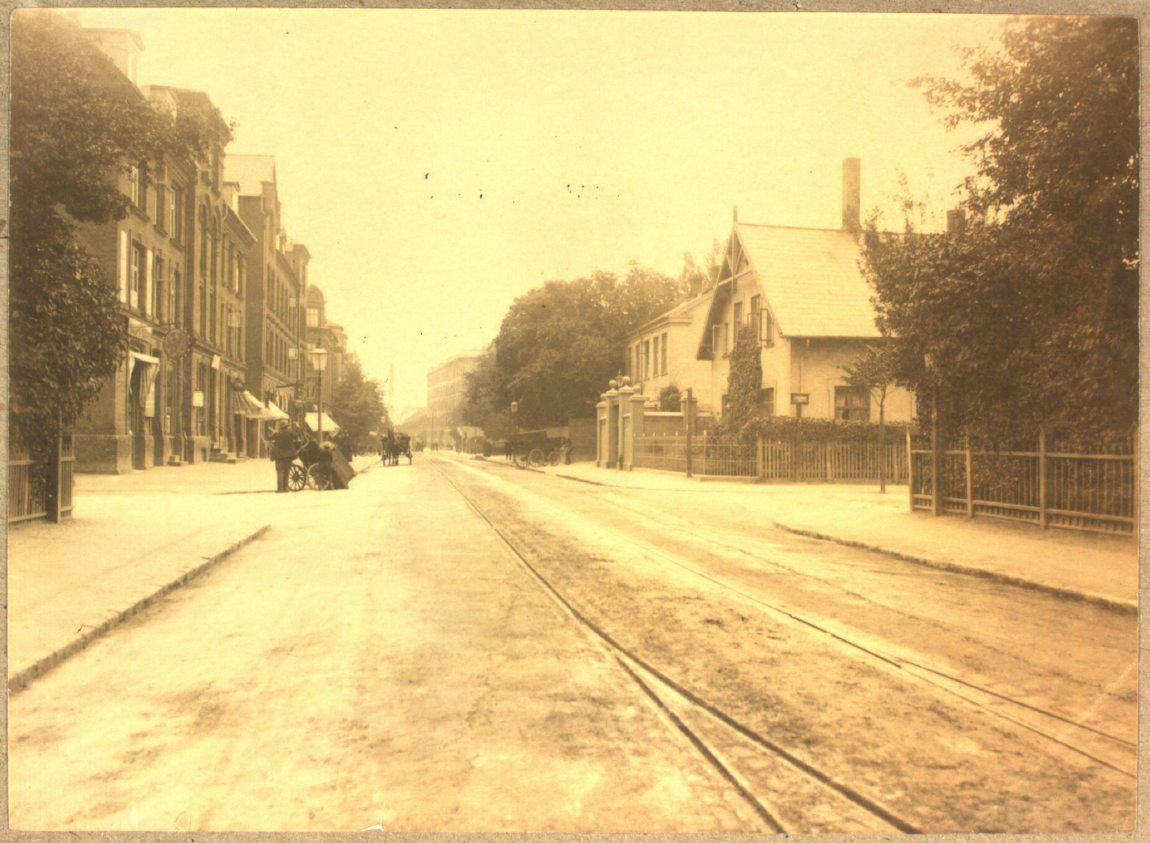
Niels Ebbesens Vej, 1899

One of the first houses on the road was located at the corner of Lykkesholms Allé. It was later converted into a maid's school, Den Praktiske Tjenestepigeskole. It relocated to new premises at Emiliegade in 1875.

Kjøbenhavns Forstæders Sporveisselskab's Blegdamsvej Line began operations in 1872. The trams passed through Niels Ebbesens Vej on their way from Trianglen in Østerbro to Gammel Kongevej. Niels Ebbesens Vej School opened at No 10 in 1877.

== Notable buildings ==
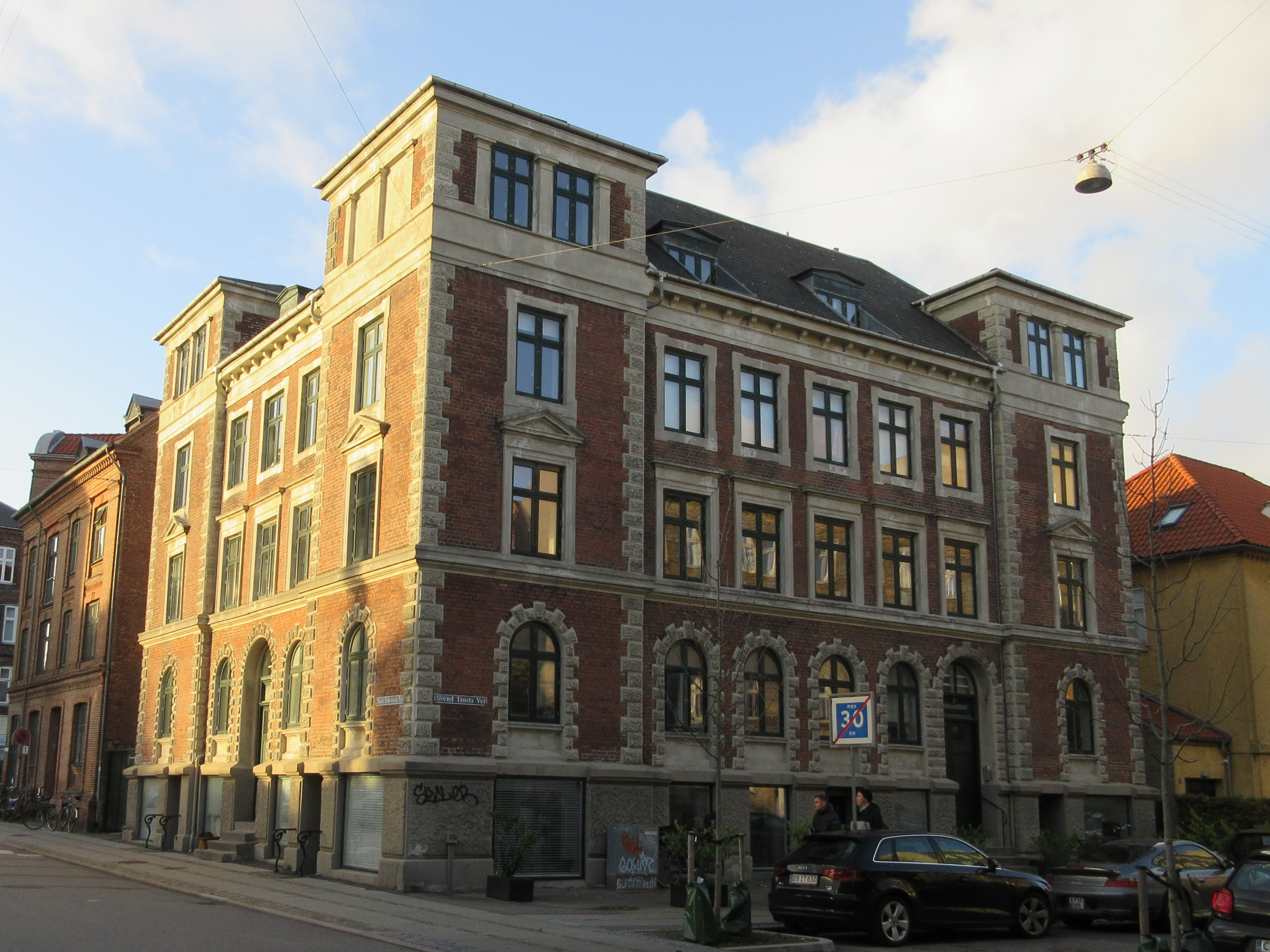
Niels Ebbesens Vej 16

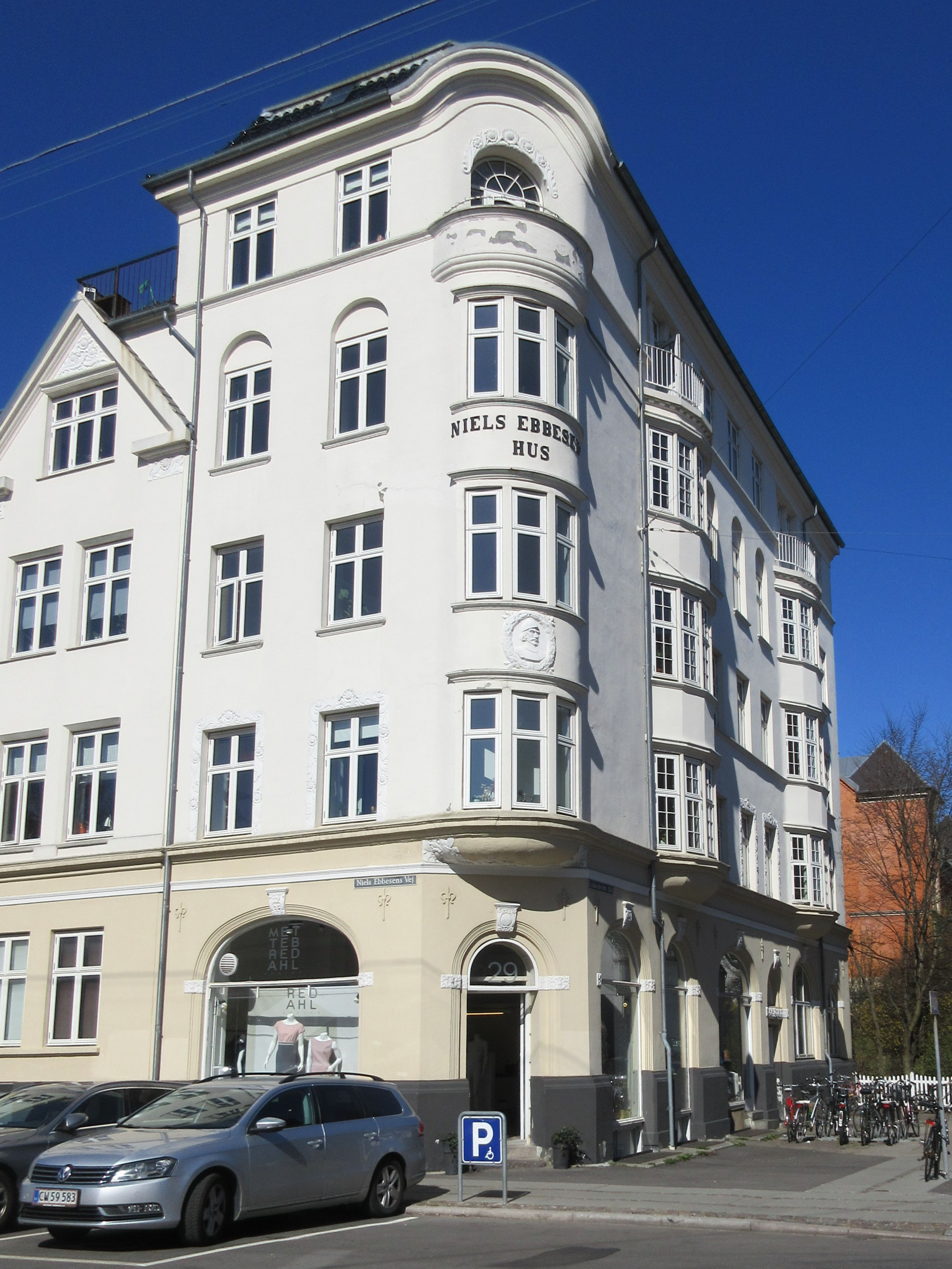
No. 24: Niels Ebbesen House

No. 16 is from 1870 and was designed by Johan Andreas Stillmann (1822–1875). Bo, 15 is from 1871. The corner building at No. 24, known as Niels Ebbesens Hus (Niels Ebbesen's House"), is also from the early 1870ss.

The former Niels Ebbesen's School (No. 10) housed Frederiksberg Gymnasium from 1992 to 2004. The buildings are now operated as a public primary school under the name Skolen ved Søerne ("The School by the Lakes"). The oldest of its buildings from 1876 to 1877 was designed by Harald Drewsen (1836–1878). Its gymnastics building was designed by Christian Laurits Thuren (1846–1826).

== Transport ==
The nearest metro station is Forum.

== See also ==
- Sankt Knuds Vej
