= Skolen ved Søerne =

Public primary school in Copenhagen, Denmark

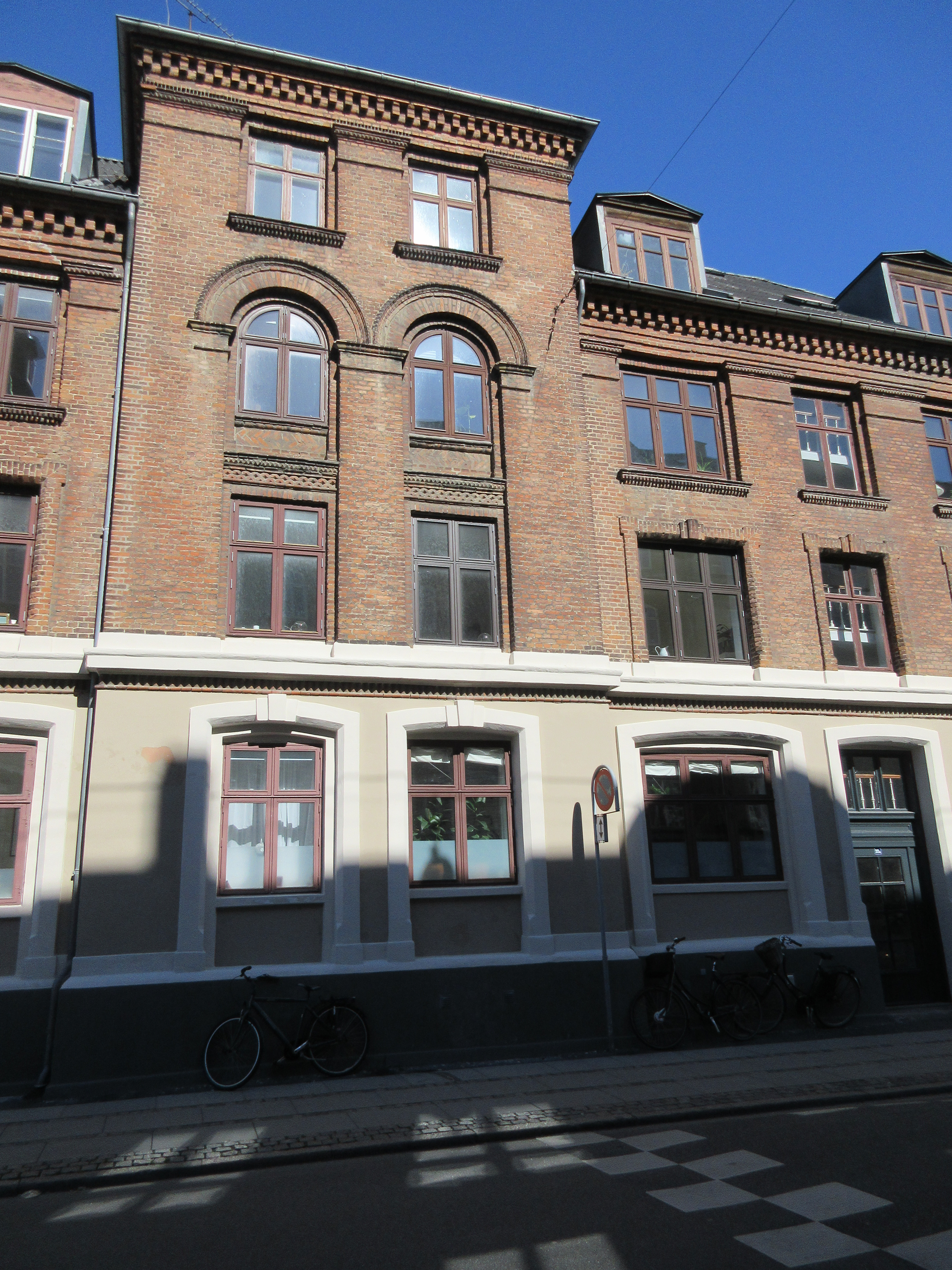
The school's Niels Ebbesens Vej Campus

Skolen ved Søerne (lit. "The School by the Lakes") is a public primary school operated by Frederiksberg Municipality at two sites in the Vordrofsvej Quarter of Frederiksberg, Greater Copenhagen, Denmark. It takes its name after The Lakes.

The school offers reception classes, 1 through 10 grades and after-school activities in the Skolefritidsordning (Sfo). The Niels Ebbesens Vej Campus, located at Niels Ebbesens Vej 10, is home to 0 - 5 grade. The Filippavej Campus, located onj the other side of Vodroffsvej, houses 6-9 grade.

== History ==
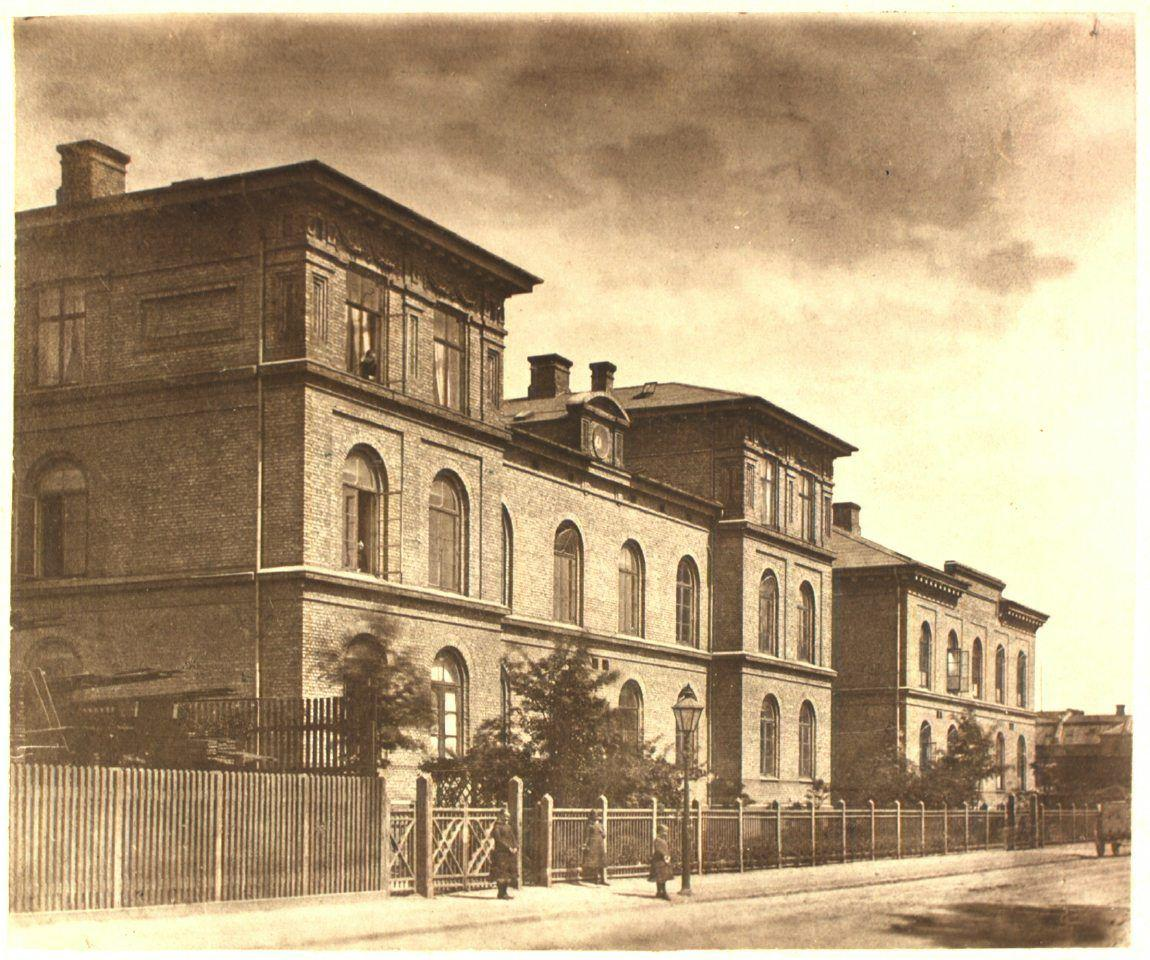
Niels Ebbesens Vej School, c.

The population of the new Frederiksberg Municipality grew rapidly in the last part of the 19th century and a new public primary school was therefore on average opened every five years. Niels Ebbesens Vej School opened at Niels Ebbesens Vej 10 in 1877. It was later expanded several times.

The buildings were in 1991 taken over by Frederiksberg Gymnasium. Frederiksberg Gymnasium left the premises when it occupied its new building at Falkoner Plads in 2005. A new primary school was then established at the site.

== Today ==
The school's Niels Ebbesens Vej Campus, home to 0-5 grade, is based at Niels Ebbesens Gade 10. The oldesty of the buildings is from 1877 and was designed by Harald Drewsen (1836-1878). The gymnastics building was designed by Christian Laurits Thuren (1846-1826). The schoolyard and part of the adjacent greenspace Vodroffslund were redesigned in 2018-19.
