= Lykkesholms Allé =

Street in Frederiksberg, Denmark

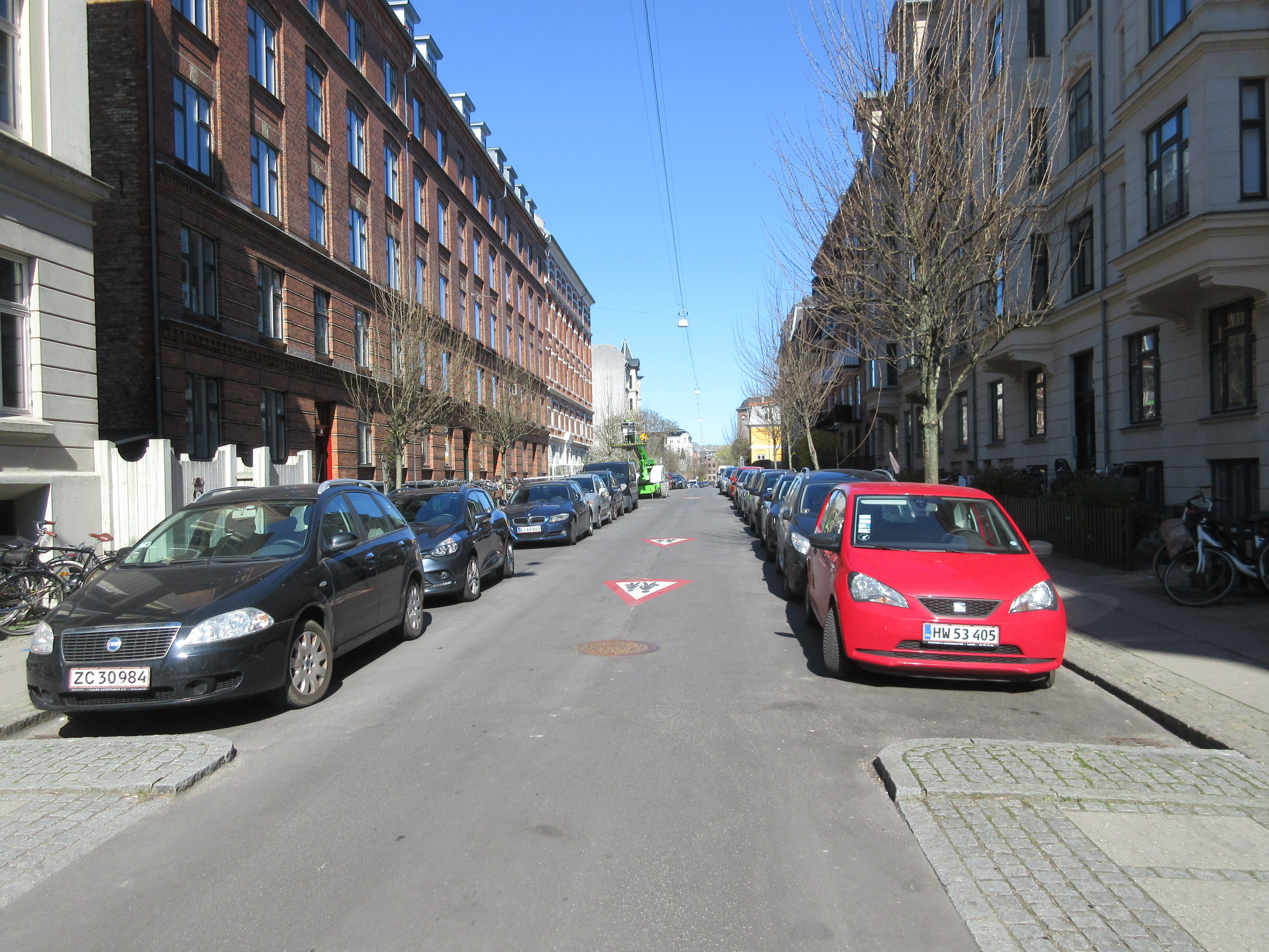
- Interactive map of Lykkesholms Allé
- Length: 516 m (1,693 ft)
- Location: Copenhagen, Denmark
- Quarter: Frederiksberg
- Postal code: 1619, 1902. 1011
- Nearest metro station: Frederiksberg Allé
- Coordinates: 55°40′39.06″N 12°32′53.66″E
- South end: Gammel Kongevej
- North end: Danasvej

Lykkesholms Allé is a street in the Frederiksberg district of Copenhagen, Denmark. It runs from Gammel Kongevej in the south to Danasvej in the north and is intersected by Niels Ebbesens Vej.

== History ==
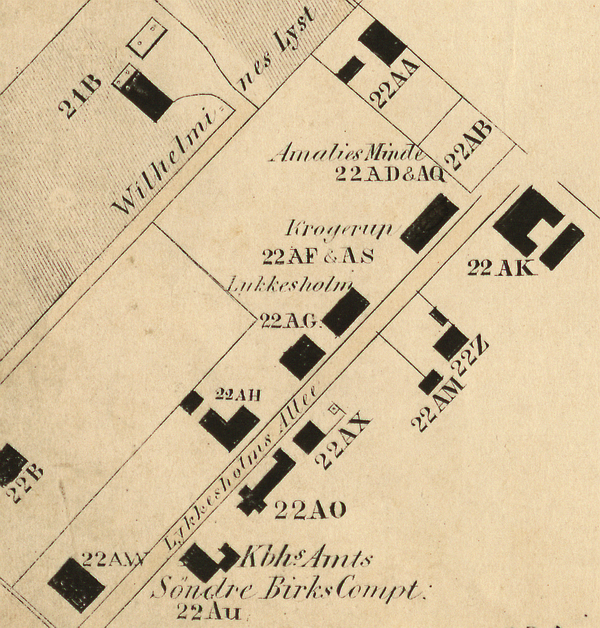
The street seen on a map detail from the 1850s

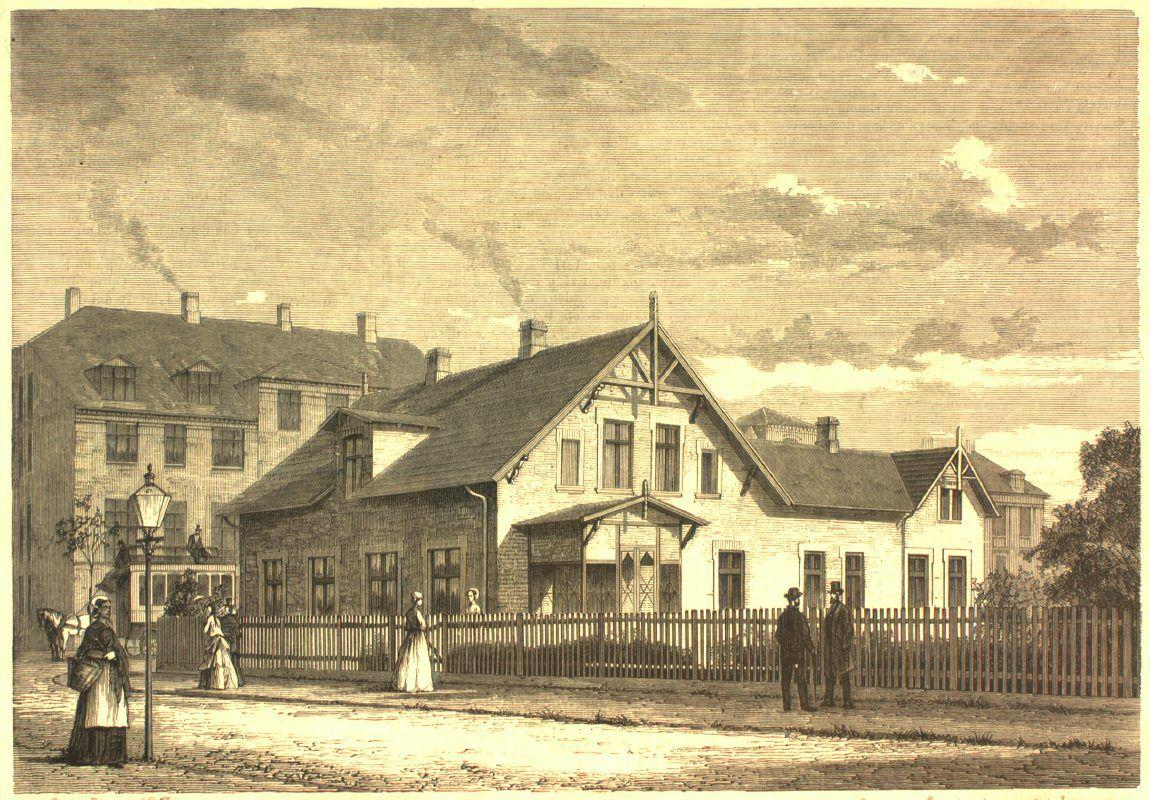
The Practical Maids' School in 1873

The land where the street is located was acquired by the composer Emil Horneman who had become moderately wealthy through his thriving music business and second marriage. He created the street in around 1850. It was named after the country house Lykkesholm which was, however, not located at the site but at present-day Tesdorpfsvej. The street was initially named Lykkesholmsvej but this name was changed to Lykkesholms Allé in 1890. Horneman was together with Georg Carstensen also an investor in the nearby entertainment venue Alhambra.

Den Praktiske Tjenestepigeskole, a maids' school, was located at the corner of Lykkesholms Allé and Niels Ebbesens Bej. It relocated to new premises at Emiliegade in 1875. G. J. V. Bense operated a timber retail business in the courtyard of No. 11 from circa 1896 to 1904.

== Buildings ==
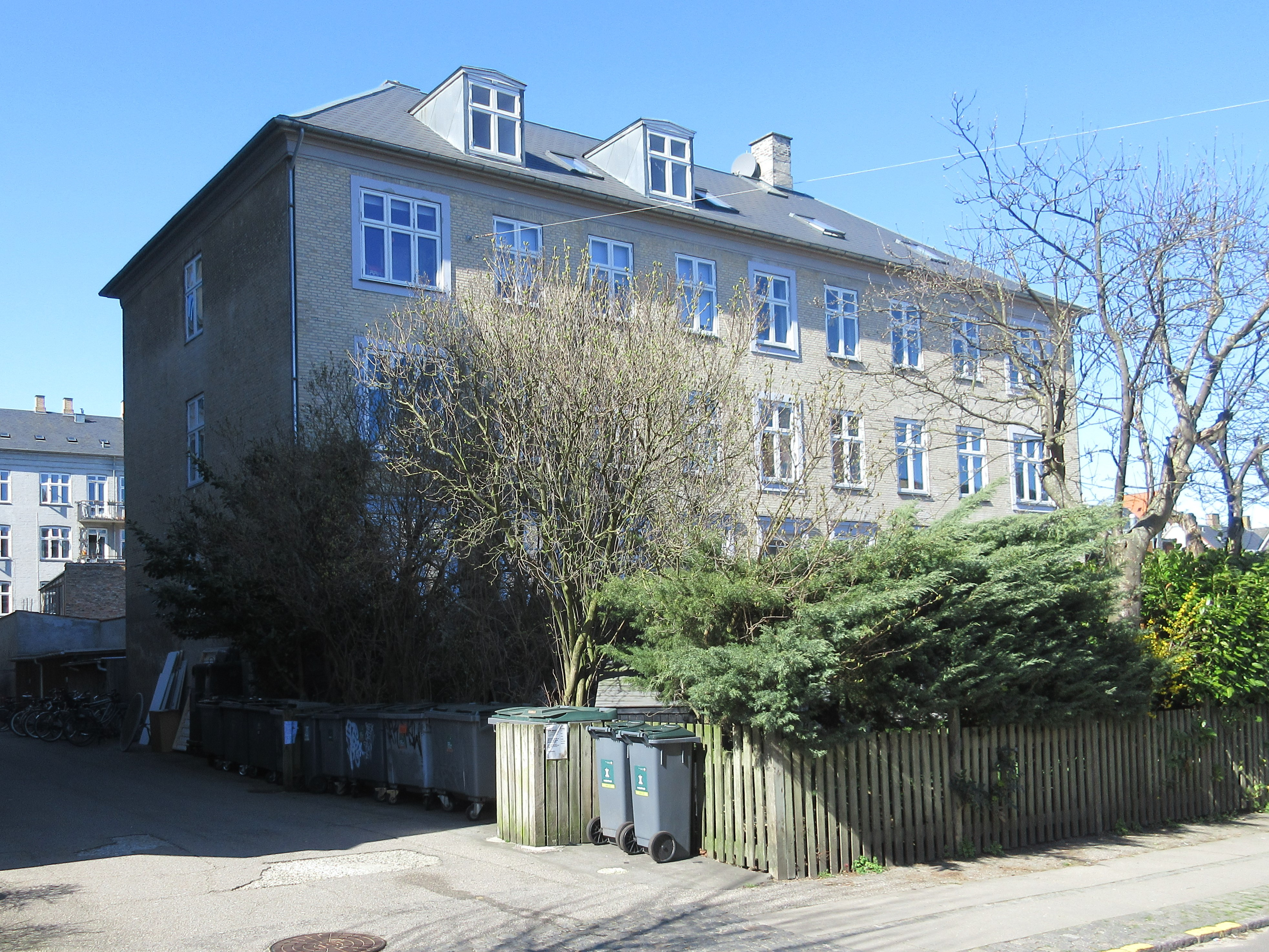
No. 11: Amaliehåb

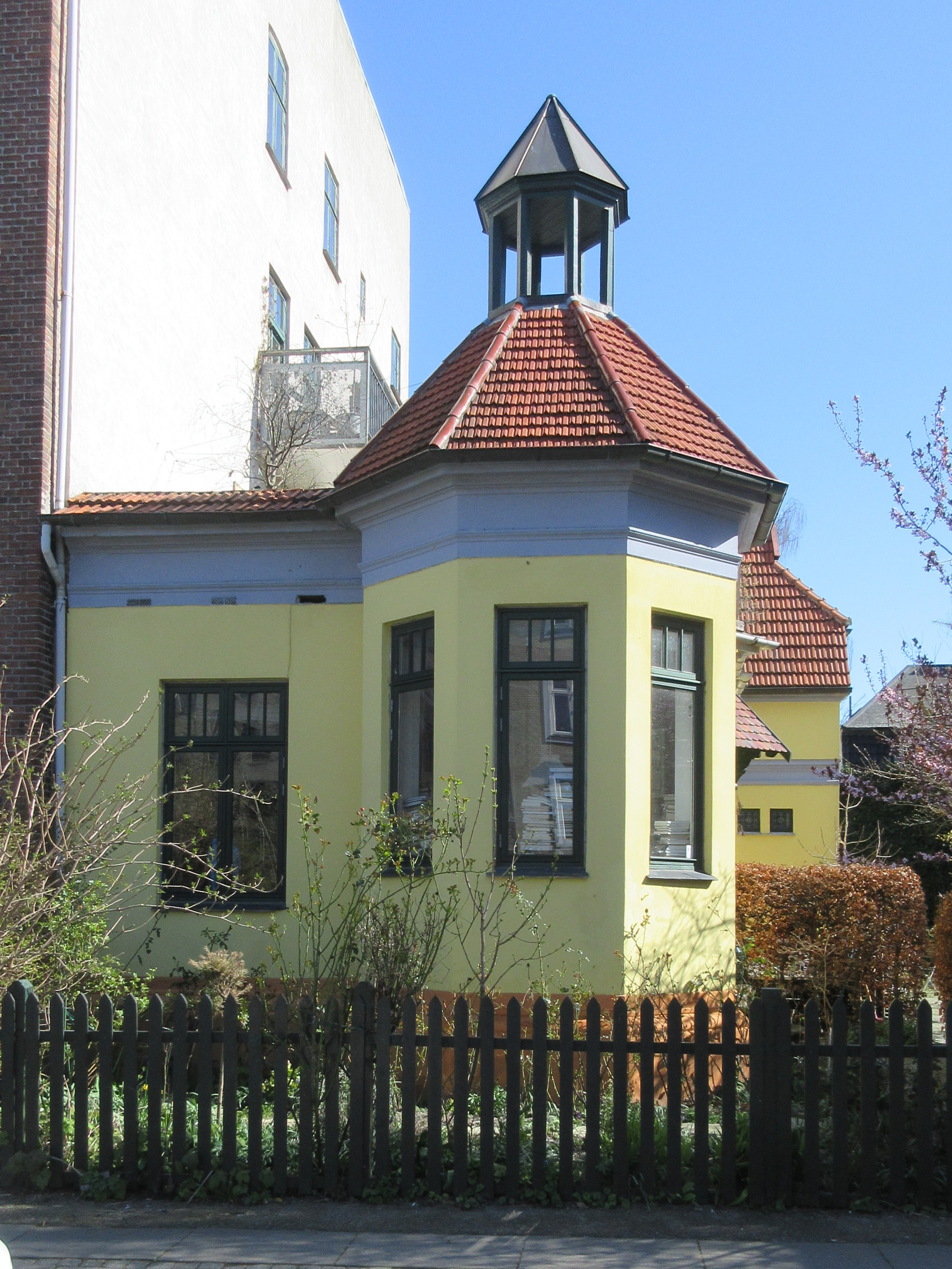
Pavilion at No. 15

Amaliehåb (No. 11) was built in 1852–53 by two master carpenters named Hasenjäger and Schütte. They named the building after the landowner, Amalie Jensen. Krogerup (No. 7) is from 1850.

Kaptajn Johnsens Skole, a private school, has been based at No. 3A since 1936.

Le Printemps (No. 13), a house from 1870, was designed by Vilhelm Dahlerup. No. 6 is from 1905 and was designed by the architect Ole Boye.

== Notable people ==
- Hans Vilhelm Kaalundm poet, spent his last years at No. 7.
- Erik Bøghm journalist and playwright, lived at No. 3A ub 1891–99.
- Gotfred Christensenm landscape painter, lived at No. 8 in 1879–88.
- Harald Foss, landscape painter, lived for many years at No. 15.

== See also ==
- Forhåbningsholms Allé
