= Immanuel Church, Copenhagen =

Immanuel Church
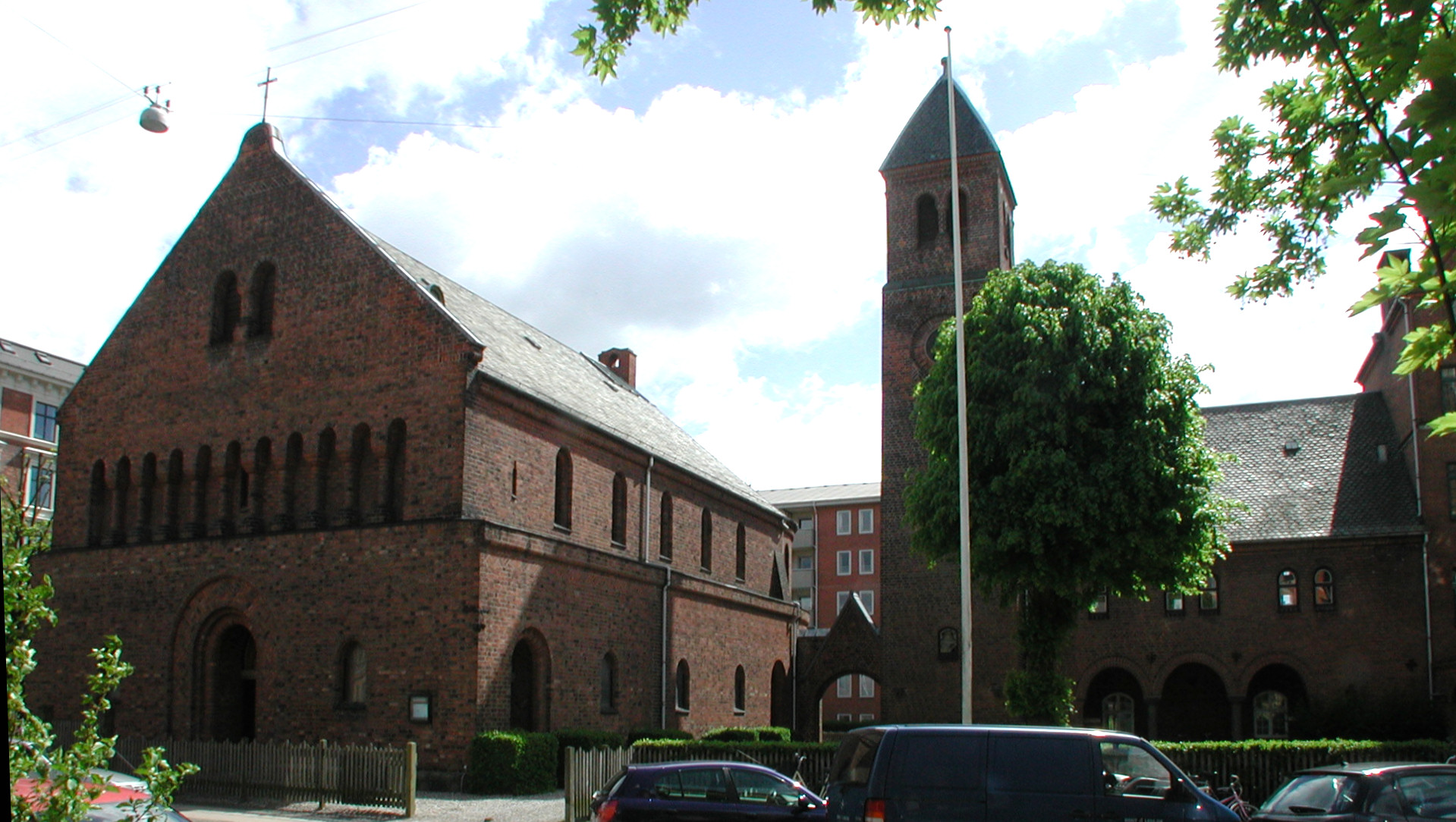
- Church of Christ seen from across the street
- Immanuel Church
- 55°40′35.9″N 12°33′4″E
- Location: 20A Forhåbningsholms Alle; Frederiksberg, Copenhagen
- Country: Denmark
- Denomination: Church of Denmark

History
- Status: Church

Architecture
- Architect: Andreas Clemmensen
- Architectural type: Church
- Groundbreaking: 1892
- Completed: 1893 (tower: 1905)

Specifications
- Capacity: 400 seats
- Materials: Brick

Administration
- Archdiocese: Diocese of Copenhagen

Immanuel Church is a church at Forhåbningsholms Allé 20 in the Frederiksberg district of Copenhagen, Denmark. It belongs to Københavns Valgmenighed, a Grundtvigian congregation under Church of Denmark. The building was designed by Andreas Clemmesen and completed in 1893. The artists Niels and Joakim Skovgaard and Niels Larsen Stevns, all three members of the congregation, decorated the church building together with a group of other artists, providing a series of glass mosaics above the entrances as well as the church furnishings. The church is built as a typical danish Gesamtkunstwerk in skønvirke style.

== History ==
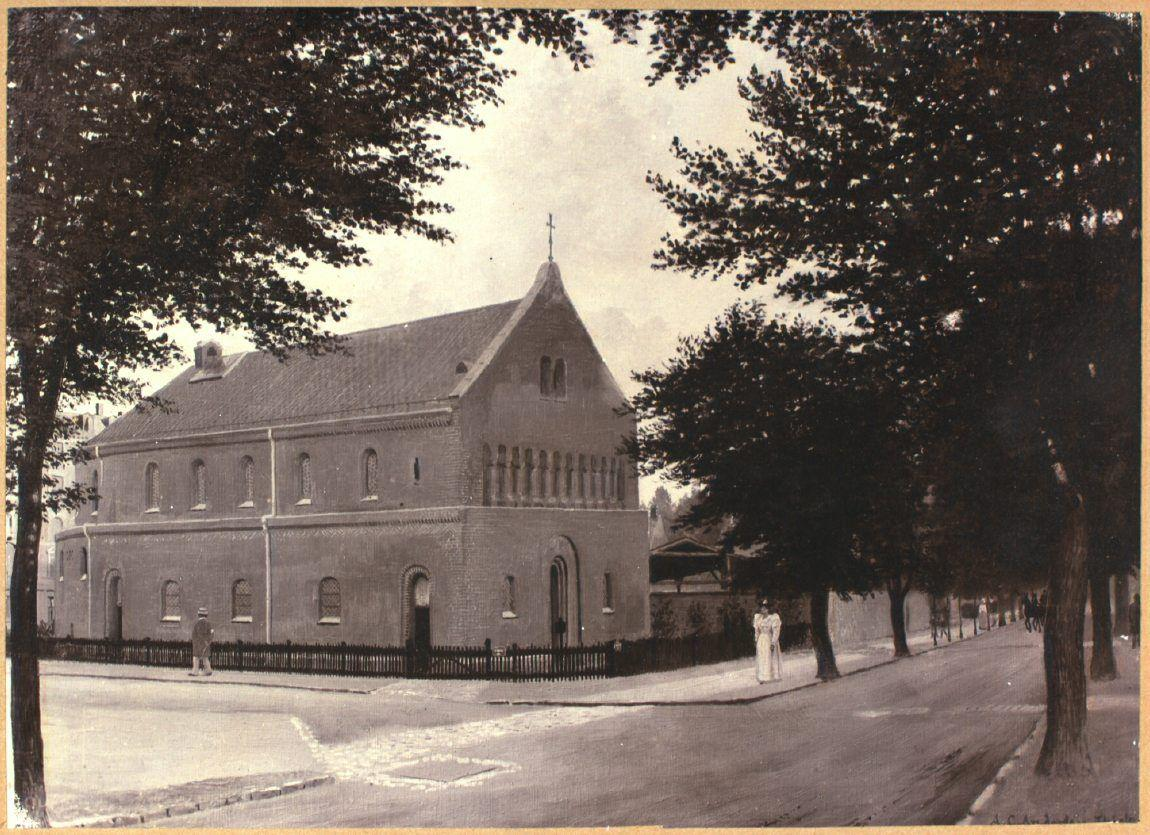
The church in 1895

The church was built for the first Grundtvigian congregation in Denmark which had separated from the Vartov congregation. The congregation first assembled at a local folk high school on Cjr. Winters Vej, but soon began construction of the new church which was consecrated on 29 October 1893. The detached clock tower was designed by af R. V. Rue in 1904 and completed in 1905 together with some of the surrounding features.

== Architecture ==
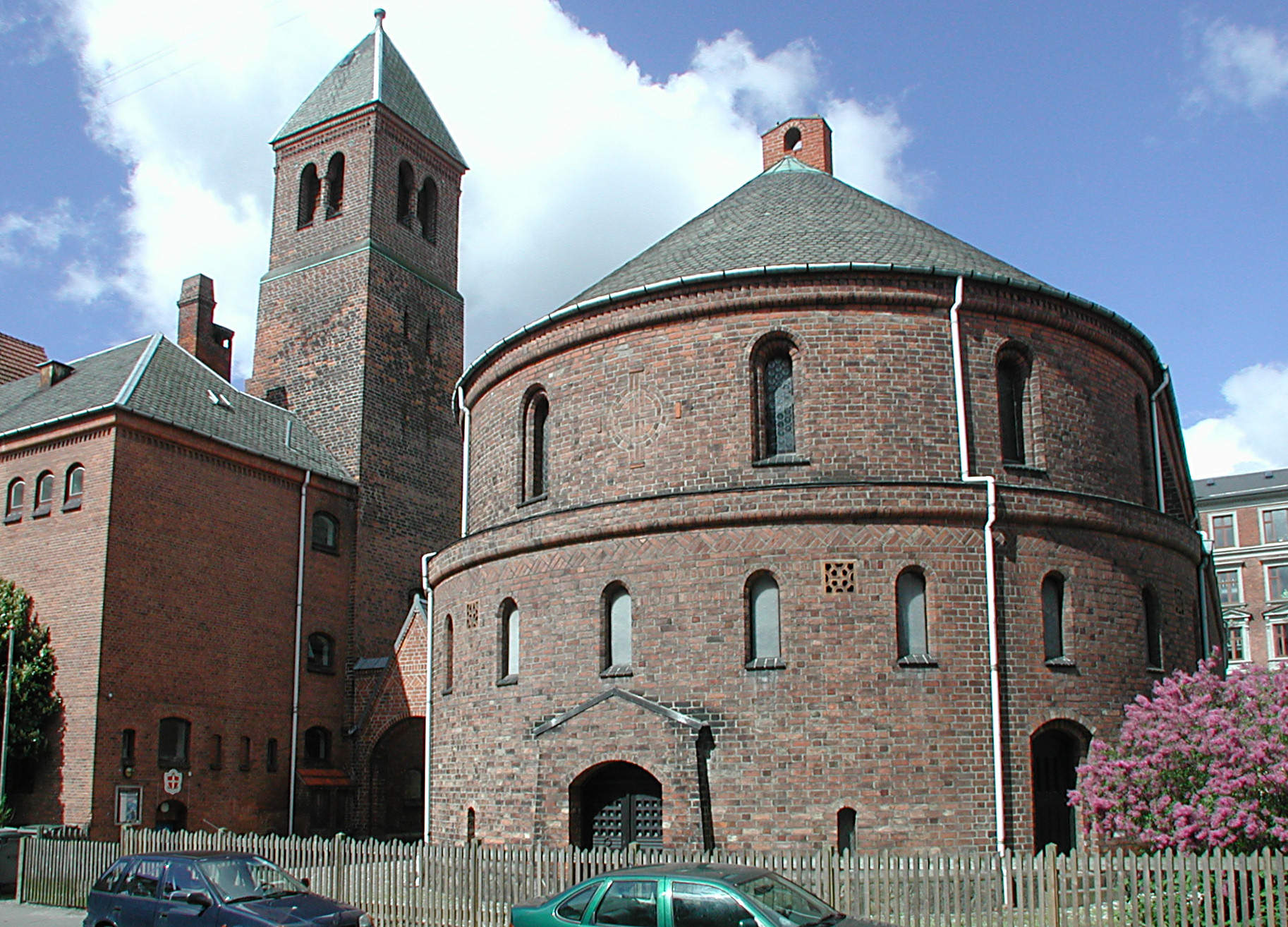
The semi-circular choir seen from the east

The church is built in large red brick of the type in Denmark known as Munkesten in a Romanesque Revival style inspired by Italian churches in Ravenna and Siena. It is a rectangular building under a barrel vaulted roof with a semi-circular choir to the east.

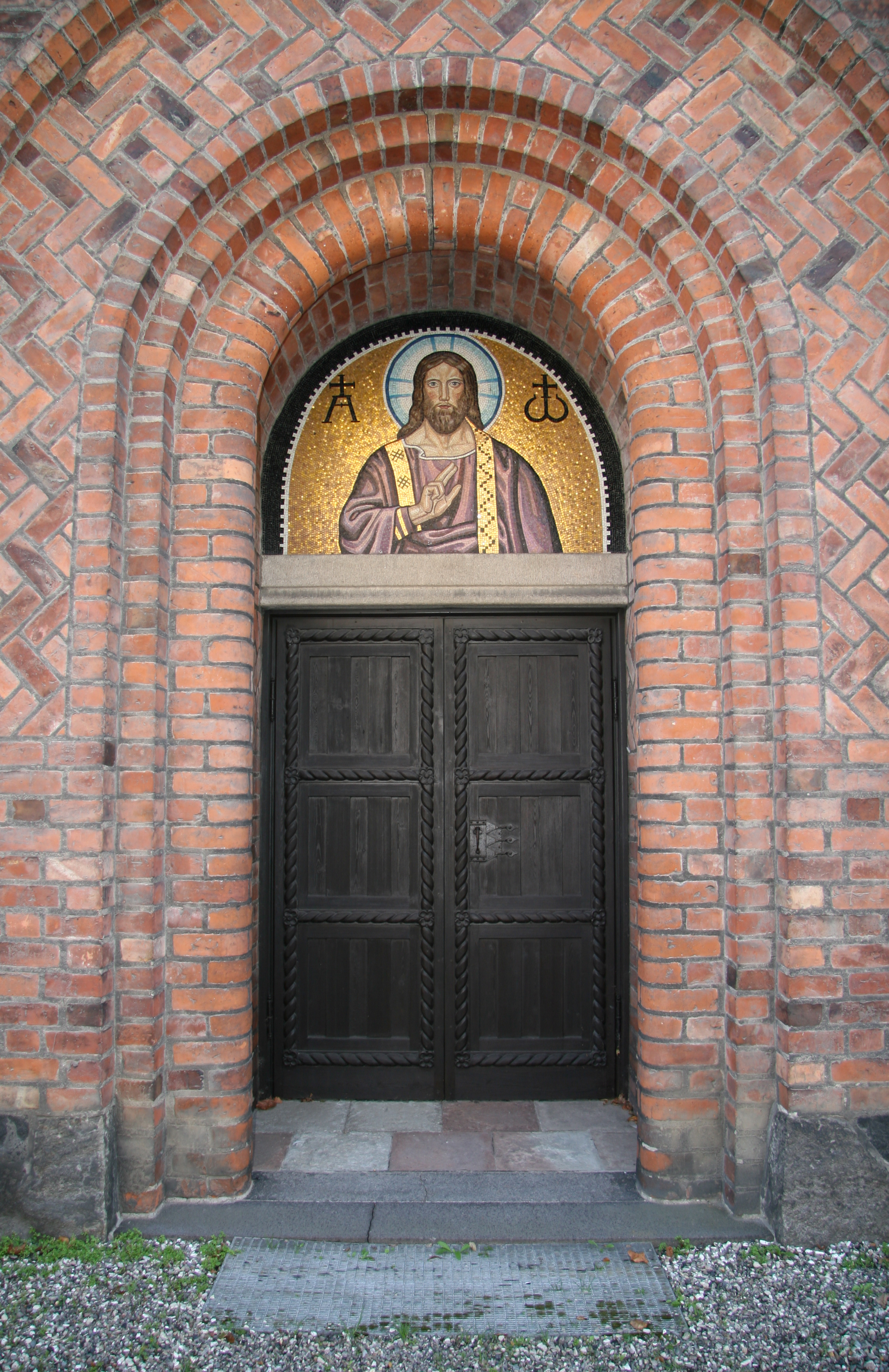
The main entrance in the western gable

The round-arched entrance is located in the west gable. It has a tympanum with a glass mosaic. Four additional entrances, two on each side of the building, also have glass mosaics in their tympana. The eastern mosaic on the south side was designed by Niels Skovgaard, while the rest are by Joakim Skovgaard. The north and south sides also have double-height windows. There is a blinded, ornamental gallery with 11 arches supported by columns above the main entrance on the west gable, and even further up a double, round-arched opening.

== Interior and furnishings ==
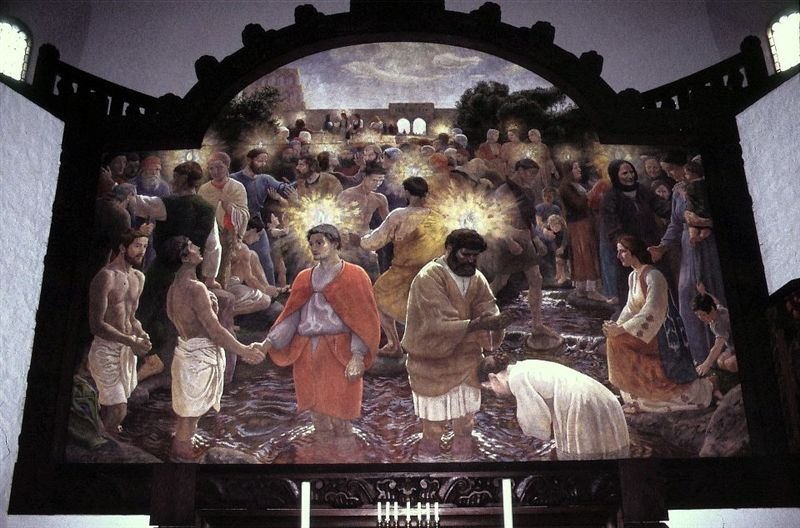
The altarpiece

The altarpiece features a painting by Niels Skovgaard with an intricately decorated wooden frame carved by Poul S. Christiansen, Johannes Kragh og Niels Larsen Stevns. The front of the altar table is designed by Niels Skovgaard. The altar carpet,—decorated with lilies and crocuses, was designed by Joakim Skovgaard. The organ was made by A. H. Buch and dates from 1896.

Other decorative features include several reliefs of religious subjects by Joakim Skovgaard, Niels Skovgaard and Christian C. Peters (who produced a cast of an original from 1867 in Marvede Church).

== Cultural references ==
Bente's (Bodil Jørgensen) and Gorm's (Bjarne Henriksen) wedding ceremony in the 2000 Morten Korch-film Fruen på Hamre was shot in the church.

== Gallery ==
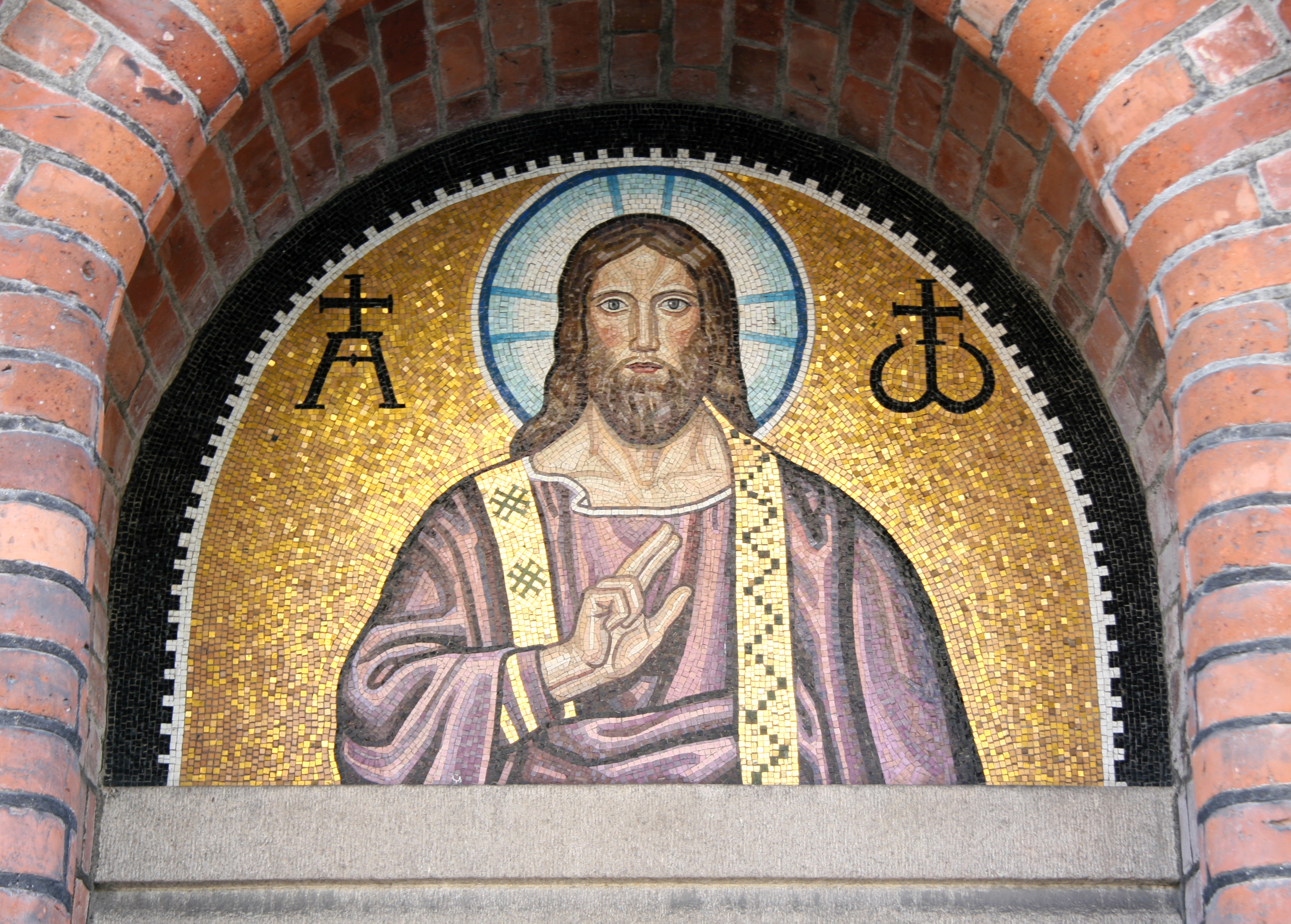
The mosaic above the main entrance

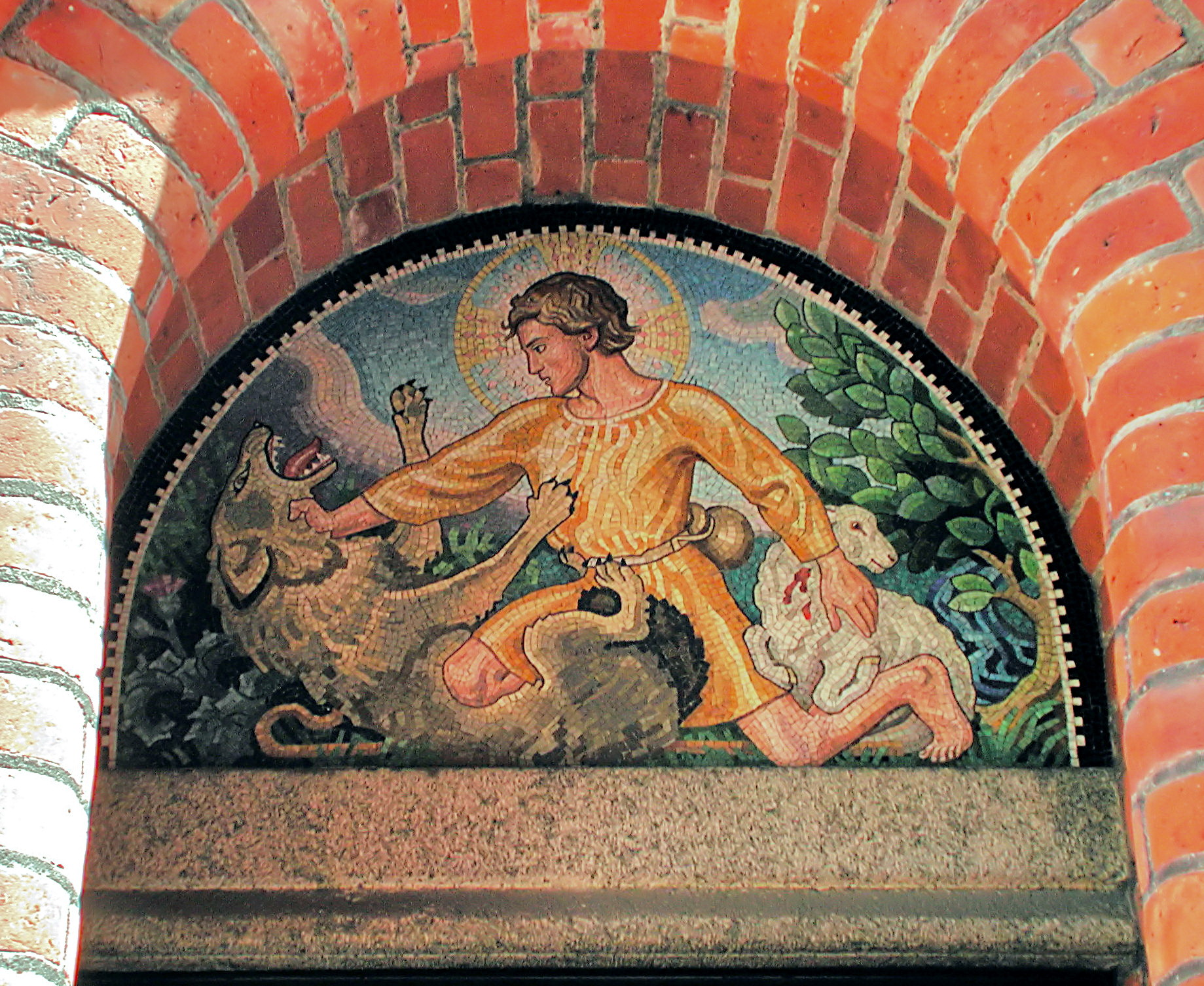
The mosaic above the south-east door

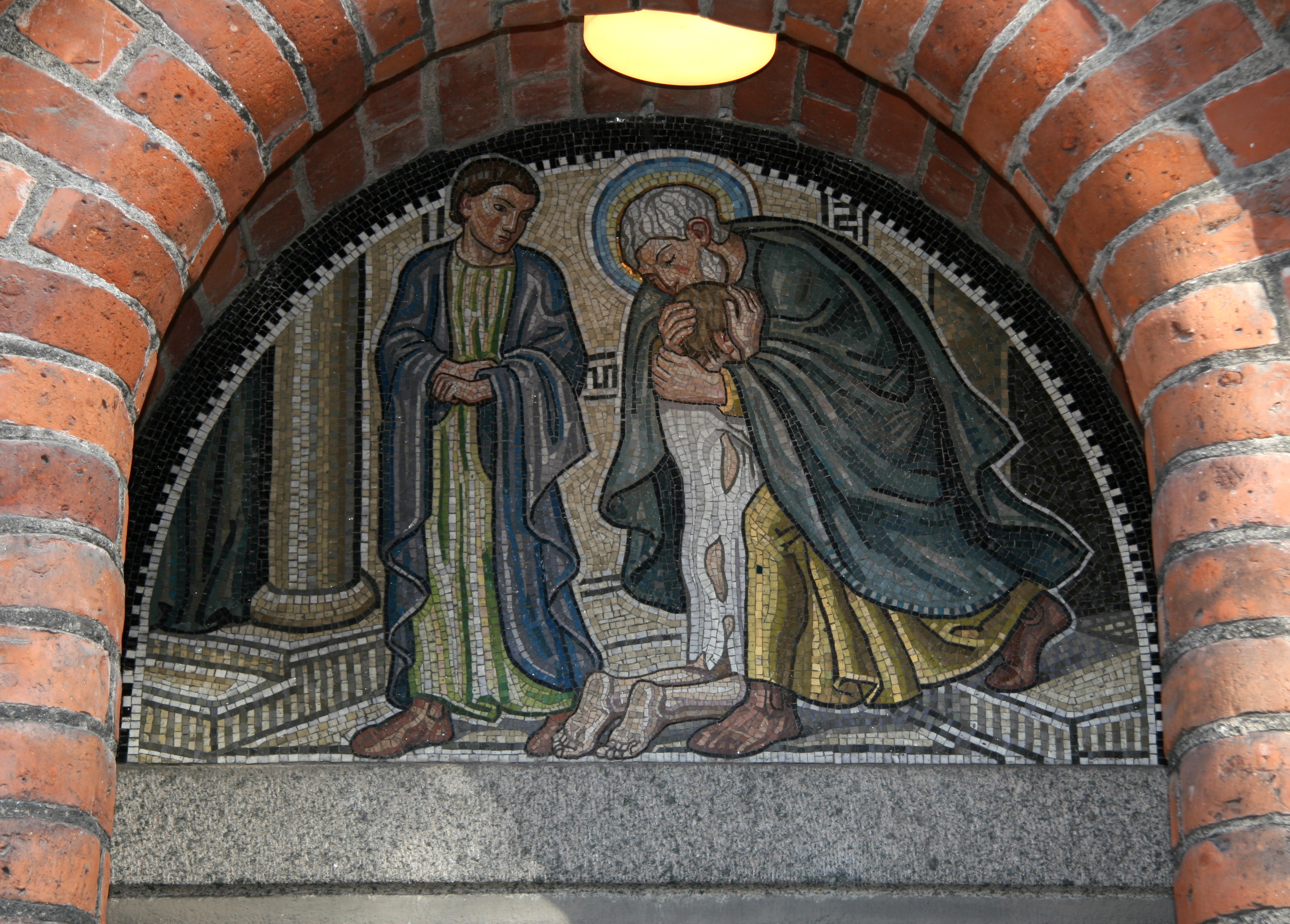
The mosaic above the south-west door

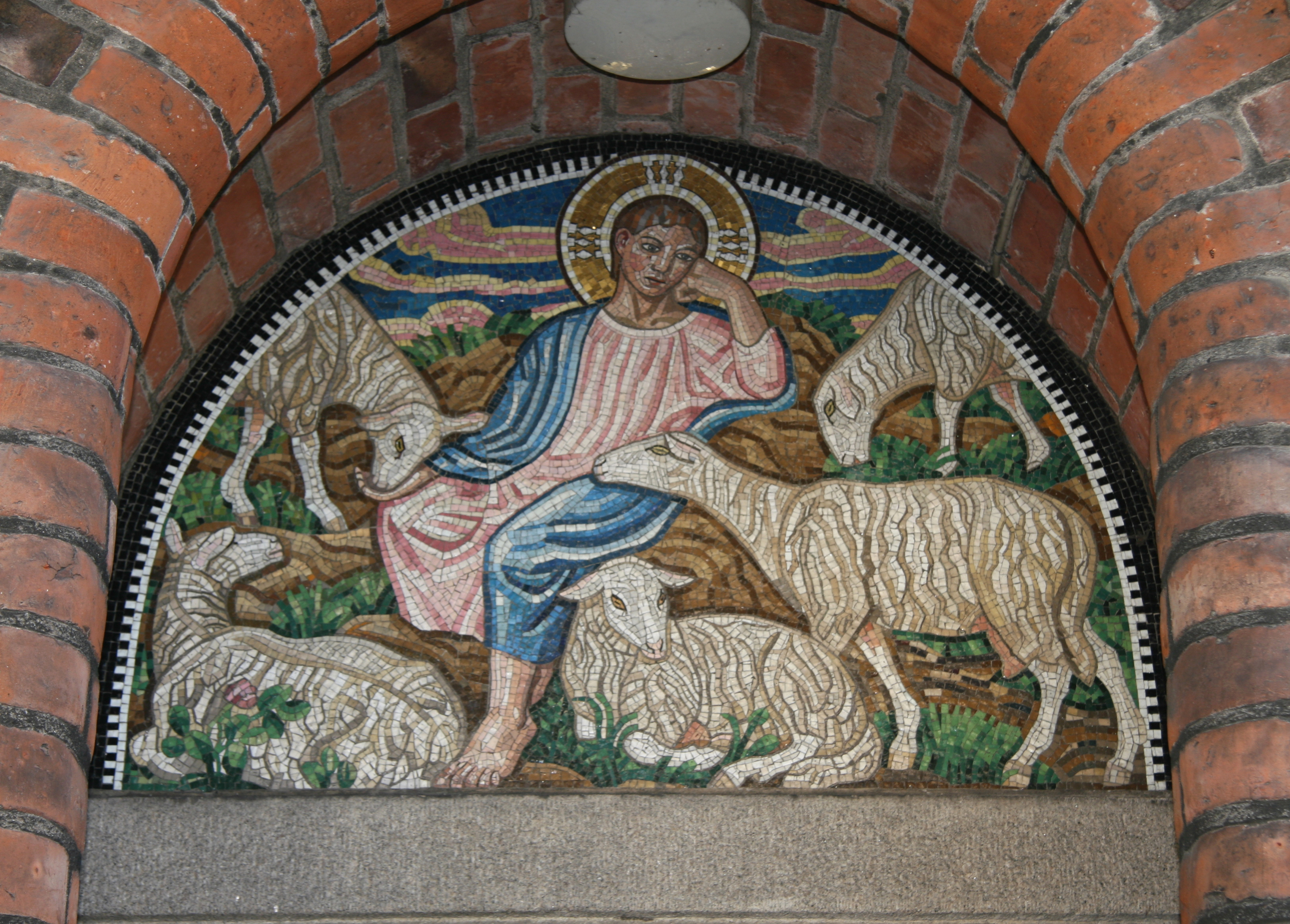
The mosaic above the north-west door

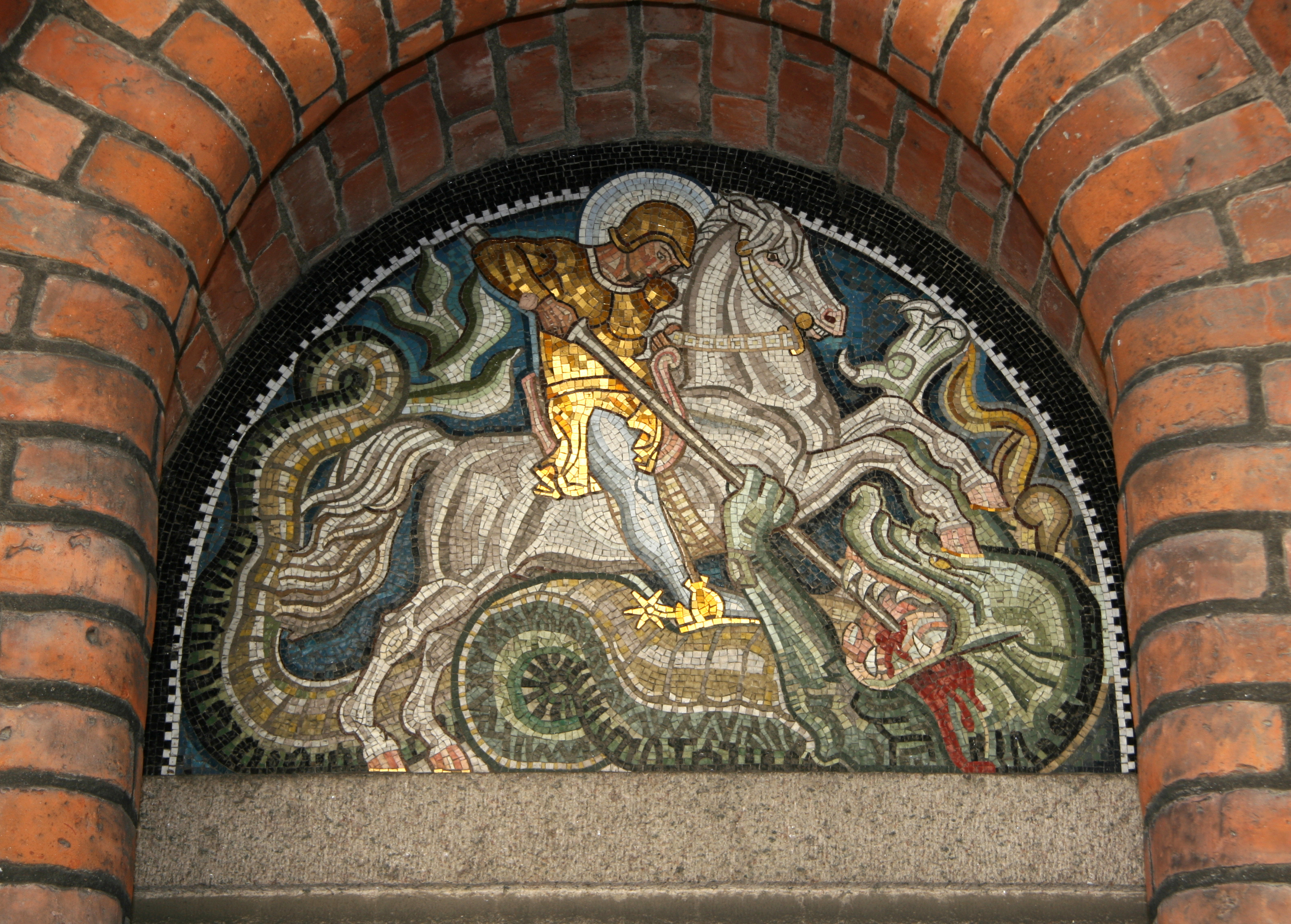
The mosaic above the north-east door
