= Kristian Arentzen =

Danish author

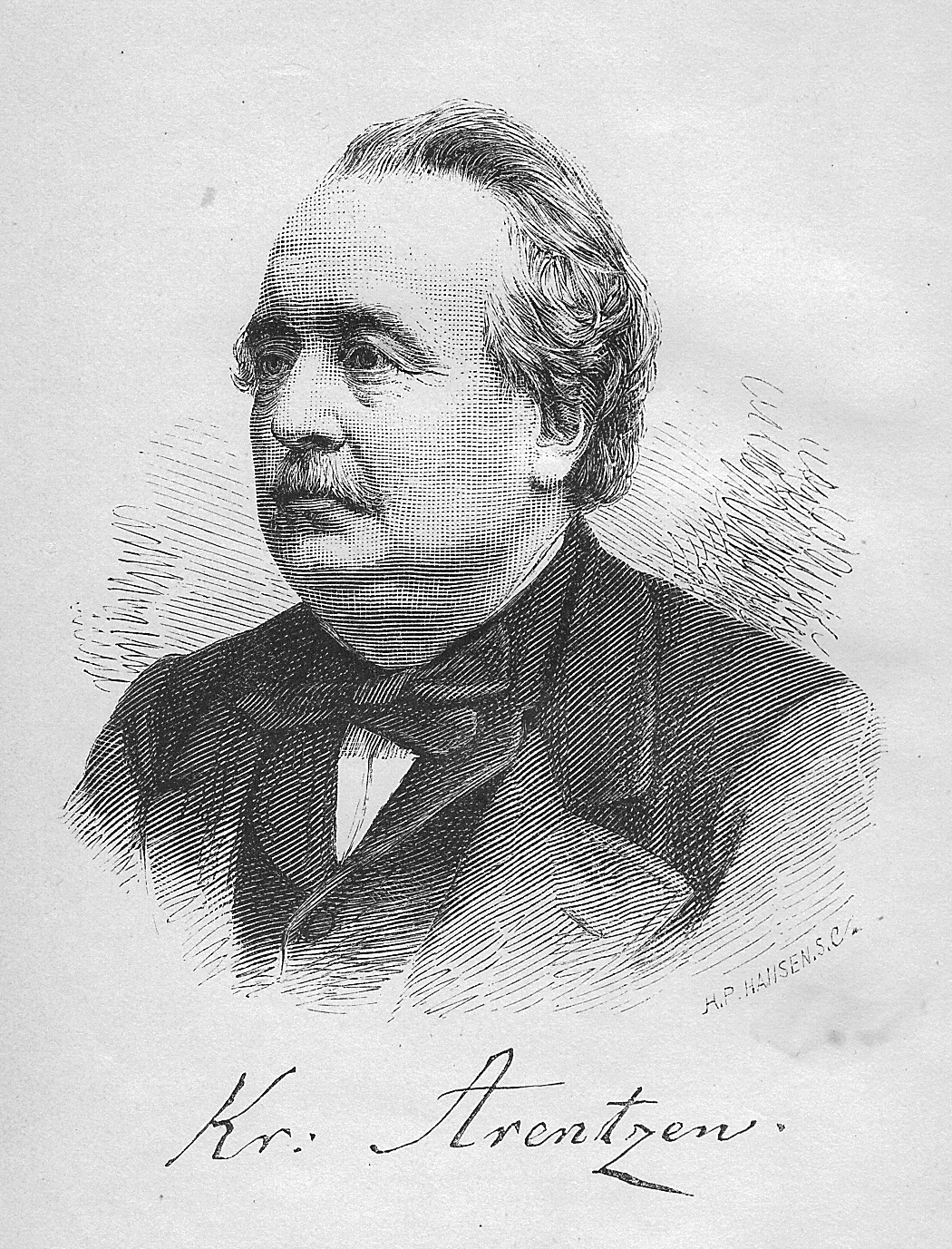
Kristian Arentzen

Kristian August Emil Arentzen (10 November 1823 – 30 December 1899) was a Danish writer, literary historian and educator.

== Biography ==
Arentzen was born in Copenhagen, Denmark. He was the son of Gunder August Arentzen and Marie Elisabeth Smidt. In 1841 he became a student of Det von Westenske Institut where he devoted himself to the study of Old Norse literature. In 1852 he received state support for a study trip to Iceland. He prepared for a master's conference in aesthetics, which he submitted in 1856. In 1861, he became assistant professor at Metropolitanskolen, where he stayed until 1872. In 1879, he was appointed Knight of the Order of the Dannebrog.

In 1857, he completed his first book of poetry Et Livsstadium followed by Digtsamling in 1862 and Ny Digtsamling in 1867.

Arentzen undertook to depict the poetic age of Jens Baggesen (1764–1826), and Adam Oehlenschläger (1779–1850), a work he completed in eight volumes (Baggesen and Oehlenschläger - Litteraturhistoriske Studie, 1870–78).
