= Sankt Knuds Vej =

Street in Copenhagen, Denmark

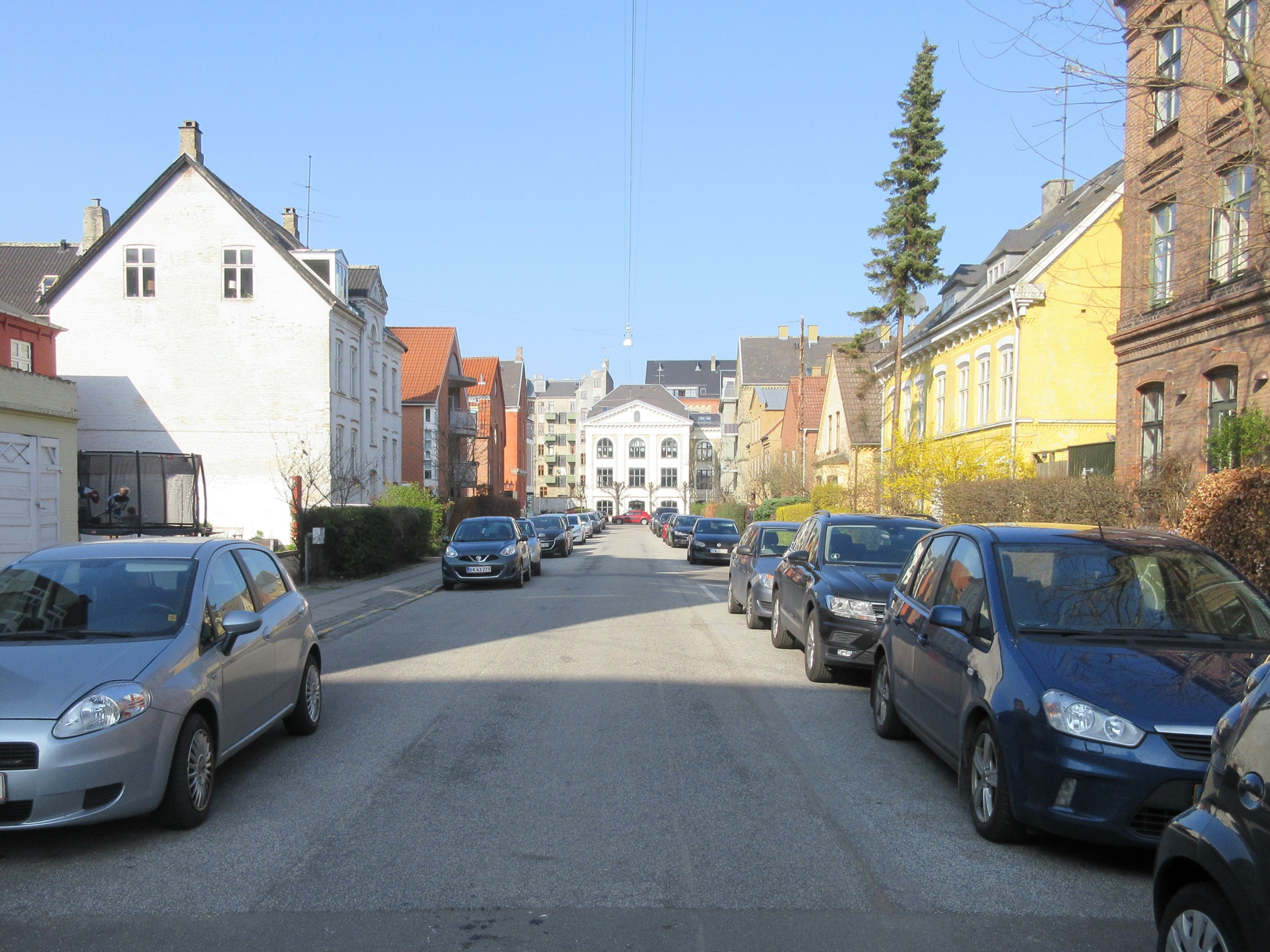
- Length: 515 m (1,690 ft)
- Location: Copenhagen, Denmark
- Quarter: Frederiksberg
- Nearest metro station: Forum
- Coordinates: 55°40′37.45″N 12°32′57.34″E
- South end: Gammel Kongevej
- Major junctions: Niels Ebbesens Vej
- West end: Danasvej

Sankt Knuds Cej (lit. " Saint Canute's Road") is a street in the Frederiksberg district of Copenhagen, Denmark. It runs from Gammel Kongevej in the south to Danasvej in the north. The street is mainly lined with late 19th and early 20th century houses, the oldest of which date from the 1860s when the street was established as part of what was then known as Frederiksberg Villa Quarter. The street is named after Saint Canute.

== History ==
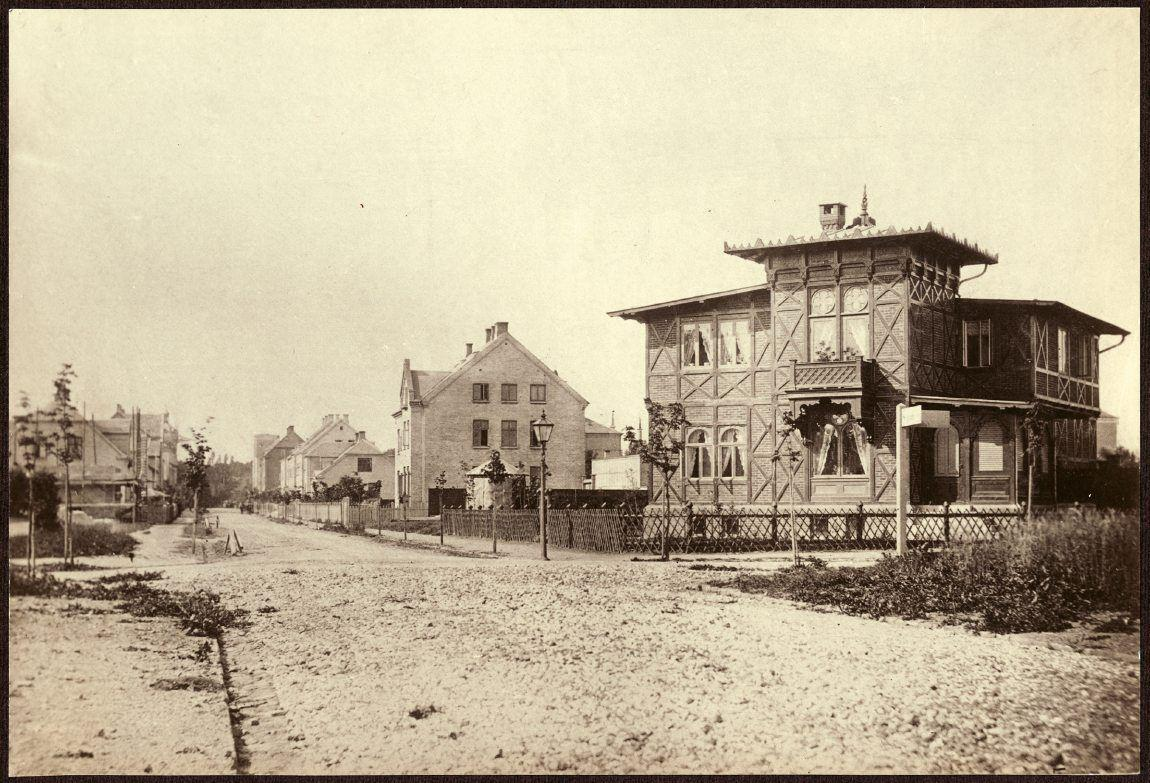
Sankt Knuds Vej in 1868 as seen from Niels Ebbesens Vej towards Gammel Kongevej

Henning Wolf, Frederiksberg's first city architect, created a masterplan for a neighbourhood of single-family detached homes on the north side of Gammel Kongevej in the 1960s. The neighbourhood was initially referred to as Frederiksberg Villa Quarter but the name passed out of use in around 1890. Sankt Knuds Gade was created in around 1867–68. It was named after Saint Canute. The name was proposed by a lot owner. The streets Platanvej, Niels Ebbesens Vej and Bernstorffsvej (now part of Danasvej) were created around the same time. Alhambravej and Hauchsvej were created in 1870.

== Notable buildings ==
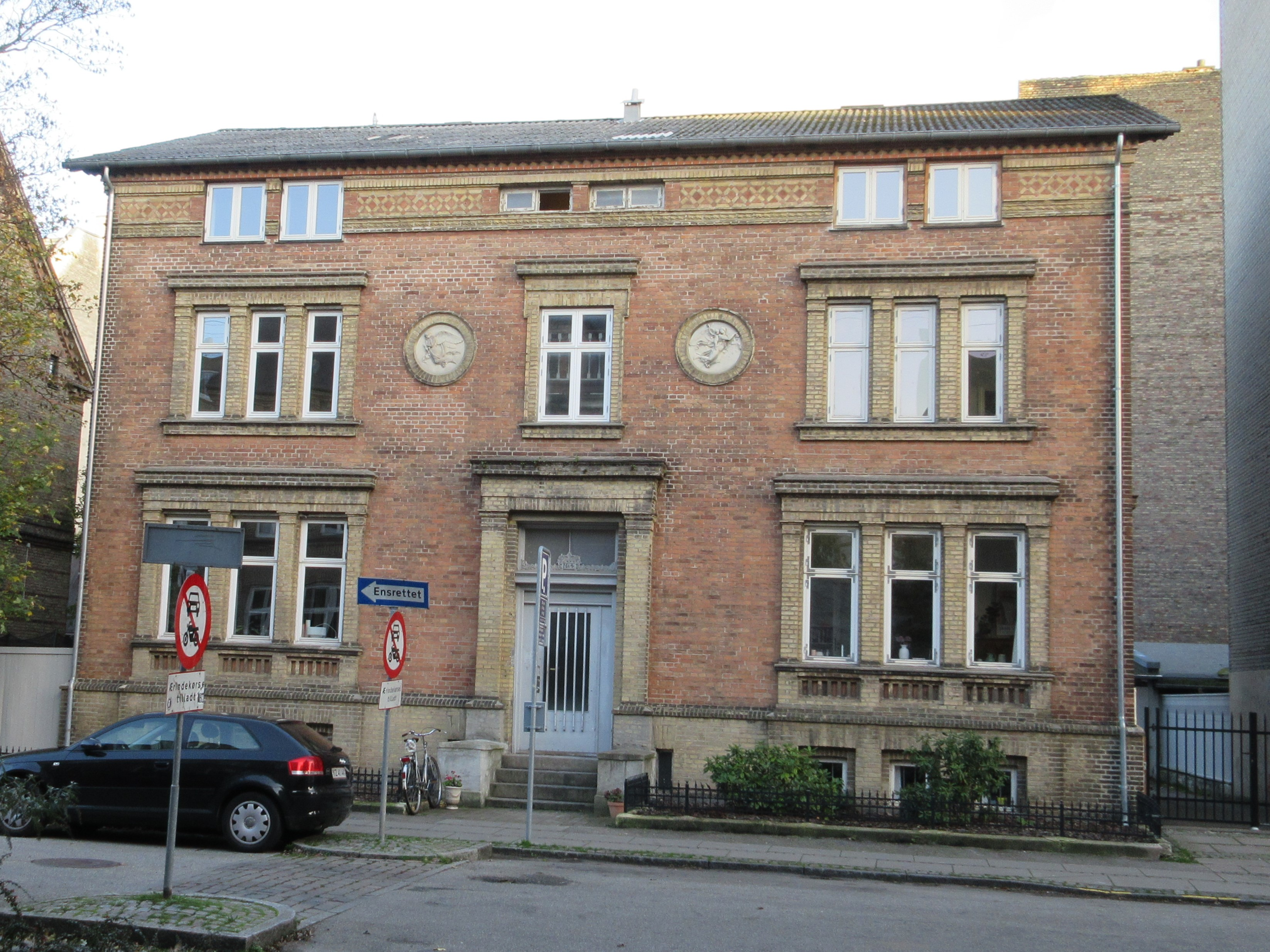
Sankt Knuds Vej 4

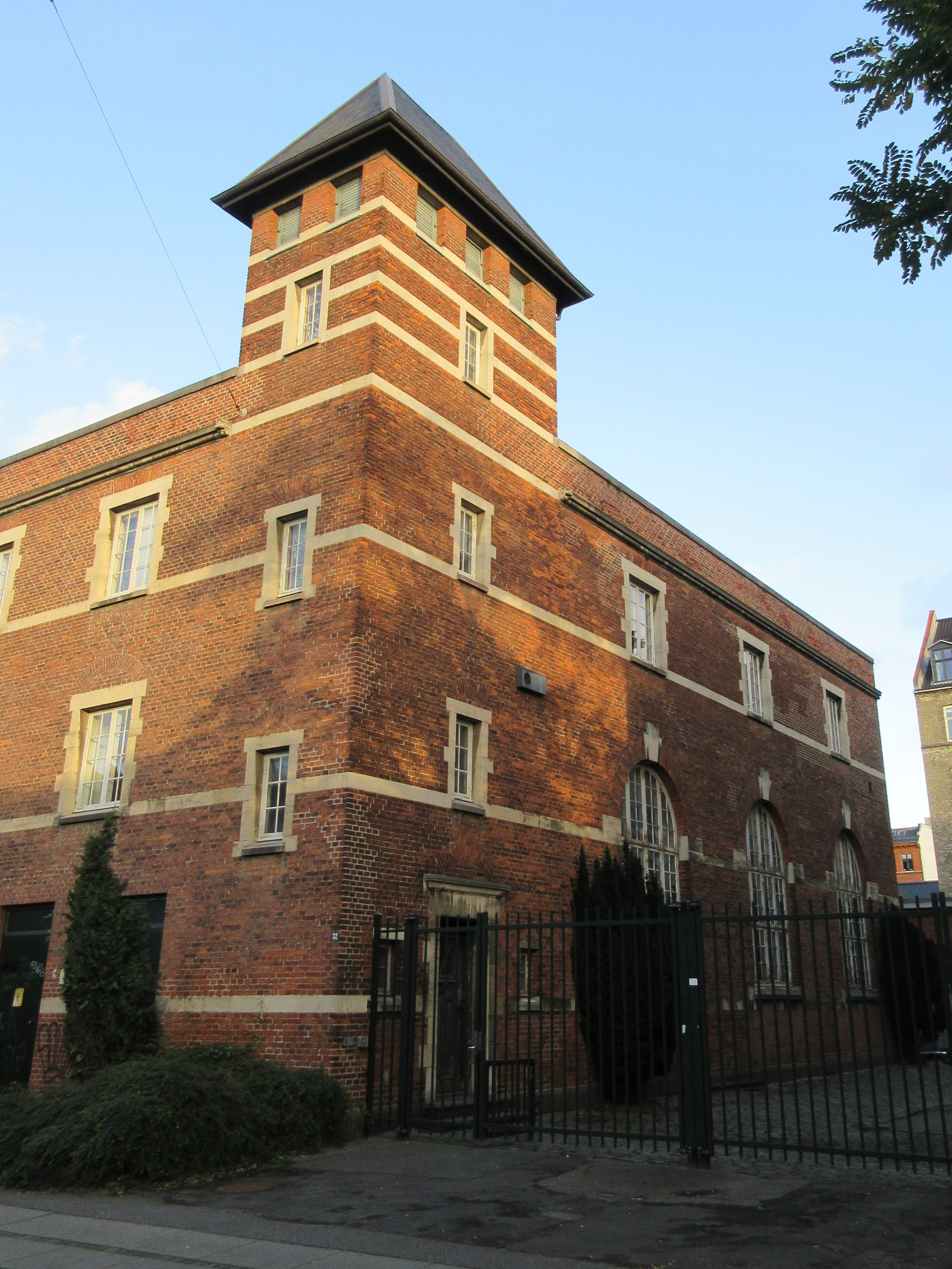
Sankt Knuds Værket

Some of the old villas from the 1860s have survived. No. 4 is from 1868.

Sankt Knuds Værket (No. 32-34) is a former power station built by Frederiksberg Tramway and Electricity Company (Frederiksberg Sporvejs- og Elektricitets Aktieselskab) in 1907. The company's first tram line passed through Niels Ebbesens Vej. The installation was taken over by Frederiksberg Municipality in 1911 and operated by first Frederiksberg Elektricitetsværker and later Frederiksberg kommunale Værker. It was decommissioned in 1927.

== Image gallery ==
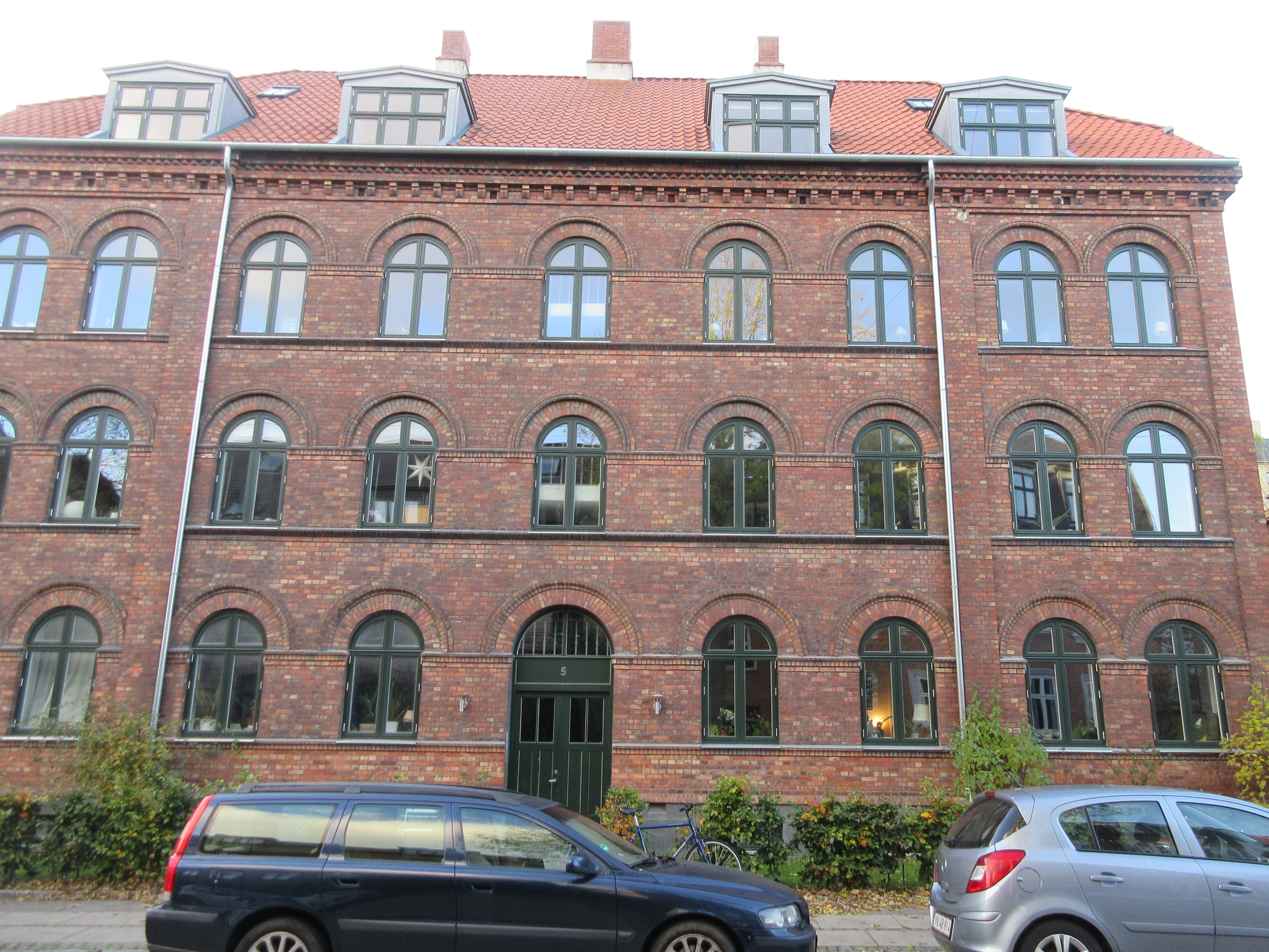
Sankt Knuds Vej 5

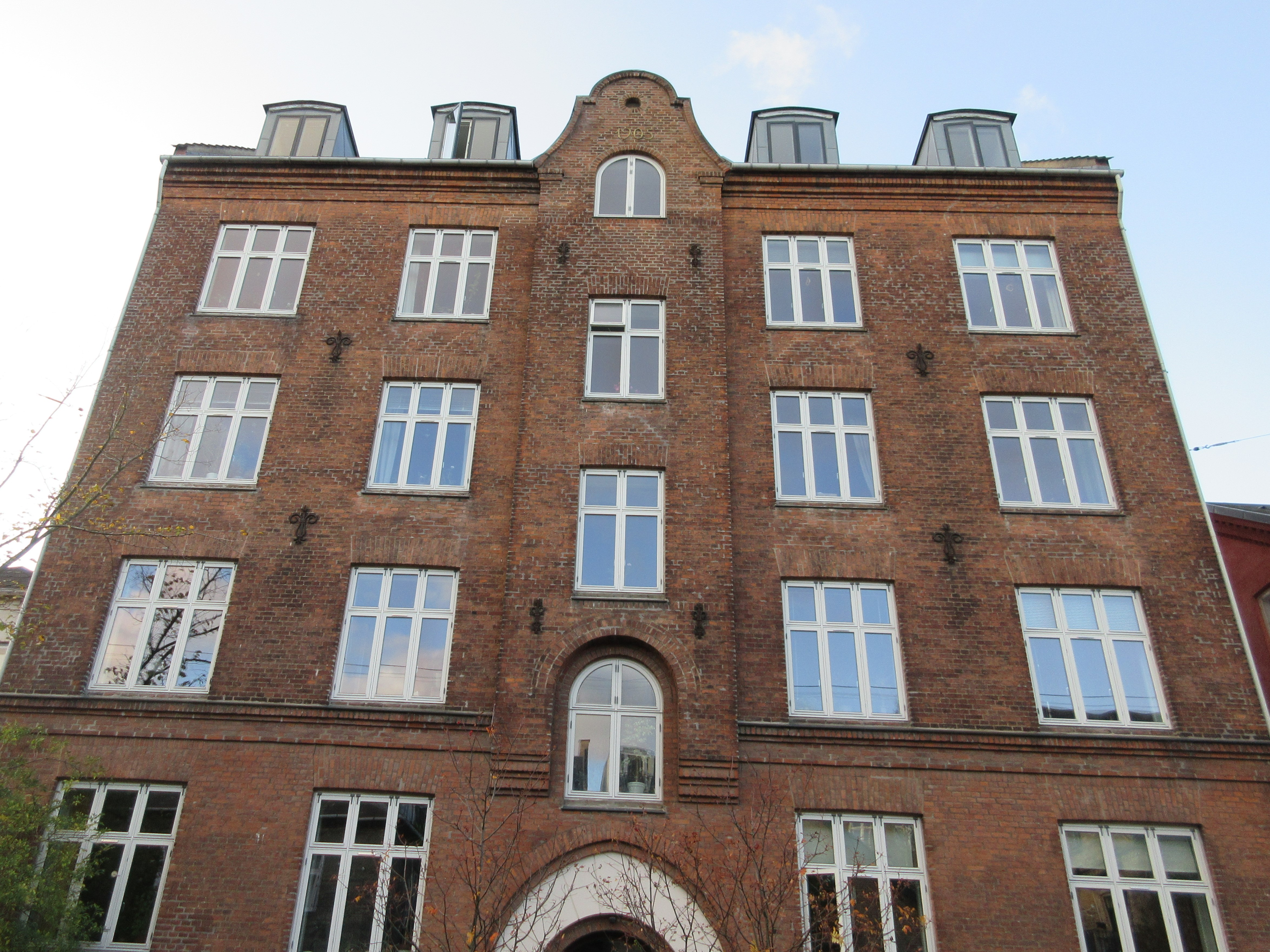
Sankt Knuds Vej 11

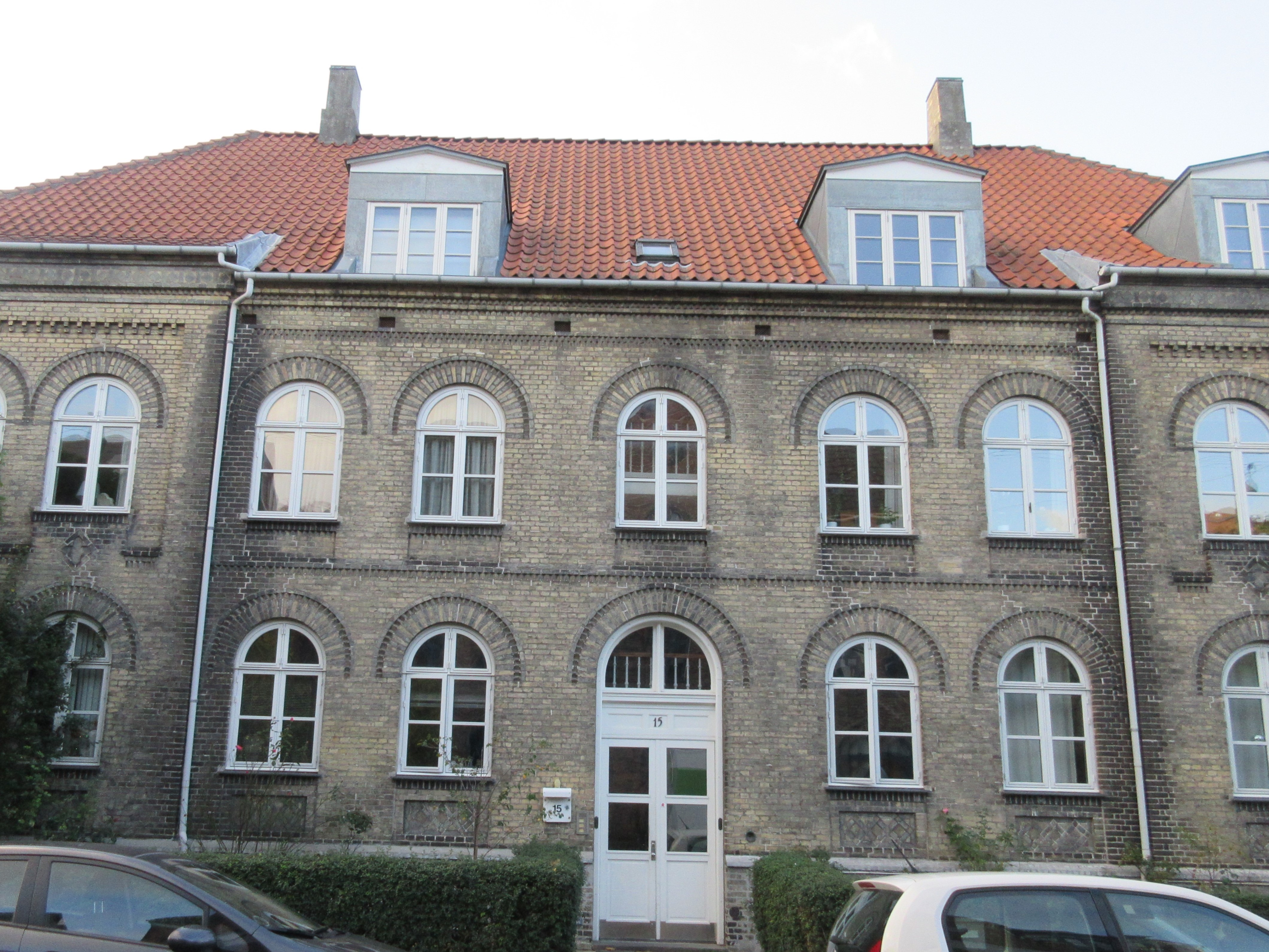
Sankt Knuds Vej 15
