= Schønbergsgade =

Street in Copenhagen, Denmark

Schønbergsgade is a street in the Frederiksberg district of Copenhagen, Denmark. It runs from Gammel Kongevej in the south to Vodroffs Tværgade in the north. No. 15, a four-storey apartment building from 1857 designed by Harald Conrad Stilling, is listed on the Danish registry of protected buildings and places.

== History ==
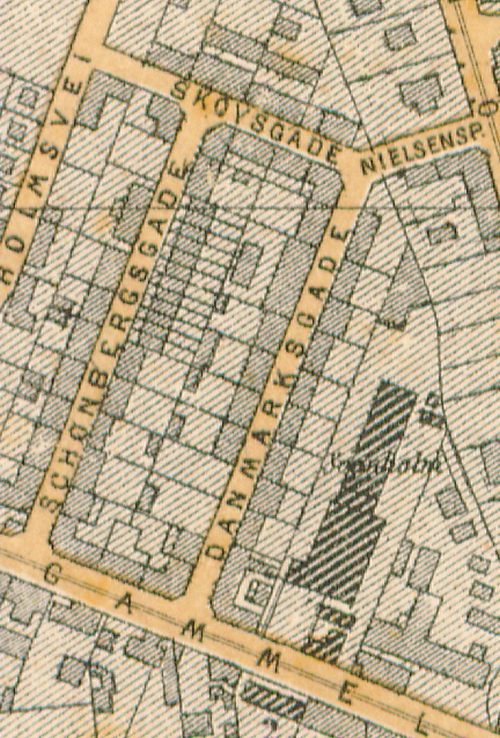
Schønbergsgade seen on a map detail from 1890

In circa 1803, court inspector Hans Henrik Schønberg (1785–1845) bought a large piece of land at the site. In 1845, Schønberg's heirs sold it to a consortium consisting of the architect Harald Conrad Stilling and three partners. In 1852, the so-called Demarcation Line was moved from Falkoner Allé to the Lakes, paving the way for redevelopment of the area. The streets Schønbergsgade, Scnouwsgade (from 1882: Vodroffs Tværgade) and Danmarksgade was subsequently established. Schønberg married Dorthea Cathrine Kirkerup (1779–1857), the widow of naval officer Christian Falbe, in 1807.

The area around Schønbergsgade and Peter Andersen's iron foundry at Svanholm developed into a small working-class neighbourhood in the years after 1857.

A small kiosk building at the corner with Gammel Kongevej disappeared when the street was widened in the 1930s and all the buildings on its east side were demolished when the neighbouring street Danmarksgade disappeared in 1970.

== Notable buildings ==
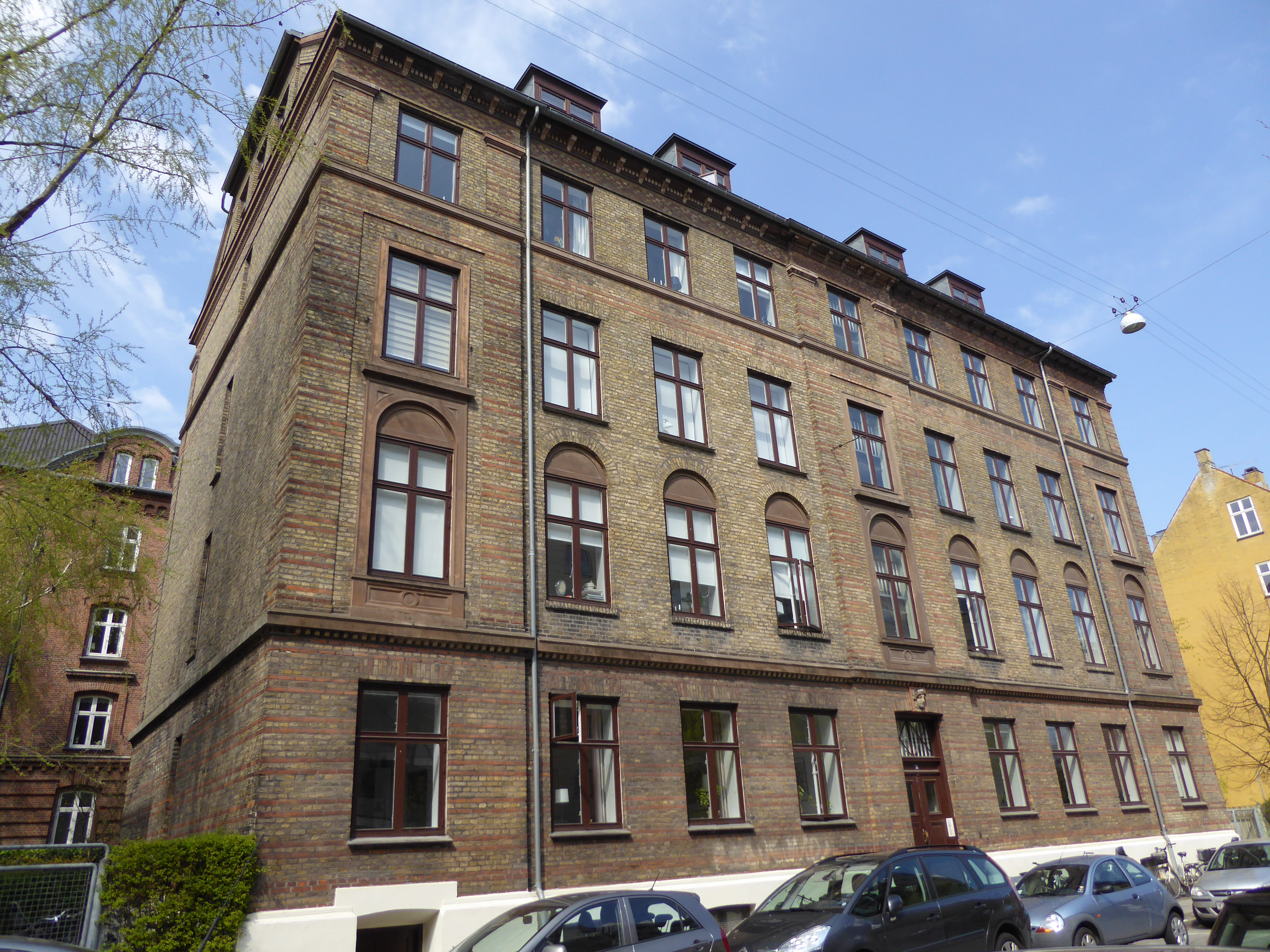
Schønbergsgade 15

The four-storey apartment building at No. 15 is from 1857 and was designed by Harald Conrad Stilling. The building was listed on the Danish registry of protected buildings and places in 1977.

The building at No. 7.9 is from 1857 and was either designed by Vilhelm Klein (1835–1913) or Henrik Sibbern (1826–1901).

Gammel Kongevejsgården (Gammel Kongevej 74D-76 og Schønbergsgade 2–4), a Functionalist housing estate, was built in 1938-39 og to designs by Frits Schlegel and Magnus L. Stephensen.

== See also ==
- Prinsesse Maries Allé
