= Levin House =

Levin House is the name of several buildings:

- Levin House (Copenhagen)
- Levin House (Tel Aviv)
- Robert and Rae Levin House, in Kalamazoo, Michigan, designed by Frank Lloyd Wright
