= Karberghus =

Danish real estate company

- Company type: Private
- Industry: Property
- Founded: 1917
- Headquarters: Copenhagen, Denmark
- Area served: Denmark
- Key people: Andreas Just Karberg (CEO)
- Website: www.karberghus.dk

Karberghus is a Danish real estate company based in Copenhagen, Denmark. It specializes in the acquisition, restoration and renting out of historic properties in the Copenhagen area and is a member of Europa Nostra. Karberghus is the owner of the company Office Club offering coworking in historic buildings in Copenhagen.

== History ==
The company traces its history back to 1917 when Hans Just constructed a combined headquarters and warehouse on Århusgade in the Østerbro district of Copenhagen. The portfolio was later expanded with several storage buildings in suburban Copenhagen. Since 2005 the company has invested in historic properties.

== Portfolio ==
Property	Image	Location	Built	Architect	Ref
Brønnum House		Kongens Nytorv	1866	Ferdinand Vilhelm Jensen (1837–1890)	Ref
Harsdorff House		Kongens Nytorv	1780	Caspar Frederik Harsdorff (1735–1799)	Ref
Ziegler House		Nybrogade	1732	Philip de Lange (1704–1776)	Ref
Dehn Mansion		Frederiksgade	1756	Nicolai Eigtved (1701–1754) / Johann Gottfried Rosenberg (1709–1776)	Ref
Hans Just Warehouse		Århusgade	1917	Rolf Schroeder (1872–1948)	Ref
Reformed Church's Rectory		Åbenrå	1730-32	Philip de Lange (1704–1776)	Ref
Højbro Plads 15		Højbro Plads	1797		Ref
Knuth Mansion		Frederiksgade	1899		Ref
Kalvebod Bastion		Langebrogade	1801		Ref
Kalvebod Bastion: The Forge		Langebrogade	1757		Ref
Nikolaj Plads 23		Nikolaj Plads	1800		Ref
Levin House		Havnegade	1866	J. D. Herholdt (1818–1902)	Ref
Præstøgade 20		Præstøgade	2010	Ole Hagen Arkitekter	Ref
Royal Frederick's Hospital's North Pavilion on Bredgade		Bredgade	1757	Nicolai Eigtved (1701–1754) / Laurids de Thurah (1706–1759)	Ref
Bredgade 56		Bredgade	1856	Johan Jacob Deuntzer (1808–1875)	Ref
Holsteinsgade 63		Holsteinsgade	1987		Ref
Sankt Annæ Plads 6		Sankt Annæ Plads	1763		Ref
Bellavista housing estate		Klampenborg	1934	Arne Jacobsen	Ref
Dronningens Tværgade 26		Dronningens Tværgade	1797		Ref
Vallensbækvej 25		Vallensbæk	1985/2017		Ref
Vallensbækvej 27		Vallensbæk	1981		Ref
Abildager 27			1976		Ref
