= Højbro Plads 15 =

Building in Copenhagen

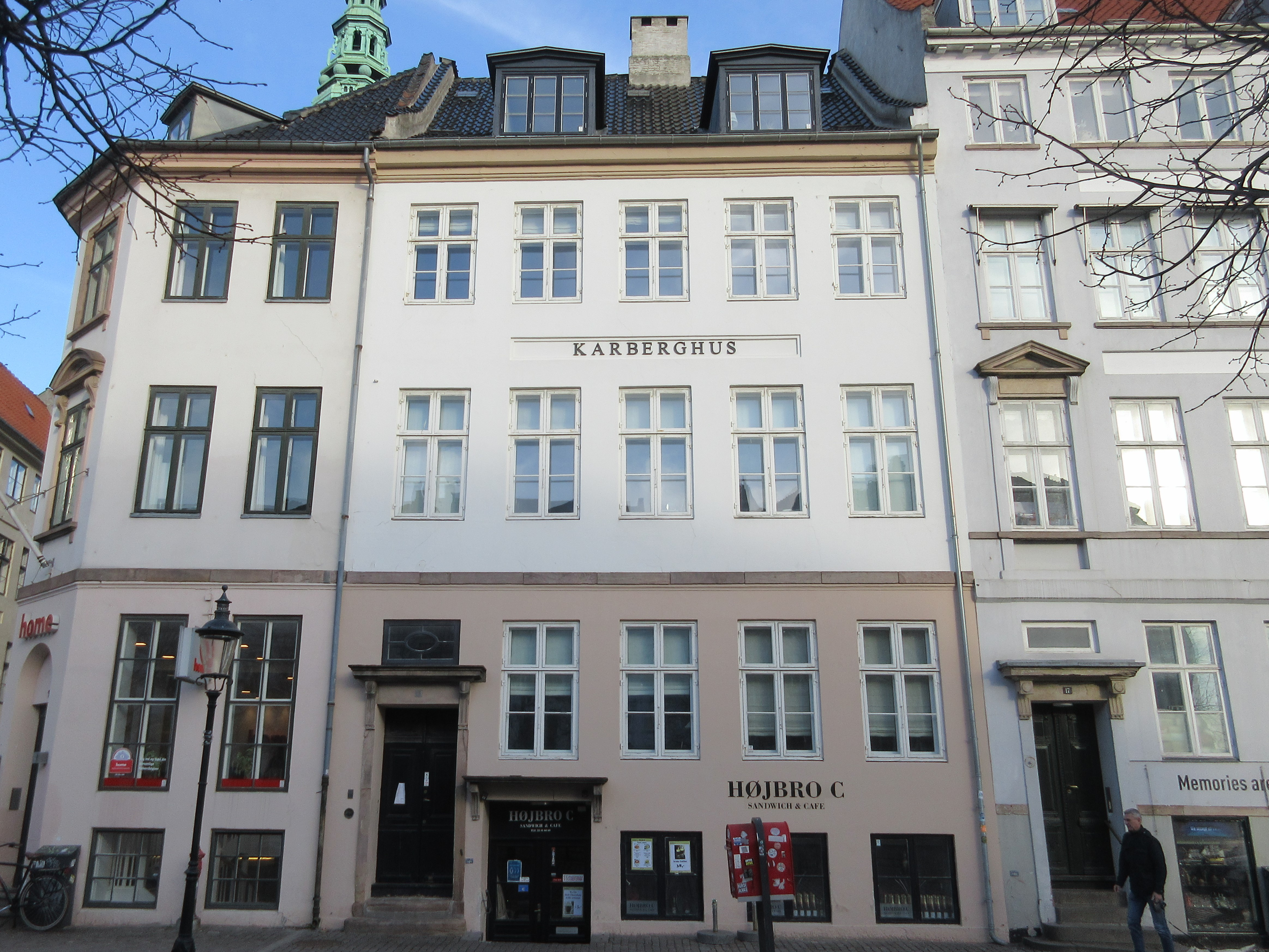
- Interactive map of the Højbro Plads 15 area

General information
- Architectural style: Neoclassical
- Location: Copenhagen, Denmark
- Coordinates: 55°40′41.74″N 12°34′49.12″E
- Completed: 1797

Højbro Plads 15 is a Neoclassical property situated on Højbro Plads in central Copenhagen, Denmark. The building was like most of the other buildings in the area constructed as part of the rebuilding of the city following the Copenhagen Fire of 1795. It was listed in the Danish registry of protected buildings and places in 1950.

== History ==
=== 18th century ===
The site was together with that of present-day No. 17 in 1689 part of a larger property (then No. 217) owned by wine vendor (vintapper) Peter Pecken. It was then situated in the no longer existing street Store Færgestræde. In 1756, it was as No. 255 owned by merchant Albrecht Edelberg.

=== Poul Christensen and the new building ===
The building were destroyed in the Copenhagen Fire of 1795. The square was subsequently created as part of Peter Meyn's and Jørgen Henrich Rawert's plan for the rebuilding of the city. The current building was constructed in 1797 for restaurateur (spisevært) Johan Mortensen Eisen. The adjacent corner building at No. 256 (now Højbro Plads 13) had already been completed for him in 1796.

Poul Christensen's building was home to 14 residents in three households at the time of the 1801 census. Poul Chrestensen (who was at sea when the census took place) resided in the building with his wife Mette Maria Madsen, their two sons (aged 11 and 14), the wife's nephew nine-year-old nephew Caroline Madsen and one maid. Friderich Liunge, a wine merchant, resided in another apartment with his wife Maria Kirstine Winther, their two children (aged two and three), an apprentice and a maid. John Dicheie. a 44-year-old man (no profession mentioned in the census records), resided in the last apartment with his nephew William Dicheie.

The property was listed in the new cadastre of 1806 as No. 44. It was stilled owned by Poul Christensen, who had now become a ship captain.

=== 1840 census ===
Andreas Henr. Schaltz opened a bookshop in the building in 1827.

The property was home to 17 residents in five households at the 1840 census. Andreas Henrik Schaltz (1790-1848), a bookseller and krigsassessor, resided in the building with his wife Sidse Cathrine Clausen, their two children (aged 10 and 13) and one maid. Christiane Gerson Levy (née d'Origny), widow of Herson Levy (died 1931) and sister of major-general Origny, resided on the first floor with one maid. Magrethe Høyriis (née Thesen), another widow, resided on the second floor with the widow Elisa Madsen (née Høyriis), Madsen's six-year-old daughter Louise Madsen and one maid. Søren Christian Jensen, a beer seller (øltapper), resided in the basement with his wife Catrine Jensen, their two children (aged 10 and 12) and one maid. Peter Christian Nielsen, an Examinatus juris, resided in the garret.

=== 1845 census) ===
The property was home to 23 residents in three households at the 1845 census. Peter Christian Jersild, a financier, resided on the ground floor and second floor with his wife Christine Marie Høyen, their four children (aged four to 10), his father Christen Laursen Jersild, one male servant and two maids. Rasmus Nicolai Hall, a master shoemaker, resided on the first floor with his wife Johanne Marie Jørgensen, their six children /aged two to 11) and one maid. Søren Christian Jensen, a beer seller (øltapper), resided in the basement with his wife Cathrine Johansen and their two children (aged 15 and 16).

=== 1850 census ===
The property was home to 22 residents in three households at the 1850 census. Peter Christian Jersild resided with his family on the two lower floors at the 1850. He lived there with his wife, their five children (aged four to 15), 76.year-old Christen Laursen Jersild, two male servants and two maids. Amalia Jensen, a just 29-year-old widow, resided on the second floor with her 12-year-old son, a visitor and a lodger. The lodger was the composer Emil Horneman (listed as a musikhandlende, "music retailer"), Søren Christian Jensen was still residing in the basement with his wife and three children.

=== Later history ===
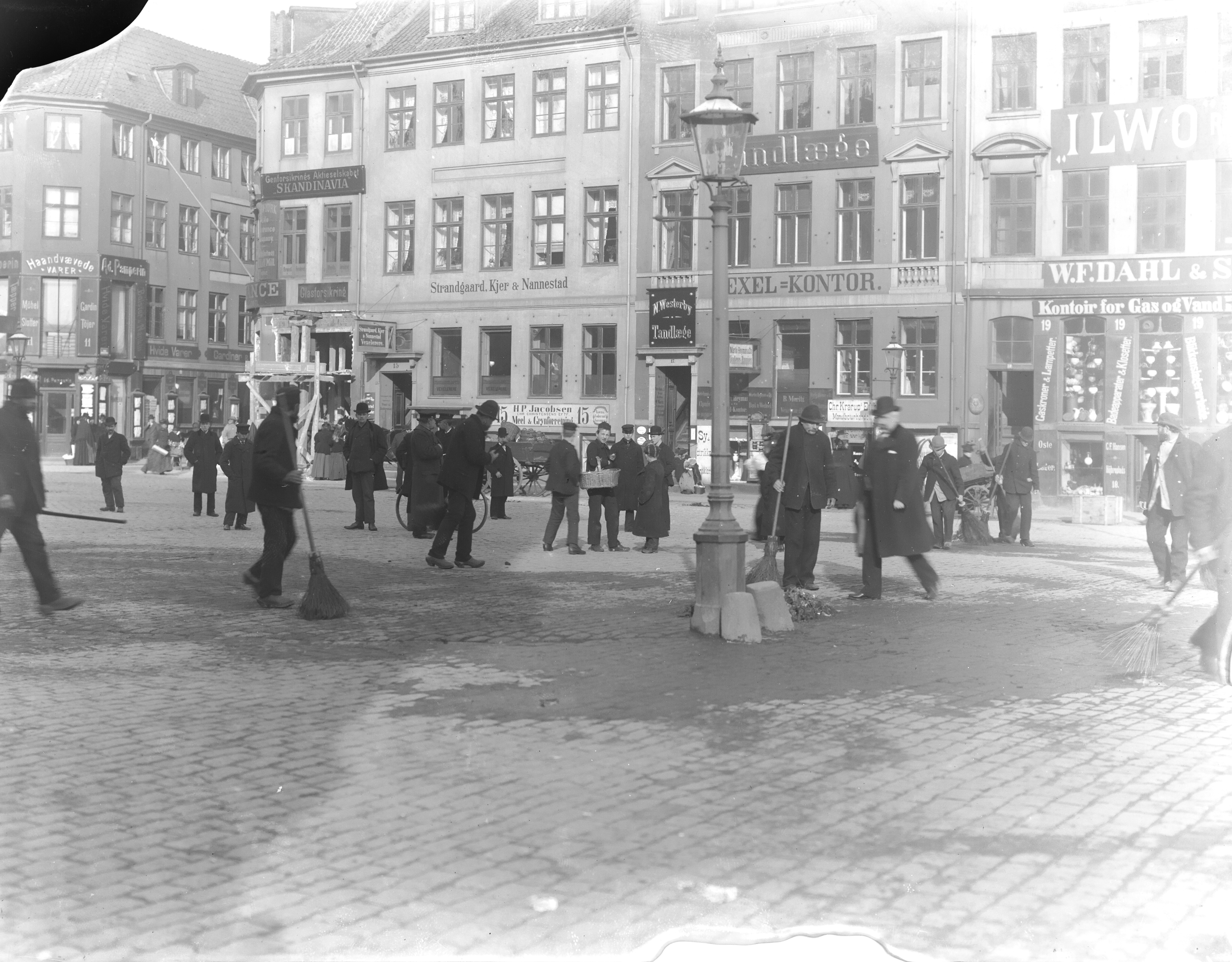
The building ona photograph by Frederik Riise, 1899.

The composer Emil Horneman (1809-1870) was a resident in the building in 1850-51. With the introduction of house numbering by street in Copenhagen in 1859 (as opposed to the old cadastral lot numbering by quarter), No. 44 became Højbro Plads 15.

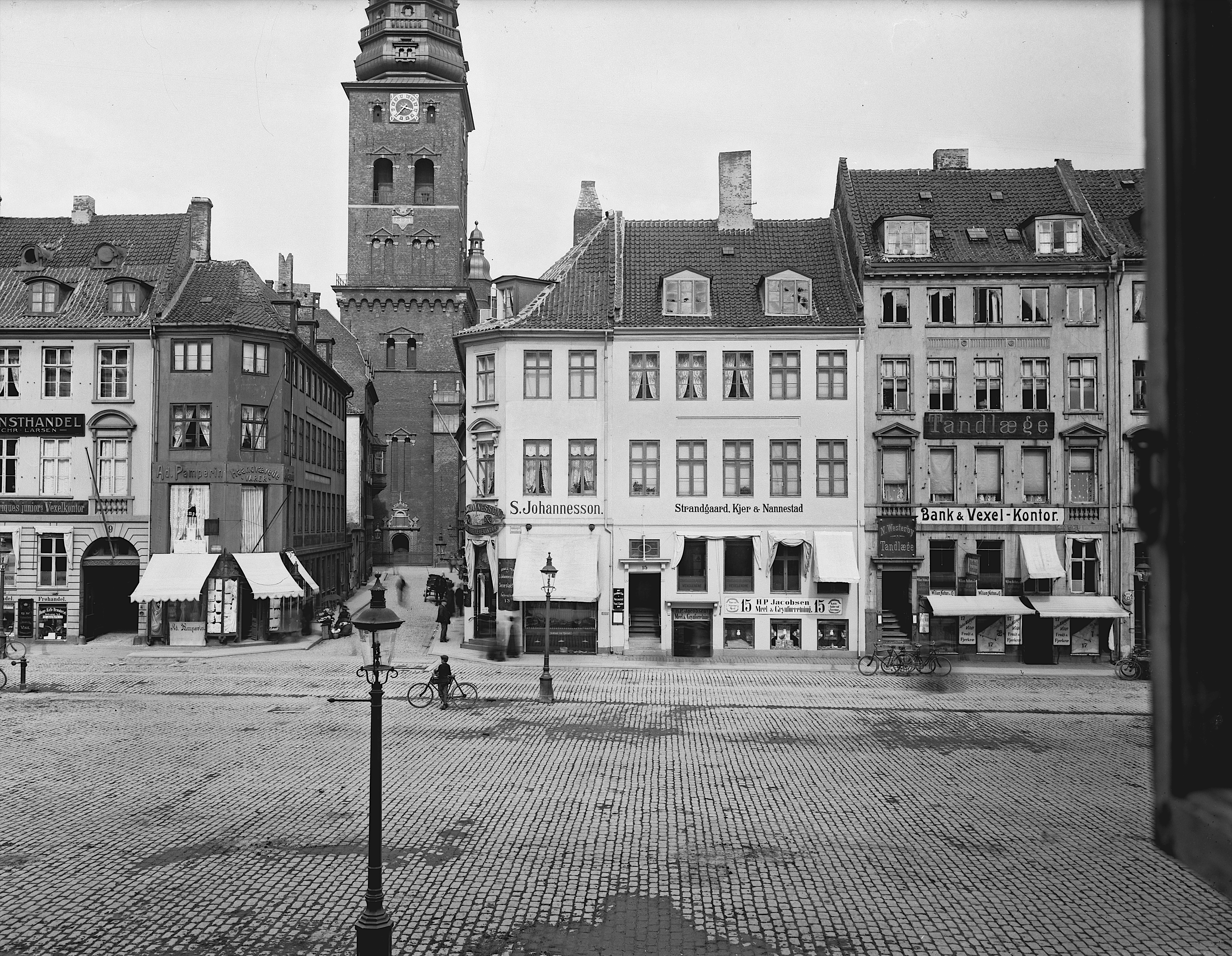
The building (second from the right)on 13 June 1911

The property was at the time of the 1880 census home to a total of 12 people. Peter Valdemar Jersild, a broker, resided on the two flower floors with his wife, two sons, his widowed mother-in-law and a maid. One of the sons, Oluf Jersild (1867-1950), then aged 13, would grow up to become a prominent physician. Christine Marie Jersild, Peter Valdemar Jersild's widowed sister-in-law, was also residing in the building with three unmarried children and a maid.One of the three children was the painter Julius Jersild.

Strandgaard, Kjær & Nannestad, a brokerage firm, was from at least 1911 until the mid 1950s based in the building. H. P. Jacobsen's flour and groats shop was in 1911 based in the basement.

== Architecture ==
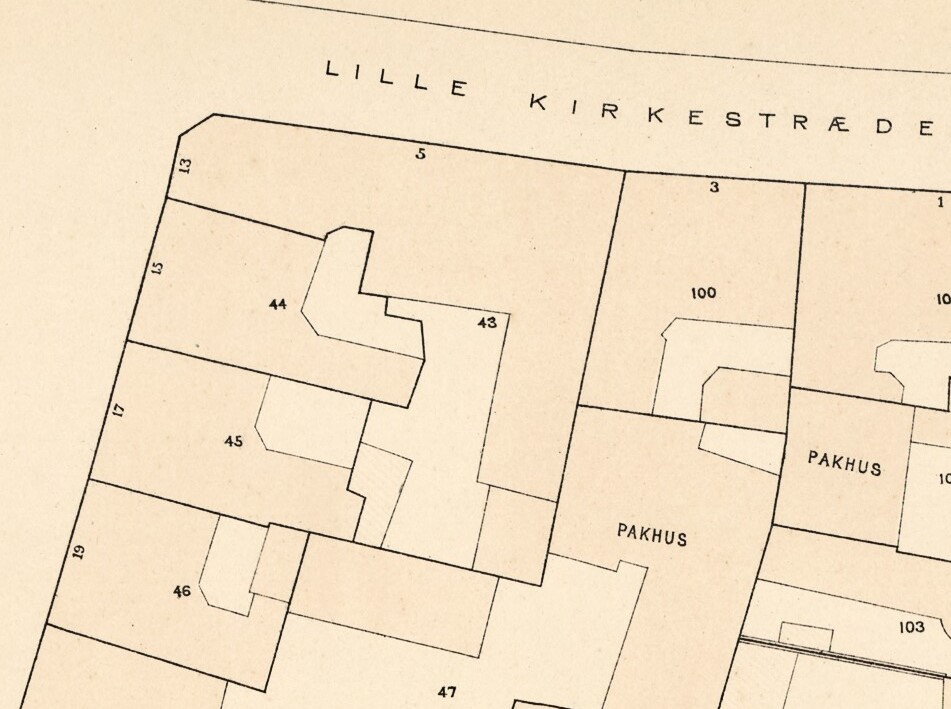
The property seen in a detail from one of Berggreen's block plans of Eastern Quarter, 1886-88.

The building consists of three storeys over a raised cellar and is five bays wide. The facade is divided horizontally by a smooth band of Necø sandstone above the ground floor. The main entrance furthest to the left is topped by a Neoclassical hood mould made of Nexø sandstone. The stairs that lead up to the main entrance is also made of Nexø sandstone. Next to the main entrance is a cellar entrance. It is also topped by a hood mould supported by corbels. A depressed band between the central windows of the two uppers floors was originally site of a stucco frieze but now features the name of the owner (Jarberghus). The original modillioned cornice was replaced by the current one in 1886.

== Today ==
The property is today owned by the property company Karberghus.
