= Levin House (Copenhagen) =

Building in Copenhagen, Denmark

- Levins Gård
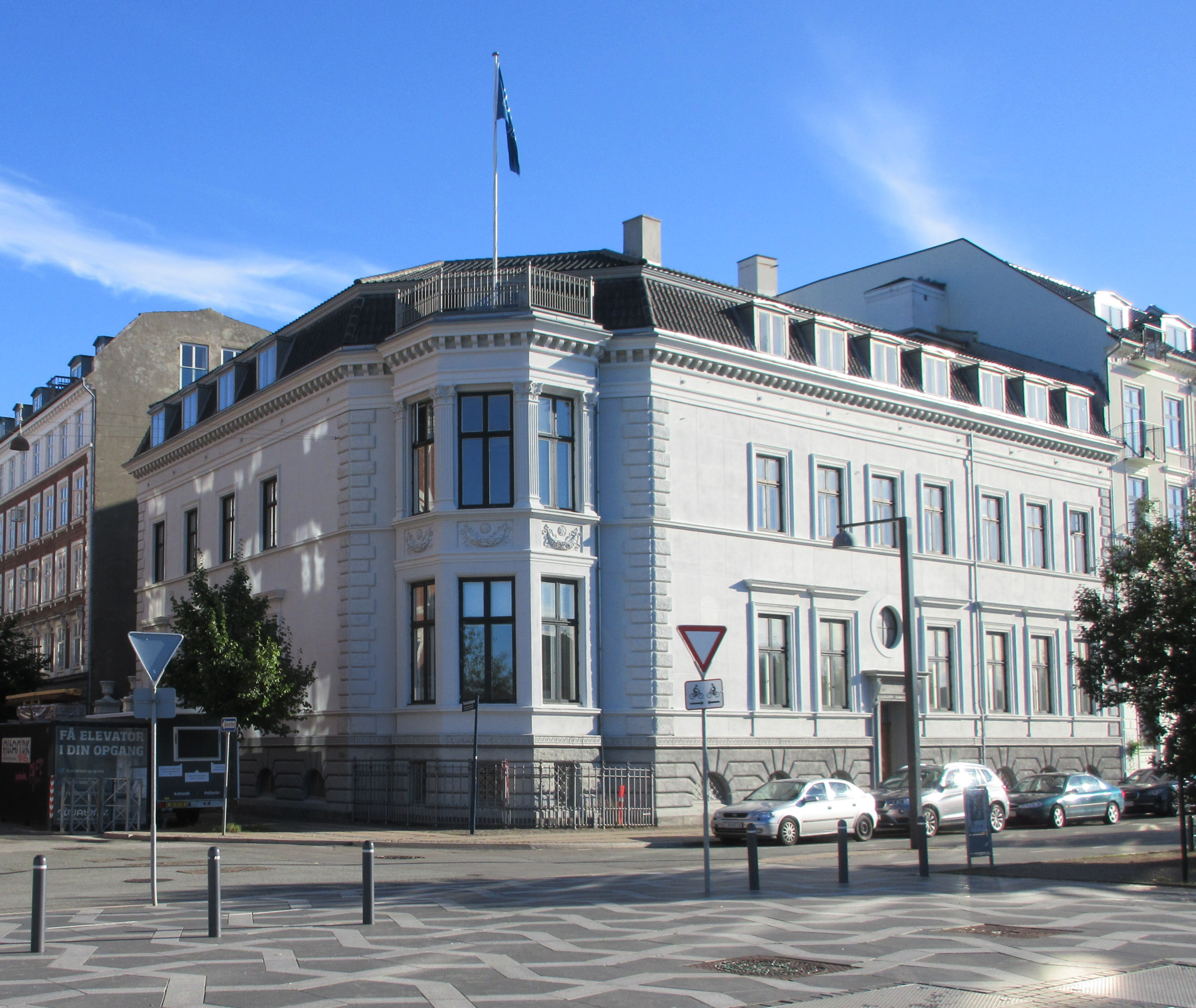
- The Levin House
- Interactive map of the Levin House area

General information
- Architectural style: Historicism
- Location: Copenhagen, Denmark
- Coordinates: 55°40′36.2″N 12°35′19.8″E
- Construction started: 1665
- Completed: 1666
- Owner: Karberghus

Technical details
- Floor count: high cellar, ground floor, one upper floor, mansard roof

Design and construction
- Architect: Johan Daniel Herholdt

The Levin House (Danish: Levins Gård or Levins Hus) is a Historicist property located on Gammelholm's Havnegade waterfront in central Copenhagen, Denmark. Designed by Johan Daniel Herholdt and completed in 1866, it is one of the first buildings that was completed after the former Naval dockyard came under redevelopment in the 1860s. The building is today owned by the Karberghus company and occupied by a law firm. It was listed in 1978.

== History ==
=== 19th century ===
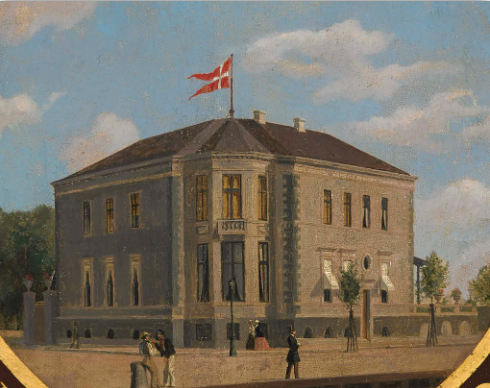
The house seen in a detail from Martin Levin's ceremonial target in the Royal Danish Shooting Society

In 1859 the Navy decommissioned their last operations at Gammelholm, and the area was designated for residential redevelopment. The city's initial plan was to reserve it for large villas in an attempt to keep wealthy tax-payers within the municipal borders since they were increasingly settling in Frederiksberg or in the northern suburbs. The grocer and bankier Martin Levin bought a lot on the waterfront and charged the architect Johan Daniel Herholdt with designing a house which was built in 1865–66. Due to the difficult economic times that followed from Denmark's involvement in the Second Schleswig War, it was the only detached single-family house-with-garden that was built in the area. Gammelholm was instead built over with apartment buildings according to a master plan created by Ferdinand Meldahl. An expansion of the house incorporated it into the block structure of the new plan.

=== 20th century ===
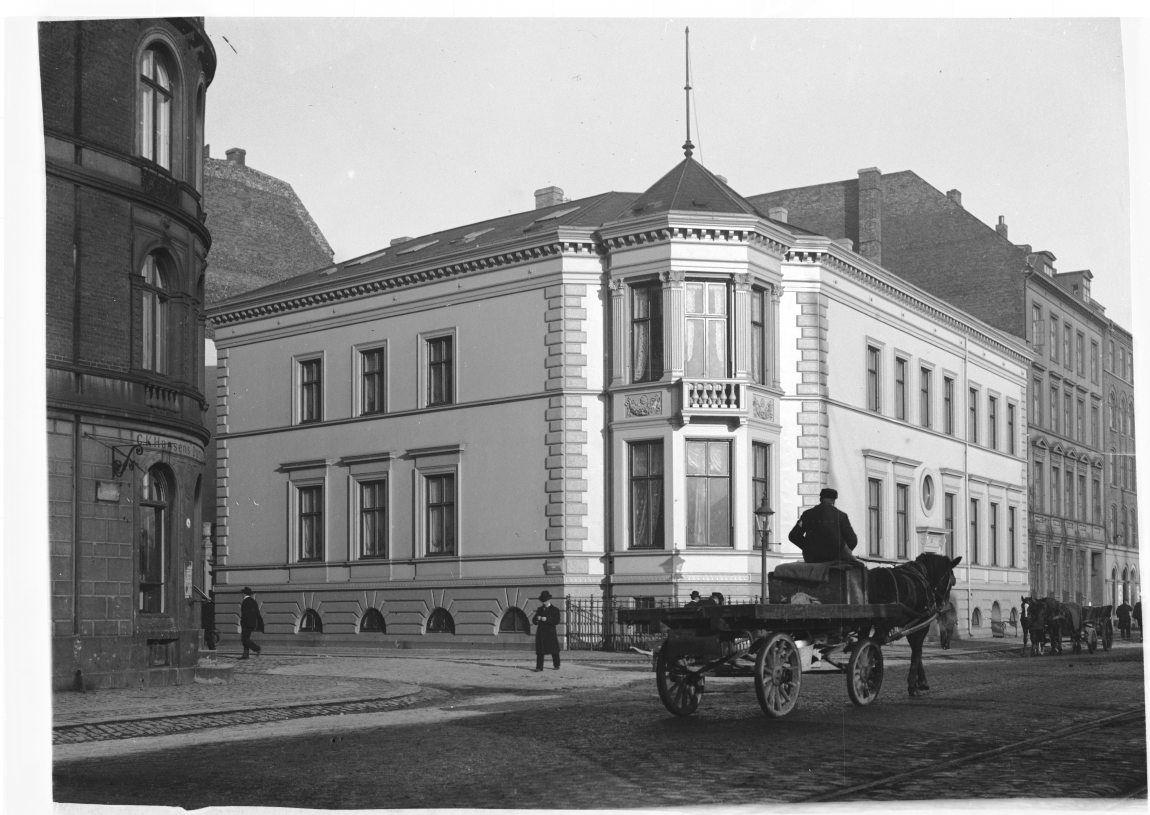
The Levin House photographed by Fritz Theodor Benzen (1900s)

The Levin House was purchased by the grocer and numismatist Lars Emil Bruun in 1900. In 1922, it was acquired by Danish Distillers. The company was headquartered in the building until 1968. It was then owned by the Workers' Cooperative Housing Association (Arbejdernes Andels Boligforening, AAB) until 2011 when it was acquired by the private property investment company Karberghus.

The property was later sold to Boligforeningen AAB. In 2011, AAB sold it to Karberghus.

== Architecture ==
The Levin House is designed in the Historicist style with influence from Italian Renaissance and consists of two stories with a mansard roof over a high cellar. The original villa consisted of four bays facing Havnegade and two bays facing Tordenskjoldsgade. The extension which integrated it into the block structure added three bays facing the water and two bays on Tordenskjoldsgade, where a gate separates the property from the neighboring, five-story apartment building. The diagonally cut-off corner features a canted bay window topped by a balcony and with Corinthian pilasters flanking the windows on the second floor. There is rustication on the high cellar and at the corners. The interior of the building originally featured decorative paintings on walls and ceilings by Georg Hilker, but they have been lost.

== Today ==
The building is owned by the Karberghus property company. The tenant is the law firm Husen Advokater.

== See also ==
- Harald Valdemar Mansfeld-Büllner (1842–1900), Danish businessman and numismatist
