= Sankt Annæ Plads 6 =

Building in Copenhagen, Denmark

Sankt Annæ Plads 7
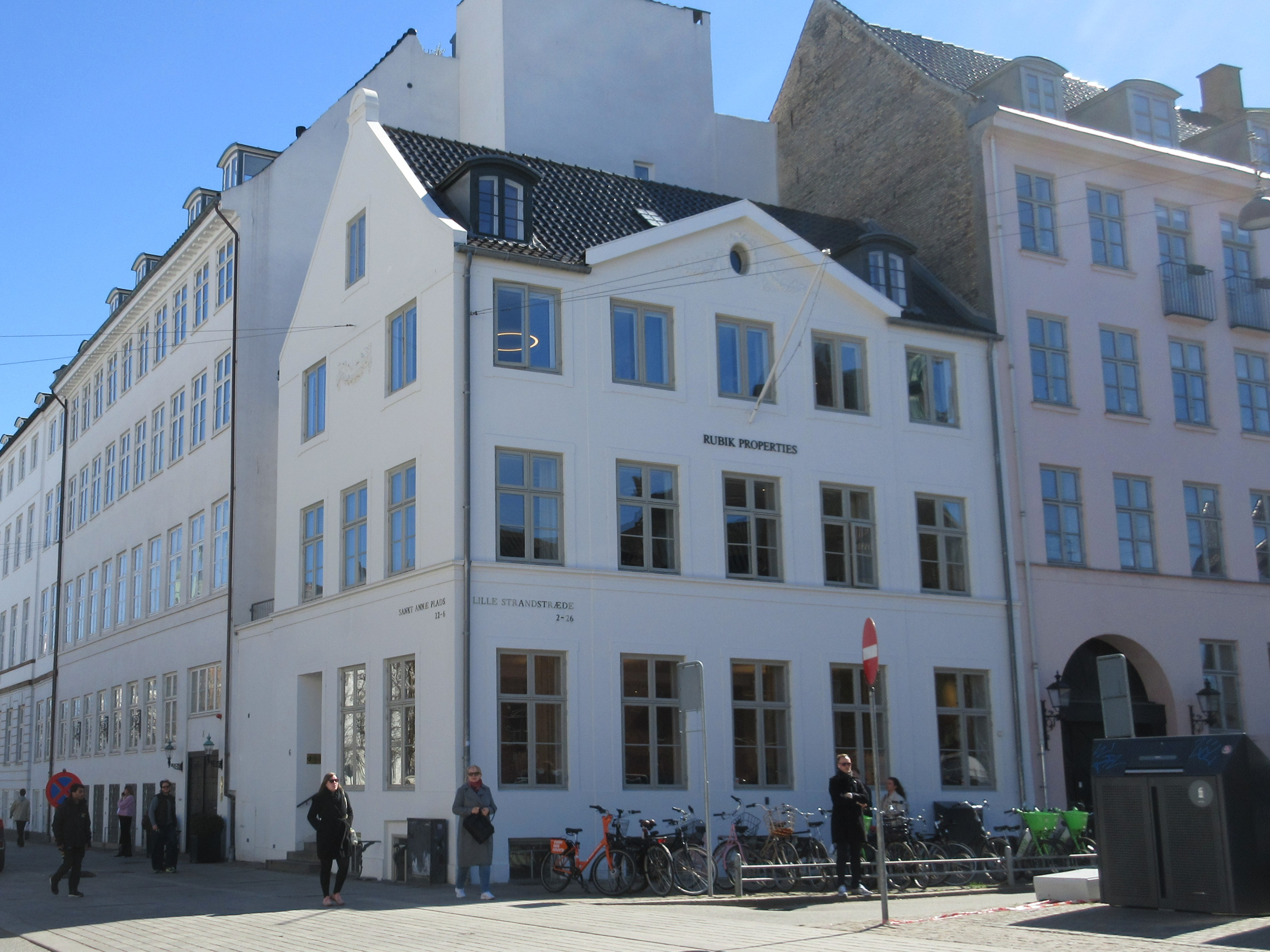
- Interactive map of the Sankt Annæ Plads 7 area

General information
- Location: Copenhagen, Denmark 52.39
- Coordinates: 55°40′53.65″N 12°35′25.98″E
- Completed: 18th century

Sankt Annæ Plads 6/Lille Strandstræde 24 is an 18th-century property situated at the corner of Sankt Annæ Plads and Lille Strandstræde, across the street from the Garrison Church, in central Copenhagen, Denmark. With its low height and a principal facade that does not face Sankt Annæ Plads, it stands out from the other buildings on the square, bearing testament to a time when the city was lower and Frederiksstaden had only just started to develop. It was listed in the Danish registry of protected buildings and places in 1950 and is now owned by Karberghus.

== History ==
Ḛ===17th century===

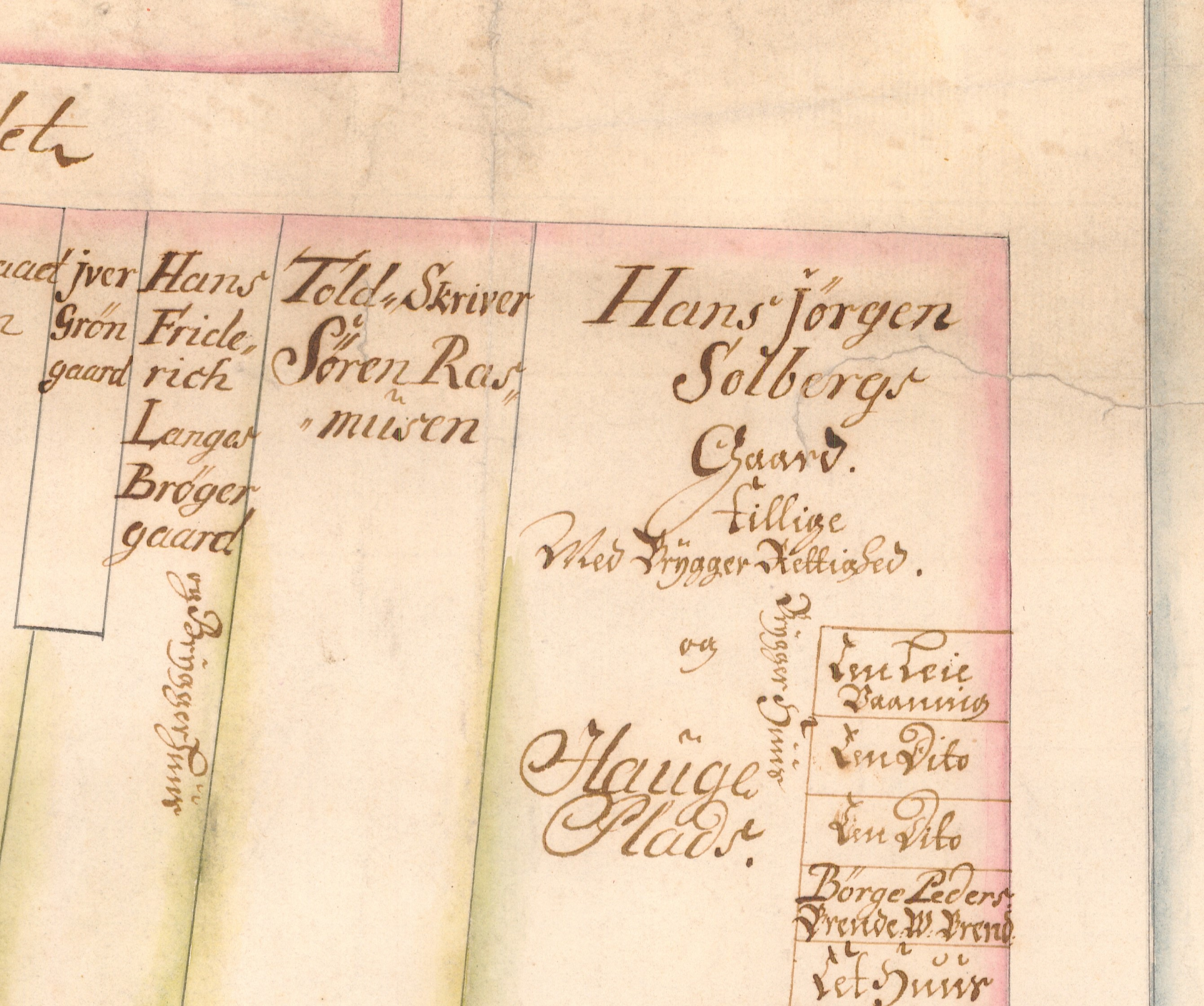
Hans Kørgen Soelberg's property seen in a detail from a plan from 1731

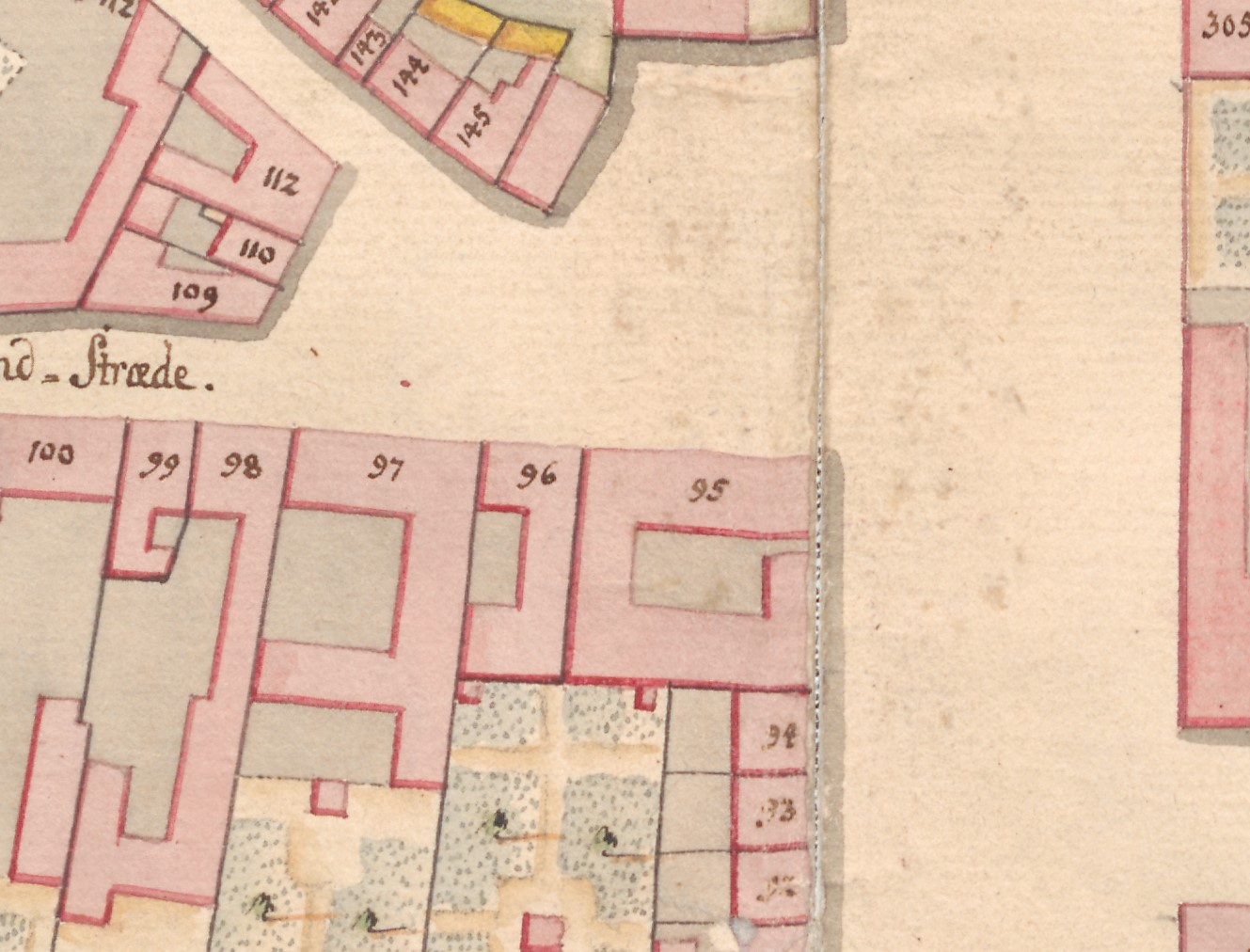
No. 95 seen in a detail from Christian Gedde's map of St. Ann's Rast Quarter, 1757

In the late 17th century, the property was part of a much larger property. In Copenhagen's first cadastre of 1689, it was listed as No. 24. It was at that time owned by Admiral Marcus Rodsten. The property was thereafter divided into a number of smaller properties. The corner property (still larger than present-day Sankt Annæ Plads 6) was acquired by brewer and customs inspector Søren Sørensen. On his death in 1709, it passed to his son-in-law, Hans Jørgen Soelberg (1681–1868), a timber merchant from Drammen, Norway, who had recently moved to Copenhagen. Soelberg was later active as a general trader, ship-owner and bank commissioner. His widow kept the property until 1762. In the new cadastre of 1756, the corner property was listed as No. 95.

The current building on the site was constructed with two storeys before 1753 for tanner Niels Könsberg. The property was heightened by one storey in the early 1780s.

At the time of the 1787 census, No. 95 was owned by Wasserschout Jens Kliim. He lived there with his wife Maria Charl. Linch, their four children (aged eight to 18), his mother-in-law Anna Cat. Linck, a maid and a lodger. Generalinde Reinweich, a 79-year-old widow, resided in the building with her 30-year-old daughter Søster Reinweich and a maid. A captain in the Royal Danish Navy named Bielche was also a resident of the building.

=== Schiøtt and Herløw, 1792–1824 ===
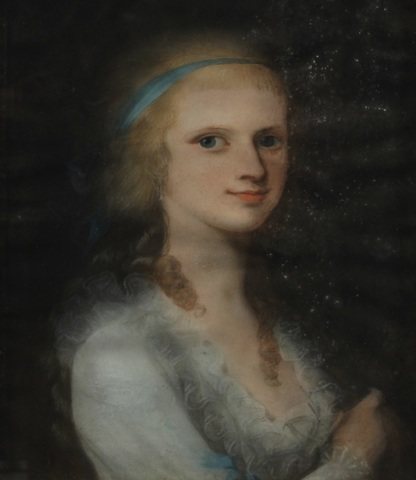
Martine Wilhelmine Herløw, née Westman

The property was later acquired by Niels Nielsen Schiøtt, whose firm, later known as N. Schiøtt & Hochbrandt, was based in the building since its foundation in 1792. In 1796, he partnered with Hans Jørgen Herløw (1763–1837). In 1798, Herløw purchased the building. In the new cadastre of 1806, the property was listed as No. 62.

The partnership was discontinued around 1807. Herløw was married to Martine Wilhelmine Westman. Their daughter Marie Kirstine Herløw (1788–1842) married the naval officer Louis de Coninck (1788–1840), a son of the wealthy merchant Frédéric de Coninck, in 1809. They resided in Herløw's building after selling the De Coninck House to fellow naval officer Johan Friderich Hedemann (1786–1826) in 1815. Herløw kept the building until his death. Martine Wilhelmine Westman sold it in 1924.

=== Trampe family ===
The property was at some point prior to the 1834 census acquired by Friderich Christopher Just Gerhardt Trampe, a naval officer and inspector of the city's Harbour Dredging Authority. He was at that time residing in the building with his wife Conradine Cecelie (née Haag), their three sons (aged 25 to 29), nephew August Sophus Ferdinand Trampe, niece Lovise Eleonore Sophie Margareth Trampe and two maids.

Trampe and his family occupied the entire building at the time of the 1840 and 1845 censuses. Trampe was by 1840 licensed as a merchant (grosserer) and served as inspector of the Copenhagen Spinning Mill (Københavns Spinderi), but was by 1845 back in his old job as inspector of the Harbour Dredging Authority.

=== Later history ===
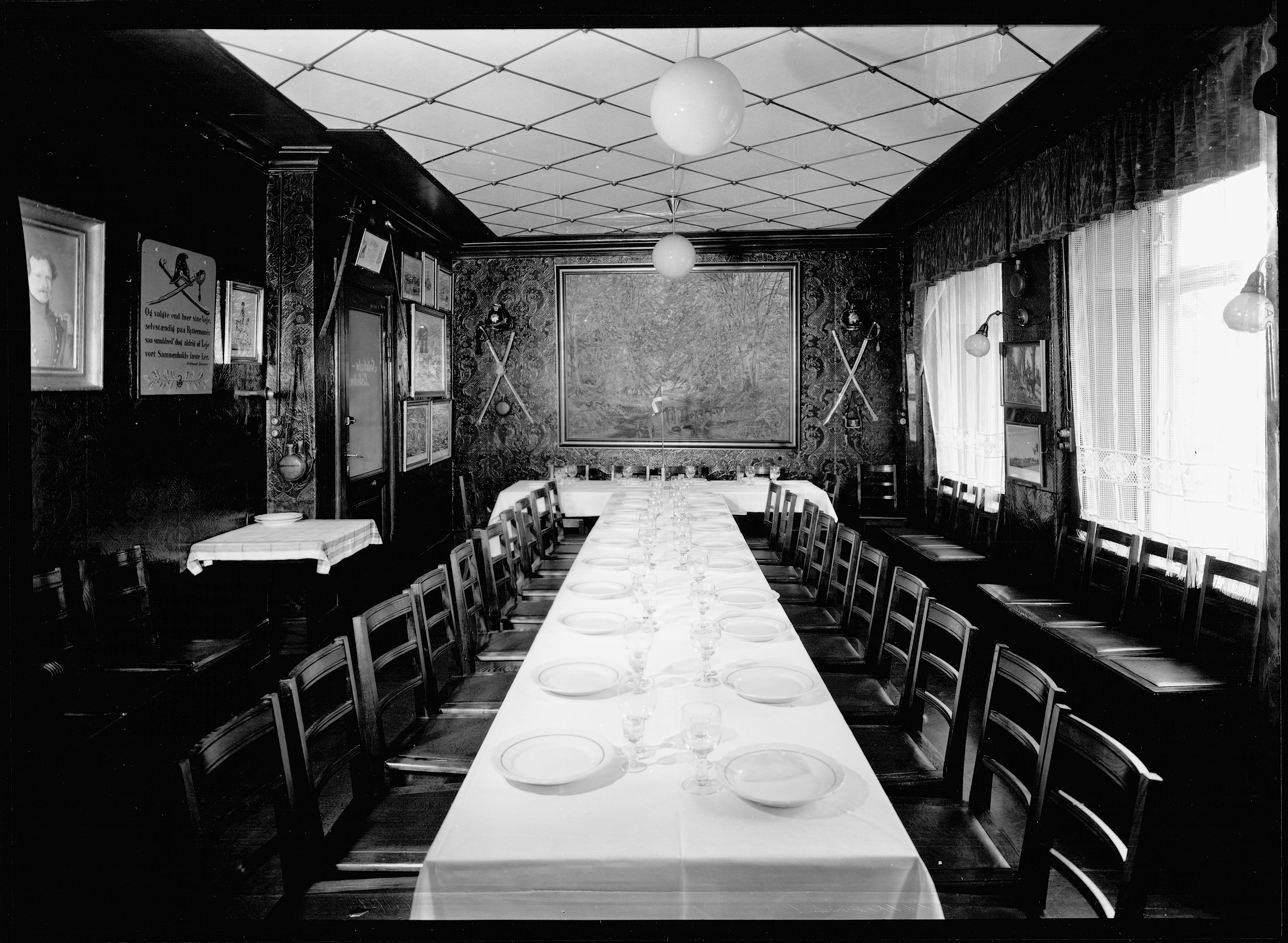
Restaurant Van Zandt in 1936

At the time of the 1850 census, No. 62 was home to three households. Anthon Bertrand Thrane, a wine merchant, resided on the ground floor with his wife Wilhelmine Christophine née Knudsen. Ane Marie Larsdatter, a maid, resided in the basement. Niels Høyrup, a royal lackey, resided on the first floor with his wife Margrethe Høyrup and their three children (aged 17 to 20) and a maid.

In 1859, when house numbering by street replaced the old cadastral numbers by quarter, the corner property was listed with its current house numbers.

Restaurant Van Zandt was based in the building at the beginning of the 20th century. Its ground floor dining rooms were finished with glazed ceilings.

== Architecture ==
Sankt Annæ Plads 6 is a corner building with a five-bay principal facade on Lille Strandstræde and a three-bay gable facing the square. The slightly projecting three central bays of the facade towards Lille Strandstræde are topped by a triangular pediment with an oculus and festoon decorations. Another festoon decoration is seen between the windows on the second floor of the gable. The roof is clad with black tile.

== Today ==
The property is currently owned by Karberghus and used as office space.
