= Højbro Plads 17 =

Building in Copenhagen

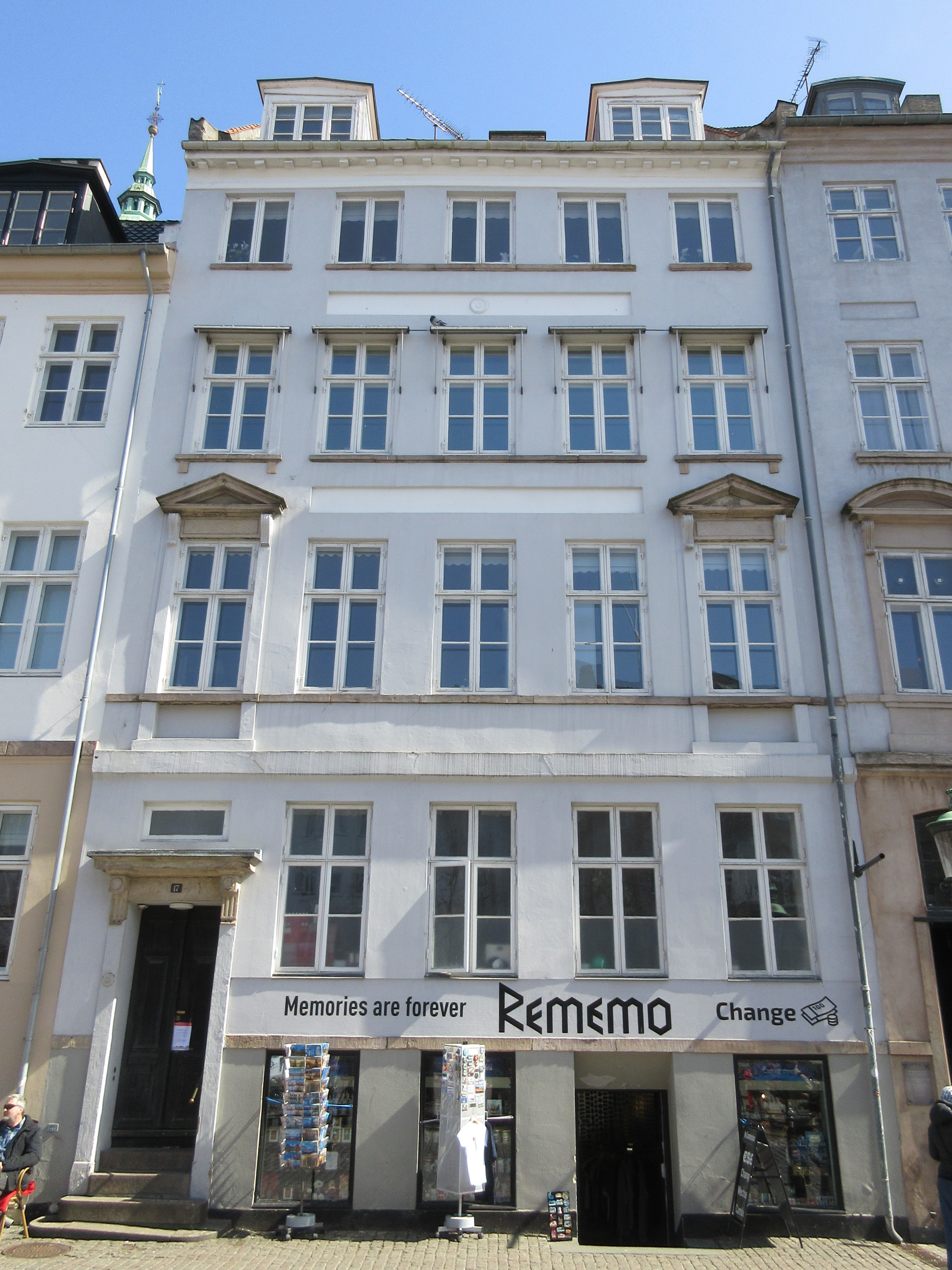
- Interactive map of the Højbro Plads 17 area

General information
- Architectural style: Neoclassical
- Location: Copenhagen, Denmark
- Coordinates: 55°40′41.45″N 12°34′49.19″E
- Completed: 1798

Højbro Plads 17 is a Neoclassical property situated on the east side of Højbro Plads in central Copenhagen, Denmark. The building was like most of the other buildings in the area constructed as part of the rebuilding of the city following the Copenhagen Fire of 1795. It was listed in the Danish registry of protected buildings and places in 1924.

== History ==
=== 18th century ===
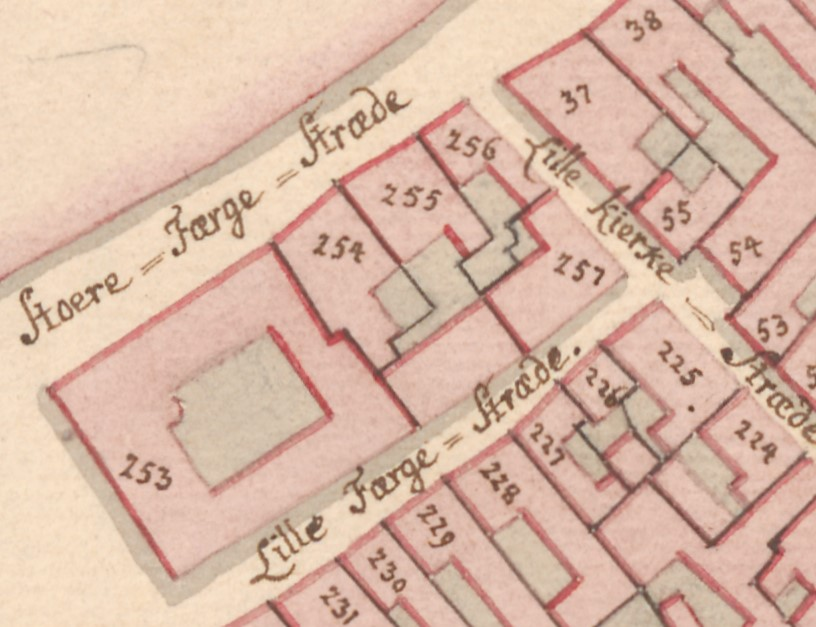
No. 254 seen on a detail from Christian Gedde's map of the East Quarter, 1757.

The property was together with the adjacent corner property Højbro Plads 15 formerly part of a property listed in Copenhagen's first cadastre of 1689 as No. 217 in the city's East Quarter (Øster Kvarter). The site was together with that of present-day No. 15 in 1689 part of a larger property (then No. 217) owned by wine vendor (vintapper) Peter Pecken. It was then situated in the no longer existing street Store Færgestræde. It was owned by wine merchant (vintapper) Peter Pecken. The property was listed in the new cadastre of 1756 as No. 254 and belonged to one naval commander Kiærulff.

=== Both and the new building ===
The property was destroyed in the Copenhagen Fire of 1795. The square was subsequently created as part of Peter Meyn's and Jørgen Henrich Rawert's plan for the rebuilding of the city.

The present building on the site was constructed in 1797-98 for clockmaker Johan Nicolaj Bath. Baht's property was home to a total of 30 residents at the 1801 census. The owner resided in one of the apartments with his third wife Christine Elisabeth Lund, his five children (aged five to 22), a clockmaker (employee) and an clockmaker's apprentice. Henning Stein, a silk and textile merchant, resided in another apartment with his wife Lowise Jacobsen, their two children (aged seven and nine), an apprentice and a maid. Johannes Christian Godske, a royal hairdresser, resided in the building with his wife Vibekke Høeg, his sister-in-law Ellen Maria Høeg and one maid. Anna Maria Thiil, a widow, resided in the building with two of her children (aged 27 and 28(, two lodgers and one maid. Jens Friderich Møller, a master tailor, resided in the building with his wife Johanne Christianna Wilde. their 22-year-old son Jens Christian Møller, the wife's 17-year-old niece Frideriche Lowise Leong and the 59-year-old lodger Erland Dahlberg (master tailor).

The property was in the new cadastre of 1806 listed as No. 45 and was still owned by Bath at that time.

=== 1840 census ===
The property was home to 20 residents in five households at the 1840 census. Johan Gotfred Bahl, a new clockmaker, resided on the ground floor with his wife Magrethe Bahl (née Andersen), their five-year-old son Johan Nicolay Bahl and one maid. Annette Tomine Christiane Fehmann, a widow, resided on the first floor with his daughter Dorthea Catrine Magrethe Faber and one maid. Elisa Catarine Hals, another widow, resided on the second floor with 27-year-old widow Laura Holst and one maid. Vilhelm Anders Syndergaard, a merchant (hørkræmmer), resided on the third floor with his wife Ingeborg Syndergaard fød Ellingsen, their four-year-old son and one maid. Johan Gotfred Andersen, a haulier, resided in the basement with his wife Ane Dorthea Andersen født Petersenm their one-year-old daughter, a coachman (employee) and one maid.

=== 1845 census ===
The property was home to 23 residents in five households at the 1845 census. Johann Gottfridt Baht was still occupying the ground floor of the building. He lived there with his wife, their youngest son (aged 10), a clockmaker and a maid. The basement was also still occupied by Johan Gotfred Andersen. He lived there with coachman Niels Peter Andersen and his wife Ane Dorthea Petersen, their two children (aged one and three) and one maid. Annette Christiane Fehner and Danthe Faber, two unmarried sisters (aged 57 and 68), resided together on the first floor with one miad. Frederik Boneventura Krüger, a treasurerwith title of justitsråd, resided on the second floor with his housekeeper Jacobine Louise Bojesen, widow of postmaster-general Rasmus Bruun Bojesen (1774-1840), resided on the third floor with her son Sophus Imanuel Anton Bojesen and one maid.

=== 1850 census ===
The property was home to 20 residents in five households at the 1850 census. Johan Gottfred Baht resided on the ground flor with his wife and 14-year-old son Johan Nicolai Baht. Niels Peter Andersen resided in the basement with his wife, three children and one maid. The Fehmar sisters were still residing on the first floor. Frederik Krüger was still residing on the second floor with one maid. Heinrich Carl Klein, a court bookseller currently employed by s A.Fr. Höst, resided on the third floor with his three children (aged four to 11), a housekeeper and a maid.

=== Later history ===
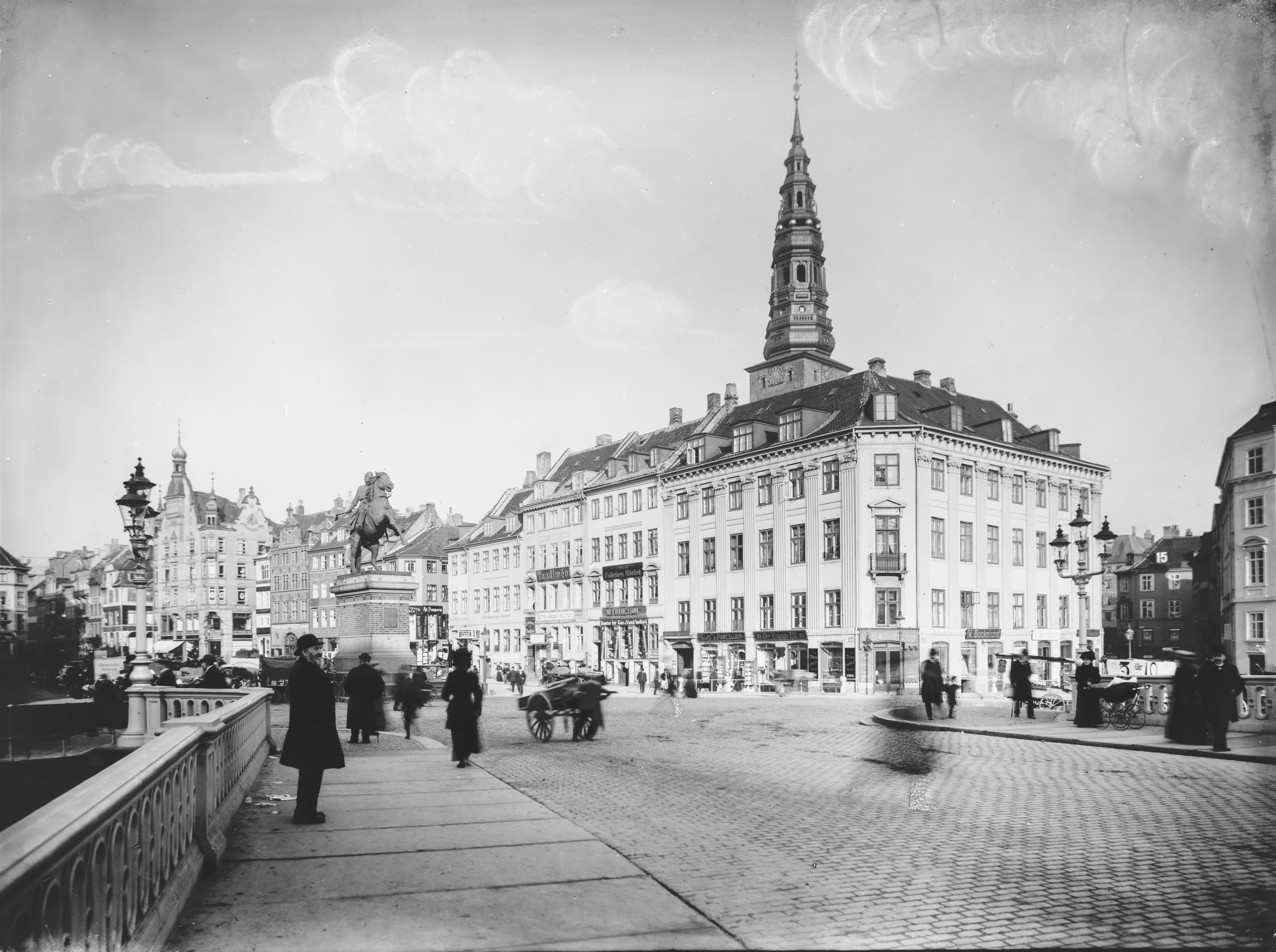
The building visible on a photograph by Johannes Hauerslev.

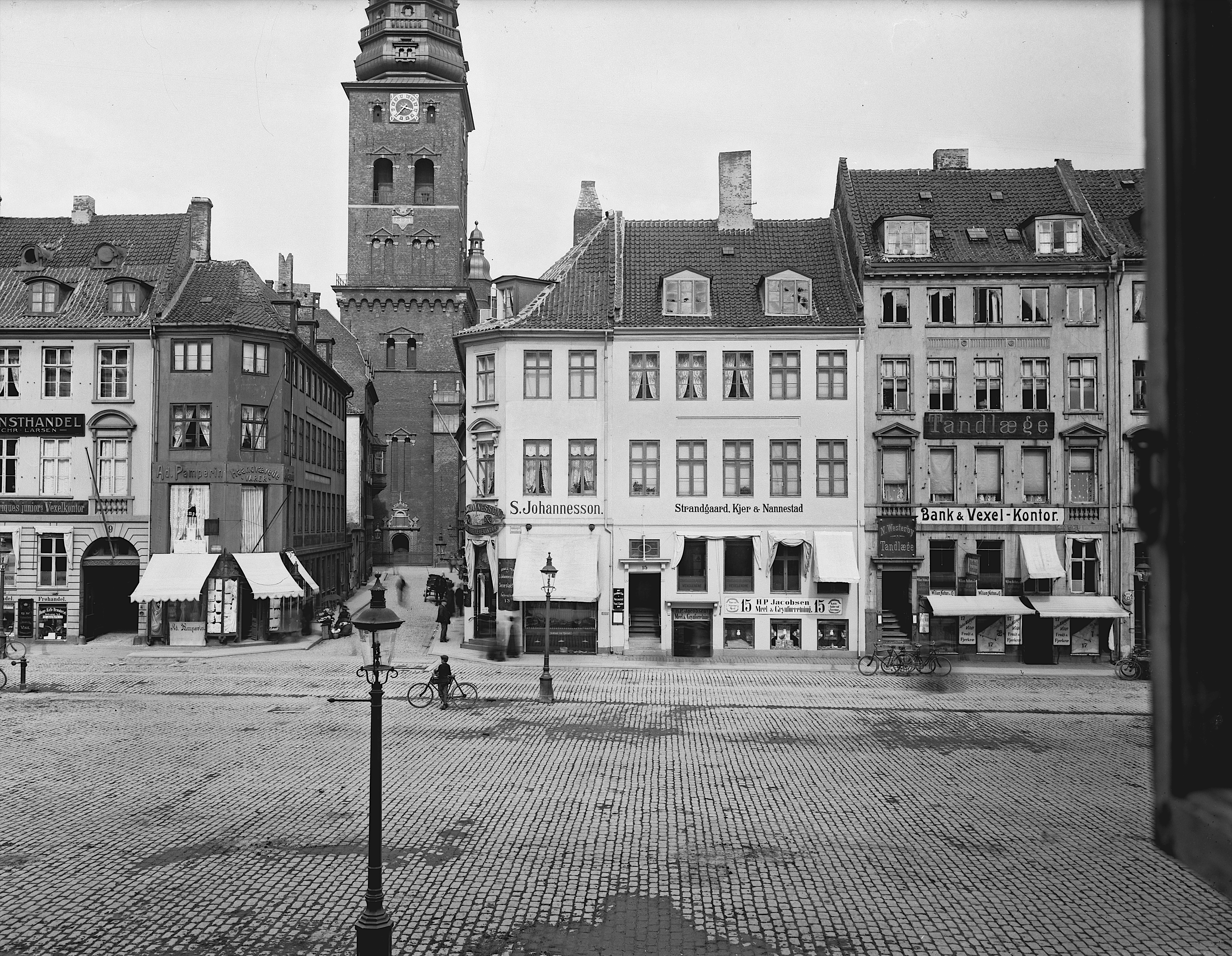
The building (furthest to the right)on 13 June 1911.

The industrialist and co-founder of Industribanken Hans Peter Frederiksen (1810-1891) was among the residents in 1861. With the introduction of house numbering by street in Copenhagen in 1859 (as opposed to the old cadastral numbers by quarter)), No. 45 became Højbro Plads 17.

The building was at the time of the 1880 census home to a total of 15 people.

The building was in the 1910s home to a broker's office as well as a dental clinic as advertized by large signs on the facade. (cf. the image)

== Architecture ==
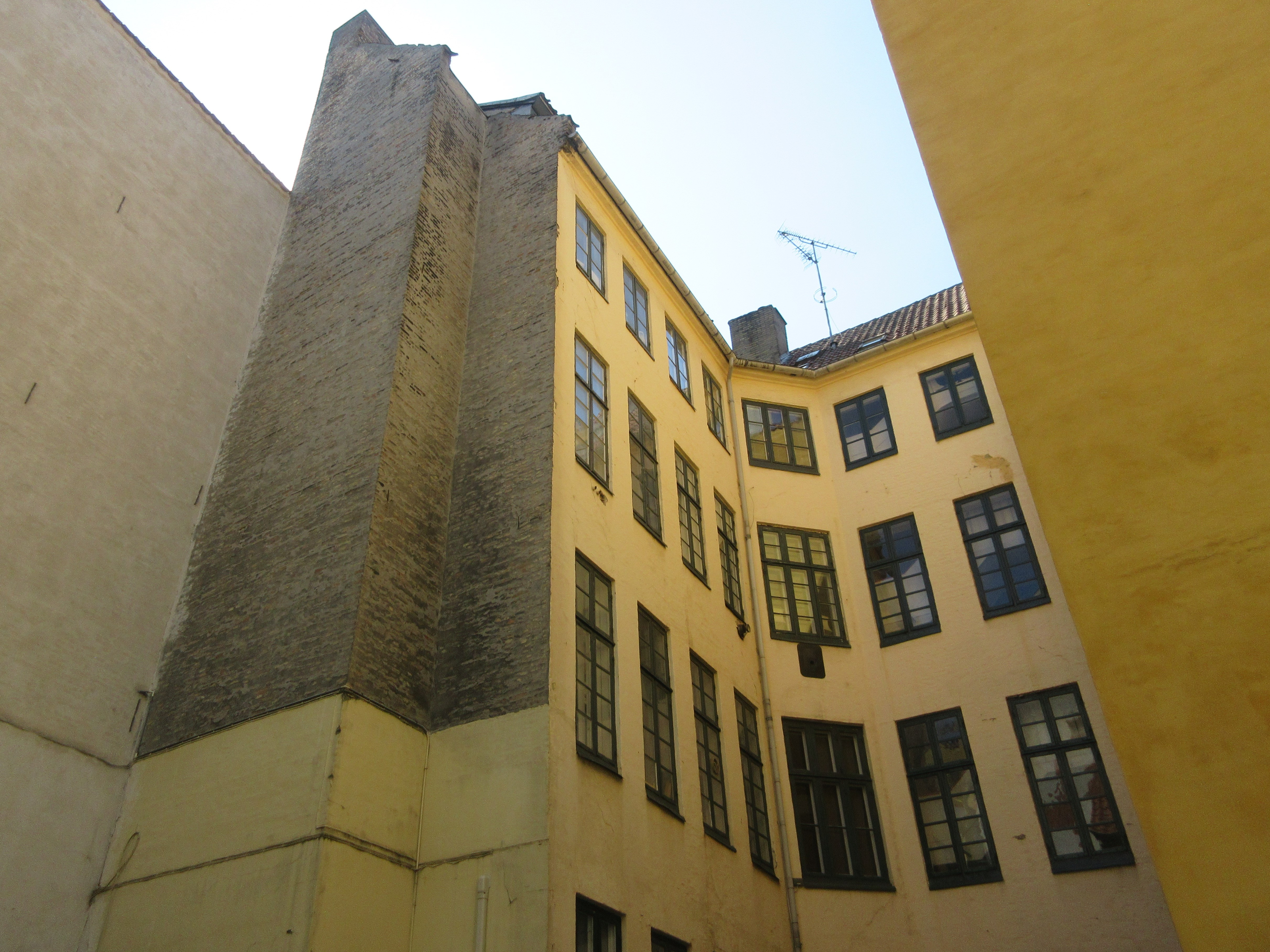
The building viewed from the yard.

The building is constructed with four storeys over a walk-out basement and is five bays wide. The facade is divided horizontally by a cornice band above the ground floor. The main entrance furthest to the left is topped by a hood mould supported by corbels. The basement entrance is located in the second bay from the right. The outer windows on the first floor are framed in sandstone and are topped by triangular pediments. The rectangular space below the windows were originally decorated with blind balustrades (cf. the vintage photo above). The outer windows on the second floor have sills supported by corbels but no pediments. The three central bays are visually brought together by through-going sills under the windows on the second and third floors while the sill on the first floor runs in the full width of the building. A slightly recessed band under the three central windows on the third floor was originally the site of a stucco frieze (cf. the vintage photo above). The facade is finished by a modillioned cornice under the roof. A short perpendicular side wing extends from the rear side of the building. The Building was listed in the Danish registry of protected buildings and places in 1824.

== Today ==
The building is today owned by E/F Højbro Plads 17.
