= Hans Just Group =

- Company type: Private limited company
- Industry: Wine and spirits
- Founded: 1868
- Founder: Hans Jacob Just
- Headquarters: Copenhagen, Denmark
- Key people: Peter and Thomas Karberg (CEOs), Per Heinze (chairman)
- Services: Wholesale
- Revenue: DKK 1.143 billion (2015)

The Hans Just Group is a distributor of wine and alcohol in the Nordic countries. The group consists of Hans Just A/S in Denmark, Nigab AB in Sweden, Robert Prizelius AS in Norway, Beverage Partners Finland OY in Finland and BJC Distribution Z O.O. in Poland.

== History ==
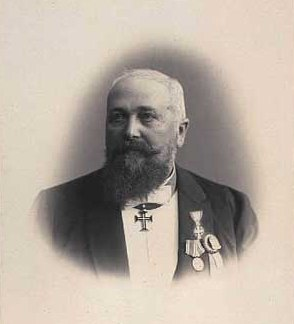
Hans Just

The company was founded by Hans Just on 17 June 1867, when he purchased a wine and spirits business on Store Kongensgade street, in Copenhagen, Denmark, from an old friend who wanted to emigrate to America.

In the 1870s, Just constructed a summer residence near the coast in Østerbro. In 1882, together with other investors, he established a distillery, Fortuna, on the neighbouring site. In 1885 they constructed a new road which connected the site to Østerbrogade. It was given the name Fortunavej (Fortuna Road( after the distillery and was later renamed Århusgade.

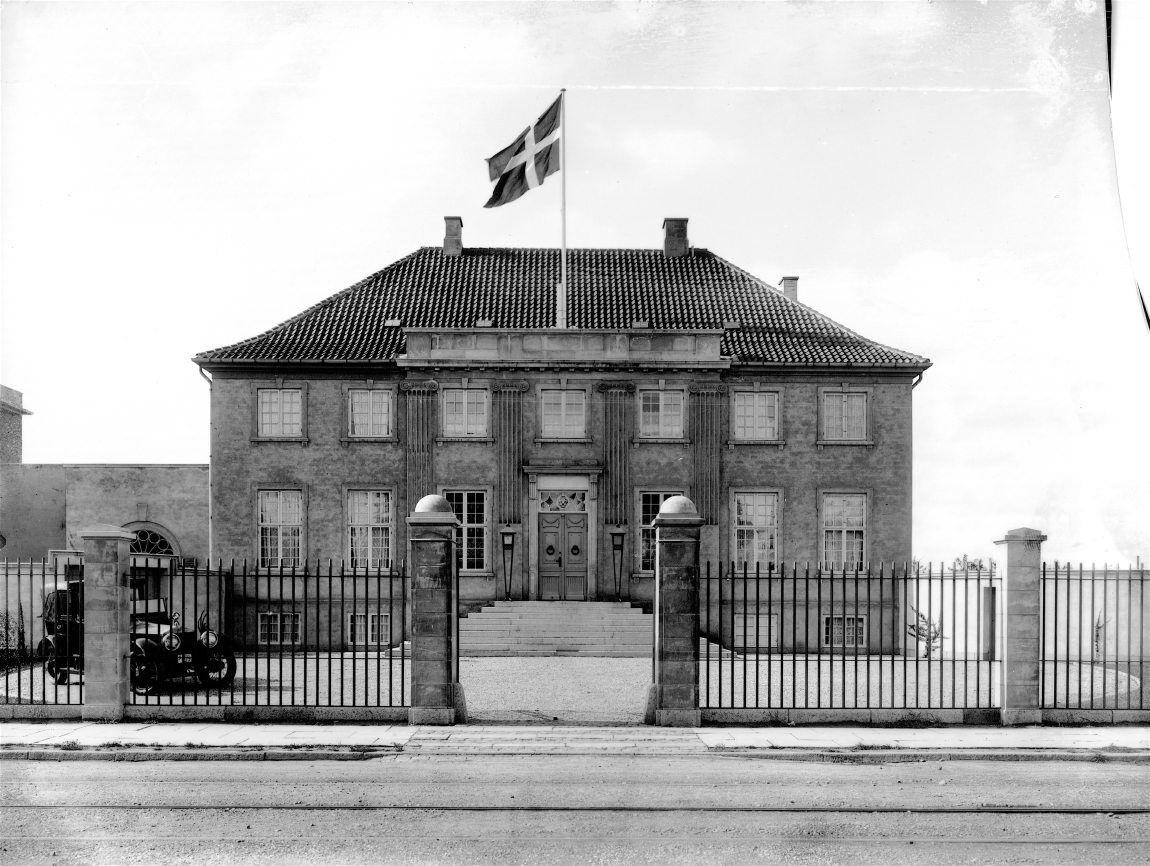
Poul Just's mansion at Øster Allé in Copenhagen

Hans Just's son Poul Just inherited the company after his father's death in 1912. He demolished the Østerbro buildings and constructed a large warehouse at the site in 1917. The site was conveniently located close to the Freeport of Copenhagen, and he expected Denmark to introduce an alcohol monopoly similar to the ones in Sweden and Norway. This did not happen, and much of the building was instead rented out. It was for a while used by Goodyear for storing car tires.

The company was later passed on to his son Henning Just (born 1905) and son-in-law Peter Christian Karberg (born 1909M married to Kirsten Ingeborg Just). Their son, Flemming Just Karberg, joined the family business at the age of 22 in 1959. He became co-owner in 1965 and its sole owner in 1979. His sons Peter, Thomas and Andreas each received 10 % of the shares in the 1980s.

In 2017, Hans Just Group sold its share of Det Danske Spiritus Kompagni A/S to the Norwegian company Arcus Gruppen.

== Companies ==
- Hans Just A/S, Denmark
- Nigab AB, Sweden
- Robert Prizelius AS, Norway
- Beverage Partners Finland OY, Finland
- BJC Distribution Z O.O., Poland
