= Århusgade =

Street in Copenhagen, Denmark

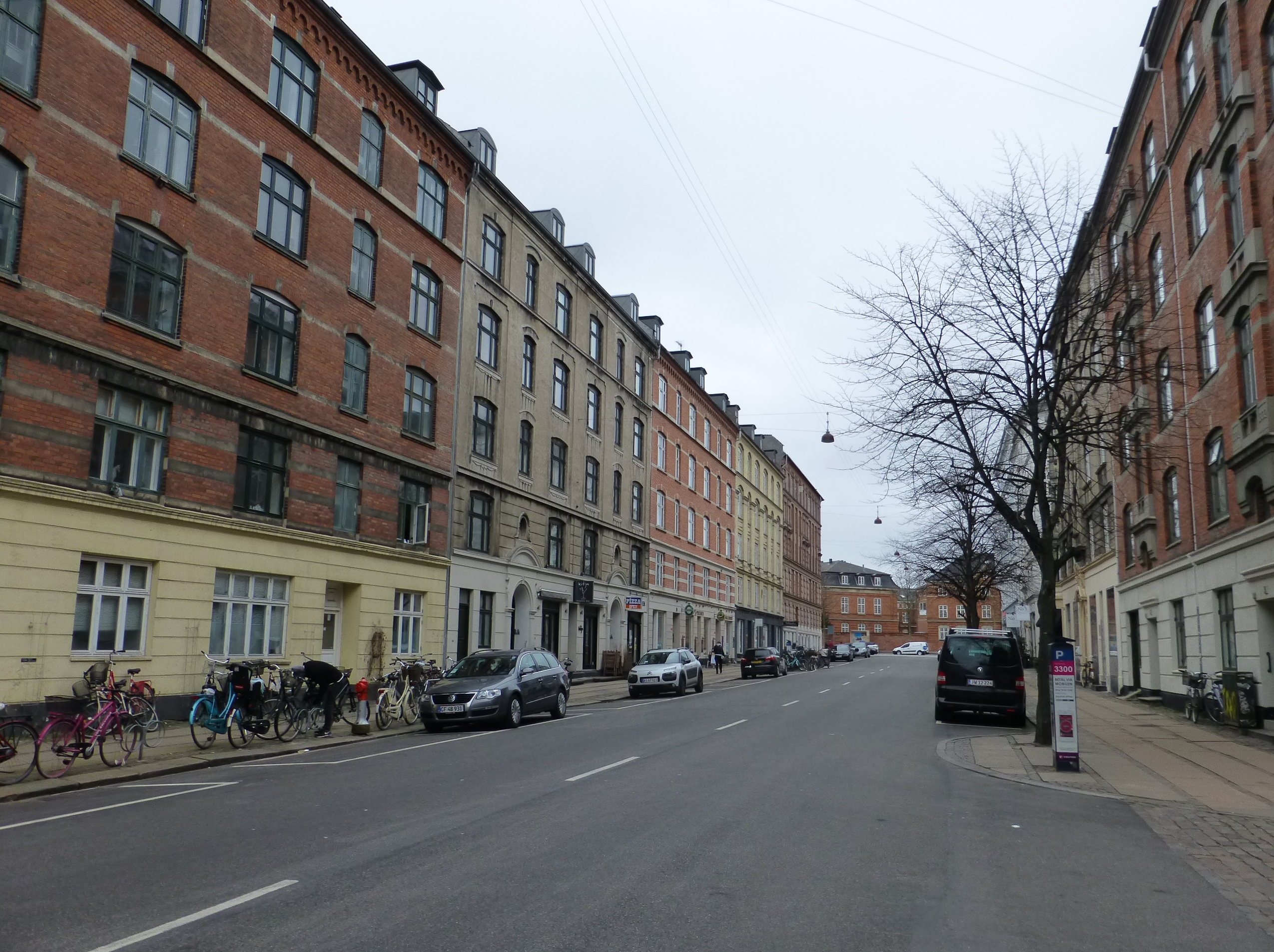
- Århusgade
- Length: 1,250 m (4,100 ft)
- Location: Copenhagen, Denmark
- Postal code: 2100
- Coordinates: 55°42′23.76″N 12°35′6″E

Århusgade is a street in the Østerbro district of Copenhagen, Denmark. It extends east from Østerbrogade and passes under the railway just before entering the southernmost part of Nordhavn which is known as the Århusgade neighbourhood (Danish Århusgadekvarteret) after it. The street has many cafés and small shops. The street is named after the City of Aarhus, the second largest city in Denmark.

== History ==
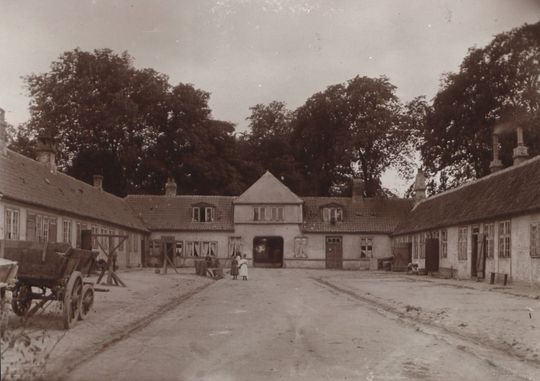
Ny Kalkbrænderi

Århusgade crosses an area which was known as Slagtervangen until the second half of the 19th century. The area was owned by the City of Copenhagen but leased to the Butchers' Guild who used it for grazing. The street also passes the site where Ny Kalkbrænderi ("The New Lime Plant") was built in 1777. It occupied the triangular site between present day Løgstørgade )then Kalkbrænderivej, "Lime Plant Road"(, Strandboulevarden and Århusgade.

In the 1870s, the wine merchant Hans Just built a summer residence near the coast. In 1882, together with other investors, he established a distillery, Fortuna, on the neighbouring site. The oldest section of Århusgade, then named Fortunavej ("Fortuna Road"), was created in 1885 when they wanted a more direct link between their factory and Østerbrogade.

The name Århusgade was introduced in 1886 when a large number of streets in the area were named after larger Danish towns. The man behind the naming scheme was Thorkild Krak. The street was built over with apartments for the many workers at enterprises such as the Øresund cryolite factory and Copenhagen's new Freeport which opened in 1894.

== Notable buildings and residents ==
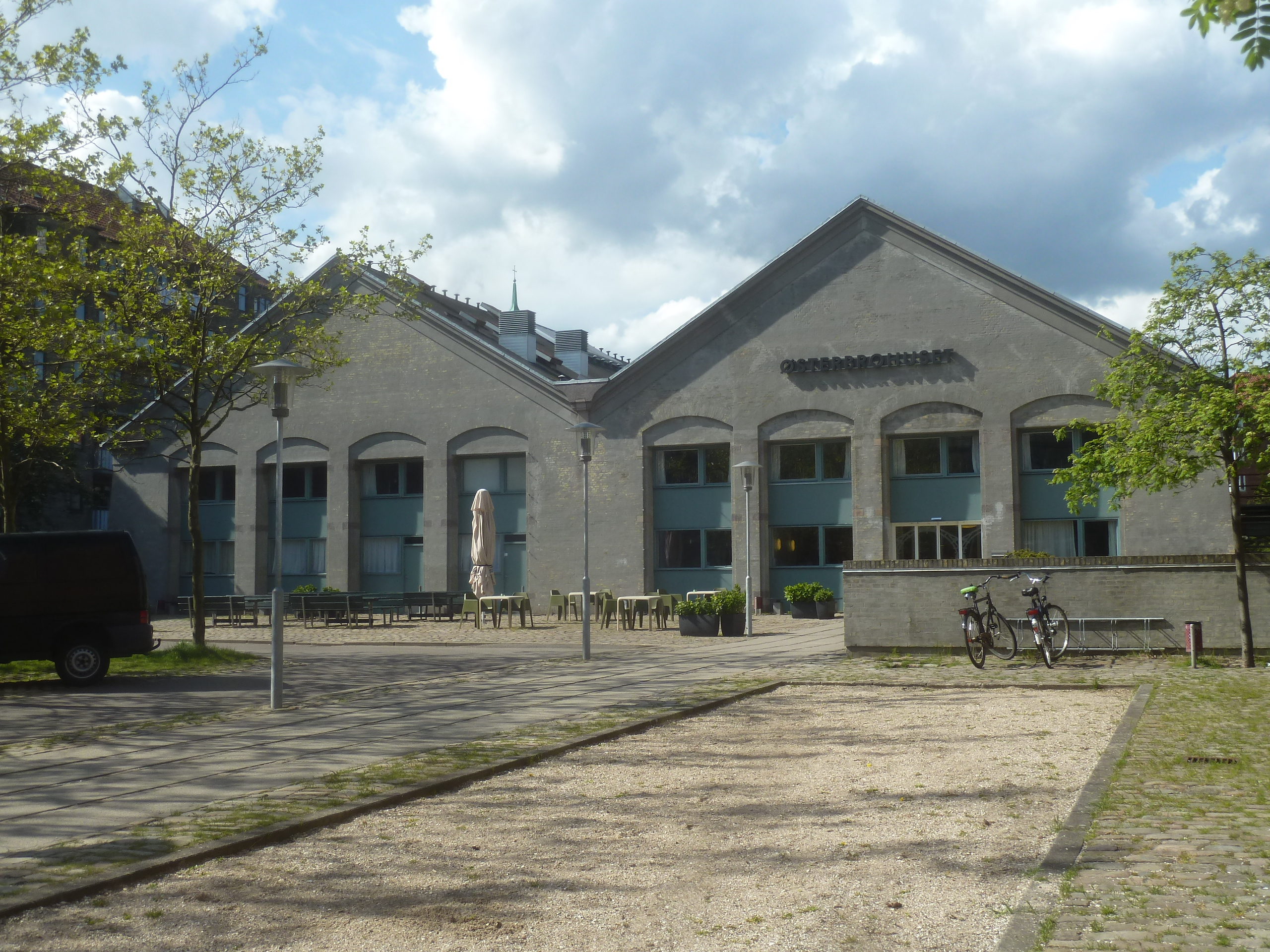
No. 101: The former tramway depot, nor Østerbrohuset

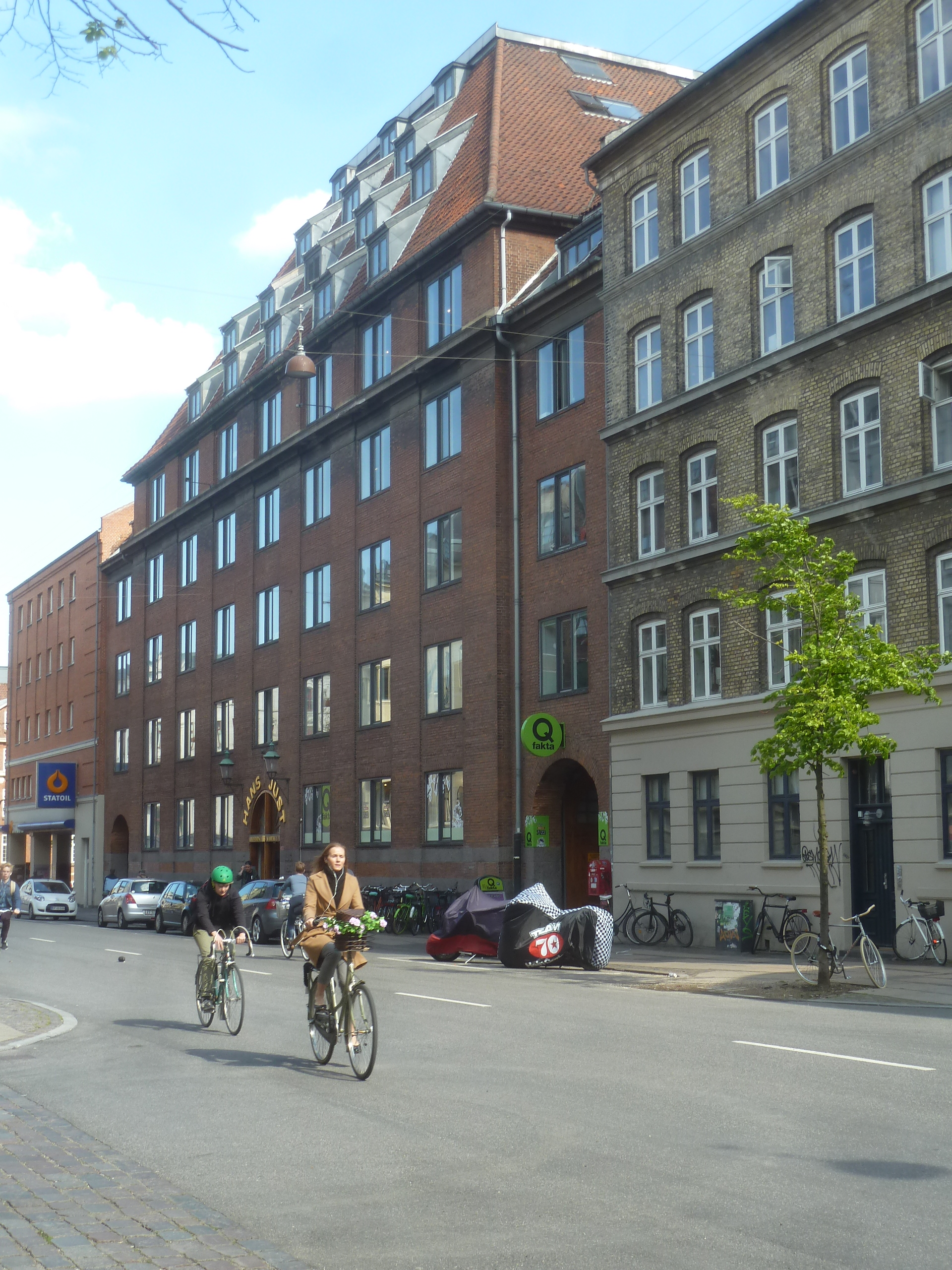
The Hans Just Warehouse at No. 88

Østerbrohuset (No. 101) is a community centre with sport facilities, mainly used for badminton and basketball, a small café and facilities for local associations. The building is a former tramway depot, Århusgade Remise, built in 1901 to design by Vilhelm Friederichsen for De Kjøbenhavnske Sporveje ("Copenhagen Tramways"). The building is now used as a community centre with sport facilities, mainly used for badminton and basketball, a small café and facilities for local associations.

The Hans Just Warehouse (Hans Just Pakhus) was built in 1917 by Hans Just's son Poul Just. With its nine floors, it was the building in Denmark with most floors at the time of its completion. The building is still owned by the family and serves as headquarters of Hans Just A/S as well as their property company Karberghus.

== Århusgadekvarteret redevelopment ==
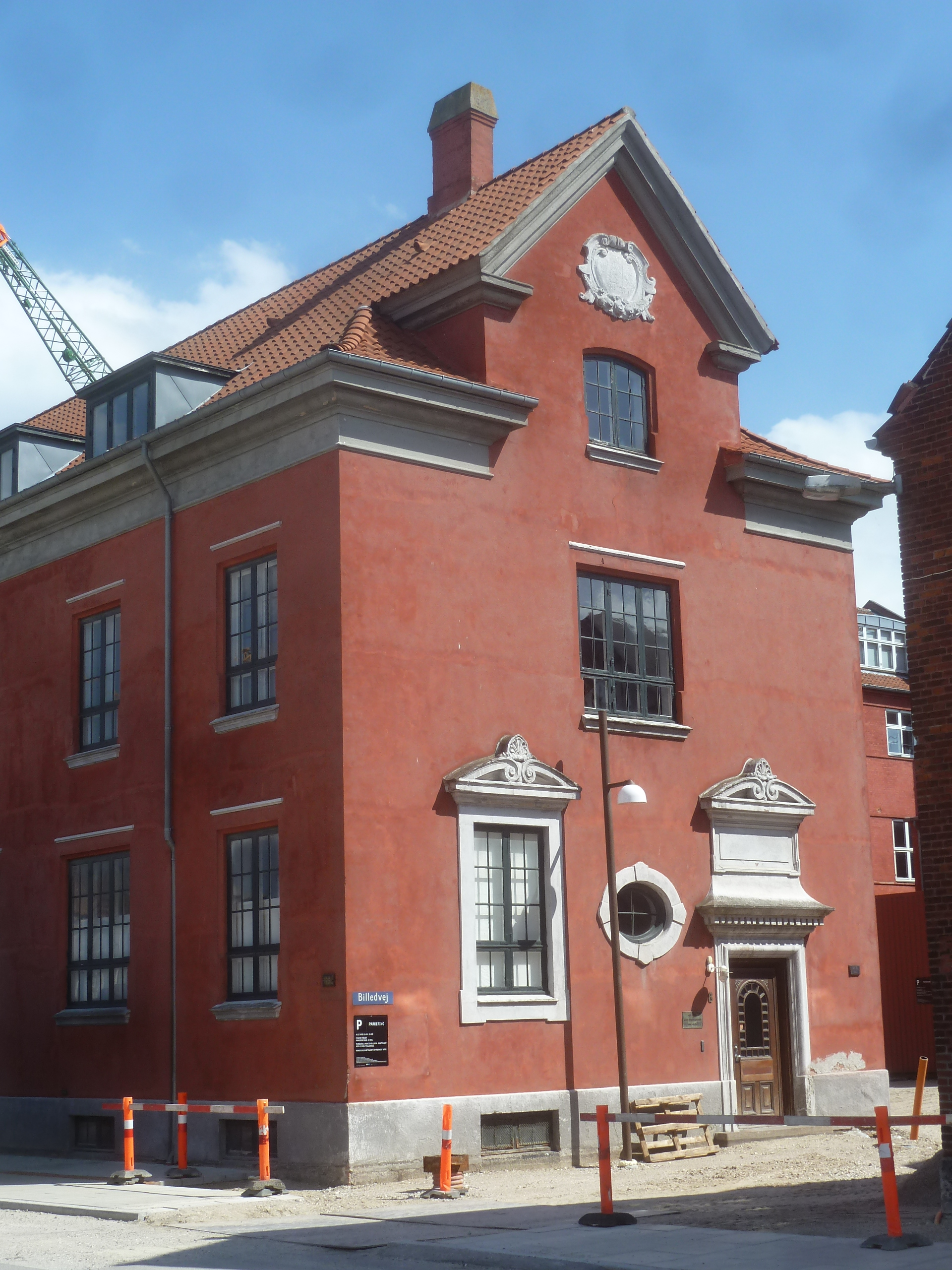
The former headquarters of Russian Danish Trading Company

The Århusgade neighbourhood is the first phase of the redevelopment of Copenhagen's northern docklands. The area is covered by two local plans. A local plan for the eastern part of the Århusgade neighbourhood was adopted in 2011. Another local plan covers the area closest the rail line.

The area will be home to 2,400 residents and 1,700 jobs. The area will consist of a mixture of new and old buildings. The first residents moved into their new apartments in Havnehuset in April 2015. Historic buildings include the former headquarters of Russisk Dansk Handelskompagni ("Russian Danish Trading Company") from 1918. The red, Neo-Baroque building was later taken over by Riffelsyndikatet and is now part of a larger, five-winged complex on the corner with Billedgade.

Århusgade will be the main shopping street of the neighbourhood. Its retail and restaurant premises will be developed in a 60/40 partnership between Nordic Real Estate Partners and By & Havn.

== Transport ==
Nordhavn station is located just south of the intersection with Kalkbrænderihavnsvej. It is served by the A, B, E, G and H trains of the S-train network. The Nordhavn Line of the Copenhagen Metro will have a station in the Århusgade neighbourhood. The western end of the street is located 700 metres to the north of the future City Circle Line station at Trianglen.
