= Harald Valdemar Mansfeld-Büllner =

Danish businessman and numismatist

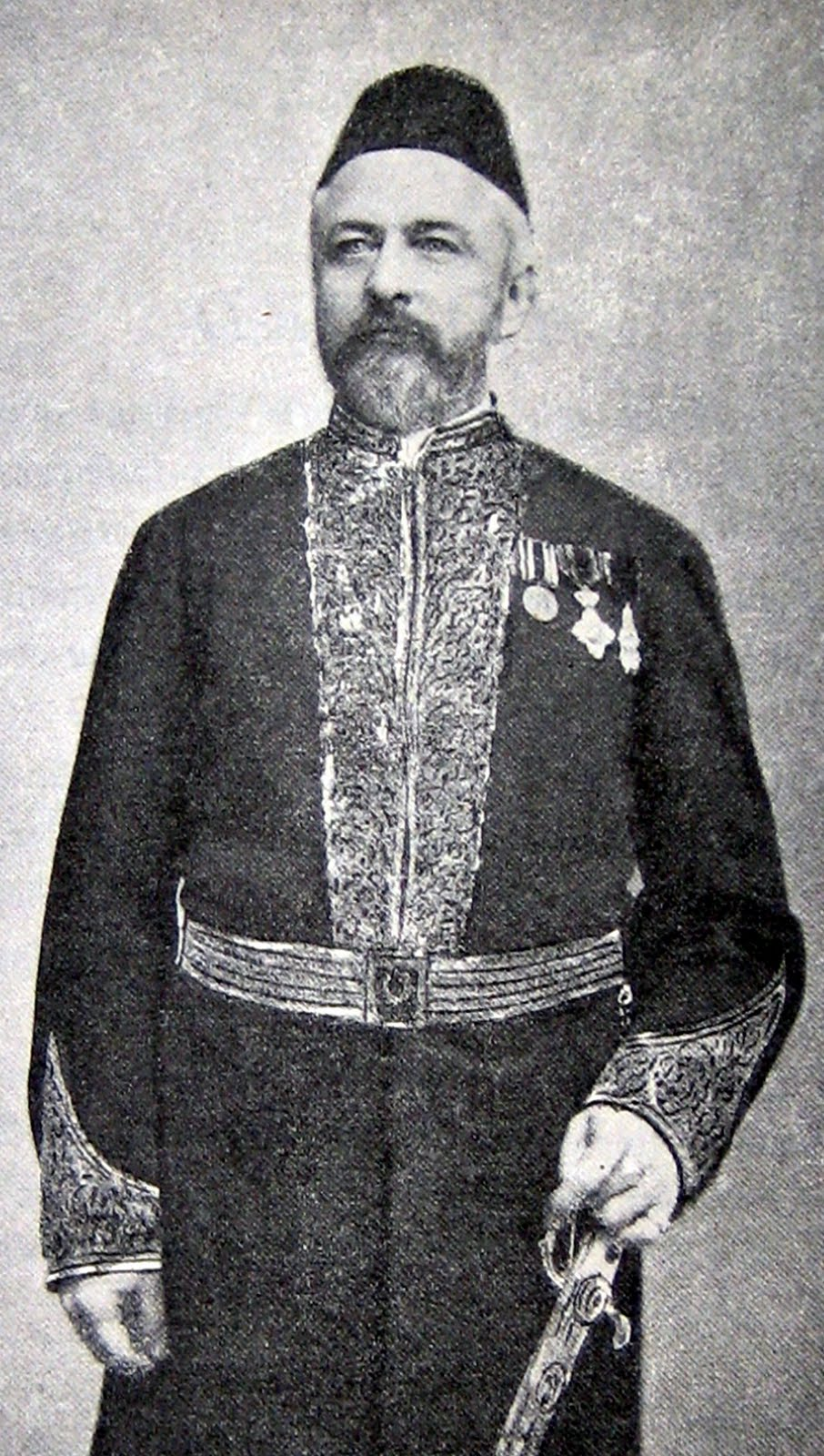
- Mansfeld-Büllner, who served as Osmanic consul-general from 1781, in Osmanic garments
- Born: 29 September 1842; Copenhagen, Denmark
- Died: 22 May 1900 (aged 57); Wiesbaden, Germany
- Occupation: Businessman

Harald Valdemar Mansfeld-Büllner (29 September 1842 – 22 May 1900) was a Danish businessman and numismatic collector. He co-founded the company Mansfeld-Bullner & Lassen which was particularly known for its Brama Life Elixir.

== Early life and education ==
Mansfeld-Büllner was after his confirmation sent to Nakskov where he apprenticed as a merchant. He then worked for a while in Nykøbing Falster before serving as a volunteer in the Second Schleswig War where he reached the rank of lieutenant.

== Career ==
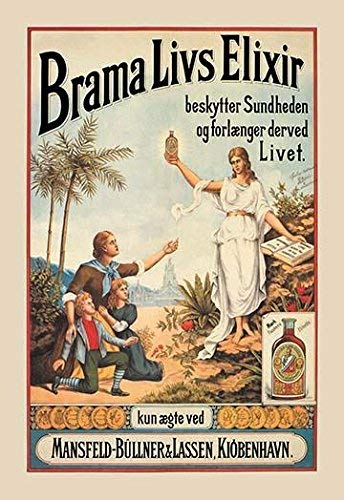
Brahma Livs Elixir advertising poster, 1893

After the war, he returned to Copenhagen where he founded Mansfeld-Büllner & Lassen in a partnership with a childhood friend who had become a photographer. The company traded in chemical compounds, perfumes and a bitter named "Brahma-Livs-Elixir". The latter was from 1761 produced by Mansfeld-Büllner on factories in both Copenhagen and Malmö. The head office was located on Frederiksberggade.

Mansfeld-Büllner launched an advertisement campaign for "Brahma-Livs-Elixir" which was a huge success. The product became so known that it was parodized in the revue Nytaarsnat 1872-73 at the Casino Theatre in Amaliegade and later that same year again in the comic operetta Malabarenken.

== Numismatic collector ==
Mansfeld-Büllner was the owner of an extensive coin collection. He published Afbildninger af samtlige hidtil kjendte Mønter fra Tidsrummet 1241-1377, 1887 in 1887. The illustrations have later been republished by J. Chr. Holm in 1954. His coin collection was after his death purchased by Isak Glückstadt.

== Personal life ==
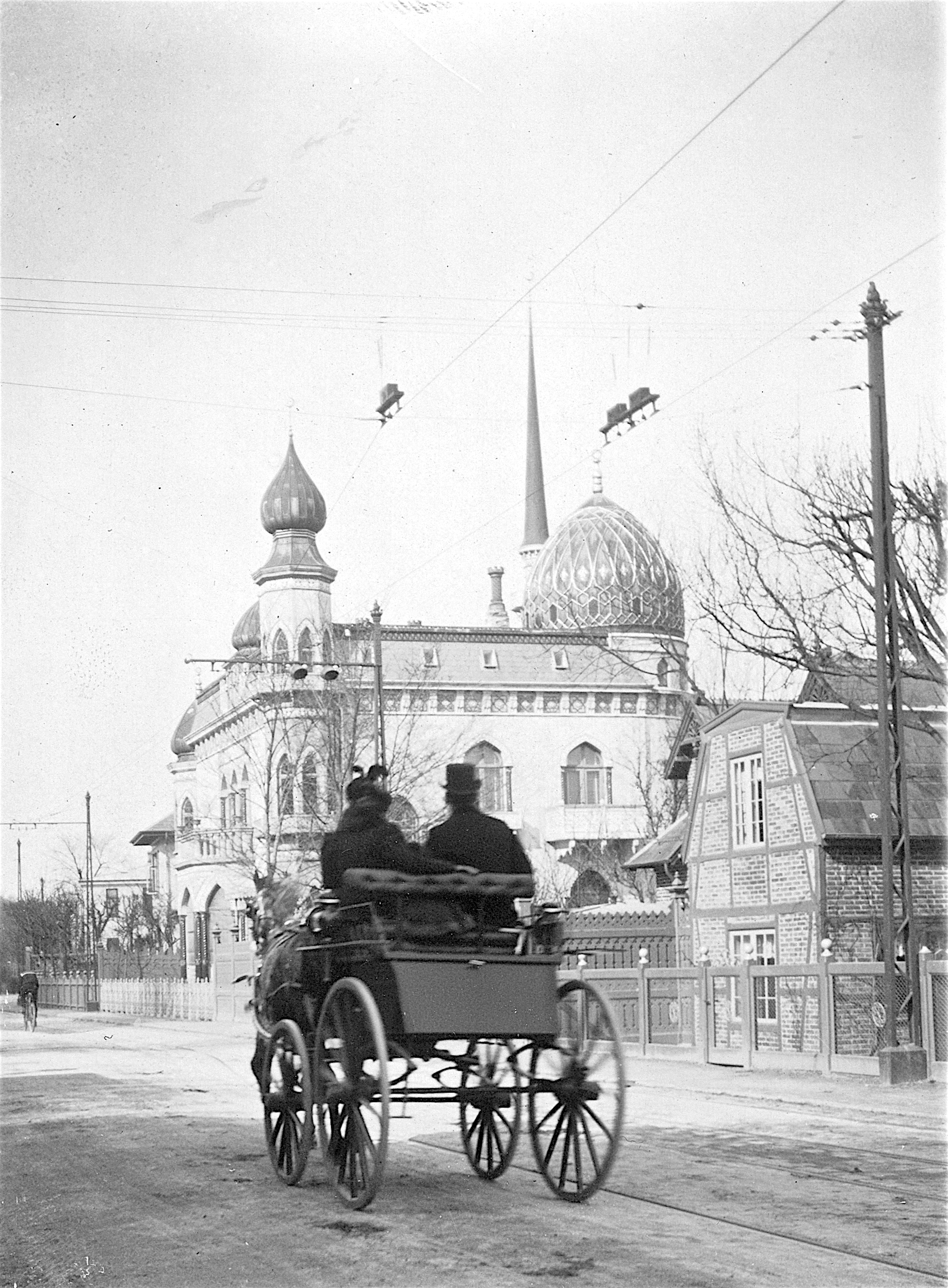
Villa Hasa

Mansfeld-Büllner married Andrea Johanne Alvilda Rieneck (4 March 1849 – 30 April 1922), a daughter of master tailor Georg Wilhelm Rieneckm on 4 August 1870.

He served as Osmanic consul-general in Copenhagen from 1891. He lived at Bredgade 49 in Copenhagen before building the Osmanic Revival style Villa Hasa on Strandvejen in Skovshoved in 1898. The building was designed by A. O. Leffland.

On the way to Constantinopel, in 1900, he suddenly fell ill in Wiesbaden and died on 22 May. He is buried in St. Peter's Church in Copenhagen.

Villa Hasa was demolished in 1938 to make way for an extension of Hvidørevej in connection with the construction of the new Kystvejen (Coast Road).
